= Qais Ashfaq =

British boxer (born 1993)

Personal information
- Nationality: British
- Born: 10 March 1993 (age 33) Leeds, England
- Height: 1.70 m (5 ft 7 in)
- Weight: Super bantamweight; Featherweight; Super featherweight

Boxing career
- Stance: Southpaw

Boxing record
- Total fights: 18
- Wins: 13
- Win by KO: 5
- Losses: 4
- Draws: 1
Medal record
Men's amateur boxing
Representing Great Britain
European Championships
Silver medal – second place	2015 Samokov	Bantamweight
European Games
Bronze medal – third place	2015 Baku	Bantamweight
Representing England
Commonwealth Games
Silver medal – second place	2014 Glasgow	Bantamweight
Commonwealth Youth Games
Gold medal – first place	2011 Isle of Man	Bantamweight

Qais Ashfaq (born 10 March 1993) is a British professional boxer. As an amateur, Ashfaq competed at the 2016 Summer Olympics as well as winning a silver medal at the 2014 Commonwealth Games.

== Early life and education ==
Ashfaq was born in Leeds. He attended Prince's Henry's Grammar School. He studied sports performance at Leeds Beckett University.

== Amateur career ==
He won the 2012 and 2014 Amateur Boxing Association British featherweight title, when boxing out of the Meanwood ABC and Burmantofts ABC, respectively. He was a gold medalist at the 2011 Commonwealth Youth Games.

=== Olympic result ===
Rio 2016

- Round of 32: Defeated by Chatchai-decha Butdee (Thailand) 3–0

=== European Games result ===
Baku 2015

- Round of 32: Defeated Georgi Gogatishvili (Georgia) 3–0
- Round of 16: Defeated Selçuk Eker (Turkey) 2–1
- Quarter-finals: Defeated Omar El-Hag (Germany) 3–0
- Semi-finals: Defeated by Dzmitry Asanau (Belarus) 3–0

=== Commonwealth Games result ===
Glasgow 2014

- Round of 16: Defeated Neo Thamahane (Lesotho) 3–0
- Quarter-finals: Defeated Joe Ham (Scotland) 3–0
- Semi-finals: Defeated Benson Gicharu (Kenya) 3–0
- Final: Defeated by Michael Conlan (Northern Ireland) 3–0

== Professional career ==
=== Super bantamweight ===
==== Early career ====
He turned professional in July 2017, signing with Hayemaker Ringstar. He will be trained under Ismael Salas alongside Jorge Linares, David Haye, Joe Joyce, and Willy Hutchinson. On 1 February 2018, Ashfaq signed with Eddie Hearn and Matchroom Sport. Ashfaq finally made his professional debut with Jamie Moore and Nigel Travis in his corner on 25 February at the Victoria Warehouse in Manchester against British boxer Brett Fidoe. Prior to the fight, Fidoe had a record of 8 wins and 44 losses, with only one stoppage loss against Andrew Selby in 2016. Ashfaq dominated the four round bout winning on points. Referee Mark Lyson scored the fight 40–36 for Ashfaq. Ashfaq had his second bout on the Amir Khan vs. Phil Lo Greco card on 21 April at the Echo Arena in Liverpool. After four rounds, Ashfaq defeated Ricky Starkey via a points decision. Referee Michael Alexander scored the bout for Ashfaq. Ashfaq returned on another Amir Khan undercard, this time at the Arena Birmingham on 8 September 2018. He knocked out Gary Austin in the first round. Ashfaq finished the year fighting at the FlyDSA Arena in Sheffield on 8 December against Jay Carney. Ashfaq stopped Carney in round five, recording his second stoppage win.

Ashfaq started 2019 on a JD NXTGEN card at the East of England Arena in Peterborough on 2 March. Ashfaq won a 6-round decision against Fadhili Majiha with the referee scoring the bout 60–54. His next fight also came on a JD NXTGEN card on 2 August at Exhibition Centre Liverpool. The fight was against Sean Davis. Ashfaq improved his record with points in after 8 rounds. The referee scored the bout 79–73. Ashfaq was set for his first title fight on 2 November against Joe Ham at Manchester Arena. The belt up for grabs was the vacant WBA Continental title. The boxers had previously met in the amateur ranks during the Glasgow 2014 Commonwealth Games quarter-finals, which saw Ashfaq advance to the next round. The fight was scheduled for 10 rounds. Ashfaq dropped Ham in round 3. A cut opened above Ham's left eye and the fight was stopped after seven rounds, heading to the scorecards, due to the accidental cut. The three judges scored it 69–64, 70–64 and 70-63 cards, for Ashfaq awarding him his first title in the professional ranks.

==== Ashfaq vs. Leach ====
Due to COVID restrictions, Ashfaq spent the majority of 2020 on the sidelines. A fight was eventually made against friend and former sparring partner Marc Leach on 17 October at the East of England Arena in Peterborough. Ashfaq began training with Angel Fernandez prior to the fight. The link up started with a chat through social media. Speaking on the fight, Ashfaq said, "When me and Marc get in the ring we won’t be friends but we will be shaking hands before and after. Once that bell rings, we’re enemies. I’ve been taking fights that were offered but it’s about time I get an opportunity like this. After I get this win I’m looking to push on towards that British Title." He also signed a deal with 258 Management. The winner would be in line to challenge British champion Brad Foster. In an upset, Ashfaq was dropped twice and lost a unanimous decision to Leach, suffering his first career defeat in the process. Ashfaq was not able to find his pace in the fight as Leach started off quick, roughing him him. The first knockdown occurred in the 4th round following a hard left hand after making Ashfaq miss. Although Ashfaq gave a good account for himself getting back into the fight. This was until the closing seconds of round 7, when he allowed himself to be countered by a left hand, dropping him again. Despite the knockdowns, the fight was close and the scorecards reflected this. The three judges scored the fight 96–92, 96–93 and 95–93 for Leach.

=== Super featherweight ===
Following his first defeat, Ashfaq had a quick turnaround, next fight on 12 December 2020 on the Joshua vs. Pulev undercard. He fought Ashley Lane (14–9–2, 1 KO) in an 8-round contest at The SSE Arena in London. Ashfaq won the fight via 4th round TKO. Lane was dropped in the first and third rounds. Ashfaq did not take a fight in 2021 and next returned to the ring on 30 July 2022, stopping Romanian boxer Alexandru Ionita in the 6th and final round. He then won a six-round bout via points against Yader Cardoza on 13 November in Wolverhampton before returning less than two weeks later defeating Alexander Taylor on the 25 November in Leeds.

On 24 May 2023, Wasserman Boxing announced the vacant British super featherweight title would be contested between Ashfaq and Liam Dillon (12–0–1, 3 KOs) on 24 June at the Vertu Motors Arena in Newcastle. The card was headlined by local Josh Kelly and streamed exclusively on DAZN. Dillon was coming off a win against Joshua Wahab, considered a career-best. Ashfaq stated he still inspired to be world champion and felt this was a reboot in his career. He said, “Liam is a very tough kid and while he may not have my technical ability, he will be in my face for the whole fight. But he can’t out-box me and this can be a very straight-forward fight for me, but it is also for me to lose ... Winning the British title will lead to many more big nights, and I genuinely believe I will still become a world champion.” Dillon had previously held the Southern Area and English titles. Ashfaq was upset again losing a split decision to Dillon. Ashfaq was dropped twice during the bout, once in the fourth and again in the ninth, however these were not heavy knockdowns. Ron Kearney scored the bout for 115–112 for Ashfaq, but was overturned by Michael Alexander who had it 115–112 for Dillon and Terry O’Connor scored a wider 117–111 for Dillon. After the fight Dillon dedicated the win to his sister, who had died a few month before.

=== Featherweight ===
On 7 January 2024, it was announced by Queensberry Promotions, Ashfaq would challenge recently crowned Masood Abdulah (9–0, 6 KOs) for his Commonwealth silver featherweight title. Abdulah defeated Ashfaq's previous foe Marc Leach to win the belt. Abdulah praised Ashfaq ahead of their fight, “He’s a very good opponent. Super experienced, had a vast number of amateur fights and went on to world level. It should be a good fight for me.” He went on to say he expected to move on to bigger fights after this. The fight took place on 10 February at the Copper Box Arena in London. Ashfaq was stopped in round 5, suffering his 3rd career defeat. Abdulah was the aggressor from the opening bell and Ashfaq settled into his role on the backfoot. Abdulah was warned by the referee for pushing Ashfaq over a number of times. Ashfaq landed a fight hook in round 3 which gained Abdulah's attention. In round 4 Ashfaq was dropped following a combination, however a knockdown was not given. The end came when Abdulah landed a combination of punches to Ashfaq, finished off with an uppercut. Ashfaq beat the count, but was dropped a further two times, before his corner threw in the towel. The official time of stoppage was 2:02 of the round.

Ashfaq returned to the ring on 8 June at the Oldham Leisure Centre outpointing Jayro Fernando Duran 60–54 on the referee's scorecard. He then fought to a draw against Levi Giles in a Commonwealth title eliminator on 7 December 2024 at the Park Community Arena in Sheffield. After 10 rounds, referee Steve Gray scored the bout 95–95. The fight was action packed and received praises from promoters involved and the commentary team which included Adam Smith, Sunny Edwards, and Dave Caldwell, all believed Ashfaq had done enough to win.

Ashfaq's next fight was announced in June 2025 to take place on the undercard of the Moses Itauma vs. Dillian Whyte Riyadh Season card in Riyadh, Saudi Arabia on 16 August. His opponent was Japanese super featherweight Hayato Tsutumi (7–0, 4 KOs). Only in the early stages of his professional career, Tsutsaumi recently stopped boxer René Alvarado in 2024. Both weighed in at 131.9 pounds. Tsutsumi achieved a decisive victory over Ashfaq, executing four knockdowns during the bout. In the third round, Tsutsumi delivered three of these knockdowns, including a sequence initiated by a three-punch combination culminating in a right cross, a left hook that connected while Ashfaq was positioned against the ropes, and a final barrage of punches that compelled referee Leszek Jankowiak to terminate the contest.

== Professional boxing record ==
18 fights	13 wins	4 losses
By knockout	5	2
By decision	8	2
Draws	1	

No.	Result	Record	Opponent	Type	Round, time	Date	Location	Notes
18	Loss	13–4–1	Hayato Tsutsumi	TKO	3 (10), 2:07	16 Aug 2025	anb Arena, Riyadh, Saudi Arabia	
17	Draw	13–3–1	Levi Giles	PTS	10	7 Dec 2024	Park Community Arena, Sheffield, England	
16	Win	13–3	Jayro Fernando Duran	PTS	6	8 June 2024	Oldham Leisure Centre, Oldham, England	
15	Loss	12–3	Masood Abdulah	TKO	5 (10), 2:02	10 Feb 2024	Copper Box Arena, London, England	
14	Loss	12–2	Liam Dillon	SD	12	15 Jul 2023	Vertu Motors Arena, Newcastle, England	For vacant British super featherweight title
13	Win	12–1	Alexander Taylor	PTS	6	25 Nov 2022	Leeds United FC Banqueting Suite, Elland Road, Leeds, England	
12	Win	11–1	Yader Cardoza	PTS	6	13 Nov 2022	The Hangar Events Venue, Wolverhampton, England	
11	Win	10–1	Alexandru Ionita	KO	6 (6), 2:24	30 Jul 2022	The Eastside Rooms, Birmingham, England	
10	Win	9–1	Ashley Lane	TKO	4 (8), 0:20	12 Dec 2020	The SSE Arena, London, England	
9	Loss	8–1	Marc Leach	UD	10	17 Oct 2020	East of England Arena, Peterborough, England	
8	Win	8–0	Joe Ham	TD	7 (10), 0:01	2 Nov 2019	Manchester Arena, Manchester, England	Won vacant WBA Continental super bantamweight title; Unanimous TD after Ham cut from accidental head clash
7	Win	7–0	Sean Davis	PTS	8	2 Aug 2019	Exhibition Centre, Liverpool, England	
6	Win	6–0	Stefan Sashev	KO	1 (6), 2:25	4 May 2019	Victoria Warehouse, Manchester, England	
5	Win	5–0	Fadhili Majiha	PTS	6	2 Mar 2019	East of England Arena, Peterborough, England	
4	Win	4–0	Jay Carney	TKO	5 (6), 0:45	8 Dec 2018	FlyDSA Arena, Sheffield, England	
3	Win	3–0	Gary Austin	KO	1 (6), 2:06	8 Sep 2018	Arena Birmingham, Birmingham, England	
2	Win	2–0	Ricky Starkey	PTS	4	21 Apr 2018	Echo Arena, Liverpool, England	
1	Win	1–0	Brett Fidoe	PTS	4	25 Feb 2018	Victoria Warehouse, Manchester, England	
