= List of southpaw stance boxers =

This is a list of southpaw stance boxers. Southpaw is a boxing term that designates the stance where the boxer has his right hand and right foot forward, leading with right jabs, and following with a left cross right hook. Southpaw is the normal stance for a left-handed boxer. The corresponding designation for a right-handed boxer is orthodox, and is generally a mirror-image of the southpaw stance.

Name	Year of birth	Year of death	Country of birth	Weight class	References
William Abelyan	1978		Armenia	featherweight	
Ilyas Abbadi	1992		Algeria	welterweight, middleweight	
Khariton Agrba	1995		Russia	light welterweight, welterweight	
Murodjon Akhmadaliev	1994		Uzbekistan	super bantamweight	
Aarón Alameda	1993		Mexico	super bantamweight	
Wilson Alcorro	1974		Colombia	light welterweight, lightweight, super featherweight, featherweight	
Mourad Aliev	1995		Russia	super heavyweight	
Lennox Allen	1985		Guyana	super middleweight	
Mikhail Aloyan	1988		Russia	super flyweight, bantamweight	
Czar Amonsot	1985		Philippines	light welterweight, lightweight, super featherweight, featherweight	
Demetrius Andrade	1988		United States	light middleweight, middleweight, super middleweight	
Dave Apolinario	1999		Philippines	flyweight	
Chad Aquino	1982		United States	welterweight	
Nihito Arakawa	1981		Japan	lightweight	
Christian Araneta	1995		Philippines	light flyweight	
Bruno Arcari	1942		Italy	light welterweight	
Mike Arnaoutis	1979		Greece	light welterweight, welterweight	
McJoe Arroyo	1985		Puerto Rico	super flyweight	
Firat Arslan	1970		Germany	cruiserweight	
Karriss Artingstall	1994		United Kingdom	featherweight	
Rommel Asenjo	1988		Philippines	mini flyweight, light flyweight, flyweight	
Alicia Ashley	1967		United States	super flyweight, bantamweight, super bantamweight, featherweight, super featherweight	
Brahim Asloum (Note: Switch hitter, also boxes orthodox)	1979		France	light flyweight, flyweight	
Emily Asquith	2003		England	light heavyweight	
Tim Austin	1971		United States	bantamweight	
Paulie Ayala	1970		United States	bantamweight, super bantamweight, featherweight	
Carl Baker	1982		United Kingdom	heavyweight	
Károly Balzsay	1979		Hungary	super middleweight	
A. J. Banal	1988		Philippines	super flyweight, bantamweight, super bantamweight	
Paul Banke	1964		United States	super bantamweight	
Kelcie Banks	1965		United States	featherweight	
Carlos Barreto	1976	1999	Venezuela	super bantamweight	
Ismael Barroso	1983		Venezuela	lightweight, light welterweight, welterweight	
Bert Batawang	1971		Philippines	light flyweight	
Albert Batyrgaziev	1998		Russia	super featherweight, featherweight	
Constantin Bejenaru	1984		Moldova	cruiserweight	
Jesse Benavides	1963		United States of America	super bantamweight, featherweight	
Gabriel Bernal	1956	2014	Mexico	flyweight	
Markus Beyer	1971	2018	Germany	light middleweight, super middleweight	
Leandro Blanc	1993		Argentina	light flyweight	
Thomas Blumenfeld	1997		Canada	light welterweight	
Jack Bodell	1940	2016	UK	light heavyweight, heavyweight	
Rolando Bohol	1965		Philippines	flyweight, super flyweight, bantamweight	
Nestor Bolum	1986		Nigeria	bantamweight	
Venice Borkhorsor	1950		Thailand	flyweight, bantamweight	
Junaid Bostan	2002		England	light middleweight	
Lisa Brown	1971		Trinidad and Tobago	bantamweight, super bantamweight, featherweight	
Chris Bourke	1994		England	super-bantamweight, bantamweight	
Stefy Bull	1977		England	lightweight	
Johnny Bumphus	1960	2020	United States of America	light welterweight, welterweight	
Lucian Bute	1980		Romania	super middleweight, light heavyweight	
Gideon Buthelezi	1986		South Africa	minimumweight, light flyweight, super flyweight	
Chris Byrd	1970		United States	light heavyweight, heavyweight	
Anthony Cacace	1989		Northern Ireland	super featherweight	
Joe Calzaghe	1972		Wales	super middleweight, light heavyweight	
Héctor Camacho	1962	2012	Puerto Rico	middleweight	
Jono Carroll	1992		Ireland	lightweight, super featherweight	
Michael Carruth	1967		Ireland	light middleweight	
Jack Catterall	1993		England	light welterweight, welterweight	
Ruslan Chagaev	1978		Uzbekistan	heavyweight	
Rakhim Chakhkiyev	1983		Russia	cruiserweight	
Mark Chamberlain	1999		England	middleweight	
Luis Collazo	1981		United States	welterweight	
Ollie Cooper	2000		England	super middleweight	
Young Corbett III	1905	1993	United States	welterweight, middleweight	
Brandon Daord	1997		England	flyweight, super flyweight	
Gervonta Davis	1994		United States	super featherweight, lightweight, light welterweight	
James Degale	1986		United Kingdom	super middleweight	
Tyler Denny	1991		England	middleweight	
Jazza Dickens	1991		England	super bantamweight, featherweight, super featherweight	
Paddy Donovan	1999		Ireland	welterweight	
Carl Fail	1997		England	light middleweight	
Ginny Fuchs	1988		United States	flyweight, super flyweight	
Jordan Gill	1994		England	featherweight, super featherweight, lightweight	
Freddie Gilroy	1936	2016	Ireland	bantamweight	
Robert Guerrero	1983		United States	welterweight	
Marvin Hagler	1954	2021	United States	middleweight	
Naseem Hamed	1974		England	bantamweight, super bantamweight, featherweight	
Audley Harrison	1971		England	heavyweight	
John Hedges	2002		England	cruiserweight	
Joe Hipp	1962		United States	heavyweight	
Mizuki Hiruta	1996		Japan	flyweight, super flyweight	
Ani Hovsepyan	1998		Armenia	light middleweight, welterweight	
Ryosuke Iwasa	1989		Japan	bantamweight, super bantamweight	
Reggie Johnson	1966		United States	middleweight, light heavyweight	
Zab Judah	1977		United States	light welterweight, welterweight, super welterweight	
Deion Jumah	1989		England	cruiserweight	
Ema Kozin	1998		Slovenia	light middleweight, middleweight, super middleweight	
Yuko Kuroki	1991		Japan	atomweight, mini flyweight	
Daniel Lapin	1997		Ukraine	light heavyweight	
Erislandy Lara	1983		Cuba	light middleweight, middleweight	
Denis Lebedev	1979		Russia	cruiserweight	
Andy Lee	1984		Ireland	light middleweight, middleweight, super middleweight	
Marc Leach	1994		England	super-bantamweight, bantamweight, featherweight	
Jennifer Lehane	1998		Ireland	bantamweight	
Daniel Ponce de León	1980		Mexico	super bantamweight, featherweight, super featherweight	
Rafael Limón	1954		Mexico	super featherweight	
Vasyl Lomachenko	1988		Ukraine	featherweight, super featherweight, lightweight	
Brian Magee	1975		Ireland	super middleweight	
Callum Makin	2003		England	middleweight	
Sergio Martínez	1975		Argentina	welterweight, light middleweight, middleweight	
Henry Maske	1964		Germany	light heavyweight	
Ryūsei Matsumoto	1998		Japan	mini flyweight	
Seán McComb	1992		Ireland	light welterweight	
Conor McGregor	1988		Ireland	light middleweight	
Peter McGrail	1996		England	super bantamweight	
Michael McKinson	1994		England	welterweight	
Freddie Miller	1911	1962	United States	featherweight	
Sharmba Mitchell	1970		United States	light welterweight	
Michael Moorer	1967		United States	light heavyweight, heavyweight	
Skye Nicolson	1995		Australia	featherweight	
Ajose Olusegun	1979		British-Nigerian	light welterweight	
Luis Ortiz	1979		Cuba	heavyweight	
Victor Ortiz	1987		United States	welterweight, light welterweight	
Manny Pacquiao	1978		Philippines	light flyweight, flyweight, super bantamweight, featherweight, super featherweight, lightweight, light welterweight, welterweight, light middleweight	
László Papp	1926	2003	Hungary	middleweight	
Liam Paro	1996		Australia	light welterweight, welterweight	
Jackie Paterson	1920	1966	Scotland	flyweight, bantamweight	
Juan Carlos Payano	1984		Dominican Republic	bantamweight	
Victoire Piteau	1999		France	light welterweight	
Stephanie Piñeiro	1990		Puerto Rico	welterweight, light welterweight	
Robeisy Ramírez	1993		Cuba	featherweight	
Lewis Richardson	1997		England	middleweight, light heavyweight	
Jimmy Sains	2000		England	middleweight	
Corrie Sanders	1966	2012	South Africa	heavyweight	
Billy Joe Saunders	1989		United Kingdom	middleweight, super middleweight	
Sam Sheedy	2000		England	middleweight	
Errol Spence Jr.	1990		United States	welterweight	
Adonis Stevenson	1977		Haiti	super middleweight, light heavyweight	
Jovanni Straffon	1993		Mexico	lightweight	
Carly Skelly	1986		England	bantamweight, super bantamweight	
Marlon Tapales	1992		Philippines	light flyweight, flyweight, super flyweight, bantamweight, super bantamweight, featherweight, super featherweight	
Josh Taylor	1991		Scotland	light welterweight	
Darren Tetley	1993		England	welterweight, light welterweight	
Damar Thomas	2004		England	heavyweight, super heavyweight	
Tammara Thibeault	1996		Canada	middleweight	
Shakiel Thompson	1997		England	middleweight	
Constantin Ursu	2000		Romania	welterweight	
Oleksandr Usyk	1987		Ukraine	cruiserweight, heavyweight	
Edwin Valero	1981	2010	Venezuela	super featherweight, lightweight	
Ben Vaughan	1999		England	welterweight	
Aira Villegas	1995		Philippines	light flyweight, bantamweight	
Giorgio Visioli	2003		England	super featherweight, lightweight	
Gerome Warburton	1995		Wales	middleweight	
Pernell Whitaker	1964	2019	United States	lightweight, light welterweight, welterweight, light middleweight	
Sumire Yamanaka	2001		Japan	atomweight	
Ivan Zucco	1995		Italy	super middleweight	
