= Ashley Lane (boxer) =

English boxer (born 1990)

Personal information
- Nickname: Flash
- Nationality: English
- Born: 1 October 1990 (age 35) Northampton, England
- Weight: Bantamweight; Super-bantamweight; Featherweight

Boxing career
- Stance: Orthodox

Boxing record
- Total fights: 31
- Wins: 18
- Win by KO: 3
- Losses: 11
- Draws: 2

Ashley Lane (born 1 October 1990) is an English professional boxer. He held the Commonwealth super-bantamweight title from 2017 to 2019 and the British and Commonwealth bantamweight titles in 2024.

== Professional career ==
Lane made his professional debut on 1 April 2011, fighting to a second-round technical draw in a four-round bout against Ryan McNicol at the Park Inn Hotel in Northampton. The contest was stopped after Lane suffered a cut due to an accidental clash of heads. Lane defeated McNicol in an immediate rematch at the same venue in the following July, winning by points decision (PTS) over four-rounds. In his next fight he suffered the first defeat of his career, losing by third-round technical knockout (TKO) against Jonathan Fry in October, before fighting to a draw against future world title challenger, Gavin McDonnell, in March 2012.

After two more wins and another loss, he faced future British bantamweight champion, Josh Wale, for the vacant British Masters super-bantamweight title on 29 March 2013 at the Barnsley Metrodome. After being knocked down twice in the ninth, Lane quit on his stool at the end of the round to suffer the third defeat of his career, losing via ninth-round corner retirement (RTD).

After three more fights – two wins and a stoppage loss to future world champion Kal Yafai – Lane stepped in as a late replacement to face Dai Davies after his original opponent, Kris Jones, pulled out due to suffering from the flu. The bout took place on 24 October 2014 at the Rhydycar Leisure Centre in Merthyr Tydfil, Wales, with the vacant International Masters featherweight title on the line. Lane suffered his fifth professional defeat, losing via PTS over ten rounds.

In his next fight he suffered his second consecutive defeat and the sixth of his career, losing by seventh-round TKO to Ryan Farrag for the vacant English bantamweight title on 13 December 2014 at the Hillsborough Leisure Centre in Sheffield. He came back from defeat to capture the vacant Midlands Area bantamweight title by defeating Brett Fidoe via PTS on 27 March 2015 at the City Academy Sports Centre in Bristol, before failing in his second attempt for the vacant English title, losing to Jason Cunningham via ten-round unanimous decision (UD) on 27 February 2016 at the Doncaster Dome.

Six fights later – with four wins and one loss – he fought Michael Ramabeletsa on 23 September 2017 in a rematch of their 2012 bout, in which Ramabeletsa won, for the vacant Commonwealth super-bantamweight title. Lane got his revenge over Ramabeletsa, winning by UD to capture the Commonwealth title at the PlayFootball Arena in Swindon. The judges scorecards reading 117–112, 116–112 and 116–113. After two PTS wins in non-title fights, he faced British super-bantamweight champion, Brad Foster, on 18 May 2019 at the Lamex Stadium in Stevenage. After being knocked down once in the first round and again in the twelfth, Lane lost by TKO after the referee called a halt to the contest with just two seconds remaining of the final round.

Lane won the vacant English bantamweight title when his opponent, Jordan Purkiss, retired at the end of the seventh round of their fight in Brentwood on 17 June 2022. In his next bout, he faced Chris Bourke for the vacant British and Commonwealth bantamweight titles at York Hall in London on 22 March 2024, winning via stoppage in the sixth round. Lane lost the titles in his first defense against Andrew Cain at Resorts World Arena in Birmingham on 20 July 2024. The fight was halted in the fifth round after he was knocked to the canvas twice.

== Professional boxing record ==
31 fights	18 wins	11 losses
By knockout	3	7
By decision	15	4
Draws	2	

No.	Result	Record	Opponent	Type	Round, time	Date	Location	Notes
31	Loss	18–10–2	(United Kingdom) Andrew Cain	TKO	5 (12)	20 Jul 2024	(United Kingdom) Resorts World Arena, Birmingham, England	Lost the British and Commonwealth bantamweight titles
30	Win	18–9–2	(United Kingdom) Chris Bourke	TKO	6 (12)	22 Mar 2024	(United Kingdom) York Hall, London, England	Won the vacant British and Commonwealth bantamweight titles
29	Win	17–9–2	(United Kingdom) Jordan Purkiss	RTD	7 (10)	17 Jun 2022	(United Kingdom) Brentwood Centre, Brentwood, England	Won the vacant English bantamweight title
28	Win	16–9–2	(United Kingdom) Stephen Jackson	PTS	4	14 May 2022	(United Kingdom) The Galleries, Bristol, England	
27	Win	15–9–2	(United Kingdom) Luke Fash	PTS	4	11 Dec 2021	(United Kingdom) Chepstow Racecourse, Chepstow, England	
26	Loss	14–10–2	(United Kingdom) Qais Ashfaq	TKO	4 (8), 0:20	12 Dec 2020	(United Kingdom) The SSE Arena, London, England	
25	Win	14–9–2	(Nicaragua) Jose Aguilar	PTS	6	19 Jul 2019	(United Kingdom) Cheese and Grain Hall, Frome, England	
24	Loss	13–9–2	(United Kingdom) Brad Foster	TKO	12 (12), 2:58	18 May 2019	(United Kingdom) Lamex Stadium, Stevenage, England	Lost Commonwealth super-bantamweight title; For British super-bantamweight title
23	Win	13–8–2	(United Kingdom) Ricky Leach	PTS	4	27 Oct 2018	(United Kingdom) Newport Centre, Newport, Wales	
22	Win	12–8–2	(Ghana) Isaac Quaye	PTS	8	16 Mar 2018	(United Kingdom) Dolman Exhibition Centre, Bristol, England	
21	Win	11–8–2	(South Africa) Michael Ramabelesta	UD	12	23 Sep 2017	(United Kingdom) PlayFootball Arena, Swindon, England	Won vacant Commonwealth super-bantamweight title
20	Win	10–8–2	(United Kingdom) Andy Harris	PTS	6	30 Jun 2017	(United Kingdom) Cheese and Grain Hall, Frome, England	
19	Win	9–8–2	(United Kingdom) Paul Economides	PTS	6	27 May 2017	(United Kingdom) Bowlers Exhibition Centre, Manchester, England	
18	Win	8–8–2	(United Kingdom) Thomas Kindon	PTS	6	13 May 2017	(United Kingdom) First Direct Arena, Leeds, England	
17	Loss	7–8–2	(United Kingdom) Josh Wale	PTS	10	1 Oct 2016	(United Kingdom) Dearne Valley Leisure Centre, Denaby Main, England	
16	Win	7–7–2	(United Kingdom) Craig Derbyshire	PTS	6	8 Jul 2016	(United Kingdom) Dolman Exhibition Hall, Bristol, England	
15	Loss	6–7–2	(United Kingdom) Jason Cunningham	PTS	10	27 Feb 2016	(United Kingdom) Doncaster Dome, Doncaster, England	For vacant English bantamweight title
14	Win	6–6–2	(United Kingdom) Brett Fidoe	PTS	10	27 Mar 2015	(United Kingdom) City Academy Sports Centre, Bristol, England	Won vacant Midlands Area bantamweight title
13	Loss	5–6–2	(United Kingdom) Ryan Farrag	TKO	7 (10), 2:03	13 Dec 2014	(United Kingdom) Hillsborough Leisure Centre, Sheffield, England	For vacant English bantamweight title
12	Loss	5–5–2	(United Kingdom) Dai Davies	PTS	10	24 Oct 2014	(United Kingdom) Rhydycar Leisure Centre, Merthyr Tydfil, Wales	For vacant International Masters Gold featherweight title
11	Win	5–4–2	(United Kingdom) Anwar Alfadli	PTS	4	1 Mar 2014	(United Kingdom) City Academy Sports Centre, Bristol, England	
10	Loss	4–4–2	(United Kingdom) Kal Yafai	TKO	4 (6), 2:59	14 Dec 2013	(United Kingdom) ExCel Arena, London, England	
9	Win	4–3–2	(United Kingdom) James Ancliff	RTD	3 (4), 2:00	3 May 2013	(United Kingdom) The Venue, Dudley, England	
8	Loss	3–3–2	(United Kingdom) Josh Wale	RTD	9 (10), 3:00	29 Mar 2013	(United Kingdom) Barnsley Metrodome, Barnsley, England	For vacant British Masters super-bantamweight title
7	Win	3–2–2	(United Kingdom) Harvey Hemsley	PTS	4	8 Sep 2012	(United Kingdom) Park Inn Hotel, Northampton, England	
6	Loss	2–2–2	(South Africa) Michael Ramabelesta	PTS	6	7 Jul 2012	(United Kingdom) Hand Arena, Clevedon, England	
5	Win	2–1–2	(United Kingdom) Delroy Spencer	PTS	4	16 Mar 2012	(United Kingdom) Civic Hall, Bedworth, England	
4	Draw	1–1–2	(United Kingdom) Gavin McDonnell	PTS	4	2 Mar 2012	(United Kingdom) Doncaster Dome, Doncaster, England	
3	Loss	1–1–1	(United Kingdom) Jonathan Fry	TKO	3 (4), 0:56	15 Oct 2011	(United Kingdom) Liquid & Envy Nightclub, Portsmouth, England	
2	Win	1–0–1	(United Kingdom) Ryan McNicol	PTS	4	2 Jul 2011	(United Kingdom) Park Inn Hotel, Northampton, England	
1	Draw	0–0–1	(United Kingdom) Ryan McNicol	TD	2 (4)	1 Apr 2011	(United Kingdom) Park Inn Hotel, Northampton, England	Fight stopped after Lane cut from accidental head clash
