= Andrew Cain (boxer) =

English boxer (born 1996)

Personal information
- Born: 3 August 1996 (age 30) Liverpool, England
- Height: 5 ft 4 in (163 cm)
- Weight: Bantamweight; Super-bantamweight

Boxing career
- Stance: Orthodox

Boxing record
- Total fights: 16
- Wins: 15
- Win by KO: 13
- Losses: 1

Andrew Cain (born 3 August 1996) is an English professional boxer. He is a former British and Commonwealth bantamweight champion.

== Career ==
A professional since 2015, Cain signed a promotional contract with Frank Warren's Queensbury Promotions in 2020.

Unbeaten in his first eight fights, he stopped Pablo Ariel Gomez just 19 seconds into the first round of their contest at the International Centre in Telford on 16 April 2022, to claim the vacant WBC International Silver super-bantamweight title.

Cain successfully defended his title with another first round stoppage win over Luis Moreno at York Hall in London on 20 May 2022.

His next defense was against Ionut Baluta at the International Centre in Telford on 25 March 2023. Cain lost the bout by split decision.

Having taken 13 months away from boxing to recover from a hand injury, he returned to the ring with a fourth-round knockout of Darwing Martinez at York Hall on 20 April 2024.

Cain challenged British and Commonwealth bantamweight champion Ashley Lane at bp pulse LIVE in Birmingham on 20 July 2024. The fight was halted in the fifth round after he knocked his opponent to the canvas twice.

In his next outing, he stopped Lazaro Casseres in the second of their scheduled 10 rounds at Liverpool Arena on 5 October 2024, to win the vacant WBC International Silver bantamweight title.

Cain returned to Liverpool Arena to defend his British and Commonwealth titles against Charlie Edwards on 15 March 2025, with the vacant WBC Silver bantamweight championship also on the line. He won by split decision with two of the ringside judges scoring the fight 116–112 and 115–114 respectively in his favour while the third had it 115–113 for his opponent.

Once again at Liverpool Arena, Cain faced Alejandro Jair Gonzalez on 7 February 2026. The fight was a final eliminator for a shot at the WBC bantamweight title. Recovering from being sent to the canvas twice in the eighth round, Cain scored two knockdowns of his own in round nine, with the referee stopping the bout following the second to give him the win by technical knockout.

== Professional boxing record ==
16 fights	15 wins	1 loss
By knockout	13	0
By decision	2	1

No.	Result	Record	Opponent	Type	Round, time	Date	Location	Notes
16	Win	15–1	Alejandro Jair Gonzalez	TKO	9 (12), 1:22	7 Feb 2026	Liverpool Arena, Liverpool, England	
15	Win	14–1	Charlie Edwards	SD	12	15 Mar 2025	Liverpool Arena, Liverpool, England	Retained British and Commonwealth bantamweight titles; won vacant WBC Silver bantamweight title
14	Win	13–1	Lazaro Casseres	TKO	2 (10), 1:48	5 Oct 2024	Liverpool Arena, Liverpool, England	Won vacant WBC International Silver bantamweight title
13	Win	12–1	Ashley Lane	TKO	5 (12), 1:47	20 Jul 2024	bp pulse LIVE, Birmingham, England	Won British and Commonwealth bantamweight titles
12	Win	11–1	Darwing Martinez	KO	4 (8), 1:27	20 Apr 2024	York Hall, London, England	
11	Loss	10–1	Ionut Baluta	SD	10	25 Mar 2023	International Centre, Telford, England	Lost WBC International Silver super-bantamweight title
10	Win	10–0	Luis Moreno	KO	1 (10), 2:02	20 May 2022	York Hall, London, England	Retained WBC International Silver super-bantamweight title
9	Win	9–0	Pablo Ariel Gomez	TKO	1 (10), 0:19	16 Apr 2022	International Centre, Telford, England	Won vacant WBC International Silver super-bantamweight title
8	Win	8–0	Uriel Lopez Juarez	TKO	6 (6), 0:02	6 Nov 2021	Utilita Arena, Birmingham, England	
7	Win	7–0	Stephen Jackson	PTS	4	30 Apr 2021	York Hall, London, England	
6	Win	6–0	Ed Harrison	RTD	3 (6), 3:00	31 Jul 2020	BT Sport Studio, London, England	
5	Win	5–0	Rafael Castillo	TKO	1 (4), 2:33	28 Feb 2020	Grand Central Hall, Liverpool, England	
4	Win	4–0	Elvis Guillen	TKO	2 (4), 1:25	21 Sep 2019	Greenbank Sports Academy, Liverpool, England	
3	Win	3–0	Steven White	TKO	3 (4), 2:48	4 May 2019	Greenbank Sports Academy, Liverpool, England	
2	Win	2–0	Luke Fash	TKO	2 (4)	17 Oct 2015	Grand Central Hall, Liverpool, England	
1	Win	1–0	Patrik Bartos	TKO	2 (4), 2:16	18 Apr 2015	Liverpool Arena, Liverpool, England	
