= Brad Foster (boxer) =

British boxer

Personal information
- Nickname: The Blade
- Born: 22 October 1997 (age 28) Walsall, West Midlands, England
- Height: 5 ft (152 cm) 7
- Weight: Super-bantamweight

Boxing career
- Stance: Orthodox

Boxing record
- Total fights: 21
- Wins: 15
- Win by KO: 5
- Losses: 4
- Draws: 2

Brad Foster (born 22 October 1997) is a British professional boxer who held the British and Commonwealth super-bantamweight titles between 2019 and 2021.

== Early life ==
Brad Foster was born on 22 October 1997 in Walsall, England. At the age of 9 he took up kickboxing. After winning multiple kickboxing championships including British, European and world titles, he turned to boxing aged 18.

== Professional career ==
Foster made his professional debut on 5 December 2015, winning a four-round points decision over Josh O'Donnell at the Town Hall in Dudley, West Midlands.

In November 2016, he signed a three-year promotional contract with Frank Warren's Queensberry Promotions.

On 20 July 2018, He fought Leon Gower (6–0–0) for the vacant British Midlands Area super-bantamweight title at the Banks's Stadium in Walsall. Foster won the title via eighth-round stoppage.

His next fight came on 8 March 2019 against former British bantamweight champion Josh Wale (27–10–2) for the vacant British super-bantamweight title at the Barnsley Metrodome in Barnsley, Yorkshire. Foster captured the British title by unanimous decision, with the scorecards reading 119–111, 117–112 and 117–111.

On 18 May 2019, he challenged Commonwealth super-bantamweight champion Ashley Lane (13–8–2) at the Lamex Stadium in Stevenage, Hertfordshire. Foster won via twelfth-round technical knockout (TKO), adding the Commonwealth title to his collection, after referee Mark Lyson called a halt to the contest with 12 seconds remaining in the final round.

He next fought Lucien Reid (8–0–1) on 14 September 2019 at the York Hall in London. Foster retained his British and Commonwealth titles through a majority draw. Two judges scored the bout 114–114, while the third scored it 112–116 in favour of Reid.

On 28 September 2024, Foster was stopped in the second round by Peter McGrail at Canon Medical Arena in Sheffield, England.

== Professional boxing record ==
21 fights	15 wins	4 losses
By knockout	5	1
By decision	10	3
Draws	2	

No.	Result	Record	Opponent	Type	Round, time	Date	Location	Notes
21	Loss	15–4–2	Peter McGrail	KO	2 (10) 1:08	28 Sep 2024	Canon Medical Arena, Sheffield, England	
20	Loss	15–3–2	Rhys Edwards	PTS	10	18 Nov 2023	Civic Hall, Wolverhampton, England	
19	Win	15–2–2	Joshua Ocampo	PTS	6	16 Dec 2022	The Hangar Events Venue, Wolverhampton, England	
18	Loss	14–2–2	Ionut Baluta	UD	10	20 May 2022	York Hall, Bethnal Green, England	For vacant WBC International super-bantamweight title
17	Loss	14–1–2	Jason Cunningham	UD	12	9 Oct 2021	Utilita Arena, Birmingham, England	Lost IBF International super-bantamweight title For EBU, Commonwealth and BBBofC super-bantamweight titles
16	Win	14–0–2	Alvaro Rodriguez	UD	10	26 Mar 2021	Copper Box Arena, London, England	Won vacant IBF International super-bantamweight title
15	Win	13–0–2	James Beech Jr.	UD	12	10 Jul 2020	BT Sport Studio, London, England	Retained British and Commonwealth super-bantamweight titles
14	Win	12–0–2	Lucien Reid	RTD	6 (12), 3:00	22 Feb 2020	York Hall, London, England	Retained British super-bantamweight title
13	Draw	11–0–2	Lucien Reid	MD	12	14 Sep 2019	York Hall, London, England	Retained British and Commonwealth super-bantamweight titles
12	Win	11–0–1	Ashley Lane	TKO	12 (12), 2:58	18 May 2019	Lamex Stadium, Stevenage, England	Retained British super-bantamweight title; Won Commonwealth super-bantamweight title
11	Win	10–0–1	Josh Wale	UD	12	8 Mar 2019	Barnsley Metrodome, Barnsley, England	Won vacant British super-bantamweight title
10	Win	9–0–1	Leon Gower	RTD	8 (10), 3:00	20 Jul 2018	Banks's Stadium, Walsall, England	Won Midlands Area super-bantamweight title
9	Win	8–0–1	Edward Bjorklund	PTS	6	14 Apr 2018	King Power Stadium, Leicester, England	
8	Win	7–0–1	Patrik Bartos	TKO	1 (6), 1:41	2 Dec 2017	Leicester Arena, Leicester, England	
7	Draw	6–0–1	Brett Fidoe	PTS	6	24 Jun 2017	Villa Park, Birmingham, England	
6	Win	6–0	Leonard Rafael	TKO	1 (6), 2:23	17 Feb 2017	Banks's Stadium, Walsall, England	
5	Win	5–0	Anwar Alfadli	PTS	6	8 Oct 2016	Holiday Inn, Birmingham, England	
4	Win	4–0	Sergey Tasimov	PTS	4	16 Jul 2016	PlayFootball Arena, Birmingham, England	
3	Win	3–0	Jordan Turner	PTS	4	21 May 2016	Town Hall, Dudley, England	
2	Win	2–0	Gary Reeve	PTS	4	4 Mar 2016	The Venue, Dudley, England	
1	Win	1–0	Josh O'Donnell	PTS	4	5 Dec 2015	Town Hall, Dudley, England	

Regional boxing titles
Vacant Title last held by Chris Edwards	Midlands Area super-bantamweight champion 20 July 2018 – February 2019; Vacated	Vacant
Vacant Title last held by Thomas Patrick Ward	British super-bantamweight champion 8 March 2019 – present	Incumbent
Preceded by Ashley Lane	Commonwealth super-bantamweight champion 18 May 2019 – present	Incumbent
