= Kal Yafai =

English boxer (born 1989)

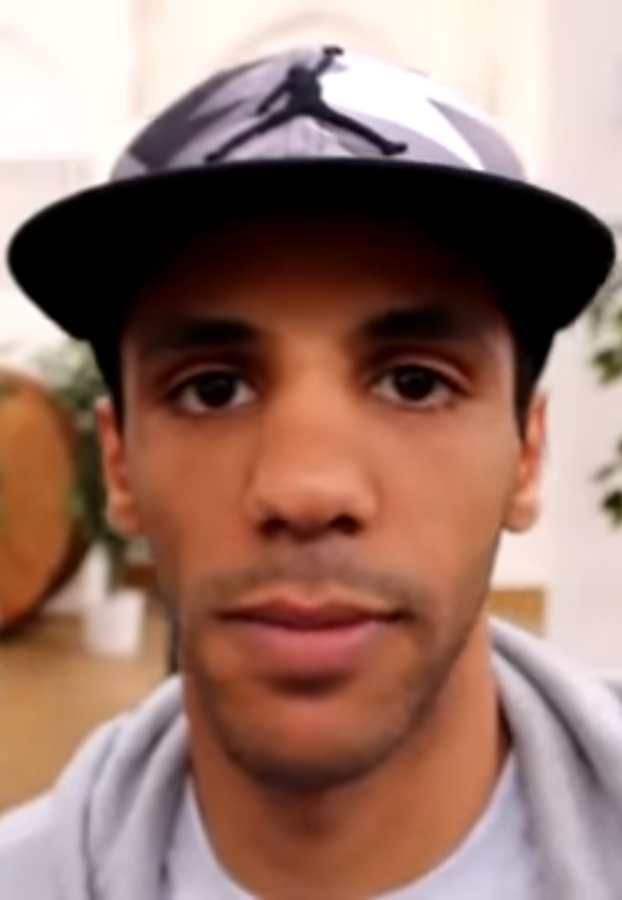
- Yafai in 2015

Personal information
- Born: Khalid Yafai; 11 June 1989 (age 37) Birmingham, West Midlands, England
- Height: 5 ft 4 in (163 cm)
- Weight: Super flyweight

Boxing career
- Stance: Orthodox

Boxing record
- Total fights: 29
- Wins: 27
- Win by KO: 15
- Losses: 2
Medal record
Men's amateur boxing
Representing Great Britain
European Championships
Silver medal – second place	2010 Moscow	Flyweight

Khalid "Kal" Yafai (Arabic: خالد يافعي; born 11 June 1989) is a British former professional boxer who held the WBA super-flyweight title from 2016 to 2020. As an amateur, he represented Great Britain at the 2008 Summer Olympics and won a silver medal at the 2010 European Championships.

== Amateur career ==
Yafai is the son of Yemeni parents. He currently lives in the Moseley area of Birmingham. Yafai has two brothers who are also boxers. Gamal Yafai is a professional boxer and Galal Yafai is an Olympic flyweight boxing champion.

In June 2005, he won a silver medal in the European Cadet Championships in Hungary, recording 4 wins before losing in the final to Russian Farid Aleshkin. He received the BBC Midlands 2005 "Junior Sportsman of the Year" award, after he became England's first ever U17 World Boxing Champion, when he won the World Cadet title winning the junior flyweight title against Luis Yáñez of the United States.

Fighting for Birmingham City ABC, he became one of the youngest British (ABA) champions in December 2006 while still 17, at the World Junior Championships 2006 in Agadir, Morocco. He lost in the quarter-final to the eventual Cuban winner Alexei Collado.

At the 2007 European Junior Championships, he lost in the 51K final to Russian Misha Aloyan. As Britain's youngest team member at the 2007 Seniors World Championship, the 18-year-old beat his Armenian opponent Derenik Gizhlaryan, but later lost to Violito Payla of the Philippines.

He then qualified for the 2008 Summer Olympics in Beijing in the 1st Olympic qualifying event in Pescara, Italy, where he stopped teammate Mo Nasir of Wales and then went on to beat the 2004 Olympian Igor Samolencko of Moldova to qualify. He then pulled out of the final due to injury.

After qualifying for the 2008 Olympic Games he participated in the 2008 European union championships in Poland where he won a silver medal beating former olympic boxer Redouane Asloum of France (RSCO2) in the semi-finals but then losing a controversial 13–10 decision to home favourite and Beijing Olympian Rafal Kaczor.

At the Olympic Games, Khalid was beaten in the round of 16 by Cuban veteran Andry Laffita who went on to claim the silver medal. Khalid was absent at the 2008 European Amateur Boxing Championships in Liverpool, England but made a return in the GeeBee Championship in April 2009 in the 54 kg class (bantamweight) and claimed gold beating European silver medalist Salomo N'tuve of Sweden.

Yafai lost to Andrew Selby 26:12 on 11 November 2011 to deny him qualification for the 2012 Olympic Games after the pair both reached the last eight of the 2011 GB Amateur Boxing Championships in Baku. Yafai and Selby were scheduled to face each other three times to decide the winner, but Yafai pulled out of the second fight, thus handing a shot of the Olympics to the Welshman.

In 2012, Yafai was named "Young Boxer of the Year" by the British website BoxRec.

== Professional career ==
=== Early career ===
On 7 July 2012, Yafai made his professional debut, aged 23, at bantamweight, at the Sheffield Arena in Sheffield on the undercard of Kell Brook vs. Carson Jones. His opponent was veteran 43 year old Delroy Spencer (14–139–3, 1 KO). The fight was stopped after Spencer refused to come out for round 3. In his second fight, Yafai defeated Hungarian boxer Richard Voros via first-round TKO. Two weeks later, Yafai was against Mexican Victor Koh at the Odyssey Arena, Belfast. This was on the undercard off Frampton-Molitor. The fight went the full 6 rounds, as referee Paul McCullagh scored it 60–54 in favour of Yafai. On 20 October, Yafai knocked down Scott Gladwin (5–1) three times in round 1 and once in round 2 as the referee waved the fight off, giving Yafai the victory via TKO. A month later on the undercard of Froch vs. Mack at the Nottingham Arena in Nottingham, Yafai knocked out Italian boxer Pio Antonio Nettuno in round 1 in a super bantamweight bout, after a body shot. Nettuno could not make the count.

In December 2012, Yafai fought Spanish boxer Jorge Perez (11–5, 6 KOs) at the Olympia in Kensington, London. Yafai won the fight via 3rd-round TKO. In January 2013, Yafai defeated Mexican boxer Gonzalo Garcia, after Garcia did not come out of his corner for round 5. In March, Yafai fought in an 8-round super bantamweight bout against Michael Ramabeletsa (8–9, 4 KOs) at the Echo Arena in Liverpool. It went the full 8 rounds as referee Alvin Finch scored it 79–73 in favour of Yafai. After a 7-month lay off, on the undercard of Brook vs. Senchenko at the Sheffield Arena in October 2013, Yafai defeateds Spanish boxer Santiago Bustos via points (59–55) after 6 rounds. Two months later in December, although being docked a point for a low blow, Yafai defeated British boxer Ashley Lane (4–3–2, 1 KO) via fourth-round TKO.

=== Domestic & regional success ===
On 21 May 2014, Yafai fought at the First Direct Arena in Leeds for the vacant Commonwealth super flyweight title against Nigerian contender and former titleholder Yaqub Kareem (13–3–1, 8 KOs). With 30 seconds remaining in round 3, Yafai knocked down Kareem with a body shot to claim the vacant title. For the first time in his career, in September 2014, Yafai fought at the Wembley Arena in London live on Sky Sports. His opponent was 34 year old Nicaragua Herald Molina (17–8–3, 7 KOs) for the vacant IBF Inter-Continental super flyweight title. Yafai knocked Molina down once in round 1, before finishing the fight off in round 2 via KO.

Yafai defended the title two months later at 3Arena in Dublin, Ireland against 38 year old Everth Briceno (35–9–2, 26 KOs). Briceno was knocked down in round five and twice in round eight. Briceno also lost one point in round six for low blows. The fight went the full 12 rounds as Yafai retained the title via unanimous decision (119–106, 118–105,120-104). This was Yafai's 13th straight win since turning professional in 2012.

In March 2015, Yafai went the 8 round distance with 20 year old Cristofer Rosales in a non-title bout at the Sheffield Arena. Two months later, he knocked out 35 year old veteran Isaac Quaye (27–10–1, 18 KOs) in just one round following a left hook. In September 2015, Yafai fought 20 year old Nicaraguan boxer Aron Juarez (6–2–1) at the First Direct Arena. Yafai knocked Juarez down twice in round one following two left hooks to the body.

It was announced that Yafai would have a chance to claim the vacant BBBofC British super flyweight title on 17 October 2015 against Jason Cunningham (17–2, 6 KOs) at the Barclaycard Arena in Birmingham, live on Sky Sports 1. Despite a height disadvantage, Yafai outclassed Cunningham from the opening bell winning a clear unanimous decision (119–108, 120–107, 120–107). The highlights of the fight came in round 5 when Yafai connected with a double left hook, staggering Cunningham and then knocked him down in round 6. After the fight Yafai targeted the WBA super-flyweight champion Kohei Kono as a potential next opponent.

Yafai's next opponent was former world title challenger from Nicaragua Dixon Flores (12–3–2, 4 KOs) on 5 March 2016 at the Genting Arena for the vacant WBA Inter-Continental super flyweight title, with the winner due a shot at WBA champion Kohei Kono in the summer. This was Yafai's fifth opponent from Nicaragua in less than two years. The fight lasted less than two minutes as Yafai floored Flores twice in the first round to secure a world title shot and the vacant title.

On 25 June, Yafai fought 19 year old Hungarian Jozsef Ajtai (15–3, 10 KOs) in a scheduled 8 round bantamweight bout at the O2 Arena in London on the undercard of heavyweight title fight between Anthony Joshua and Dominic Breazeale. Yafai floored Ajtai twice in round 1, with the fight stopping just under 2 minutes. Yafai winning via TKO.

Yafai was added to the Eggington vs. Gavin card on 22 October 2016 at the Barclaycard Arena in a scheduled 8 round fight after his brother Gamal was forced to pull out of his title defence. Yafai secured his world title fight after a left body shot floored Johnson Tellez in round 3.

=== WBA Super flyweight champion ===
==== Yafai vs. Concepción ====
Yafai secured a fight with WBA super flyweight champion Luis Concepción (35–4, 24 KOs) after knocking out previous opponent Tellez. Eddie Hearn confirmed it would take place on the undercard of Anthony Joshua vs. Éric Molina on 10 December at the Manchester Arena. With a win, Yafai looked to become the first boxer from Birmingham to win a world title in over 100 years. At the official weigh in, Yafai weighed in at 8st 2lbs and Concepción weighed 8st 5lbs, which was above the limit. He was given an hour to drop the extra weight or risk not having the title at stake. Two hours after the initial weigh in, Concepción only managed to lose 0.3lbs, thus losing his WBA title on the scales. The title was only at stake for Yafai. Yafai put in a dominant performance and outscored Concepción in nearly every round to win the WBA super-flyweight title. The judges scored the bout 120–108, 117-110 and 119-108 all in favour of Yafai after 12 rounds. Yafai also became the first boxer from Birmingham to win a world title in over 100 years.

==== Yafai vs. Muranaka ====
On 25 January 2017, it was announced that Yafai, as wished, would make his first world title defence in his home city of Birmingham on 13 May, live on Sky Sports. On 15 March 2017, promoter Eddie Hearn announced that Yafai would be fighting 31 year old former Japanese flyweight champion Suguru Muranaka (25–2–1, 8 KOs) at the Barclaycard Arena in Birmingham. After the fight was confirmed, Yafai said that he wanted the tough fights as it would help him when it comes to unification fights. In his 13-years as a professional, it was the first time Muranaka fought outside of Tokyo, where all his previous 28 bouts took place at the Korakuen Hall. Yafai retained his world title, in what was seen as a 'touger than expected' fight. The fight went the 12 round distance, with scores reading 118–108, 119-107 and 119–107, all in favour of Yafai. Muranaka was dropped in round 2, the same round that Yafai claimed to have hurt his hand in the post fight. Referee Steve Gray warned Yafai early in the fight for low blows, before docking a point in round 8. The bout was fast-paced throughout, which caused Yafai to look tired in the later rounds, due to him landing constant power shots in the earlier rounds and Muranaka connecting with his own body shots to wear him down. After the fight, promoter Eddie Hearn said that he would have one more defence before taking part in a unification fight.

==== Yafai vs. Ishida ====
On 8 June 2017, the WBA's championship committee ordered Yafai to start negotiations with mandatory challenger Sho Ishida (24–0, 13 KOs), who was ranked at number 1 by the organisation. Both parties had 30 days to come to an agreement. On 12 July, Hearn confirmed that terms had been agreed for the fight. On 6 September it was confirmed that the fight would take place on the undercard of Anthony Joshua defending his world titles against Kubrat Pulev on 28 October 2017 at the Millennium Stadium on Sky Sports Box Office. Much like Yafai's previous opponent Muranaka, it would also mark the first time Ishida would be fighting outside of Japan. Towards the end of September, WBA ranked former WBC champion Roman González as their number 2. Teiken Promotions, who promote González was said to be looking to arrange a fight against Yafai. Upon hearing this, Yafai was excited at the possibility of fighting González as had made it know public that he was interested. Yafai said, "Happy days, I've wanted González for a long time", although he said wouldn't look past his mandatory fight first. Speaking on Ishida, Yafai said, "I'm a huge favorite to win and a lot of people think Ishida has no chance, but I'm always on the ball. I look at every opponent like they're Mike Tyson. If everything goes well, I can talk to (promoter) Eddie (Hearn) and we can look to make the González fight". González stated he would next look to fight in February 2018.

On fight night, Yafai went the 12 round distance for the third consecutive time, winning a unanimous decision, successfully retaining his WBA title and increasing his chances of fighting in the United States in 2018. All three judges' scored the fight comfortably 118–110, 116-112 and 116–112 in favour of Yafai. Yafai showed off his speed and landed good combinations. Due to Ishida's size advantage, he also landed some clean shots on Yafai. Ishida did not letting his hands go until the final two rounds. By this point, it was looking like a clear win for Yafai and Ishida was lacking the punching power to get himself back in the fight and score a knockdown. Ishida worked hard in round 11, however Yafai connected with the harder punches. In the post-fight, Yafai said, "I wasn't too impressed [with my performance]. A bit sluggish, but I got the win against an awkward opponent". He also stated that he would like to fight again in the Spring of 2018.

==== Yafai vs. Carmona ====
On 20 May 2018, it was announced by Top Rank's Carl Moretti that Yafai would make his US debut on 26 May against 26 year old Mexican boxer David Carmona (21–5–5, 9 KOs) on the same card as IBF belt-holder Jerwin Ancajas, who would be making a mandatory defence against Jonas Sultan. With both bouts streaming live on ESPN's new subscription app, the plan going forward was for both Yafai and Ancajas to come out of their respective bouts victorious and meet later in the year for a unification fight. Carmona was best known for going the distance but failing to capture the WBO title against Naoya Inoue in May 2016, becoming one of only two boxers to date to take Inoue the distance. Save Mart Center in Fresno, California was announced as the venue. Carmona was unable to challenge for the WBA title after coming in 118½ pounds at the weigh in. Yafai weighed 114½ pounds. Yafai had an official purse of $40,000 which did not include the extra amount he would receive for TV rights in the UK. Carmona had to pay a 20% fine from his $10,000 purse and from that fine, $1,000 was added to Yafai's purse and the remaining $1,000 was paid to the California Commission.

Yafai dropped Carmona four times in the fight en route to winning the fight after round 7 when Carmona decided to stay on his stool The first round was fast-paced with Yafai scoring an early knockdown with a left hook to the head. Carmona beat the count and later in the round managed to hurt Yafai. Yafai also hit the canvas in round 1, however it was ruled a slip. Yafai regained his composure and returned to his quick jabs in round 2. Carmona started connecting to the body. Yafai landed quick jabs in round 3 snapping Carmona's head back each time. In round 4, Yafai landed a borderline shot which floored Carmona once again. Carmona was knocked down twice in round 5. One knockdown, which again appeared to be borderline, was counted. Referee Raul Caiz Sr. ruled it a knockdown but also took a point away from Yafai for hitting Carmona when he was already down. The point was deducted after many warnings. By rounds 6 and 7, Carmona looked fatigued and Yafai dominated both rounds. Promoter Hearn stated a fight with former world champion Roman González could be next. He told Sky Sports, "He is ready for the challenge of unification but we also really like the Chocolatito fight and have already opened talks with his team". Hearn, who has promoted Yafai since he debuted highly praised him on his performance.

==== Yafai vs. Gonzalez ====
Matchroom Boxing announced a third annual Monte-Carlo Boxing Bonanza show to take place at the Casino de Monte Carlo Salle Medecin on 24 November 2018. Yafai along with former cruiserweight world champion Denis Lebedev were chosen to co-headline the event. Yafai's fourth title defense was set to take place on the event against Mexican boxer, former world title challenger Israel González (23–2, 10 KOs). Gonzalez failed in an attempt to capture the IBF title against Jerwin Ancajas. After appearing on the same card in May 2018, there was discussion that Yafai and Ancajas would unify, however that did not materialise. On his first attempt, Yafai weighed slightly over the 8st 3lb limit. He was given two hours to lose the small amount, however weighed again immediately without his pants, making weight the second time. Yafai retained his WBA title via a controversial 12 round unanimous decision. The three judges scored the fight 117–111, 116-112 and 116–112 in favour of Yafai. Many media outlets believed Gonzalez has done just enough to snatch the world title. Yafai started the fight slow, targeting Gonzalez's body while Gonzalez was off the mark quicker with his high tempo, throwing at a higher output. Yafai struggled to find the right distance and began missing his target. Gonzalez was cut due to a clash of heads in round 5, however was still throwing. From round 9, although Gonzalez was still throwing, it was Yafai who was timing his shots, landing accurately on the body and what looked like the harder shots. After each shot landed from Yafai, Gonzalez replied with a flurry of combinations. Gonzalez eventually slowed down his output in the final two rounds as Yafai's body shots started taking its toll. Yafai stated it was not his best performance and believed the scorecards were wide, but believed he did enough to retain his belt. Gonzalez walked out of the ring after the scorecards were read.

==== Yafai vs Jimenez ====
On 29 June 2019, Yafai faced Norbelto Jimenez, then ranked #1 by the WBA at super flyweight, in his fifth consecutive title defence. Yafai managed to outbox Jimenez for most of the fight. The fight also involved both fighters landing low blows on their opponent, as well as a highly questionable knockdown in favor of Yafai in the closing round. It didn't matter much in the end, as Yafai was convincingly leading on all three scorecards, 119–107, 118-108 and 117–109, winning the bout via unanimous decision.

==== Yafai vs Gonzalez ====
On 14 January 2020, Matchroom Boxing promoter Eddie Hearn announced Yafai would next defent his WBA title against former pound-for-pound great Roman 'Chocolatito' González (48–2, 40 KOs) on 29 February at the Ford Center at The Star in Frisco, Texas. The fight was on the undercard Mikey Garcia vs. Jessie Vargas welterweight main event. González was ranked #2 by the WBA.

Both fighters stood in the pocket and were trading punches from the opening bell. Gonzalez was punishing Yafai to the body, as Yafai tried to retaliate, but with limited success. In the second half of the fight, Yafai's activity started to decrease. Gonzalez, sensing that Yafai's power was waning, became more aggressive, which resulted in a knockdown for Gonzalez in the eighth round. In the ninth round, Gonzalez caught Yafai with a big right hand and dropped him on the canvas again. The referee started the count, but quickly decided to wave the fight off, and award Gonzalez the TKO victory.

=== Retirement ===
After nearly two years without a fight, Yafai spoke in an interview where he announced his retirement. When asked if he would make a ring return, he replied, “No, I’m long gone, long gone.” He was pleased with the course of his career and accomplished everything he had hoped for. He finished his career with a world title and a record of 27 wins, with only two losses.

== Professional boxing record ==
29 fights	27 wins	2 losses
By knockout	15	2
By decision	12	0

No.	Result	Record	Opponent	Type	Round, time	Date	Location	Notes
29	Loss	27–2	Jonathan Rodriguez	KO	1 (12), 2:17	18 Nov 2023	YouTube Theater, Inglewood, California, US	
28	Win	27–1	Jerald Paclar	UD	10	5 Nov 2022	Etihad Arena, Abu Dhabi, UAE	
27	Loss	26–1	Román González	TKO	9 (12), 0:29	29 Feb 2020	Ford Center at The Star, Frisco, Texas, US	Lost WBA super-flyweight title
26	Win	26–0	Norbelto Jimenez	UD	12	29 Jun 2019	Dunkin' Donuts Center, Providence, Rhode Island, US	Retained WBA super-flyweight title
25	Win	25–0	Israel González	UD	12	24 Nov 2018	Casino de Salle Medecin, Monte Carlo, Monaco	Retained WBA super-flyweight title
24	Win	24–0	David Carmona	RTD	7 (12), 3:00	26 May 2018	Save Mart Center, Fresno, California, US	
23	Win	23–0	Sho Ishida	UD	12	28 Oct 2017	Principality Stadium, Cardiff, Wales	Retained WBA super-flyweight title
22	Win	22–0	Suguru Muranaka	UD	12	13 May 2017	Barclaycard Arena, Birmingham, England	Retained WBA super-flyweight title
21	Win	21–0	Luis Concepción	UD	12	10 Dec 2016	Manchester Arena, Manchester, England	Won vacant WBA super-flyweight title
20	Win	20–0	Johnson Tellez	TKO	3 (8), 2:48	22 Oct 2016	Barclaycard Arena, Birmingham, England	
19	Win	19–0	Jozsef Ajtai	TKO	1 (8), 1:42	25 Jun 2016	The O2 Arena, London, England	
18	Win	18–0	Dixon Flores	KO	1 (12), 1:49	5 Mar 2016	Genting Arena, Birmingham, England	Won vacant WBA Inter-Continental super-flyweight title
17	Win	17–0	Jason Cunningham	UD	12	17 Oct 2015	Barclaycard Arena, Birmingham, England	Won vacant British super-flyweight title
16	Win	16–0	Aron Juarez	KO	1 (8), 2:21	5 Sep 2015	First Direct Arena, Leeds, England	
15	Win	15–0	Isaac Quaye	TKO	1 (8), 1:22	9 May 2015	Barclaycard Arena, Birmingham, England	
14	Win	14–0	Cristofer Rosales	PTS	8	28 Mar 2015	Motorpoint Arena, Sheffield, England	
13	Win	13–0	Everth Briceno	UD	12	15 Nov 2014	3Arena, Dublin, Ireland	Retained IBF Inter-Continental super-flyweight title
12	Win	12–0	Herald Molina	KO	2 (12), 1:50	20 Sep 2014	Wembley Arena, London, England	Won vacant IBF Inter-Continental super-flyweight title
11	Win	11–0	Yaqub Kareem	KO	3 (12), 0:30	21 May 2014	First Direct Arena, Leeds, England	Won vacant Commonwealth super-flyweight title
10	Win	10–0	Ashley Lane	TKO	4 (6), 2:59	14 Dec 2013	ExCeL Arena, London, England	
9	Win	9–0	Santiago Bustos	PTS	6	26 Oct 2013	Motorpoint Arena, Sheffield, England	
8	Win	8–0	Michael Ramabeletsa	PTS	8	30 Mar 2013	Echo Arena, Liverpool, England	
7	Win	7–0	Gonzalo Garcia	RTD	4 (8), 3:00	19 Jan 2013	Civic Hall, Wolverhampton, England	
6	Win	6–0	Jorge Perez	TKO	3 (8), 2:14	8 Dec 2012	Olympia, London, England	
5	Win	5–0	Pio Antonio Nettuno	KO	1 (8), 0:52	17 Nov 2012	Capital FM Arena, Nottingham, England	
4	Win	4–0	Scott Gladwin	TKO	2 (6), 1:05	20 Oct 2012	Motorpoint Arena, Sheffield, England	
3	Win	3–0	Victor Koh	PTS	6	22 Sep 2012	Odyssey Arena, Belfast, Northern Ireland	
2	Win	2–0	Richard Voros	TKO	1 (4), 1:08	8 Sep 2012	Alexandra Palace, London, England	
1	Win	1–0	Delroy Spencer	RTD	2 (4), 3:00	7 Jul 2012	Motorpoint Arena, Sheffield, England	

== See also ==
- List of world super-flyweight boxing champions
- List of British world boxing champions

Sporting positions
Amateur boxing titles
Previous: Darran Langley	ABA Light-Flyweight champion 2007	Next: Tommy Stubbs
Regional boxing titles
Vacant Title last held by Paul Butler	Commonwealth super-flyweight champion 21 May 2014 – December 2014; Vacated	Vacant Title next held by Anthony Nelson
Vacant Title last held by Z Gorres	IBF; Inter-Continental super-flyweight champion 20 September 2014 – February 2015; Vacated	Vacant Title next held by Makazole Tete
Vacant Title last held by Paul Butler	British super-flyweight champion 17 October 2015 – 10 December 2016; Won WBA title	Vacant Title next held by Charlie Edwards
Vacant Title last held by Paul Butler	WBA; Inter-Continental super-flyweight champion 5 March 2016 – 10 December 2016; Won world title	Vacant Title next held by Ulises Lara
World boxing titles
Vacant Title last held by Luis Concepción	WBA super flyweight champion 10 December 2016 – 29 February 2020	Succeeded by Román González
