= Kid Galahad (boxer) =

British boxer (born 1990)

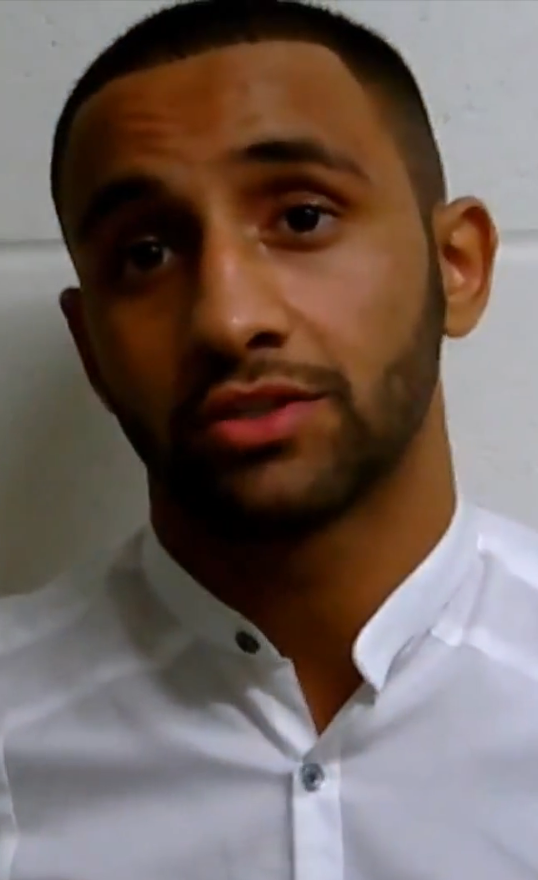
- Galahad in 2014

Personal information
- Nationality: British
- Born: Abdul-Bari Awad; 3 March 1990 (age 36) Doha, Qatar
- Height: 5 ft 6 1/2 in (169 cm)
- Weight: Super-bantamweight; Featherweight; Lightweight

Boxing career
- Reach: 66 1/2 in (169 cm)
- Stance: Orthodox

Boxing record
- Total fights: 31
- Wins: 28
- Win by KO: 17
- Losses: 3

Abdul-Bari "Baz" Awad (born 3 March 1990), best known by his nickname of "Kid Galahad", is a British professional boxer who held the IBF featherweight title.

== Early life ==
Galahad was born in the Qatar capital of Doha but is originally from Yemen. His father was in the Qatar Armed Forces and was released as part of an agreement with the Americans after the conclusion of the Gulf War. At the age of four, Galahad came to England with his parents and lived in Liverpool until he was 12 years old and eventually ended up in Sheffield. At the age of 13 he took up boxing with trainer Brendan Ingle.

== Professional career ==
Galahad decided to take up boxing to keep him off the streets so he didn't follow his siblings and end up in jail and being involved in gang violence. After he started going to his local gym to get bigger he noticed a boxing ring, after shadow boxing for a few minutes he decided he wanted to be a boxer. After a chance meeting with his hero Prince Naseem Hamed he was told by Naseem that if he wanted to be great in boxing and wanted to be a champion he should train at the Brendan Ingle gym, so after driving around for an hour Galahad and his mother found the gym.

=== Galahad vs. Spencer ===
Galahad made his professional debut on 5 September 2009 at the Colosseum in Watford England in which he defeated Delroy Spencer on Points.

=== Galahad vs. Senkovs ===
Galahad's Second Professional fight took place on 3 October 2009 at the Leisure Centre in Altrincham England where he defeated Pavels Senkovs on Points after 4 rounds.

=== Galahad vs. Curran ===
He then scored his first stoppage Victory on 21 May 2010 defeating Dougie Curran by TKO in the second round.

=== Galahad vs. Booth ===
Galahad racked up a record of 10–0 before defeating Jason Booth by Unanimous Decision on 18 February 2012 to earn his first title the WBC International super-bantamweight championship

=== Galahad vs. Wale ===
Galahad defended his championship once against Josh Wale by TKO afterwards he vacated the title.

Galahad scored two more wins, defeating Ivan Ruiz Morote and Isaac Nettey both by TKO to earn a shot at the BBBofC British title which he won by defeating James Dickens by TKO, he would later vacate the title.

=== Galahad vs. Prado ===
On 22 March 2014, Galahad won the European super-bantamweight championship with a unanimous twelve round decision over Sergio Prado.

=== Galahad vs. Mundraby ===
On 10 May 2014, Galahad won the vacant Commonwealth super-bantamweight championship by beating Fred Mundraby by corner retirement after round 4.

=== Galahad vs. Dos Santos ===
Galahad faced Adeilson Dos Santos on 20 September 2014 at the Ponds Forge Arena for the vacant IBF World Youth super-bantamweight championship. Gallahad controlled the fight, out boxing Dos Santos with fast jabs, hooks and combinations sending Dos Santos to the canvas in the first round and tenth round. Gallahad won the fight by unanimous decision.

In October 2014 Galahad vacated the European title to pursue a world title.

=== Doping ban ===
In May 2015, Galahad was banned for 2 years following a failed drugs test. He tested positive for banned substance stanozolol, an anabolic steroid. He maintains his innocence saying his brother put the steroids in his protein shake after Galahad refused to give him money, and appealed against a ban, but it was rejected by UKAD and the ban upheld, backdated to run from 20 September 2014.

=== Galahad vs. Volosinas ===
Galahad made his return to boxing on 30 April 2016 with a 4th round TKO win over Simas Volosinas at the DW Stadium in Wigan, England. This was Galahad’s first non championship fight since 2013.

Galahad won his first title since his return on 15 July 2017 winning the vacant IBF Inter-Continental featherweight title.

=== Galahad vs. Warrington ===
On Saturday 15 June 2019 Galahad narrowly lost a split decision to Josh Warrington fighting for the IBF featherweight Title in what many commentators saw as a difficult contest to score. Judge Howard Foster's card was 115-113 in favour of Galahad, Steve Gray was 116-112 for Warrington and Michael Alexander was 116-113 for Warrington. Writing in The Observer, Tom Seymour noted that "the fight was perilously close ... Kid Galahad has a right to feel he was robbed of the chance to be the IBF's undisputed champion".

=== Galahad vs. Marrero ===
Galahad beat Claudio Marrero by technical knockout in the 8th round on 8 February 2020 at Sheffield Arena in Sheffield.

=== Galahad vs. Dickens ===
On 7 August 2021, Galahad successfully captured his first world title, the vacant IBF featherweight title against Jazza Dickens. Dickens was ranked #3 by the IBF at featherweight at the time. The fight was stopped at the end of the 11th round when Dickens' corner refused to continue due to the punishment that he was taking.

=== Galahad vs. Martinez ===
On 13 November 2021, Galahad lost his world title in his first defence against Kiko Martinez, who was ranked #15 by the IBF at featherweight. Galahad looked comfortable through the first 5 rounds before being floored in the last 30 seconds of round 5. Galahad was again floored with the first punch of the 6th round and the referee stopped the fight.

=== Galahad vs Hughes ===
On 24 September 2022, Galahad fought Maxi Hughes for the IBO lightweight title in Nottingham. Hughes won by majority decision on 116-111, 114-113, and 114-114 cards. Galahad had a point deducted for a headbutt in the 10th round. Without this penalty, the fight would have ended in a draw. The fight was close throughout, with neither fighter asserting dominance. The Ring magazine described it as "scrappy", and a "rough and frustrating fight".

== Professional boxing record ==
| 31 fights | 28 wins | 3 losses |
|---|---|---|
| By knockout | 17 | 1 |
| By decision | 11 | 2 |

| No. | Result | Record | Opponent | Type | Round, time | Date | Location | Notes |
|---|---|---|---|---|---|---|---|---|
| 31 | Loss | 28–3 | Maxi Hughes | MD | 12 | 24 Sep 2022 | Motorpoint Arena, Nottingham, England | For IBO lightweight title |
| 30 | Loss | 28–2 | Kiko Martínez | KO | 6 (12), 0:06 | 13 Nov 2021 | Utilta Arena, Sheffield, England | Lost IBF featherweight title |
| 29 | Win | 28–1 | Jazza Dickens | RTD | 11 (12), 3:00 | 7 Aug 2021 | Matchroom Headquarters, Brentwood, England | Won vacant IBF featherweight title |
| 28 | Win | 27–1 | Claudio Marrero | RTD | 8 (12), 3:00 | 8 Feb 2020 | FlyDSA Arena, Sheffield, England | |
| 27 | Loss | 26–1 | Josh Warrington | SD | 12 | 15 Jun 2019 | First Direct Arena, Leeds, England | For IBF featherweight title |
| 26 | Win | 26–0 | Brayan Mairena | PTS | 8 | 8 Dec 2018 | FlyDSA Arena, Sheffield, England | |
| 25 | Win | 25–0 | Toka Kahn Clary | UD | 12 | 20 Oct 2018 | TD Garden, Boston, Massachusetts, US | |
| 24 | Win | 24–0 | Irving Berry | KO | 3 (12), 2:20 | 3 Mar 2018 | FlyDSA Arena, Sheffield, England | |
| 23 | Win | 23–0 | Jose Cayetano | TKO | 10 (12), 2:14 | 15 Jul 2017 | The SSE Arena Wembley, London, England | Won vacant IBF Inter-Continental featherweight title |
| 22 | Win | 22–0 | Leonel Hernandez | RTD | 3 (8), 3:00 | 4 Feb 2017 | London Olympia, London, England | |
| 21 | Win | 21–0 | Reynaldo Mora | TKO | 3 (8), 2:21 | 26 Nov 2016 | Motorpoint Arena, Cardiff, Wales | |
| 20 | Win | 20–0 | Emiliano Salvini | TKO | 4 (8), 0:38 | 10 Sep 2016 | The O2 Arena, London, England | |
| 19 | Win | 19–0 | Simas Volosinas | TKO | 4 (6), 2:06 | 30 Apr 2016 | DW Stadium, Wigan, England | |
| 18 | Win | 18–0 | Adeilson Dos Santos | UD | 12 | 20 Sep 2014 | Ponds Forge, Sheffield, England | Won vacant IBF Youth super-bantamweight title |
| 17 | Win | 17–0 | Fred Mundraby | RTD | 4 (12), 3:00 | 10 May 2014 | Ponds Forge, Sheffield, England | Won vacant Commonwealth super-bantamweight title |
| 16 | Win | 16–0 | Sergio Prado | UD | 12 | 22 Mar 2014 | Ponds Forge, Sheffield, England | Won vacant European super-bantamweight title |
| 15 | Win | 15–0 | Jazza Dickens | TKO | 10 (12), 1:34 | 14 Sep 2013 | Magna Science Adventure Centre, Rotherham, England | Won vacant British super-bantamweight title |
| 14 | Win | 14–0 | Isaac Nettey | TKO | 5 (8), 2:35 | 8 Jun 2013 | Bluewater, Stone, England | |
| 13 | Win | 13–0 | Ivan Ruiz Morote | TKO | 4 (8), 2:50 | 8 Dec 2012 | Sports Arena, Hull, England | |
| 12 | Win | 12–0 | Josh Wale | TKO | 9 (12), 3:00 | 12 May 2012 | Hillsborough Leisure Centre, Sheffield, England | Retained WBC International super-bantamweight title |
| 11 | Win | 11–0 | Jason Booth | UD | 12 | 18 Feb 2012 | Magna Science Adventure Centre, Rotherham, England | Won vacant WBC International super-bantamweight title |
| 10 | Win | 10–0 | James Ancliff | TKO | 4 (6), 2:58 | 8 Oct 2011 | Ponds Forge, Sheffield, England | |
| 9 | Win | 9–0 | Paul Griffin | TKO | 1 (8), 1:31 | 17 Sep 2011 | Kings Hall, Belfast, Northern Ireland | |
| 8 | Win | 8–0 | Pavels Senkovs | PTS | 6 | 23 Jul 2011 | Wembley Arena, London, England | |
| 7 | Win | 7–0 | Sid Razak | PTS | 4 | 30 Apr 2011 | Don Valley Stadium, Sheffield, England | |
| 6 | Win | 6–0 | Dai Davies | PTS | 4 | 16 Apr 2011 | MEN Arena, Manchester, England | |
| 5 | Win | 5–0 | John Riley | KO | 1 (4), 2:53 | 26 Nov 2010 | Reebok Stadium, Bolton, England | |
| 4 | Win | 4–0 | Ian Bailey | PTS | 6 | 25 Sep 2010 | Robin Park Arena, Wigan, England | |
| 3 | Win | 3–0 | Dougie Curran | TKO | 2 (4), 2:53 | 21 May 2010 | Ponds Forge, Sheffield, England | |
| 2 | Win | 2–0 | Pavels Senkovs | PTS | 4 | 3 Oct 2009 | Leisure Centre, Altrincham, England | |
| 1 | Win | 1–0 | Delroy Spencer | PTS | 4 | 5 Sep 2009 | Colosseum, Watford, England | |

Sporting positions
Regional boxing titles
| Vacant Title last held by Simpiwe Vetyeka | WBC International super-bantamweight champion 18 February 2012 – December 2012; Vacated | Vacant Title next held by Alexis Boureima Kabore |
| Vacant Title last held by Scott Quigg | British super-bantamweight champion 14 September 2013 – February 2014; Vacated | Vacant Title next held by Gavin McDonnell |
| Vacant Title last held by Carl Frampton | European super-bantamweight champion 22 March 2014 – May 2014; Vacated | Vacant Title next held by Gavin McDonnell |
| Vacant Title last held by Carl Frampton | Commonwealth super-bantamweight champion 10 May 2014 – September 2015; Vacated | Vacant Title next held by Bobby Jenkinson |
| Vacant Title last held by Rey Vargas | IBF Youth super-bantamweight champion 20 September 2014 – September 2016; Vacated | Vacant Title next held by Sinethemba Bam |
| Vacant Title last held by Viorel Simion | IBF Inter-Continental featherweight champion 15 July 2017 – January 2019; Vacated | Vacant Title next held by Shakur Stevenson |
World boxing titles
| Vacant Title last held by Josh Warrington | IBF featherweight champion 7 August 2021 – 13 November 2021 | Succeeded by Kiko Martínez |
