= Suguru Muranaka =

Japanese boxer (born 1985)

Personal information
- Nationality: Japanese
- Born: 12 June 1985 (age 41) Kagoshima, Japan
- Height: 5 ft 4 in (163 cm)
- Weight: Super-flyweight

Boxing career
- Stance: Orthodox

Boxing record
- Total fights: 30
- Wins: 26
- Win by KO: 8
- Losses: 3
- Draws: 1

Suguru Muranaka (村中 優, Muranaka Suguru; born 12 June 1985) is a Japanese professional boxer.

== Professional boxing record ==
29 fights	26 wins	2 losses
By knockout	8	0
By decision	18	2
Draws	1	

No.	Result	Record	Opponent	Type	Round, time	Date	Location	Notes
30	Win	26–3–1	(Japan) Ken Achiwa	UD	8	Dec 6, 2017	Korakuen Hall, Tokyo, Japan	
29	Loss	25–3–1	(United Kingdom) Kal Yafai	UD	12	May 13, 2017	(United Kingdom) Barclaycard Arena, Birmingham, England, UK	For WBA super-flyweight title
28	Win	25–2–1	(Japan) Hiroyuki Hisataka	PTS	8	Dec 5, 2016	Korakuen Hall, Tokyo, Japan	
27	Win	24–2–1	(Philippines) Renoel Pael	PTS	8	Jul 8, 2016	Korakuen Hall, Tokyo, Japan	
26	Win	23–2–1	(Japan) Shun Ishibashi	TKO	6 (10), 1:23	Apr 12, 2016	Korakuen Hall, Tokyo, Japan	
25	Win	22–2–1	(Japan) Tetsuma Hayashi	PTS	10	Apr 8, 2015	Korakuen Hall, Tokyo, Japan	
24	Win	21–2–1	(Japan) Yusuke Sakashita	TKO	8 (10), 2:42	Oct 4, 2014	Korakuen Hall, Tokyo, Japan	Retained Japanese flyweight title
23	Win	20–2–1	(Japan) Masayuki Kuroda	TKO	10 (10), 1:32	Apr 10, 2014	Korakuen Hall, Tokyo, Japan	Retained Japanese flyweight title
22	Win	19–2–1	(Japan) Takuya Kogawa	PTS	10	Dec 10, 2013	Korakuen Hall, Tokyo, Japan	Won Japanese flyweight title
21	Win	18–2–1	(Japan) Ken Achiwa	PTS	8	Mar 21, 2013	Korakuen Hall, Tokyo, Japan	
20	Win	17–2–1	(Japan) Ganbare Shota	TKO	7 (10), 1:16	Oct 6, 2012	Korakuen Hall, Tokyo, Japan	
19	Win	16–2–1	(Japan) Hyobu Nakagama	PTS	8	Mar 22, 2012	Korakuen Hall, Tokyo, Japan	
18	Win	15–2–1	(Japan) Hiroki Saito	PTS	8	Aug 27, 2011	Korakuen Hall, Tokyo, Japan	
17	Win	14–2–1	(Philippines) Along Denoy	PTS	8	Apr 11, 2011	Korakuen Hall, Tokyo, Japan	
16	Win	13–2–1	(Japan) Koji Itagaki	PTS	8	Oct 11, 2010	Korakuen Hall, Tokyo, Japan	
15	Win	12–2–1	(Japan) Yuki Nasu	TKO	6 (8), 0:57	Jul 14, 2010	Korakuen Hall, Tokyo, Japan	
14	Draw	11–2–1	(Japan) Katsumi Makiyama	TD	2 (6), 2:17	Jul 2, 2008	Korakuen Hall, Tokyo, Japan	
13	Win	11–2	(Japan) Masafumi Otake	PTS	8	Mar 6, 2008	Korakuen Hall, Tokyo, Japan	
12	Win	10–2	(Japan) Nobuki Tateyama	PTS	6	Oct 30, 2007	Korakuen Hall, Tokyo, Japan	
11	Win	9–2	(Japan) Kazuyuki Kato	TKO	3 (5), 1:54	Aug 7, 2007	Korakuen Hall, Tokyo, Japan	
10	Win	8–2	(Japan) Shinya Fukunaga	PTS	6	Apr 4, 2007	Korakuen Hall, Tokyo, Japan	
9	Loss	7–2	(Japan) Tomoya Kaneshiro	PTS	6	Nov 3, 2006	Korakuen Hall, Tokyo, Japan	
8	Win	7–1	(Japan) Toyoto Shiraishi	PTS	4	Sep 29, 2006	Korakuen Hall, Tokyo, Japan	
7	Win	6–1	(Japan) Kosuke Miyakozawa	PTS	4	Aug 16, 2006	Korakuen Hall, Tokyo, Japan	
6	Win	5–1	(Japan) Tetsuo Okubo	TKO	3 (4), 2:46	Jun 29, 2006	Korakuen Hall, Tokyo, Japan	
5	Win	4–1	(Japan) Takao Aoki	PTS	4	Nov 16, 2005	Korakuen Hall, Tokyo, Japan	
4	Loss	3–1	(Japan) Shigeo Saito	PTS	4	Aug 18, 2005	Korakuen Hall, Tokyo, Japan	
3	Win	3–0	(Japan) Kiyoshi Izawa	PTS	4	May 9, 2005	Korakuen Hall, Tokyo, Japan	
2	Win	2–0	(Japan) Hayabusa Uhara	PTS	4	Mar 29, 2005	Korakuen Hall, Tokyo, Japan	
1	Win	1–0	(Japan) Masashi Muto	TKO	4 (4), 1:05	Nov 9, 2004	Korakuen Hall, Tokyo, Japan	Professional debut
