= Jazza Dickens =

British boxer (born 1991)

James Dickens
Personal information
- Nickname: Jazza
- Born: 12 April 1991 (age 35) Liverpool, England
- Height: 5 ft 5 in (165 cm)
- Weight: Super bantamweight; Featherweight; Super featherweight

Boxing career
- Reach: 63 in (160 cm)
- Stance: Southpaw

Boxing record
- Total fights: 43
- Wins: 37
- Win by KO: 15
- Losses: 6

James "Jazza" Dickens (born 12 April 1991) is a British professional boxer. He held the World Boxing Association (WBA) super-featherweight title from 2025 to 2026, the International Boxing Organization (IBO) featherweight title between 2022 and 2023, and the British super-bantamweight title between 2015 and 2017.

== Career ==
Born in Mill Lane Hospital, Liverpool, Dickens took up boxing at the age of 12 at the Salisbury ABC; After two years he moved on to the Golden Gloves ABC before moving on again to the Everton Red Triangle Boxing Club, representing his country many times at junior level. He won the senior ABA bantamweight title in 2010.

After missing out on selection for the Commonwealth Games, he turned professional, making his pro debut in January 2011. He won his first thirteen fights, including victories over Yuriy Voronin and Franklin Varela, before facing the also unbeaten Jon Fernandes in March 2013 for the vacant English super-bantamweight title at the Echo Arena, Liverpool. Dickens took a unanimous decision to become English champion.

Dickens won his next two fights against Dai Davies and Reynaldo Cajina, before meeting Kid Galahad for the vacant British super-bantamweight title in September 2013. Galahad stopped Dickens in the 10th round, inflicting the first defeat of his professional career.

Dickens won his next two fights before getting a second chance at the British title after Gavin McDonnell vacated it. He faced Josh Wale at the Echo Arena in March 2015, this time winning via unanimous decision to add the British title to his English title.

On 16 July 2016, Dickens challenged Guillermo Rigondeaux for the WBA (Super) super-bantamweight title. Dickens' corner pulled him out of the fight after round two, after it was discovered that a big left hand by Rigonedaux had fractured Dickens' jaw.

In his next fight, Dickens fought Thomas Patrick Ward in a bid to defend his British super-bantamweight title. Despite Ward's strong start, Dickens seemed to be the one racking up the points in the early rounds. This would be the case, until a sudden turn in the fight in which Ward started to punish Dickens. In the ninth round, Ward was pushed to the canvas, which opened up a cut above his left eye, leading the referee to stop the fight on the advice of the ringside doctor. At the time of stoppage the scorecards were 85–87, 84–88, and 85–87 in favor of the challenger. Ward won the fight by technical decision.

=== Golden Contract tournament ===
In the semi-finals, Dickens battled fellow Briton Leigh Wood. Early in the fight, Dickens had swelling over his left eye, but managed to put on a very good performance throughout the fight. Dickens, who was ranked #3 at featherweight by the IBF at the time, managed to snatch a majority decision victory.

On 15 February 2025 at the Co-op Live Arena in Manchester, Dickens defeated Zelfa Barrett by unanimous decision.

Dickens challenged IBA and WBA (Interim) super-featherweight champion Albert Batyrgaziev at Rixos Tersane in Istanbul, Turkey, on 2 July 2025, winning the fight by stoppage in the fourth round.

=== WBA super-featherweight champion ===
Dickens was elevated to full WBA super-featherweight champion on 6 December 2025 after Lamont Roach Jr. was stripped of the title. Dickens was due to make the first defence of his title against Hayato Tsutsumi (8–0, 5 KOs) on 27 December 2025 in Riyadh, Saudi Arabia, as part of The Ring V: Night of the Samurai card. However, the fight was cancelled after Tsutsumi sustained an injury during training.

Dickens made the first defense of his title against Anthony Cacace at 3Arena in Dublin on 14 March 2026. He lost by unanimous decision.

Having got back to winning ways with an eight-round unanimous decision success over Ramadhani Kimwaga in Dubai on 19 September 2026, Dickens is scheduled to challenge interim WBC super-featherweight champion Ryan Garner at Bournemouth International Centre on 9 January 2027.

== Professional boxing record ==
43 fights	37 wins	6 losses
By knockout	15	4
By decision	22	2

No.	Result	Record	Opponent	Type	Round, time	Date	Location	Notes
43	Win	37–6	Ramadhani Kimwaga	UD	8	19 Sep 2026	Meydan Hotel, Dubai	
42	Loss	36–6	Anthony Cacace	UD	12	14 Mar 2026	3Arena, Dublin, Ireland	Lost WBA super-featherweight title
41	Win	36–5	Albert Batyrgaziev	KO	4 (12), 2:29	2 Jul 2025	Rixos Tersane, Istanbul, Turkey	Won IBA and WBA interim super-featherweight titles
40	Win	35–5	Zelfa Barrett	UD	10	15 Feb 2025	Co-op Live Arena, Manchester, England	
39	Win	34–5	Eduardo Mancito	TKO	7 (8), 0:19	29 Jun 2024	Hilton Al Habtoor City, Dubai	
38	Win	33–5	Jayro Fernando Duran	TKO	6 (6), 1:27	6 Sep 2024	Olympia, Liverpool, England	
37	Loss	32–5	Hector Andres Sosa	KO	10 (12), 0:56	22 Jul 2023	Dubai Studio City, Dubai, United Arab Emirates	Lost IBO featherweight title
36	Win	32–4	Lerato Dlamini	UD	12	15 Oct 2022	Olympia, Liverpool, England	Won vacant IBO featherweight title
35	Win	31–4	Andoni Gago	KO	5 (10), 2:52	22 Apr 2022	Echo Arena, Liverpool, England	
34	Loss	30–4	Kid Galahad	RTD	11 (12), 3:00	7 Aug 2021	Matchroom Headquarters, Brentwood, England	For vacant IBF featherweight title
33	Win	30–3	Ryan Walsh	UD	10	2 Dec 2020	Production Park Studios, South Kirkby, England	Retained WBO European featherweight title; The Golden Contract: Featherweight – final
32	Win	29–3	Leigh Wood	MD	10	21 Feb 2020	York Hall, London, England	Won WBO European featherweight title; The Golden Contract: Featherweight – semi-final
31	Win	28–3	Carlos Ramos	UD	10	4 Oct 2019	York Hall, London, England	Retained IBF European featherweight title; The Golden Contract: Featherweight – quarter-final
30	Win	27–3	Nathaniel May	UD	10	12 Jul 2019	Liverpool Olympia, Liverpool, England	Won vacant IBF European featherweight title
29	Win	26–3	Nasibu Ramadhani	TKO	5 (10), 0:58	19 Apr 2019	Liverpool Olympia, Liverpool, England	
28	Win	25–3	Miguel Encarnacion	TKO	1 (8), 2:47	9 Nov 2018	Casa de los Clubes, Santo Domingo, Dominican Republic	
27	Win	24–3	Pablo Narvaez	KO	1 (6), 2:28	27 Jul 2018	De Vere Whites Hotel, Bolton, England	
26	Win	23–3	Barnie Arguelles	TKO	5 (6)	2 Mar 2018	Bowlers Exhibition Centre, Manchester, England	
25	Loss	22–3	Thomas Patrick Ward	TD	9 (12), 1:12	13 May 2017	First Direct Arena, Leeds, England	Lost British super bantamweight title; Unanimous TD after Ward cut from accidental head clash
24	Loss	22–2	Guillermo Rigondeaux	RTD	2 (12), 3:00	16 Jul 2016	Ice Arena Wales, Cardiff, Wales	For WBA (Super) super-bantamweight title
23	Win	22–1	Reynaldo Cajina	RTD	7 (8), 3:00	12 Mar 2016	Echo Arena, Liverpool, England	
22	Win	21–1	Martin Ward	SD	12	20 Nov 2015	Rainton Meadows Arena, Houghton-le-Spring, England	Retained British super-bantamweight title
21	Win	20–1	Arnoldo Solano	PTS	6	25 Jul 2015	Sports Village, Ellesmere Port, England	
20	Win	19–1	Josh Wale	UD	12	6 Mar 2015	Echo Arena, Liverpool, England	Won vacant British super-bantamweight title
19	Win	18–1	Giorgi Gachechiladze	TKO	2 (8), 2:00	25 Oct 2014	Echo Arena, Liverpool, England	
18	Win	17–1	Krzysztof Rogowski	PTS	6	8 Mar 2014	Aintree Equestrian Centre, Liverpool, England	
17	Loss	16–1	Kid Galahad	TKO	10 (12), 1:34	14 Sep 2013	Magna Centre, Rotherham, England	For vacant British super-bantamweight title
16	Win	16–0	Reynaldo Cajina	PTS	4	6 Jul 2013	Echo Arena, Liverpool, England	
15	Win	15–0	Dai Davies	PTS	10	24 May 2013	Liverpool Olympia, Liverpool, England	
14	Win	14–0	Jon Fernandes	UD	10	30 Mar 2013	Echo Arena, Liverpool, England	Won vacant English super-bantamweight title
13	Win	13–0	Franklin Varela	PTS	8	24 Nov 2012	Manchester Arena, Manchester, England	
12	Win	12–0	Michael Isaac Carrero	TKO	6 (8), 2:36	5 Oct 2012	Winter Gardens, Blackpool, England	
11	Win	11–0	Kristian Laight	PTS	6	29 Jul 2012	Devonshire House Hotel, Liverpool, England	
10	Win	10–0	Yuriy Voronin	TKO	4 (6), 0:54	21 Apr 2012	Sports Centre, Oldham, England	
9	Win	9–0	Janis Puksins	TKO	3 (6), 1:28	10 Mar 2012	Liverpool Olympia, Liverpool, England	
8	Win	8–0	Barrington Brown	PTS	6	4 Feb 2012	De Vere Whites Hotel, Bolton, England	
7	Win	7–0	Dougie Curran	PTS	4	16 Dec 2011	Municipal Hall, Colne, England	
6	Win	6–0	James Ancliff	RTD	2 (6), 3:00	12 Nov 2011	Sports Centre, Oldham, England	
5	Win	5–0	Chris Riley	PTS	4	30 Sep 2011	Liverpool Olympia, Liverpool, England	
4	Win	4–0	Chuck Jones	PTS	4	30 Jul 2011	Greenbank Sports Centre, Liverpool, England	
3	Win	3–0	Stoyan Serbezov	PTS	4	20 May 2011	Deeside Leisure Centre, Queensferry, England	
2	Win	2–0	Sali Mustafov	TKO	1 (4), 1:23	26 Mar 2011	Robin Park Centre, Wigan, England	
1	Win	1–0	Pavels Senkovs	PTS	4	22 Jan 2011	Liverpool Olympia, Liverpool, England	

== See also ==
- List of male boxers
- List of southpaw stance boxers
- List of British world boxing champions
- List of world super-featherweight boxing champions

Sporting positions
Regional boxing titles
Vacant Title last held by Ryan Walsh	English super-bantamweight champion 30 March 2013 – July 2013; Vacated	Vacant Title next held by Sean Davis
Vacant Title last held by Gavin McDonnell	British super-bantamweight champion 6 March 2015 – 13 May 2017	Succeeded by Thomas Patrick Ward
New title	IBF European featherweight champion 12 July 2019 – 17 August 2021; Lost bid for world title	Vacant
Preceded by Leigh Wood	WBO European featherweight champion 21 February 2020 – 2021; Vacated	Vacant Title next held by Albert Batyrgaziev
Minor world boxing titles
Vacant Title last held by Tugstsogt Nyambayar	IBO featherweight champion 15 October 2022 – 22 July 2023	Succeeded by Hector Andres Sosa
Preceded by Albert Batyrgaziev	IBA super-featherweight champion 2 July 2025 – present	Incumbent
Major world boxing titles
Preceded by Albert Batyrgaziev	WBA super-featherweight champion Interim title 2 July – 6 December 2025; Promoted	Vacant
Preceded by Lamont Roach Jr. Stripped	WBA super-featherweight champion 6 December 2025 – 14 March 2026	Succeeded by Anthony Cacace
