= Gavin McDonnell =

British boxer

Personal information
- Nationality: British
- Born: 30 March 1986 (age 40) Hatfield, Doncaster, South Yorkshire, England
- Weight: Super-bantamweight

Boxing career
- Stance: Orthodox

Boxing record
- Total fights: 27
- Wins: 22
- Win by KO: 6
- Losses: 2
- Draws: 3

Gavin McDonnell (born 30 March 1986) is a British professional boxer who has challenged twice for a world super-bantamweight title: the WBC title in 2017, and the WBA title in 2018. He is the twin brother of fellow boxer Jamie McDonnell.

== Professional career ==
McDonnell fought Leigh Wood for the vacant British Super-Bantamweight title in Hull on 22 February 2014. McDonnell won the vacant title by TKO in the 6th round. McDonnell's first defense of the British Super-Bantamweight title would come against Josh Wale on 21 May 2014. The contest went the distance of 12 rounds and ended in a split draw, with the judges scoring the contest 115–114 Wale, 115–114 McDonnell and the final judge scoring the bout at 114–114, meaning McDonnell would hold on to the belt.

His next fight came in the form of Vusi Malinga on 25 October 2014 in a contest for the vacant WBO International Super-Bantamweight title. McDonnell dominated the fight from start to finish and also sent Malinga down in the 8th round with a beautiful right hand. The contest went the distance with McDonnell winning by Unanimous Decision. After the win McDonnell was projected to 4th in the British Rankings for the Super-Bantamweight division.

On 16 June 2018, McDonnell outpointed Stuart Hall, 117–111, 117-111 and 115–113 to a unanimous decision victory and successfully defended his WBC regional title.

On 6 October 2018, McDonnell fought Daniel Roman for the WBA super-bantamweight world title. Roman was winning the fight, ultimately dropping McDonnell in the tenth. McDonnell managed to beat the count, but the referee decided to stop the fight.

== Professional boxing record ==
| 27 fights | 22 wins | 2 losses |
|---|---|---|
| By knockout | 6 | 1 |
| By decision | 16 | 1 |
| Draws | 3 | |

| No. | Result | Record | Opponent | Type | Round, time | Date | Location | Notes |
|---|---|---|---|---|---|---|---|---|
| 27 | Draw | 22–2–3 | (Spain) Andoni Gago | TD | 5 (12), 2:34 | 26 Mar 2021 | Pabellón de la Vall d'Hebron, Barcelona, Spain | For European featherweight title; Majority TD after McDonnell cut from accidental head clash |
| 26 | Win | 22–2–2 | (United Kingdom) Nathan Kirk | TKO | 7 (8), 1:28 | 4 Oct 2019 | (United Kingdom) Doncaster Dome, Doncaster, England | |
| 25 | Win | 21–2–2 | (United Kingdom) Jamie Speight | PTS | 6 | 19 Jul 2019 | (United Kingdom) Magna Centre, Rotherham, England | |
| 24 | Loss | 20–2–2 | (United States) Daniel Roman | TKO | 10 (12), 2:36 | 6 Oct 2018 | (United States) Wintrust Arena, Chicago, Illinois, US | For WBA super-bantamweight title |
| 23 | Win | 20–1–2 | (United Kingdom) Stuart Hall | UD | 12 | 16 Jun 2018 | (United Kingdom) Metro Radio Arena, Newcastle, England | Retained WBC International super-bantamweight title |
| 22 | Win | 19–1–2 | (United Kingdom) Gamal Yafai | UD | 12 | 3 Mar 2018 | (United Kingdom) FlyDSA Arena, Sheffield, England | Won WBC International super-bantamweight title |
| 21 | Win | 18–1–2 | (Hungary) Jozsef Ajtai | TKO | 1 (6), 2:04 | 7 Oct 2017 | (United Kingdom) Manchester Arena, Manchester, England | |
| 20 | Win | 17–1–2 | (Lithuania) Simas Volosinas | PTS | 6 | 1 Jul 2017 | (United Kingdom) Doncaster Dome, Doncaster, England | |
| 19 | Loss | 16–1–2 | (Mexico) Rey Vargas | MD | 12 | 25 Feb 2017 | (United Kingdom) Ice Arena, Hull, England | For vacant WBC super-bantamweight title |
| 18 | Win | 16–0–2 | (Nicaragua) Robin Zamora | PTS | 8 | 10 Sep 2016 | (United Kingdom) The O2 Arena, London, England | |
| 17 | Win | 15–0–2 | (Panama) Jorge Sanchez | UD | 12 | 27 Feb 2016 | (United Kingdom) Manchester Arena, Manchester, England | Won vacant WBC Silver super-bantamweight title |
| 16 | Win | 14–0–2 | (France) Jeromy Parodi | UD | 12 | 24 Oct 2015 | (United Kingdom) Sheffield Arena, Sheffield, England | Retained European super-bantamweight title |
| 15 | Win | 13–0–2 | (Ukraine) Alexander Egorov | UD | 12 | 28 Mar 2015 | (United Kingdom) Sheffield Arena, Sheffield, England | Won vacant European super-bantamweight title |
| 14 | Win | 12–0–2 | (South Africa) Vusi Malinga | UD | 12 | 25 Oct 2014 | (United Kingdom) Ice Arena, Hull, England | Won vacant WBO Inter-Continental super-bantamweight title |
| 13 | Draw | 11–0–2 | (United Kingdom) Josh Wale | SD | 12 | 21 May 2014 | (United Kingdom) First Direct Arena, Leeds, England | Retained British super-bantamweight title |
| 12 | Win | 11–0–1 | (United Kingdom) Leigh Wood | TKO | 6 (12), 2:03 | 22 Feb 2014 | (United Kingdom) Ice Arena, Hull, England | Won vacant British super-bantamweight title |
| 11 | Win | 10–0–1 | (United Kingdom) Josh Wale | UD | 12 | 28 Sep 2013 | (United Kingdom) Doncaster Dome, Doncaster, England | |
| 10 | Win | 9–0–1 | (United Kingdom) Ross Burkinshaw | TKO | 2 (10), 3:00 | 6 Jul 2013 | (United Kingdom) Doncaster Dome, Doncaster, England | Retained BBBofC Central Area super-bantamweight title |
| 9 | Win | 8–0–1 | (United Kingdom) Paul Economides | UD | 10 | 19 Apr 2013 | (United Kingdom) Doncaster Dome, Doncaster, England | |
| 8 | Win | 7–0–1 | (United Kingdom) Dean Anderson | RTD | 8 (10), 3:00 | 1 Dec 2012 | (United Kingdom) Doncaster Dome, Doncaster, England | |
| 7 | Win | 6–0–1 | (United Kingdom) Scott Gladwin | TKO | 6 (10), 2:46 | 1 Sep 2012 | (United Kingdom) Doncaster Dome, Doncaster, England | Won vacant BBBofC Central Area super-bantamweight title |
| 6 | Win | 5–0–1 | (Slovakia) Elemir Rafael | PTS | 4 | 8 Jun 2012 | (United Kingdom) Doncaster Dome, Doncaster, England | |
| 5 | Draw | 4–0–1 | (United Kingdom) Ashley Lane | PTS | 4 | 2 Mar 2012 | (United Kingdom) Doncaster Dome, Doncaster, England | |
| 4 | Win | 4–0 | (United Kingdom) Ryan McNicol | PTS | 4 | 4 Nov 2011 | (United Kingdom) Doncaster Dome, Doncaster, England | |
| 3 | Win | 3–0 | (United Kingdom) Adam Hutchinson | PTS | 4 | 8 Apr 2011 | (United Kingdom) Metrodome, Barnsley, England | |
| 2 | Win | 2–0 | (Latvia) Pavels Senkovs | PTS | 6 | 4 Mar 2011 | (United Kingdom) Doncaster Dome, Doncaster, England | |
| 1 | Win | 1–0 | (Bulgaria) Plamen Kostadinov | PTS | 4 | 3 Dec 2010 | (United Kingdom) Doncaster Dome, Doncaster, England | |

Sporting positions
Regional boxing titles
| Vacant Title last held by Josh Wale | BBBofC Central Area super-bantamweight champion 1 Sep 2012 – Nov 2013; Vacated | Vacant Title next held by Muheeb Fazeldin |
| Vacant Title last held by Kid Galahad | British super-bantamweight champion 22 Feb 2014 – Aug 2014; Vacated | Vacant Title next held by Jazza Dickens |
| Vacant Title last held by Genesis Servania | WBO Inter-Continental super-bantamweight champion 25 Oct 2014 – Feb 2015; Vacated | Vacant Title next held by Genesis Servania |
| Vacant Title last held by Kid Galahad | European super-bantamweight champion 28 Mar 2015 – Dec 2015; Vacated | Vacant Title next held by Abigail Medina |
| Vacant Title last held by Qiu Xiaojun | WBC Silver super-bantamweight champion 27 Feb 2016 – 25 Feb 2017; Lost bid for world title | Vacant Title next held by Julio Ceja |
