= Gamal Yafai =

British boxer (born 1991)

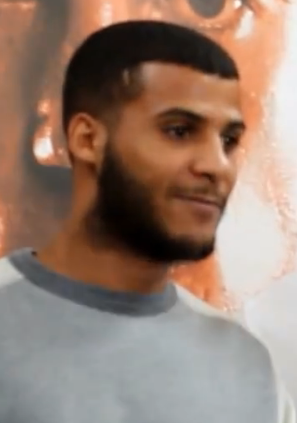
- Yafai in 2015

Personal information
- Nickname: The Beast
- Born: 4 August 1991 (age 35) Birmingham, England
- Height: 5 ft 7 in (170 cm)
- Weight: Super-bantamweight

Boxing career
- Stance: Orthodox

Boxing record
- Total fights: 22
- Wins: 19
- Win by KO: 11
- Losses: 3
Medal record
Men's amateur boxing
Representing Great Britain
European Championships
| Bronze medal – third place | 2010 Moscow | Bantamweight |

Gamal Yafai (Arabic: جمال يافعي; born 4 August 1991) is a British professional boxer. He held the European super-bantamweight title between 2020 and May 2021 and previously held the Commonwealth super-bantamweight title in 2016. As an amateur he won a bronze medal at the 2010 European Championships.

== Personal life ==
Gamal Yafai was born in Birmingham, England, on 4 August 1991 to Yemeni parents. He is the brother of Olympic champion flyweight Galal Yafai and former world professional flyweight champion Kal Yafai. Like them, Yafai was also a member of the Great Britain elite squad.

== Amateur career ==
Gamal boxed for the Birmingham City Police ABC and was a member of the Great Britain elite squad trained by Robert McCracken and funded with money from the National Lottery.

In June 2007 gamal won a European junior bronze medal, 3 months later he then went onto winning a silver medal at the world junior championships in Azerbaijan. In June 2010 Gamal won the bronze medal at the 2010 European Championships in Moscow. En route to the semi-finals Yafai beat Israels Peter Moyshenzon 11–1 in the 1st round, Italy's Vittorio Parrinello 5–3 in the second and Irelands John Joe Nevin, a World bronze medalist, in the quarter finals. Yafai lost in the semi-final 3–2 to the Russian Eduard Abzalimv and so securing the bronze medal. The tournament was Yafai's first outing at senior international level.

Domestically at only 17 years of age was crowned ABA flyweight champion in 2009 with a win over Adam Whitfield beating him 11–5 in the final. Gamal followed in the footsteps of his brother Khalid who won an ABA title in 2008. Of the victory Yafai's coach at his club in Birmingham Frank O'Sullivan said "I was concerned about Gamal’s stamina but he handled it well...He boxed superbly to instructions and finished the first round 2–2. At the end of the second it was 5–5 and Gamal then went all out to win and stormed to success 11–5...It was a cracking victory and now Gamal can go on and establish his own career and will, for instance, be boxing in the three nations for England at Liverpool at the end of May." Yafai did indeed box in the three nations tournament featuring competitors from England, Wales and Scotland once again meeting Adam Whitfield in the final and once again coming out on top, this time 13–4.

== Professional career ==
=== Early career ===
A 22-year-old Yafai turned professional in May 2014 at the First Direct Arena in Leeds on a Sky Sports card promoted by Matchroom Sport. Yafai defeated Ricky Leach via a 1st-round TKO in a scheduled four round fight. Ten days later, Yafai fought on the undercard of Froch-Groves II at Wembley Stadium against Jack Heath. Referee wisely stopped contest in round 1 with just 20 seconds remaining. Health was down twice, first from a head shot, and then a left hook to the body. On 12 July, Yafai defeated 31-year-old Spanish journeyman Reynaldo Cajina on points. Referee John Latham scored it 40–36 to Yafai. Two months later, Yafai faced off against French boxer Sofian Bellahcene at Wembley Arena, outpointing him (60–54) on the referee scorecard.

After a 6-month lay off, Yafai returned to the boxing ring in March 2015, beating Polish boxer Krzysztof Rogowski at the Ice Arena in Hull via 3rd-round TKO. Two months later, Yafai fought at the Barclaycard Arena in Birmingham beating Spanish boxer Arnoldo Solano (14–7, 0 KOs) via points decision. The referee scored it 80–71 for Yafai. In August, Yafai defeated Spanish boxer Angel Lorente at the Craven Park Stadium in Hull via a 6-round points decision, after knocking him down once in round 5. The referee Michael Alexander scored it 60–53.

On 17 October 2015, Yafai was scheduled in his first ever 10 round bout as a professional at the Barclaycard Arena against Tanzanian boxer Nasibu Ramadhani. This was also a Commonwealth super-bantamweight title eliminator. Yafai defied an injured left hand to earn a comprehensive 99–91 points victory. Yafai sustained the injury inside the opening three rounds and was put on the back foot, but regained his composure in the fifth and was on top by the sixth as he started landing hooks on Ramadhani, who struggled to connect.

=== Domestic and Regional ===
==== Yafai vs. Jenkinson ====
On 5 March 2016, in his ninth professional fight, Yafai stopped Bobby Jenkinson (9–1–1, 2 KOs) in seven rounds at the Genting Arena in Birmingham to take the Commonwealth super-bantamweight title. yafai picked up a cut four rounds in but followed up with a blistering show that ended with two knockdowns. The first knockdown coming from a straight left and the second from a left hook to the body. The victory took Yafai to 9–0, gave him his first belt and showed the watching boxing world he has the talent to follow in the footsteps of Carl Frampton and Scott Quigg in the future.

==== Yafai vs. Wale ====
It was announced that Yafai would make a first defence of his title at the First Direct Arena on 30 July. His opponent was announced to be Josh Wale (20–8–2, 11 KOs). Yafai was taken the 12 round distance for the first time since turning professional in 2014, making a first successful defence of his Commonwealth title. Yafai started off sharp and cut Wale over the right eye in the round 1, although a replay showed that it was due to a clash of heads. The three judges scored it 118–111, 117–112, 117–112, all in favour of Yafai.

Yafai was due to defend his Commonwealth title on 22 October 2016 against Sean Davis at the Barclaycard Arena on the undercard of Gavin-Eggington, however on 17 October Yafai had to pull out after injuring his ankle in a training session. Paul Economides instead fought Davis for the vacant WBC International title and Gamal's brother Kal was also added to the card which was a warm-up fight.

==== Yafai vs. Gigolashvili ====
On 22 February 2017, Yafai lost his Commonwealth super bantamweight title after failing to take part in a mandatory. On 27 February, promoter Eddie Hearn announced that Yafai would travel to Germany for his first fight not on home soil on the undercard of the WBA (regular) light middleweight title fight between Demetrius Andrade and Jack Culcay at the Friedrich-Ebert-Halle in Ludwigshafen, Rhineland-Palatinate. Yafai put on a concrete display throughout the six round fight to win via unanimous decision against Georgian journeyman Khvicha Gigolashvili.

==== Yafai vs. Davis ====
On 15 March, it was confirmed that Yafai would finally get a chance to compete for the WBC International title against undefeated titlist Sean Davis on the undercard of Kal's first world title defence at the Barclaycard Arena in Birmingham on 13 May 2017. Yafai knocked Davis down six times winning the fight via stoppage in round 7. The first knockdown came in round 3, two more knockdowns following in round 5 and a further three knockdowns in round 7 before the fight was halted. Two of the knockdowns in round 7 where due to hard body shots.

==== Yafai vs. Starkey ====
In December 2017, Yafai spoke to Sky Sports discussing 2017 as a frustrating year. He stated that he wanted to fight British champion Thomas Patrick Ward in 2018. Yafai was scheduled to fight at the York Hall in London on 13 December, which Yafai said would help 'get rid of ring-rust'. This would mark the first time Yafai would fight at York Hall as a professional. Yafai fought a scheduled six round bout against Liverpool boxer Ricky Starkey, stopping him in the third round. Yafai next planned to fight again in January 2018.

==== Yafai vs. McDonnell ====
On 22 December, Eddie Hearn announced that Yafai would make his first defence of the WBC International title against fellow British rival and former world title challenger Gavin McDonnell (18–1–2, 5 KOs) at the FlyDSA Arena in Sheffield on the undercard of Kell Brook's return bout on 3 March 2018. Yafai opened the Okolie vs. Chamberlain card at the O2 Arena in London on 3 February 2018 stopping Jose Hernandez in round 3 of their scheduled six round fight. McDonnell showed he had too much experience for Yafai in beating him via a 12 round unanimous decision, also winning the WBC International title. McDonnell used his height and reach advantage to win majority of the rounds, whilst also being more active. The three judges scored the fight 116–112, 116–112 and 117–113 in favour of McDonnell. In defeat, Yafai did well to land the occasional shots but ultimately could not keep up his work rate to match McDonnell.

==== Yafai vs. Aguilar ====
Yafai's next fight date was announced in July 2018, to be part of the JD: NXTGEN card on 4 August at the Ice Arena in Cardiff, Wales. He was also scheduled to fight at the Arena Birmingham on 8 September 2018. He fought Nicaraguan boxer Jose Aguilar in a 6 round fight and stopped him with a left hook body shot in round 3.

==== Yafai vs. Mairena ====
Yafai was next scheduled to fight in his home city of Birmingham on 8 September on the Amir Khan vs. Samuel Vargas card. In a scheduled 8 round bout, Yafai knocked out Nicaraguan boxer Brayan Mairena in round 7.

==== Yafai vs. Rigoldi ====
On 17 December 2020, Yafai fought Luca Rigoldi, who was ranked #12 by the WBC and #13 by the IBF at super bantamweight. Yafai beat Rigoldi on points after twelve rounds of action.

==== Yafai vs. Cunningham ====
In his next bout, Yafai faced Jason Cunningham. In a close fight, Cunningham managed to edge out Yafai and win the fight via unanimous decision, 115-110, 114-111 and 114-111.

== Professional boxing record ==
| 22 fights | 19 wins | 3 losses |
|---|---|---|
| By knockout | 11 | 0 |
| By decision | 8 | 3 |

| No. | Result | Record | Opponent | Type | Round, time | Date | Location | Notes |
|---|---|---|---|---|---|---|---|---|
| 22 | Loss | 19–3 | (Argentina) Diego Alberto Ruiz | UD | 12 | 18 Feb 2023 | (United Kingdom) Nottingham Arena, Nottingham, England | |
| 21 | Win | 19–2 | (United Kingdom) Sean Cairns | TKO | 4 (8), 1:55 | 4 Jun 2022 | (United Kingdom) Motorpoint Arena, Cardiff, Wales | |
| 20 | Loss | 18–2 | (United Kingdom) Jason Cunningham | UD | 12 | 15 May 2021 | (United Kingdom) AO Arena, Manchester, England | Lost European super-bantamweight title |
| 19 | Win | 18–1 | (Italy) Luca Rigoldi | UD | 12 | 17 Dec 2020 | Allianz Cloud, Milan, Italy | Won European super-bantamweight title |
| 18 | Win | 17–1 | (United Kingdom) Lee Clayton | TKO | 3 (6), 1:35 | 2 Nov 2019 | (United Kingdom) Manchester Arena, Manchester, England | |
| 17 | Win | 16–1 | (Nicaragua) Brayan Mairena | KO | 7 (8), 0:57 | 8 Sep 2018 | (United Kingdom) Arena Birmingham, Birmingham, England | |
| 16 | Win | 15–1 | (Nicaragua) Jose Aguilar | TKO | 3 (6), 2:23 | 4 Aug 2018 | (United Kingdom) Ice Arena Wales, Cardiff, Wales | |
| 15 | Loss | 14–1 | (United Kingdom) Gavin McDonnell | UD | 12 | 3 Mar 2018 | (United Kingdom) FlyDSA Arena, Sheffield, England | Lost WBC International super-bantamweight title |
| 14 | Win | 14–0 | (Nicaragua) Jose Hernandez | KO | 3 (6), 0:46 | 3 Feb 2018 | (United Kingdom) The O2 Arena, London, England | |
| 13 | Win | 13–0 | (United Kingdom) Ricky Starkey | TKO | 3 (6), 1:59 | 13 Dec 2017 | (United Kingdom) York Hall, London, England | |
| 12 | Win | 12–0 | (United Kingdom) Sean Davis | TKO | 7 (12), 2:27 | 13 May 2017 | (United Kingdom) Barclaycard Arena, Birmingham, England | Won WBC International super-bantamweight title |
| 11 | Win | 11–0 | (Georgia (country)) Khvicha Gigolashvili | UD | 6 | 11 Mar 2017 | Friedrich-Ebert-Halle, Ludwigshafen, Germany | |
| 10 | Win | 10–0 | (United Kingdom) Josh Wale | UD | 12 | 30 July 2016 | (United Kingdom) First Direct Arena, Leeds, England | Retained Commonwealth super-bantamweight title |
| 9 | Win | 9–0 | (United Kingdom) Bobby Jenkinson | KO | 7 (12), 2:11 | 5 Mar 2016 | (United Kingdom) Genting Arena, Birmingham, England | Won Commonwealth super-bantamweight title |
| 8 | Win | 8–0 | (Tanzania) Nasibu Ramadhani | PTS | 10 | 17 Oct 2015 | (United Kingdom) Barclaycard Arena, Birmingham, England | |
| 7 | Win | 7–0 | (Spain) Angel Lorente | PTS | 6 | 1 Aug 2015 | (United Kingdom) Craven Park Stadium, Hull, England | |
| 6 | Win | 6–0 | (Spain) Arnoldo Solano | PTS | 8 | 9 May 2015 | (United Kingdom) Barclaycard Arena, Birmingham, England | |
| 5 | Win | 5–0 | (Poland) Krzysztof Rogowski | TKO | 3 (6), 2:32 | 7 Mar 2015 | (United Kingdom) Hull Arena, Hull, England | |
| 4 | Win | 4–0 | (France) Sofian Bellahcene | PTS | 6 | 20 Sep 2014 | (United Kingdom) Wembley Arena, London, England | |
| 3 | Win | 3–0 | (Spain) Reynaldo Cajina | PTS | 4 | 12 July 2014 | (United Kingdom) Echo Arena, Liverpool, England | |
| 2 | Win | 2–0 | (United Kingdom) Jack Heath | TKO | 1 (4), 2:40 | 31 May 2014 | (United Kingdom) Wembley Stadium, London, England | |
| 1 | Win | 1–0 | (United Kingdom) Ricky Leach | TKO | 1 (4), 1:46 | 21 May 2014 | (United Kingdom) First Direct Arena, Leeds, England | |

== Titles in boxing ==
Regional/International titles:

- Commonwealth super bantamweight champion (122 lbs)
