= Jason Cunningham =

English boxer (born 1989)

Personal information
- Nickname: The Iceman
- Nationality: English
- Born: 26 September 1989 (age 36) Doncaster, England
- Height: 5 ft 7 in (170 cm)
- Weight: Super-flyweight; Bantamweight; Super-bantamweight; Featherweight

Boxing career
- Stance: Southpaw

Boxing record
- Total fights: 40
- Wins: 32
- Win by KO: 7
- Losses: 7
- No contests: 1

Jason Cunningham (born 26 September 1989) is a British professional boxer. He held the British, Commonwealth and European super-bantamweight titles from 2021 to 2022, the Commonwealth featherweight title in 2017, and the Commonwealth bantamweight title in 2015.

== Amateur career ==
Cunningham won the 2011 Amateur Boxing Association British flyweight title, when boxing out of the St Paul's ABC, having been a finalist in 2009 boxing for Doncaster Plant Works ABC.

== Professional career ==
He has held the European super-bantamweight title since May 2021 and previously held the Commonwealth bantamweight title in 2015; the Commonwealth featherweight title in 2017; and challenged once for the British super-flyweight title in 2015.

== Professional boxing record ==
40 fights	32 wins	7 losses
By knockout	7	2
By decision	25	5
No contests	1	

No.	Result	Record	Opponent	Type	Round, time	Date	Location	Notes
40	Loss	32–7 (1)	Liam Davies	TKO	1 (12), 2:46	29 Jul 2023	Telford International Centre, Telford, England	Lost WBO International super bantamweight title; For British, WBC International and European super bantamweight titles
39	Win	32–6 (1)	Miguel Gonzalez	UD	10	25 Mar 2023	Telford International Centre, Telford, England	Won vacant WBO International super bantamweight title
38	NC	31–6 (1)	Zolani Tete	KO	4 (12), 0:34	2 Jul 2022	Wembley Arena, Wembley, England	Originally a KO win for Tete, but changed to NC due to a failed drug test; Retained Commonwealth and IBF International super bantamweight titles; For vacant WBO International super bantamweight title
37	Win	31–6	Terry Le Couviour	KO	6 (12), 0:53	16 Apr 2022	Telford International Centre, Telford, England	Retained European and IBF International super bantamweight title
36	Win	30–6	Brad Foster	UD	12	9 Oct 2021	Arena Birmingham, Birmingham, England	Retained European super bantamweight title; Won British, Commonwealth and IBF International super bantamweight titles
35	Win	29–6	Gamal Yafai	UD	12	15 May 2021	Manchester Arena, Manchester, England	Won European super bantamweight title
34	Win	28–6	Michael Horabin	PTS	4	22 Feb 2020	Doncaster Dome, Doncaster, England	
33	Win	27–6	Adam Hutchinson	PTS	6	4 Oct 2019	Doncaster Dome, Doncaster, England	
32	Win	26–6	Michael Mooney	PTS	4	19 Jul 2019	Magna Centre, Rotherham, England	
31	Win	25–6	Josh Kennedy	UD	10	11 May 2019	Doncaster Dome, Doncaster, England	
30	Loss	24–6	Michael Conlan	UD	10	22 Dec 2018	Manchester Arena, Manchester, England	For vacant WBO Inter-Continental featherweight title
29	Win	24–5	Paul Economides	PTS	10	16 Sep 2018	Doncaster Dome, Doncaster, England	Won British Central Area super bantamweight title
28	Loss	23–5	Jordan Gill	UD	10	25 Feb 2018	Victoria Warehouse, Manchester, England	
27	Loss	23–4	Reece Bellotti	TKO	6 (12), 0:40	13 Oct 2017	York Hall, London, England	Lost Commonwealth featherweight title
26	Win	23–3	Jay Carney	PTS	6	2 Sep 2017	Doncaster Dome, Doncaster, England	
25	Win	22–3	Ben Jones	SD	12	8 Apr 2017	York Hall, London, England	Won vacant Commonwealth featherweight title
24	Win	21–3	Jamie Speight	PTS	10	4 Mar 2017	Doncaster Dome, Doncaster, England	
23	Win	20–3	Harvey Hemsley	PTS	6	16 Dec 2016	Barnsley Metrodome, Barnsley, England	
22	Win	19–3	Andy Harris	PTS	4	3 Sep 2016	Doncaster Dome, Doncaster, England	
21	Win	18–3	Ashley Lane	UD	10	27 Feb 2016	Doncaster Dome, Doncaster, England	Won vacant English bantamweight title
20	Loss	17–3	Kal Yafai	UD	12	17 Oct 2015	Arena Birmingham, Birmingham, England	For vacant British super flyweight title
19	Win	17–2	Marlon Prado	PTS	6	5 Sep 2015	Leeds Arena, Leeds, England	
18	Win	16–2	Nasibu Ramadhani	RTD	9 (12), 3:00	15 May 2015	IceSheffield, Sheffield, England	Won vacant Commonwealth bantamweight title
17	Win	15–2	Brett Fidoe	PTS	6	2 May 2015	Doncaster Dome, Doncaster, England	
16	Win	14–2	Csaba Kovacs	PTS	8	28 Feb 2015	Doncaster Dome, Doncaster, England	
15	Loss	13–2	Jason Booth	PTS	10	29 Nov 2014	Doncaster Dome, Doncaster, England	
14	Win	13–1	Ignac Kassai	TKO	4 (4), 1:06	7 Nov 2014	Doncaster Racecourse, Doncaster, England	
13	Loss	12–1	Ross Burkinshaw	SD	12	6 Sep 2014	Doncaster Dome, Doncaster, England	For vacant Commonwealth bantamweight title
12	Win	12–0	Dato Kvaratskhelia	RTD	4 (6), 3:00	7 Jun 2014	Newcastle Arena, Newcastle upon Tyne, England	
11	Win	11–0	Isaac Owusu	RTD	5 (10), 3:00	10 May 2014	Doncaster Dome, Doncaster, England	
10	Win	10–0	Scott Gladwin	RTD	4 (10), 3:00	8 Mar 2014	Doncaster Dome, Doncaster, England	Won vacant English bantamweight title
9	Win	9–0	Kyle King	PTS	4	14 Sep 2013	Magna Centre, Rotherham, England	
8	Win	8–0	Usman Ahmed	RTD	4 (10), 3:00	11 May 2013	Eco-Power Stadium, Doncaster, England	
7	Win	7–0	Anwar Alfadli	PTS	4	1 Dec 2012	Doncaster Dome, Doncaster, England	
6	Win	6–0	Delroy Spencer	PTS	4	28 Sep 2012	Magna Centre, Rotherham, England	
5	Win	5–0	Janis Puksins	PTS	6	19 May 2012	KC Sports Arena, Kingston upon Hull, England	
4	Win	4–0	Anwar Alfadli	PTS	4	26 Apr 2012	DoubleTree Hilton Hotel, Sheffield, England	
3	Win	3–0	Ryan McNicol	PTS	4	24 Mar 2012	Ponds Forge, Sheffield, England	
2	Win	2–0	Delroy Spencer	PTS	4	18 Feb 2012	Magna Centre, Rotherham, England	
1	Win	1–0	Anwar Alfadli	PTS	6	9 Dec 2011	Hull City Hall, Kingston upon Hull, England	
