= List of British super-bantamweight boxing champions =

List of British super-bantamweight boxing champions is a table showing the boxers who have won the British super-bantamweight title, which has been the British Boxing Board of Control (BBBoC) since 1994.

A champion will often voluntarily relinquish the title in order to fight for a higher-ranked championship, such as the world or European. Where the date on which a champion relinquished the title is unclear, the date of the last BBBoC sanctioned fight is shown.

^{r}–Champion relinquished title.

^{s}–Champion stripped of title.

| Name | Duration of reign | Defences |
|---|---|---|
| Richie Wenton | 26 April 1994 – 6 February 1996^{r} | 2 |
| Michael Brodie | 22 March 1997 – 31 January 1998^{r} | 2 |
| Patrick Mullings | 6 February 1999 – 24 April 1999 | 1 |
| Drew Docherty | 24 April 1999^{r} | 0 |
| Michael Alldis | 6 November 1999 – 14 July 2001 | 3 |
| Patrick Mullings | 14 July 2001^{r} | 0 |
| Michael Alldis | 18 March 2002^{r} | 0 |
| Esham Pickering | 12 July 2003^{r} | 0 |
| Michael Hunter | 16 April 2004 – 28 October 2005^{r} | 3 |
| Esham Pickering | 16 March 2007 – 27 June 2008 | 2 |
| Matthew Marsh | 27 June 2008 – 21 November 2008^{r} | 1 |
| Jason Booth | 17 April 2009 – 22 October 2011 | 5 |
| Scott Quigg | 22 October 2011 – 4 February 2012^{r} | 1 |
| Kid Galahad | 14 September 2013^{r} | 0 |
| Gavin McDonnell | 22 February 2014 — 21 May 2014^{r} | 1 |
| Jazza Dickens | 6 March 2015 — 13 May 2017 | 1 |
| Thomas Patrick Ward | 13 May 2017 — 11 Nov 2017^{r} | 1 |
| Brad Foster | 8 March 2018 — 9 October 2021 | 3 |
| Jason Cunningham | 9 October 2021 — 9 October 2021^{r} | 0 |
| Marc Leach | 11 March 2022 — 11 June 2022 | 1 |
| Liam Davies | 11 June 2022^{r} | 1 |
| Dennis McCann | 16 March 2024 | 0 |

== See also ==
- List of British heavyweight boxing champions
- List of British cruiserweight boxing champions
- List of British light-heavyweight boxing champions
- List of British super-middleweight boxing champions
- List of British middleweight boxing champions
- List of British light-middleweight boxing champions
- List of British welterweight boxing champions
- List of British light-welterweight boxing champions
- List of British lightweight boxing champions
- List of British super-featherweight boxing champions
- List of British featherweight boxing champions
- List of British bantamweight boxing champions
- List of British super-flyweight boxing champions
- List of British flyweight boxing champions
- List of British world boxing champions
