= Peter McGrail =

English boxer (born 1996)

Personal information
- Born: 31 May 1996 (age 30) Liverpool, England
- Height: 5 ft 7 in (170 cm)
- Weight: Super-bantamweight

Boxing career
- Reach: 65 in (165 cm)
- Stance: Southpaw

Boxing record
- Total fights: 15
- Wins: 13
- Win by KO: 7
- Losses: 2
Medal record
Men's amateur boxing
Representing Great Britain
European Games
Bronze medal – third place	2019 Minsk	Bantamweight
Youth Olympic Games
Bronze medal – third place	2014 Nanjing	Bantamweight
Representing England
World Championships
Bronze medal – third place	2017 Hamburg	Bantamweight
Bronze medal – third place	2019 Yekaterinburg	Featherweight
European Championships
Gold medal – first place	2017 Kharkiv	Bantamweight
EU Championships
Silver medal – second place	2018 Valladolid	Bantamweight
Commonwealth Games
Gold medal – first place	2018 Gold Coast	Bantamweight

Peter McGrail (born 31 May 1996) is a British professional boxer who as an amateur won gold at the 2018 Commonwealth Games.

== Amateur career ==
In 2014, he won bronze medals in the Youth Olympic Games and World Youth Championships. He won the 2016 Amateur Boxing Association British featherweight title.

In 2015, he won silver in the EUBC European Confederation U22 Boxing Championships.

In 2017, he became European champion and went on to claim bronze in the World Championships. and the following year in 2018, he won the gold medal in the Commonwealth Games held in the Gold Coast.

In 2019, McGrail was selected to compete at the European Games in Minsk, Belarus. He also competed at the World Championships in Yekaterinburg, Russia, where he won the bronze medal after losing by split decision (4:1) to Lázaro Álvarez in the semifinals.

He represented Great Britain at the 2020 Summer Olympics, but was eliminated in the preliminary round of 32.

== Professional career ==
McGrail turned professional in 2021. He won his first eight pro-fights before losing his unbeaten record when he was knocked out by JaRico O'Quinn in the fifth round of their contest at Desert Diamond Arena in Glendale, USA, on 16 December 2023.

A rematch was scheduled to take place at the Exhibition Centre in Liverpool on 27 April 2024. However, O'Quinn withdrew for personal reasons just over three weeks before the fight and was replaced by Marc Leach. McGrail defeated Leach by unanimous decision to win the vacant WBA International super-bantamweight title.

In his next fight, McGrail stopped Brad Foster in the second round at Canon Medical Arena in Sheffield, England, on 28 September 2024.

McGrail defeated the previously unbeaten Rhys Edwards, who had taken the fight as a late replacement, via unanimous decision on 21 December 2024, at Kingdom Arena in Riyadh, Saudi Arabia as part of the undercard for the heavyweight world title rematch between Oleksandr Usyk and Tyson Fury.

McGrail was scheduled to challenge IBO super-bantamweight champion Shabaz Masoud on 21 June 2025 at bp pulse LIVE Arena in Birmingham, but the fight was cancelled when Masoud withdrew after suffering an injury in training. McGrail defeated replacement opponent Ionut Baluta by majority decision over 10 rounds.

He eventually faced Masoud at Salle des Etoiles in Monte Carlo on 6 December 2025. The vacant European super-bantamweight title was at stake. McGrail, who had a point deducted in the 10th round for hitting Masoud on the back of his head during a clinch, lost by unanimous decision.

== Professional boxing record ==
15 fights	13 wins	2 losses
By knockout	7	1
By decision	6	1

No.	Result	Record	Opponent	Type	Round, time	Date	Location	Notes
14	Loss	12–2	Shabaz Masoud	UD	12	6 Dec 2025	Salle des Etoiles, Monte Carlo, Monaco	For vacant European super-bantamweight title
13	Win	12–1	Ionut Baluta	MD	10	21 Jun 2025	bp pulse LIVE Arena, Birmingham, England	Retained WBA International super-bantamweight title
12	Win	11–1	Rhys Edwards	UD	10	21 Dec 2024	Kingdom Arena, Riyadh, Saudi Arabia	
11	Win	10–1	Brad Foster	KO	2 (10), 1:08	28 Sep 2024	Canon Medical Arena, Sheffield, England	
10	Win	9–1	Marc Leach	UD	10	27 Apr 2024	Exhibition Centre, Liverpool, England	Won vacant WBA International super-bantamweight title
9	Loss	8–1	Ja'Rico O'Quinn	KO	5 (10), 2:19	16 Dec 2023	Desert Diamond Arena, Glendale, Arizona, U.S.	
8	Win	8–0	Fran Mendoza	UD	10	21 Oct 2023	M&S Bank Arena, Liverpool, England	Won vacant WBA Continental super-bantamweight title
7	Win	7–0	Nicolas Nahuel Botelli	UD	10	11 Mar 2023	Liverpool Olympia, Liverpool, England	
6	Win	6–0	Hironori Miyake	KO	2 (8), 2:00	13 Dec 2022	Ariake Arena, Tokyo, Japan	
5	Win	5–0	Alexander Espinoza	RTD	5 (10), 3:00	15 Oct 2022	Liverpool Olympia, Liverpool, England	
4	Win	4–0	Uriel Lopez Juarez	TKO	4 (8), 2:03	22 Apr 2022	M&S Bank Arena, Liverpool, England	
3	Win	3–0	Alexandru Ionita	TKO	2 (6), 3:00	19 Mar 2022	Aviation Club Tennis Centre, Dubai, United Arab Emirates	
2	Win	2–0	Engel Gomez	TKO	2 (6), 2:18	11 Dec 2021	M&S Bank Arena, Liverpool, England	
1	Win	1–0	Ed Harrison	UD	6	9 Oct 2021	M&S Bank Arena, Liverpool, England	
