= Chris Bourke (boxer) =

English boxer (born 1994)

Personal information
- Nationality: English
- Born: 4 October 1994 (age 31)
- Height: 5 ft 4 in (163 cm)
- Weight: Super-bantamweight, Bantamweight

Boxing career
- Stance: Southpaw

Boxing record
- Total fights: 15
- Wins: 13
- Win by KO: 8
- Losses: 2

Chris Bourke (born 4 October 1994) is an English former professional boxer. He held the WBC International super-bantamweight title in 2020 and 2021. Bourke also challenged for British titles in two weight divisions and the Commonwealth bantamweight championship.

== Career ==
After an amateur career which included representing the British Lionhearts in the 2017 World Series of Boxing, Bourke made his professional debut with a second round stoppage win over Ricky Leach at the Hilton Hotel in Mayfair, London, on 7 December 2018.

Unbeaten in his first seven pro-fights, he claimed the vacant Southern Area super-bantamweight title by defeating Ramez Mahmood on points at BT Sport Studio in Stratford on 25 July 2020.

In his next outing on 5 December 2020, Bourke stopped Michael Ramabeletsa in the second round at Church House in Westminster to win the vacant WBC International super-bantamweight title.

He successfully defended his title thanks to a unanimous decision success over James Beach Jr. at Wembley Arena in London on 24 July 2021.

Bourke faced Marc Leach for the vacant British super-bantamweight title at York Hall in London on 11 March 2022. He lost the fight, and his undefeated professional record, via unanimous decision.

He then went on a three-fight winning streak, before returning to York Hall to face Ashley Lane for the vacant British and Commonwealth bantamweight titles on 22 March 2024. Bourke lost via stoppage in the sixth round.

== Professional boxing record ==
| 15 fights | 13 wins | 2 losses |
|---|---|---|
| By knockout | 8 | 1 |
| By decision | 5 | 1 |

| No. | Result | Record | Opponent | Type | Round, time | Date | Location | Notes |
|---|---|---|---|---|---|---|---|---|
| 15 | Loss | 13–2 | Ashley Lane | TKO | 6 (12), 2:09 | 22 Mar 2024 | York Hall, London, England | For vacant British and Commonwealth bantamweight titles |
| 14 | Win | 13–1 | Adam Mbega | TKO | 4 (8), 2:58 | 6 Oct 2023 | York Hall, London, England | |
| 13 | Win | 12–1 | Kevin Trana | PTS | 6 | 12 May 2023 | York Hall, London, England | |
| 12 | Win | 11–1 | Darwing Martinez | TKO | 3 (6), 2:53 | 17 Feb 2023 | York Hall, London, England | |
| 11 | Loss | 10–1 | Marc Leach | UD | 12 | 11 Mar 2022 | York Hall, London, England | For vacant British super-bantamweight title |
| 10 | Win | 10–0 | James Beech Jr. | UD | 10 | 24 Jul 2021 | Wembley Arena, London, England | Retained WBC International super-bantamweight title |
| 9 | Win | 9–0 | Michael Ramabeletsa | TKO | 2 (10), 2:43 | 5 Dec 2020 | Church House, Westminster, England | Won vacant WBC International super-bantamweight title |
| 8 | Win | 8–0 | Ramez Mahmood | PTS | 10 | 25 Jul 2020 | BT Sport Studio, Stratford, England | Won vacant Southern Area super-bantamweight title |
| 7 | Win | 7–0 | Rafael Castillo | PTS | 4 | 17 Feb 2020 | Cliffs Pavilion, Westcliff-on-Sea, England | |
| 6 | Win | 6–0 | Louis Norman | TKO | 3 (6), 2:46 | 21 Dec 2019 | Copper Box Arena, London, England | |
| 5 | Win | 5–0 | Jose Hernandez | PTS | 6 | 14 Sep 2019 | York Hall, London, England | |
| 4 | Win | 4–0 | Ricky Starkey | TKO | 6 (6), 0:48 | 20 Jul 2019 | York Hall, London, England | |
| 3 | Win | 3–0 | Stefan Slavchev | KO | 2 (4), 2:36 | 27 Apr 2019 | Wembley Arena, London, England | |
| 2 | Win | 2–0 | Jake Pollard | TKO | 3 (4), 0:50 | 2 Feb 2019 | York Hall, London, England | |
| 1 | Win | 1–0 | Ricky Leach | TKO | 2 (4), 0:26 | 7 Dec 2018 | Hilton Hotel, Mayfair, London, England | |
