= Ben Jones (boxer) =

British former professional boxer

Personal information
- Nickname: Duracell Jones
- Nationality: British
- Born: Ben Jones; 12 June 1982 (age 44) Crawley, West Sussex, England
- Height: 5 ft 8 in (173 cm)
- Weight: Feather; Super featherweight; Lightweight

Boxing career
- Stance: Orthodox

Boxing record
- Total fights: 31
- Wins: 22
- Win by KO: 10
- Losses: 7
- Draws: 1
- No contests: 1

Ben 'Duracell' Jones (born 12 June 1982) is a British former professional boxer who competed from 2006 to 2018. He held multiple titles in three weight classes.

== Career ==
Based in Crawley, Jones turned professional in 2006. In his first fight he defeated Carl Allen via a points decision (PTS). He won his International Masters in bout against Ibrar Riyaz. Jones first title fight was in 2011, against Akaash Bhatia, which was stopped in the eighth round by the referee on a technical decision (TD).

Jones next bout was against Stephen Smith for the inter-continental super featherweight title. Three years later he would win the championship in a bout against Martin Parlagi. Being knocked down in the first round and getting back up Jones went the full ten rounds with the Czech and won the fight on a unanimous decision (UD). After losing to Stephen Smith, He would win the International lightweight title from Jamie Speight with a technical knockout (TKO). Jones was on the hunt for his third title belt in 2013. Scottish champion Kris Hughes was the current champion defending the title. Jones and Hughes went the full twelve rounds with Jones being given the unanimous decision (UD) and becoming the new European Super Featherweight champion. After winning the inter-continental super featherweight title in 2015 Jones went onto fight and lose against British boxer Reece Bellotti. The bout against Bellotti was for the IBA World Super Featherweight title and marked the end of Jones's professional boxing career.

== Professional record ==
Jones had a total of 31 fights as a professional boxer: 22 wins, 7 loses, 1 draw, and 1 no decision.
