= Sean Davis (boxer) =

English boxer (born 1990)

Personal information
- Nickname: Showtime
- Born: 15 January 1990 (age 36) Birmingham, West Midlands, England
- Weight: Super-bantamweight, Featherweight

Boxing career
- Stance: Orthodox

Boxing record
- Total fights: 33
- Wins: 14
- Win by KO: 0
- Losses: 19

Sean Davis (born 15 January 1990) is an English former professional boxer. During his career he was English super-bantamweight champion and challenged for the British title in the same weight division.

== Career ==
A professional since 2014, Davis won his first nine pro-fights before facing Jason Booth for the vacant English super-bantamweight title at The Venue in Edgbaston on 27 February 2016. He claimed the championship via unanimous decision.

He added the vacant WBC International super-bantamweight title to his collection on 22 October 2016, thanks to a unanimous decision victory over Paul Economides at the Utilita Arena in Birmingham.

Having vacated his English title, Davis returned to the Utilita Arena to make the first defense of his WBC International crown against Gamal Yafai on 13 May 2017. He lost his title and undefeated record by stoppage in the seventh round having been knocked to the canvas six times during the bout.

Despite this setback, he was given the chance to challenge British super-bantamweight champion Thomas Patrick Ward at Metro Radio Arena in Newcastle on 11 November 2017. He lost via unanimous decision.

Davis sought to become a two-weight English champion when he took on Reece Mould for the vacant featherweight title at Doncaster Racecourse on 22 June 2019, but lost by stoppage in the fourth round.

He fought on for three more years in a largely journeyman role before announcing his retirement in February 2023, 12 months after his last contest.
