= Josh Wale =

British boxer (born 1988)

Personal information
- Nickname: The Outlaw
- Nationality: British
- Born: 8 April 1988 (age 38)
- Height: 5 ft 7 in (170 cm)
- Weight: Bantamweight; Super bantamweight

Boxing career
- Stance: Orthodox

Boxing record
- Total fights: 45
- Wins: 32
- Win by KO: 15
- Losses: 11
- Draws: 2

Josh Wale (born 8 April 1988) is a British professional boxer. He held the British bantamweight title from 2017 to 2018. He challenged for the Commonwealth bantamweight title in 2012; the Commonwealth super bantamweight title in 2016; the European bantamweight title in 2018; and the British super bantamweight title three times between 2014 and 2019.

== Career ==
From Barnsley, Wale won a NABC schoolboy title and represented England as an amateur, and attended the National Boxing Academy at East Durham and Houghall Community College in Peterlee, where he also studied hairdressing.

He made his professional debut in October 2006 with a first-round stoppage if Neil Read. In his fifth fight, in December 2007, he stopped Mo Khaled in the fourth round to take the vacant BBBofC Central Area bantamweight title. He won his next two fights but suffered a first defeat in September 2008 when he was forced to retire in the corner due to severe damage to the right eye.

In September 2009 he faced Matthew Marsh at the York Hall, Bethnal Green, in what should have been a fight for the vacant English super bantamweight title, but Marsh failed to make the weight and despite beating Wale on points, the title remained vacant.

In 2010 Wale entered the Prizefighter tournament, beating Esham Pickering in the first round, yet losing to Willie Casey in the semi-finals. A year later he challenged for Craig Lyon's English bantamweight title; A clash of heads stopped the fight in the third round, with the fight declared a draw.

In May 2012 he challenged Kid Galahad for the WBC International super bantamweight title, Wale again forced to retire in the 9th round due to severe eye damage. Six months later he faced Stuart Hall for the vacant Commonwealth bantamweight title, losing by a wide points margin.

He again moved up to super bantamweight, and in September 2013 lost a British title eliminator to Gavin McDonnell. McDonnell went on to win the title, and in May 2014 defended against Wale, the fight ending a controversial draw. Many believed Wale had done enough to secure the title, whilst asking for a trilogy, McDonnell relinquished the belt. Wale got another shot in March 2015, facing Jazza Dickens for the vacant title at the Echo Arena, Liverpool. Dickens took a unanimous points decision, despite being deducted 2 points for deliberate use of the shoulder and holding.

In July 2016, Wale challenged for Gamal Yafai's Commonwealth title, again losing on points.

Wale dropped back down to bantamweight, and in March 2017 beat Ramesh Ahmadi via a split decision to take the English title. In July he faced Jamie Wilson at the Doncaster Dome for the vacant British title, this time taking a unanimous decision to win the Lonsdale Belt. In September 2017 he knocked out former Commonwealth and English Super Flyweight champion Don Broadhurst in his first defence of the British title, and impressively stopped Bobby Jenkinson in the ninth round in February 2018 in his second defence.
