= Marc Leach =

English boxer (born 1994)

Personal information
- Nickname: Livewire
- Born: 17 March 1994 (age 32) Salford, Greater Manchester, England
- Height: 5 ft 6 in (168 cm)
- Weight: Super-bantamweight, Bantamweight, Featherweight

Boxing career
- Stance: Southpaw

Boxing record
- Total fights: 23
- Wins: 18
- Win by KO: 4
- Losses: 4
- Draws: 1

Marc Leach (born 17 March 1994) is an English former professional boxer. He held the British super-bantamweight title in 2022. Leach was also English bantamweight champion in 2019.

== Career ==
Leach made his professional boxing debut at De Vere Whites Hotel in Bolton on 20 September 2014, losing on points over four rounds to Bobby Jenkinson.

He then went on a 14 fight undefeated run culminating in claiming his first title with a unanimous decision win over Brett Fidoe for the vacant English bantamweight championship at Victoria Warehouse in Manchester on 4 May 2019.

After this, Leach won three successive bouts which were all billed as eliminators for a shot at the British super-bantamweight title, registering unanimous decision successes over Scott Allan in Glasgow on 19 September 2019, Qais Ashfaq in Peterborough on 17 October 2020 and Thomas Essomba in Sheffield on 5 June 2021.

He finally got his chance at the vacant title against unbeaten Chris Bourke at York Hall in London on 11 March 2022, winning via unanimous decision.

His reign as champion would prove to be a short one as he lost the title in his first defense against Liam Davies at the International Centre in Telford on 11 June 2022. Leach was knocked to the canvas in the first round and, although he recovered to continue the fight and complete the full 12 rounds, he suffered a unanimous decision defeat.

After almost 16 months out of the competitive boxing ring, Leach returned at a new weight division to face Masood Abdulah for the vacant Commonwealth Silver featherweight title at York Hall on 6 October 2023. Having sustained heavy punishment throughout the contest, he retired on his stool at the end of the seventh round.

Back at super-bantamweight, in what would prove to be his final fight, Leach took on Peter McGrail for the vacant WBA International title at the Exhibition Centre in Liverpool on 27 April 2024, losing by unanimous decision.

He announced his retirement from professional boxing in January 2025.

== Professional boxing record ==
23 fights	18 wins	4 losses
By knockout	4	1
By decision	14	3
Draws	1	

No.	Result	Record	Opponent	Type	Round, time	Date	Location	Notes
22	Loss	18–4–1	Peter McGrail	UD	10	27 Apr 2024	Exhibition Centre, Liverpool, England	For vacant WBA International super-bantamweight title
21	Loss	18–3–1	Masood Abdulah	RTD	7 (10), 3:00	6 Oct 2023	York Hall, London, England	For vacant Commonwealth Silver featherweight title
20	Loss	18–2–1	Liam Davies	UD	12	11 Jun 2022	Telford International Centre, Telford, England	Lost British super-bantamweight title
19	Win	18–1–1	Chris Bourke	UD	12	11 Mar 2022	York Hall, London, England	Won vacant British super-bantamweight title
19	Win	17–1–1	Stefan Nicolae	KO	1 (6), 0:26	4 Dec 2021	AJ Bell Stadium, Eccles, England	
18	Win	16–1–1	Thomas Essomba	UD	12	5 Jun 2021	Sheffield Arena Car Park, Sheffield, England	
17	Win	15–1–1	Qais Ashfaq	UD	10	17 Oct 2020	East of England Arena, Peterborough, England	
16	Win	14–1–1	Scott Allan	UD	10	19 Sep 2019	Radisson Blu Hotel, Glasgow, Scotland	
15	Win	13–1–1	Brett Fidoe	UD	10	4 May 2019	Victoria Warehouse, Manchester, England	Won vacant English bantamweight title
14	Win	12–1–1	Khvicha Gigolashvili	PTS	6	16 Mar 2019	Oldham Leisure Centre, Oldham, England	
13	Win	11–1–1	Louis Norman	TKO	2 (10), 1:40	15 Sep 2018	Victoria Warehouse, Manchester, England	
12	Draw	10–1–1	Tapiwa Tembo	MD	8	13 Jul 2018	International Convention Center, Harare, Zimbabwe	
11	Win	10–1	Dmitrijs Gutmans	PTS	6	24 Feb 2018	De Vere Whites Hotel, Bolton, England	
10	Win	9–1	Simas Volosinas	PTS	6	10 Nov 2017	Victoria Warehouse, Manchester, England	
9	Win	8–1	Brett Fidoe	PTS	6	18 Feb 2017	Victoria Warehouse, Manchester, England	
8	Win	7–1	Krzysztof Rogowski	RET	4 (8), 3:00	20 Feb 2016	Hilton Manchester Deansgate, Manchester, England	
7	Win	6–1	Ian Halsall	PTS	4	7 Nov 2015	Echo Arena, Liverpool, England	
6	Win	5–1	Mihaly Telekfi	PTS	4	12 Sep 2015	Evoque Nightclub, Preston, England	
5	Win	4–1	Brett Fidoe	PTS	4	10 Jul 2015	Piccadilly Hotel, Manchester, England	
4	Win	3–1	Valentin Marinov	TKO	2 (4), ?:??	13 Jun 2015	Evoque Nightclub, Preston, England	
3	Win	2–1	Anwar Alfadli	PTS	4	28 Mar 2015	Evoque Nightclub, Preston, England	
2	Win	1–1	Francis Croes	PTS	6	14 Dec 2014	De Vere Whites Hotel, Bolton, England	
1	Loss	0–1	Bobby Jenkinson	PTS	4	20 Sep 2014	De Vere Whites Hotel, Bolton, England	
