= Charlie Edwards (boxer) =

British boxer (born 1993)

Personal information
- Born: Charlie Edwards; 8 February 1993 (age 33) Sutton, London, England
- Height: 5 ft 6 in (168 cm)
- Weight: Flyweight; Super flyweight; Bantamweight

Boxing career
- Reach: 66 in (168 cm)
- Stance: Orthodox

Boxing record
- Total fights: 25
- Wins: 21
- Win by KO: 7
- Losses: 3
- No contests: 1
Medal record
Men's amateur boxing
Representing England
European Championships
Bronze medal – third place	2011 Ankara	Light-flyweight
Great Britain Championships
Gold medal – first place	2010 Liverpool	Light-flyweight
Gold medal – first place	2011 London	Light-flyweight
Amateur Boxing Association Championships
Gold medal – first place	2011 Colchester	Light-flyweight
Gold medal – first place	2014 Liverpool	Flyweight

Charlie Edwards (born 8 February 1993) is a British professional boxer who held the World Boxing Council (WBC) flyweight title from 2018 to 2019. He has also held the British super-flyweight title and the European bantamweight title during his career.

== Early life ==
Edwards was born on 8 February 1993, in Sutton, and is the older brother of former flyweight world champion, Sunny Edwards. He started boxing at the age of 11 as a means to lose weight and it was apparent early on that there existed a bright path for him within the sport if pursued with true commitment. He would then go on to represent the long-standing Repton Boxing Club in London, whilst also getting his brother Sunny into boxing. He grew up being influenced by legendary boxers Sugar Ray Leonard and Manny Pacquiao.

== Amateur career ==
He won the 2011 Amateur Boxing Association British light-flyweight title, when boxing out of the Lynn ABC. Three years later in 2014 he won the flyweight title boxing out of Repton ABC.

== Professional career ==
Edwards turned professional in 2015, debuting at The O2 Arena with a fourth-round technical knockout win. Edwards compiled a record of 13–1, and was ranked #15 by the WBC before shocking and defeating Cristofer Rosales to win the WBC flyweight title.

In September 2016 on the undercard of the Gennady Golovkin vs. Kell Brook title clash at the O2 Arena in London, England. Edwards challenged IBF flyweight champion John Riel Casimero but lost via 10th round stoppage, suffering his first professional defeat.

On 31 August 2019, Edwards defended his title against Julio Cesar Martínez at the O2 Arena on the undercard of Vasiliy Lomachenko vs. Luke Campbell. Martínez came out determined and managed to stop Edwards with 1:43 left in the third round. Edwards was not able to beat the count, and initially Martínez was awarded a knockout victory. After the video replay was shown, it was evident that Martínez had hit Edwards with a body shot with the latter already on the floor with one knee. The fight would therefore be ruled a no contest, with WBC president Mauricio Sulaiman ordering an immediate rematch.

In October 2019, he announced that he had vacated the WBC flyweight title due to health concerns over making weight at flyweight.

On 27 September 2024, Edwards won the European bantamweight title with a unanimous decision win over defending champion Thomas Essomba at York Hall in London. He vacated the title in January 2025 without making any defenses.

Edwards challenged British, Commonwealth and WBC Silver bantamweight champion Andrew Cain at Liverpool Arena on 15 March 2025. He lost by split decision with one of the ringside judges scoring the fight 115–113 in his favour while his two colleagues had it 116–112 and 115–114 respectively for Cain.

He faced Salvador Juarez for the vacant WBC International super-flyweight title at the 3Arena in Dublin, Ireland, on 5 September 2025, winning unanimous decision.

On 29 May 2026, Edwards fought Sikho Nqothole in a final eliminator for a shot at the IBF super-flyweight title at York Hall in London, but lost by unanimous decision.

== Professional boxing record ==
25 fights	21 wins	3 losses
By knockout	7	3
By decision	14	0
No contests	1	

No.	Result	Record	Opponent	Type	Round, time	Date	Location	Notes
25	Loss	21–3 (1)	Sikho Nqothole	UD	12	29 May 2026	York Hall, London, England	
24	Win	21–2 (1)	Salvador Juarez	UD	10	5 Sep 2025	3Arena, Dublin, Ireland	For vacant WBC International super-flyweight title
23	Loss	20–2 (1)	Andrew Cain	SD	12	15 Mar 2025	Liverpool Arena, Liverpool, England	For British, Commonwealth and WBC Silver bantamweight titles
22	Win	20–1 (1)	Thomas Essomba	UD	12	27 Sep 2024	York Hall, London, England	Won European bantamweight title
21	Win	19–1 (1)	Georges Ory	UD	10	12 Apr 2024	York Hall, London, England	Won vacant WBC International Silver bantamweight title
20	Win	18–1 (1)	Darwing Martinez	PTS	6	9 Jun 2023	Bowlers Exhibition Centre, Manchester, England	
19	Win	17–1 (1)	Jacob Barreto	TKO	2 (8), 1:35	3 Dec 2021	York Hall, London, England	
18	Win	16–1 (1)	Kyle Williams	PTS	10	26 Sep 2020	York Hall, London, England	
17	NC	15–1 (1)	Julio Cesar Martínez	TKO	3 (12), 1:43	31 Aug 2019	The O2 Arena, London, England	Retained WBC flyweight title; Originally KO win for Martinez, later ruled NC after Edwards hit while on one knee
16	Win	15–1	Angel Moreno	UD	12	23 Mar 2019	Copper Box Arena, London, England	Retained WBC flyweight title
15	Win	14–1	Cristofer Rosales	UD	12	22 Dec 2018	The O2 Arena, London, England	Won WBC flyweight title
14	Win	13–1	Anthony Nelson	TKO	3 (10), 2:48	16 Jun 2018	Metro Radio Arena, Newcastle, England	Won vacant WBA Continental super flyweight title
13	Win	12–1	Ricky Little	TKO	1 (8), 2:49	3 Feb 2018	The O2 Arena, London, England	
12	Win	11–1	Craig Derbyshire	PTS	8	13 Oct 2017	York Hall, London, England	
11	Win	10–1	Iain Butcher	UD	12	15 Apr 2017	The SSE Hydro, Glasgow, Scotland	Won vacant British super flyweight title
10	Win	9–1	Georgi Georgiev	TKO	3 (6), 2:14	26 Nov 2016	Wembley Arena, London, England	
9	Loss	8–1	John Riel Casimero	TKO	10 (12), 1:57	10 Sep 2016	The O2 Arena, London, England	For IBF flyweight title
8	Win	8–0	Jose Aguilar	UD	6	16 Jul 2016	Max-Schmeling-Halle, Berlin, Germany	
7	Win	7–0	Luke Wilton	UD	10	27 Feb 2016	Manchester Arena, Manchester, England	Won vacant WBC International Silver flyweight title
6	Win	6–0	Phil Smith	TKO	6 (10), 0:47	21 Nov 2015	Manchester Arena, Manchester, England	Retained English flyweight title
5	Win	5–0	Louis Norman	UD	10	12 Sep 2015	The O2 Arena, London, England	Won English flyweight title
4	Win	4–0	Juan Hinostroza	PTS	6	18 Jul 2015	Manchester Arena, Manchester, England	
3	Win	3–0	Brett Fidoe	PTS	6	28 May 2015	York Hall, London, England	
2	Win	2–0	Mikheil Soloninkini	TKO	3 (4), 2:00	28 Mar 2015	Sheffield Arena, Sheffield, England	
1	Win	1–0	Craig Derbyshire	TKO	4 (4), 2:54	31 Jan 2015	The O2 Arena, London, England	

== See also ==
- List of world flyweight boxing champions
- List of British world boxing champions

Sporting positions
Amateur boxing titles
Previous: Tommy Stubbs	ABA Light-Flyweight champion 2011	Next: Jack Bateson
Previous: Jack Bateson	ABA Flyweight champion 2014	Next: Muhammad Ali
Regional boxing titles
Preceded by Louis Norman	English super-flyweight champion 12 September 2015 – February 2016; Vacated	Vacant Title next held by Kyle Yousaf
Vacant Title last held by Narast Aienleng	WBC International Silver super-flyweight champion 27 February 2016 – August 2016; Vacated	Vacant Title next held by Sebastian Sanchez
Vacant Title last held by Kal Yafai	British super-flyweight champion 15 April 2017 – 2018; Vacated	Vacant Title next held by Sunny Edwards
New title	WBA Continental super-flyweight champion 16 June 2018 – November 2018; Vacated	Vacant
World boxing titles
Preceded by Cristofer Rosales	WBC flyweight champion 22 December 2018 – 4 October 2019; Vacated	Vacant Title next held by Julio Cesar Martinez
