= MTK Global =

Boxing management company

- Founder: Daniel Kinahan

MTK Global (Mack The Knife Global) was a boxing and mixed martial arts management and event promotions company founded by Irish suspected crime boss Daniel Kinahan and former professional boxer Matthew 'Mack the Knife' Macklin . Originally established in 2012 as Macklin's Gym Marbella (MGM), the undertaking has attracted controversy due to its links to the Kinahan cartel and related allegations of money laundering, and MTK Global announced its closure in April 2022.

Since its founding in 2012, MTK Global signed fighters such as Tyson Fury, Billy Joe Saunders, Josh Taylor, Carl Frampton, Terry Flanagan, Charlie Edwards, Rocky Fielding, Hughie Fury, Michael Conlan, Paddy Barnes, Jamel Herring, and Amansio Paraschiv.

== History ==
MTK Global originally formed as MGM, an acronym for Macklins Gym Marbella, starting out as a boxing gym in Marbella, Spain, in September 2012. In 2017, following lengthy talks with MGM Grand Resort and Casino over a naming dispute, MGM was renamed MTK Global.

In December 2017, it was announced UFC star Darren Till had signed with the company, marking MTK Global's entry into MMA.

In March 2019, it was announced that MTK Global and Top Rank had signed a multi-year deal that would see MTK's events broadcast exclusively on ESPN platforms in the United States. Top Rank founder Bob Arum said of the deal; "MTK Global manages a vast number of A-list fighters from around the globe. This deal will enable Top Rank, through the ESPN family of networks, to afford viewers in the United States the opportunity to see these great fighters perform."

In November 2019, the company announced that it had entered into a partnership with The Academy of Sports and Education to form the MTK National Boxing and Education Academy. It was a program designed for 16–18 year olds aimed at enabling them to gain relevant qualifications relating to a career in the sport of boxing, such as professional boxer, physiotherapist, coach or in sports journalism. The first academy was opened in London in January 2020, with the goal to establish the program across the United Kingdom by September.

In February 2021 the company announced that it had started a football agency and would manage professional soccer players.

In April 2022 Bob Yalen resigned as CEO, citing 'the pressure of the last few weeks'. It came just over a week after Daniel Kinahan became the subject of global sanctions by the United States Government.

In April 2022 the company issued a press release announcing that it would cease operations by the end of the month. The company claimed that it had faced "unprecedented levels of unfair scrutiny and criticism" after the United States government enacted worldwide sanctions against Daniel Kinahan.

== The Golden Contract ==
In July 2019, it was announced MTK Global would host a new boxing tournament, The Golden Contract. The tournament will be held across three weight-classes – featherweight, light-welterweight and light-heavyweight – with eight fighters competing in each division and the winners securing a two-year, five-fight contract with MTK Global. The fights will be aired live on Sky Sports in the United Kingdom and streamed on ESPN+ in the United States.

== Controversies ==
MTK Global has been criticised in the Irish media for its links to gangland figures, in particular, co-founder Daniel Kinahan, a reputed member Ireland's notorious Kinahan Cartel.

On 5 February 2016, an alleged associate of the Kinahan Cartel, David Byrne, was shot dead after armed men dressed as Gardaí stormed a boxing weigh-in held at the Regency Hotel in Dublin, Ireland, for an event promoted by MTK Global.

In September 2016, Spanish police raided MGM Marbella in Puerto Banús as part of an international crackdown on the Kinahan Cartel's criminal activities, searching properties in both Spain and Ireland. One man, Jamie Quinn, said to have worked at the MGM Marbella gym, was arrested at a Spanish airport for the murder of Gary Hutch.

Due to the criticisms, CEO Sandra Vaughan announced a boycott of Irish media in 2018. In May 2020 MTK announced it had agreed a partnership with Kinahan, who had previously sold his share and distanced himself from the company. Following the announcement, it was widely reported that the Irish police believed the Kinahan Cartel planned to use MTK as a front for criminal activities.

=== Summons served ===
In December 2020 a racketeering summons was served to Kinahan, Golden Boy Promotions and MTK Global in the United Arab Emirates by US lawyers. Boxing promoter Moses Heredia filed a civil cause of action over the signing of Joseph Diaz while he was under contract to Heredia Boxing Management (HBM). He alleged that after Diaz won the world championship in 2020 MTK had offered him an advance of $100,000 (₡81,500) in breach of a five-year contract the boxer had signed with HBM. HBM also claims that Kinahan and MTK are in breach of the RICO Act, which can be used in civil cases. HBM alleges that Kinahan founded MTK Global as a "front business" to launder illicit proceeds from drug trafficking, and despite claims that Kinahan is no longer involved with the organisation, he is still "influencing and controlling" it. Kinahan has to file a response with the United States District Court for the Central District of California or face judgement being entered against him by default.

=== Legacy ===
Daniel Kinahan and his involvement in boxing with MTK Global were the subject of a documentary by BBC Panorama titled Boxing and the Mob that was aired on television in 2021. The one hour documentary was narrated by journalist Darragh MacIntyre. Billy Joe Saunders, a boxer that was managed by MTK Global, stated that he received harassment and lost sponsorship deals in the aftermath of the BBC documentary. The BBC team who produced the Panorama program received threats after the documentary was broadcast. Police in Northern Ireland warned the journalists involved with making the documentary about an unspecified threat from unnamed criminal elements in relation to the program. Lawyers for MTK Global told Panorama that while Kinahan "provides some personal advice to a number of boxers managed by MTK Global, he had never owned, controlled or been an employee of the company."

The Amazon audiobook MTK Global On Everipedia was published in 2021. It was published on Amazon, Audible and Amazon Music in 13 countries. The hardcover book version of MTK Global On Everipedia is available on the Gyan Books website.

== Notable boxers ==
Boxer	Nationality	Weight
Joshua Adewale	(England) English	Middleweight
David Brophy	(Scotland) Scottish	Super-middleweight
Akeem Ennis-Brown	(England) English	Light-welterweight
Hekkie Budler	(South Africa) South African	Light-flyweight
Hosea Burton	(England) English	Light-heavyweight
Iain Butcher	(Scotland) Scottish	Bantamweight
Chantelle Cameron	(England) English	Light-welterweight
Danny Carr	(England) English	Welterweight
Jono Carroll	(Republic of Ireland) Irish	Super-featherweight
Jack Catterall	(England) English	Light-welterweight
Michael Conlan	(Republic of Ireland) Irish	Featherweight
Ohara Davies	(England) English	Light-welterweight
TJ Doheny	(Republic of Ireland) Irish	Super-bantamweight
Steven Donnelly	(Northern Ireland) Northern Irish	Light-middleweight
Charlie Edwards	(England) English	Flyweight
Sunny Edwards	(England) English	Super-flyweight
Larry Ekundayo	(Nigeria) Nigerian	Welterweight
Rocky Fielding	(England) English	Super-middleweight
Terry Flanagan	(England) English	Light-welterweight
Carl Frampton	(Northern Ireland) Northern Irish	Featherweight
Hughie Fury	(England) English	Heavyweight
Tyson Fury	(England) English	Heavyweight
Jay Harris	(Wales) Welsh	Flyweight
Jamel Herring	(United States) American	Super-featherweight
Natasha Jonas	(England) English	Lightweight
David Oliver Joyce	(Republic of Ireland) Irish	Featherweight
Elhem Mekhaled	(France) French	Super-featherweight
Martin Murray	(England) English	Super-middleweight
Amansio Paraschiv	(Romania) Romanian	Middleweight
David Price	(England) English	Heavyweight
Billy Joe Saunders	(England) English	Super-middleweight
Andrew Selby	(Wales) Welsh	Flyweight
Liam Smith	(England) English	Light-welterweight
Josh Taylor	(Scotland) Scottish	Light-welterweight
Liam Walsh	(England) English	Lightweight
Muhammad Waseem	(Pakistan) Pakistani	Flyweight
Shakhobidin Zoirov	(Uzbekistan) Uzbekistani	Bantamweight
