= Matt Windle =

English boxer (born 1990)

Personal information
- Nickname: MatMan
- Born: Matthew Michael Edward Windle; 30 September 1990 (age 35) Birmingham, West Midlands, England
- Height: 5 ft 4 in (163 cm)
- Weight: Light-flyweight, Flyweight

Boxing career
- Stance: Orthodox

Boxing record
- Total fights: 14
- Wins: 7
- Win by KO: 1
- Losses: 6
- Draws: 1

Matt Windle (born 30 September 1990) is an English professional boxer and poet. He is a former Commonwealth light-flyweight champion and three-time Birmingham Poet Laureate.

== Boxing career ==
A professional since 2015, Windle faced Tommy Frank for the vacant British flyweight title at Ponds Forge in Sheffield on 18 September 2021, losing via unanimous decision.

In his next fight, he dropped down a weight division to claim the vacant Commonwealth light-flyweight title by stopping previously unbeaten South African boxer Siphelele Myeza in the 11th round at Premier Banqueting Suite in Burmantofts, Leeds, on 8 October 2022.

Windle challenged Commonwealth flyweight champion Connor Butler at Liverpool Olympia on 9 June 2023, with the vacant European title also on the line. He lost by unanimous decision.

Dropping back down to light-flyweight, he made the first defense of his Commonwealth title against Craig Derbyshire at Lions Centre in George Town, Cayman Islands, on 8 December 2023. Windle took heavy blows throughout the contest and lost when his corner halted the fight at the end of round five to avoid him sustaining further damage.

== Poetry career ==
Windle is a three-time Birmingham Poet Laureate. Using the nickname Poet with a Punch, he has written poems for the 2022 Commonwealth Games opening ceremony, the World Badminton Championships and the BBC. Windle also teaches poetry and creative writing in schools.
