= Connor Butler =

English boxer (born 1998)

Personal information
- Nickname: Topdog
- Born: 12 February 1998 (age 28) London, England
- Height: 5 ft 3 in (160 cm)
- Weight: Flyweight

Boxing career
- Stance: Orthodox

Boxing record
- Total fights: 14
- Wins: 12
- Win by KO: 1
- Losses: 1
- Draws: 1

Connor Butler (born 12 February 1998) is an English professional boxer who is a former European and Commonwealth flyweight champion.

== Career ==
A professional since 2018, Butler faced Craig Derbyshire for the vacant Commonwealth flyweight title at the Hilton Hotel Portamaso in St. Julian's, Malta on 25 February 2023. He won via unanimous decision.

He made the first defense of his championship against Matt Windle at Liverpool Olympia on 9 June 2023, with the vacant European flyweight title also on the line, winning the fight by unanimous decision.

Returning to the same venue for his next contest on 24 February 2024, Butler took on British flyweight champion Jay Harris, losing via unanimous decision to suffer his first professional defeat.
