= Ross Murray =

Ross Murray may refer to:

- Ross Murray (athlete)
- Ross Murray (boxer)
- Ross Murray (golfer)
