= Joe Maphosa =

British boxer

Personal information
- Nickname: Smokin' Joe
- Nationality: Zimbabwean; British
- Born: 7 April 1994 (age 32) Beitbridge, Matabeleland South, Zimbabwe
- Height: 5 ft 4 in (163 cm)
- Weight: Flyweight; Super-flyweight

Boxing career
- Stance: Orthodox

Boxing record
- Total fights: 13
- Wins: 12
- Win by KO: 1
- Losses: 1

Joseph Maphosa (born 7 April 1994) is a Zimbabwe-born British professional boxer.

== Early life ==
Joseph Maphosa was born on 7 April 1994 in Beitbridge, Zimbabwe, where he grew up with his parents and two brothers. When Maphosa was 9, his father, a mathematics teacher and part-time accountant, emigrated to the U.K. in an attempt to find work. He had a wife and three sons. His father eventually settled in Middlesbrough, England, and after saving up enough money Joe and his two brothers flew to England to join his father. He attended St. Pius X primary school in Middlesbrough where he gained an interest in cricket. His interest in boxing came after watching Bernard Hopkins box Antwun Echols on TV, saying, "I enjoyed playing cricket and running around in the playground at school, but then I saw a clip of Bernard Hopkins on TV and I liked what he was doing so I decided to get myself to a Boxercise class for general fitness to begin with but and that led onto me going to Middlesbrough ABC and from there I have never looked back."

== Amateur career ==
In an amateur career that spanned 75 fights with approximately 60 wins, Maphosa reached the finals of two ABA Championships; in 2012 he was defeated by Reece Bellotti in the bantamweight final and fell short against Sunny Edwards in the 2015 light-flyweight final. He also competed for the British Lionhearts at the 2015 World Series of Boxing, losing a split decision to Cuban Domadores' Joahnys Argilagos at the York Hall in London.

== Professional career ==
Signed with Frank Warren's Queensberry Promotions, Maphosa made his professional debut on 13 May 2017, scoring a four-round points decision (PTS) victory over Gary Reeve at the First Direct Arena in Leeds, England.

Following four consecutive wins, he scored his first stoppage victory on 28 April 2018 at the Temple Park Leisure Centre in South Shields, stopping Steven Maguire via technical knockout (TKO) in the fourth and final round.

== Professional boxing record ==
10 fights	10 wins	0 losses
By knockout	1	0
By decision	9	0

No.	Result	Record	Opponent	Type	Round, time	Date	Location	Notes
10	Win	10–0	(Nicaragua) Moises Mojica	PTS	6	29 Feb 2020	(United Kingdom) Eagles Community Arena, Newcastle, England	
9	Win	9–0	(Lithuania) Marius Vysniauskas	PTS	8	13 Dec 2019	(United Kingdom) Rainton Meadows Arena, Houghton-le-Spring, England	
8	Win	8–0	(United Kingdom) Louis Norman	PTS	6	16 Mar 2019	(United Kingdom) Rainton Meadows Arena, Houghton-le-Spring, England	
7	Win	7–0	(United Kingdom) Steven Maguire	PTS	4	24 Nov 2018	(United Kingdom) Lancastrian Suite, Dunston, England	
6	Win	6–0	(Hungary) Gyula Dodu	PTS	4	6 Oct 2018	(United Kingdom) Morningside Arena, Leicester, England	
5	Win	5–0	(United Kingdom) Steven Maguire	TKO	4 (4), 2:50	28 Apr 2018	(United Kingdom) Temple Park Leisure Centre, South Shields, England	
4	Win	4–0	(United Kingdom) Gary Reeve	PTS	4	10 Mar 2018	(United Kingdom) Rainton Meadows Arena, Houghton-le-Spring, England	
3	Win	3–0	(United Kingdom) Craig Derbyshire	PTS	4	11 Nov 2017	(United Kingdom) Metro Radio Arena, Newcastle, England	
2	Win	2–0	(United Kingdom) Anwar Alfadli	PTS	4	17 Sep 2017	(United Kingdom) St James' Park, Newcastle, England	
1	Win	1–0	(United Kingdom) Gary Reeve	PTS	4	13 May 2017	(United Kingdom) First Direct Arena, Leeds, England	
