= Marcel Braithwaite =

English boxer (born 1994)

Personal information
- Nickname: The Chosen One
- Born: 3 May 1994 (age 32) Liverpool, England
- Height: 5 ft 2 in (157 cm)
- Weight: Super-flyweight

Boxing career
- Stance: Orthodox

Boxing record
- Total fights: 22
- Wins: 17
- Win by KO: 2
- Losses: 4
- Draws: 1

Marcel Braithwaite (born 3 May 1994) is an English professional boxer who is a former British and Commonwealth super-flyweight champion. He has also held the English and WBC International Silver titles in the same weight division.

== Career ==
A professional since 2016, Braithwaite became the English super-flyweight champion with a majority decision win over defending champion Craig Derbyshire at the Bonus Arena in Hull on 26 October 2019. Two of the ringside judges scored the fight 97–93 and 96–94 respectively in his favour, while the third had it a 95–95 draw.

In his next outing, he took on Sunny Edwards for the vacant British super-flyweight title at the Copper Box Arena in London on 21 December 2019. Despite knocking his opponent to the canvas in the seventh round, Braithwaite lost via unanimous decision.

On 26 February 2022, it was Braithwaite who survived a knockdown to win as he climbed off the canvas in the fourth round to secure a unanimous decision victory and claim the vacant WBC International Silver super-flyweight title against Scott Allan at Grand Central Hall in Liverpool.

Just over a year later, on 17 March 2023, he faced Ijaz Ahmed for the vacant British and Commonwealth super-flyweight titles. Held at the Town Hall in Dudley, the fight ended in a split draw with one judge favouring each boxer and the third seeing the contest as a tie.

Braithwaite got a second chance at the Commonwealth belt in his next bout and this time took full advantage as he secured a unanimous decision success over Ryan Farrag at Liverpool Olympia on 9 June 2023.

His first defense was a rematch with Ijaz Ahmed at the Holiday Inn in Birmingham on 20 October 2023, with the vacant British super-flyweight title also on the line. Braithwaite knocked his opponent to the canvas twice in the ninth round before the referee stepped in to stop the fight.

Next, Braithwaite challenged IBO champion Ricardo Malajika at Emperors Palace in Kempton Park, South Africa, on 5 April 2024, losing by unanimous decision.

== Professional boxing record ==
22 fights	17 wins	4 losses
By knockout	2	0
By decision	15	4
Draws	1	

No.	Result	Record	Opponent	Type	Round, time	Date	Location	Notes
22	Win	17–4–1	Komgrich Nantapech	KO	1 (6), 0:58	6 Sep 2024	Hilton Al Habtoor City, Dubai, United Arab Emirates	
21	Loss	16–4–1	Ricardo Malajika	UD	12	5 Apr 2024	Emperors Palace, Kempton Park, South Africa	For IBO super-flyweight title
20	Win	16–3–1	Ijaz Ahmed	TKO	9 (12), 1:37	20 Oct 2023	Holiday Inn, Birmingham, England	Retained Commonwealth super-flyweight title; Won vacant British super-flyweight title
19	Win	15–3–1	Ryan Farrag	UD	12	9 Jun 2023	Olympia, Liverpool, England	Won vacant Commonwealth super-flyweight title
18	Draw	14–3–1	Ijaz Ahmed	SD	12	17 Mar 2023	Town Hall, Dudley, England	For vacant British and Commonwealth super-flyweight title
17	Win	14–3	Thomas Essomba	SD	12	11 Nov 2022	Sheffield Arena, Sheffield, England	Braithwaite missed weight and was ineligible for the British super-flyweight title eliminator
16	Win	13–3	Steven Maguire	PTS	6	2 Sep 2022	Shankly Hotel, Liverpool, England	
15	Win	12–3	Scott Alan	UD	10	26 Feb 2022	Grand Central Hall, Liverpool, England	Won vacant WBC International Silver super-flyweight title
14	Win	11–3	Brett Fidoe	PTS	6	11 Dec 2021	Victoria Warehouse, Manchester, England	
13	Win	10–3	Taka Bembere	PTS	4	4 Sep 2021	Grand Central Hall, Liverpool, England	
12	Loss	9–3	Jay Harris	UD	10	18 Oct 2020	Production Park Studios, South Kirkby, England	
11	Loss	9–2	Sunny Edwards	UD	12	21 Dec 2019	Copper Box Arena, London, England	For vacant British super-flyweight title
10	Win	9–1	Craig Derbyshire	MD	10	26 Oct 2019	Bonus Arena, Kingston upon Hull, England	Won English super-flyweight title
9	Win	8–1	Jake Pollard	PTS	6	25 May 2019	Victoria Warehouse, Manchester, England	
8	Loss	7–1	Brett Fidoe	PTS	6	29 Sep 2018	Olympia, Liverpool, England	
7	Win	7–0	Edward Björklund	PTS	4	12 May 2018	BT Convention Centre, Liverpool, England	
6	Win	6–0	Brett Fidoe	PTS	6	10 Mar 2018	BT Convention Centre, Liverpool, England	
5	Win	5–0	Reynaldo Cajina	PTS	4	4 Nov 2017	Bowlers Exhibition Centre, Manchester, England	
4	Win	4–0	Luke Fash	PTS	4	29 Jul 2017	Bowlers Exhibition Centre, Manchester, England	
3	Win	3–0	Jules Phillips	PTS	4	17 Feb 2017	Fusion Nightclub, Liverpool, England	
2	Win	2–0	Craig Derbyshire	PTS	4	17 Dec 2016	Newcastle Racecourse, Newcastle upon Tyne, England	
1	Win	1–0	Anwar Alfadli	PTS	4	26 Nov 2016	Fusion Nightclub, Liverpool, England	

== Criminal convictions ==
Braithwaite was convicted of reckless assault and criminal damage in July 2020. He was sentenced to a 12-month community order including 20 days of rehabilitation activity requirements and 180 hours of unpaid work as well as being told to pay the victim, who was his girlfriend at the time of the offences, £1,500 in compensation. Braithwaite was also made the subject of a restraining order barring him from contacting the victim or attending her address.

== Personal life ==
Away from boxing, Braithwaite is a community youth worker.
