= Shabaz Masoud =

British boxer (born 1996)

Personal information
- Nickname: Maverick
- Born: 4 March 1996 (age 30) Rochdale, Greater Manchester, England
- Height: 1.70 m (5 ft 7 in)
- Weight: Super-bantamweight

Boxing career
- Reach: 180 cm (71 in)
- Stance: Orthodox

Boxing record
- Total fights: 16
- Wins: 16
- Win by KO: 4

Shabaz Masoud (born 4 March 1996) is a British-Pakistani professional boxer. He has held the IBO super-bantamweight title since November 2024 and the European super-bantamweight title since December 2025.

== Early life ==
Masoud was born in Rochdale, Greater Manchester, England to British-Pakistani parents on 4 March 1996. He later moved to Stoke-on-Trent, Staffordshire. He attended Staffordshire University, but left his studies to pursue a full-time boxing career.

== Professional career ==
=== Early career ===
Masoud made his professional debut against Bulgarian boxer, Stefan Sashev, whom he defeated, on 12 May 2018 at the Bolton Whites Hotel in Bolton. He improved his record to 5 wins and no losses before capturing attention from hall of fame promoter Frank Warren, who signed Masoud to his Queensberry Promotions. Masoud was excited at being promoted by Warren, saying, "You know what, I'm just buzzing to be signed by Frank because I know he is the world's best promoter right now, I personally believe. The way he builds fighters, I know he will build me into a big champion. There are so many he has guided to the top, especially my favourite fighters. For example, Joe Calzaghe, I know he had a lot to do with Joe, and my favourite fighter of all time was Prince Naseem Hamed." Masoud continued to win. In his seventh fight, he won a unanimous decision against Romania’s Stefan Nicolae on 30 November 2019.

=== Super bantamweight ===
Masoud did not fight in 2020, like most boxers, due to COVID restrictions. He did however sign a contract to be co-managed by Ben Davison of MTK Global, alongside his existing manager Mervyn Turner. Masoud scored on his second stoppage win on 19 March 2021 against former English flyweight champion Louis Norman. A series of quick body shots and straight left punches led to Masoud knocking Norman down four times, prompting the referee to stop the fight. It was Masoud's first fight in 16 months. He was next scheduled to fight on a MTK Global card at the York Hall in London on 29 October 2021. His opponent was former British and Commonwealth title challenger James Beech Jr. (13–2, 2 KOs), which was expected to be his most challenging fight to date. On 15 October, the fight was cancelled following Beech's positive COVID-19 test. Four days later, it was announced that he would be competing on the Newcastle show as the co-main event on November 13, 2021, facing off against Diego Alberto Ruiz (23–3, 12 KOs) in a more challenging matchup. Ruiz was known to British fans, having fought Michael Conlan in 2019. During fight week, Thomas Patrick Ward suffered an injury and was forced to withdraw from the card, pushing Masoud to headline his first card. Masoud was thrilled to be part of the main event and believed it would motivate him to perform even better in the fight. The card took place at Rainton Meadows Arena in Houghton-le-Spring. Masoud achieved the most significant victory of his career at the time, by claiming a commanding points win against Ruiz. Masoud dominated throughout the fight which showed on the referee's scorecard, which he scored 99–91 in favour of Masoud.

On 9 February 2022, it was announced that Masoud had entered into a promotional agreement with Probellum, led by Richard Schiefer. After signing the deal, he said, "I'm truly honoured to be signing with Probellum. I have been waiting for an opportunity like this for a while and now it is finally here. I truly believe that I have what it takes to go all the way to the top, and with Probellum now on board, the sky is the limit." The decision was made to boost his boxing career by securing improved promotional backing and expanding his opportunities. His debut was set to take place over 10-rounds on 19 March against French boxer Yoann Boyeaux (43–6, 26 KOs) in Dubai. Boyeaux gained recognition among international fans after facing Naoya Inoue in 2017, where he was defeated in the third round. Masoud aimed to stop him earlier. Both weighed in the same 135.7 pounds. Masoud did what he said and stopped Boyeaux after two rounds. Masoud displayed a complete lack of respect for Boyeaux as he unleashed a series of powerful punches. Midway through the second round, Boyeaux was shaken but managed to stay on his feet, avoiding an official knockdown by holding onto Masoud, which caused both fighters to tumble to the canvas. Boyeaux failed to come out for the third round.

==== Rise up the ranks ====
On 16 September, it was announced that Masoud would face Jack Bateson (17–0, 4 KOs) for the WBA Intercontinental super bantamweight title on 11 November 2022. Subsequently, it was confirmed that the event would be held at Utilita Arena in Sheffield, with the bout against Bateson serving as a British title eliminator. The Ali Tazeem Trophy was established by Probellum as an annual award to pay tribute to the late young British boxing talent, Ali Tazeem. The trophy was to be presented to the winner of a high-profile domestic boxing fight. The bout between Masoud and Bateson was selected for the recipient of this honour. Bateson could not understand why Masoud was the bookies favourite heading into their fight. Masoud stopped Bateson in the twelfth round, in what was described as a brilliant fight, to claim the WBA Intercontinental title and a step closer to the British title. Masoud outclassed Bateson in their bout, showcasing superior technique throughout the match before unleashing his power and securing a stoppage in the final round. In the final round, a left hook sent Bateson to the canvas. Although he managed to get up, he was dropped again, this time ruled as a slip. Unable to defend himself, Bateson was subjected to a flurry of punches from Masoud until referee Howard Foster intervened. By the time the fight was halted, Bateson had once again collapsed to the canvas. After the fight, Masoud stated he next wanted to fight in Stoke.

On 30 June 2023, Masoud signed a multi-fight promotional agreement with Eddie Hearn's Matchroom Boxing. The deal was finalized after extensive negotiations. By joining Matchroom, Masoud ensured that his upcoming fights would be aired on DAZN. Hearn labelled Masoud as 'one of the brightest Super-Bantamweight contenders in Britain' and trainer Ben Davison expressed his enthusiasm about the new collaboration. Masoud is optimistic that this partnership will help him achieve his goal of becoming a world champion.

Masoud's first fight under Matchroom took place on 11 November 2023, on a NextGen card in Newcastle. His opponent was Jose Sanmartin (34–7, 21 KOs). The fight was originally scheduled to take place three weeks prior on the Jack Catterall-Jorge Linares undercard from M&S Bank Arena in Liverpool, however Masoud became ill after the weigh in and the fight was called off. Sanmartin had lost two of his last three fights. The fight was closely contested and went the 10-round distance. Masoud won the fight via split decision and claimed the WBA intercontinental title. The fight was one of the most thrilling fights of the night, and provided a significant challenge for Masoud. Sanmartin gave it his all in the ring and put up an impressive fight, but ultimately, it wasn't sufficient to secure a victory on the scorecards, which read 98–92, 96–94 and 94–96.

==== Masoud vs. Davies ====
In May 2024, Frank Warren announced a 'Magnificent 7' to take place at Resorts World Arena in Birmingham on 20 July with Masoud challenging Liam Davies (17–0, 8 KOs) for his IBO super-bantamweight title. Warren hyped the bout as a "cracking domestic scrap". Four weeks prior to the event, the fight was postponed due to Davies contracting a virus that rendered him unfit to compete. Tristan Davies, Davies' father and trainer, emphasized that the illness was real and condemned the "disrespectful" responses on social media that accused Liam of dodging the fight. Masoud still fought on the same card, outpointing Marvin Solano in an eight-round featherweight contest, while the fight with Davies was expected to happen later in the year. Following Masoud's win over Solano, he and Davies had a heated confrontation. The two had history as Masoud had two wins over Davies in the amateurs. Davies was confident in his punching power and considered himself the superior boxer.

The bout between Masoud and Davies was rescheduled to take place on 2 November 2024 at BP Pulse Live in Birmingham. Davies weighed 121.6 pounds and Masoud came in at 121.9 pounds. On the night, Masoud defeated Davies, winning by split decision after 12 competitive rounds. The fight started with Masoud displaying his boxing skills, landing precise jabs and controlling the distance. As the rounds continued, Davies tried to increase the pressure, but he frequently found himself caught by Masoud's counter-strategies. Although he had a few successful moments, Davies faced difficulty in establishing his rhythm. In the fourth round, Davies sustained a cut near his right eye. In the later rounds, Davies demonstrated great determination, however Masoud consistently delivered sharper punches. By the end of the bout, Masoud had proven himself to be a technically proficient fighter. The scorecards read 116–112 and 115–113 in favour of Masoud, while one judge scored it 115–113 for Davies. After the fight, both boxers showed mutual respect, acknowledging each other's performances. Masoud was highly praised after the fight.

==== Masoud vs. McGrail ====
Masoud was scheduled to defend his IBO title against Peter McGrail in Birmingham, England, on 21 June 2025. On 4 June, it was revealed that Masoud had suffered an injury in training which would rule him out of the fight. The matchmakers at Matchroom Boxing brought in Romanian boxer Ionut Baluta as a replacement to fight McGrail. On 14 October, Matchroom Boxing announced that the fight was rescheduled to headline Monte Carlo Showdown VI on 6 December, at the Salle Des Étoiles in Monaco, for the IBO and EBU European super bantamweight titles. Despite the fight being billed as a world title fight, the IBO had not approved the bout. They clarified via social media, “The IBO has not agreed to this. We will not permit a World Title with a Regional title (European)." Masoud weighed 121.9 pounds and McGrail came in at 121.7 pounds, both below the limit.

Masoud won a closely contested unanimous decision. In the first four rounds, McGrail maintained a dominant performance. However, in the fifth and sixth rounds, Masoud rebounded by effectively using his jab to take those rounds. The seventh round was competitive. In the eighth and ninth rounds, Masoud seemed to have the upper hand, often targeting McGrail's body and landing significant left uppercuts. During the tenth round, Masoud expressed concerns about a punch to the back of his head, leading referee Giuseppe Quartarone to deduct a point from McGrail. In the next round, McGrail regained a slight edge, while Masoud continued to seek another point deduction, holding the back of his head. In the final rounds, Masoud managed the fight carefully, clinching and using judicious counters to maintain his lead, while McGrail pressed forward but landed less cleanly The scores were 116-111, 115-112, and 114-113 in favour of Masoud. After the fight, Masoud expressed his ambitions for a world title shot, indicating a potential move up in weight class due to difficulties in making the super-bantamweight limit. He specifically mentioned his interest in fighting Nick Ball, the WBA featherweight champion.

=== Featherweight ===
==== Masoud vs. Mansilla ====
On 3 August 2026, Masoud was added to the Co-op Live card in Manchester, headlined by John Hedges and Pat Brown. The card was scheduled to take place on 19 September. Masoud moved up to featherweight to fight Argentine Ckari Mansilla (19–4, 13 KOs) for the vacant IBF Intercontinental and WBA International titles. Masoud delivered a commanding performance, showing good technique and tactics. He remained undefeated, controlling every round and winning a unanimous decision with a clean 100–90 scorecard from all judges. He used a sharp, accurate jab to control the range from the opening bell, which prevented Mansilla from closing the distance effectively.

== Professional boxing record ==
16 fights	16 wins	0 losses
By knockout	4	0
By decision	12	0

No.	Result	Record	Opponent	Type	Round, Time	Date	Location	Notes
16	Win	16–0	Ckari Cani Mansilla	UD	10	19 Sep 2026	Co-op Live, Manchester, England	Won vacant WBA International and IBF Inter-Continental featherweight titles
15	Win	15–0	Peter McGrail	UD	12	6 Dec 2025	Salle des Etoiles, Monte Carlo, Monaco	Won vacant European super-bantamweight title
14	Win	14–0	Liam Davies	SD	12	2 Nov 2024	Resorts World Birmingham, Birmingham, England	Won IBO super bantamweight title
13	Win	13–0	Marvin Solano	UD	8	20 Jul 2024	Resorts World Birmingham, Birmingham, England	
12	Win	12–0	Jose Sanmartin	SD	10	11 Nov 2023	Newcastle Arena, Newcastle upon Tyne, England	Won vacant WBA Inter-Continental super bantamweight title
11	Win	11–0	Jack Bateson	TKO	12 (12), 2:00	11 Nov 2022	Utilita Arena Sheffield, Sheffield, England	Won WBA Inter-Continental super bantamweight title
10	Win	10–0	Yoan Boyeaux	RTD	2 (10), 3:00	18 Mar 2022	Duty Free Tennis Stadium, Dubai, United Arab Emirates	
9	Win	9–0	Diego Alberto Ruiz	PTS	10	13 Nov 2021	Rainton Meadows Arena, Houghton-le-Spring, England	
8	Win	8–0	Louis Norman	TKO	4 (6), 1:12	19 Mar 2021	Bolton Whites Hotel (De Vere Whites), Bolton, England	
7	Win	7–0	Stefan Nicolae	PTS	6	30 Nov 2019	Utilita Arena, Birmingham, England	
6	Win	6–0	Yesner Talavera	PTS	6	12 Oct 2019	First Direct Arena, Leeds, England	
5	Win	5–0	Brayan Mairena	PTS	6	4 May 2019	Holte Suite, Villa Park, Birmingham, England	
4	Win	4–0	Jose Hernandez	PTS	4	30 Mar 2019	King's Hall, Stoke-on-Trent, England	
3	Win	3–0	Cristian Narvaez	PTS	4	26 Oct 2018	Middleton Arena, Middleton, England	
2	Win	2–0	Johnson Tellez	PTS	4	28 Jul 2018	Middleton Arena, Middleton, England	
1	Win	1–0	Stefan Sashev	TKO	3 (4), 1:51	12 May 2018	Bolton Whites Hotel (De Vere Whites), Bolton, England	
