= Jay Harris (boxer) =

Welsh boxer (born 1990)

Personal information
- Born: 25 August 1990 (age 36) Swansea, Wales
- Height: 5 ft 5 in (165 cm)
- Weight: Light-flyweight; Flyweight; Super-flyweight

Boxing career
- Stance: Orthodox

Boxing record
- Total fights: 24
- Wins: 21
- Win by KO: 11
- Losses: 3

Jay Harris (born 25 August 1990) is a Welsh former professional boxer. He twice held the European flyweight title as well as being British and Commonwealth champion. Harris also challenged for the World Boxing Council (WBC) flyweight title in 2020.

== Early life ==
Harris was born on 25 August 1990 in Swansea, growing up in the Townhill area of the city. He is the son of former British featherweight champion, Peter Harris, who is also his trainer. Harris began boxing at the age of 12 after going to the gym with a friend. Alongside boxing, he works part-time at Amazon.

== Professional career ==
Harris made his professional debut on 27 July 2013 at the Newport Centre, Wales, scoring a four-round points decision (PTS) victory over Brett Fidoe.

After compiling a record of 9–0 (6 KO), he challenged Thomas Essomba for the Commonwealth flyweight title on 24 February 2017 at the York Hall, London. The fight was televised live on BoxNation, with Harris winning via unanimous decision (UD) over twelve rounds. The judges' scorecards read 117–112, 116–113 and 115–114. Following three more wins, one by knockout (KO), he made the first defence of his Commonwealth title against Ross Murray on 3 November 2018 at the York Hall. Harris successfully retained his title with a third-round technical knockout (TKO).

After a six-round PTS win over Brett Fidoe in March 2019, he next fought former world title challenger Angel Moreno on 1 June at the Vale Sports Arena in Cardiff, with the vacant European flyweight title on the line. All three judges scored the bout in favour of Harris, with the scorecards reading 120–108, 119–109 and 117–111, awarding Harris the European title via UD.

Four months later, he faced two-time Olympic bronze medalist and former world title challenger Paddy Barnes on 11 October at the Ulster Hall, Belfast, for the vacant IBF Inter-Continental flyweight title. The fight was streamed live on ESPN+ in the United States and globally through YouTube channel iFL TV, with Harris capturing his third professional title with a fourth-round KO. Harris, being the bigger of the two, used the height and reach difference to his advantage, boxing at range with sharp jabs and straight right hands. In the final 60 seconds of round one, Harris landed a straight right hand to stun Barnes and send the former three-time Olympian reeling into the ropes. After a follow-up attack by Harris, Barnes fired back with a rapid ten punch combination, all of which were taken on the gloves by Harris. Round two saw much of the same, Harris staying at range, continuing to land jabs and straight right hands to the head with Barnes having little success. The third was an action packed round. With Harris electing to fight at close quarters, Barnes began finding the target with hooks to the head and body, opening a cut above Harris' right eye. In the final minute of the round, Harris landed a left hook to the body that dropped Barnes to undo the Irishman's previous success. He raised to his feet before the referee's count of ten to see out the remainder of the round. The end came in the round four. With Harris going back to fighting at range, Barnes took punishment throughout, finally being dropped with a left hook to the midsection. Unable to beat the count of ten, the fight was stopped with 48 seconds remaining.

Harris was scheduled to challenge the WBC flyweight champion Julio Cesar Martinez on 29 February 2020, at The Ford Center at The Star in Frisco, Texas, United States, his first fight outside of the British Isles. Martinez justified his role as the 7/1 favorite, beating Harris by unanimous decision, with scores of 118–109, 116–111, and 115–112. Harris suffered a cut above his left eye in the second round, and was knocked down in the tenth round.

Harris faced the former British and English flyweight champion Marcel Braithwaite on 18 October 2020, at the Production Park Studios in South Kirkby. Harris won the fight by a dominant unanimous decision, with scores of 98–92, 98-93 and 97–93. After successfully rebounding from his first professional loss, Harris was scheduled to face Ricardo Rafael Sandoval in an IBF flyweight title eliminator, in the main event of a DAZN card, on 25 June 2021. Although he entered the bout as a slight betting favorite, Harris lost the fight by an eight-round knockout. Harris was knocked down twice in the eight round, both time with body strikes, with Harris failing to rise in time to beat the eight count following the second knockdown.

Harris faced the undefeated Hector Gabriel Flores for the vacant WBA Inter-Continental light-flyweight title on 26 November 2021, in the main event of an MTF Fight Night event. Harris lost the fight by a sixth-round knockout. Just as in his previous bout, he was dropped twice with body strikes, and failed to beat the count after the second knockdown.

On 5 May 2023, Harris challenged British flyweight champion Tommy Frank at Magna Centre in Rotherham, winning by technical knockout in the 10th round.

He successfully defended the title against Connor Butler at Olympia in Liverpool on 24 February 2024, winning via unanimous and taking his opponent's European and Commonwealth flyweight championships in the process.

Harris announced his retirement from professional boxing on 11 February 2025.

== Professional boxing record ==
24 fights	21 wins	3 losses
By knockout	11	2
By decision	10	1

No.	Result	Record	Opponent	Type	Round, time	Date	Location	Notes
24	Win	21–3	Connor Butler	UD	12	24 Feb 2024	Olympia, Liverpool, England	Retained British flyweight title; won European and Commonwealth flyweight titles
23	Win	20–3	Tommy Frank	TKO	10 (12), 1:33	5 May 2023	Magna Centre, Rotherham, England	Won British flyweight title
22	Win	19–3	Alejandro Torres	TKO	4 (6), 0:55	11 Jun 2022	Ware-House Gym, Swansea, Wales	
21	Loss	18–3	Hector Gabriel Flores	KO	6 (10), 1:32	26 Nov 2021	Vale Sports Arena, Cardiff, Wales	For WBA Inter-Continental light-flyweight title
20	Loss	18–2	Ricardo Rafael Sandoval	KO	8 (12), 2:12	25 Jun 2021	Bolton Whites Hotel, Bolton, England	
19	Win	18–1	Marcel Braithwaite	UD	10	18 Oct 2020	Production Park Studios, South Kirkby, England	
18	Loss	17–1	Julio Cesar Martinez	UD	12	29 Feb 2020	The Ford Center at The Star, Frisco, Texas, US	For WBC flyweight title
17	Win	17–0	Paddy Barnes	KO	4 (10), 2:14	11 Oct 2019	Ulster Hall, Belfast, Northern Ireland	Won vacant IBF Inter-Continental flyweight title
16	Win	16–0	Angel Moreno	UD	12	1 Jun 2019	Vale Sports Arena, Cardiff, Wales	Won vacant European flyweight title
15	Win	15–0	Brett Fidoe	PTS	6	1 Mar 2019	Vale Sports Arena, Cardiff, Wales	
14	Win	14–0	Ross Murray	TKO	3 (12), 2:48	3 Nov 2018	York Hall, London, England	Retained Commonwealth flyweight title
13	Win	13–0	Cristian Narvaez	PTS	6	11 Aug 2018	Llandarcy Academy of Sport, Neath, Wales	
12	Win	12–0	Gyula Dodu	KO	2 (8), 0:29	13 Nov 2017	Hilton Hotel, London, England	
11	Win	11–0	Michael Barnor	PTS	6	22 Jul 2017	LC2, Swansea, Wales	
10	Win	10–0	Thomas Essomba	UD	12	24 Feb 2017	York Hall, London, England	Won Commonwealth flyweight title
9	Win	9–0	Phil Smith	TKO	4 (6), 2:04	26 Nov 2016	Motorpoint Arena, Cardiff, Wales	
8	Win	8–0	Ramesh Ahmadi	KO	3 (8), 0:55	16 Jul 2016	Ice Arena Wales, Cardiff, Wales	
7	Win	7–0	David Koos	TKO	3 (6)	23 Nov 2015	Hilton Hotel, London, England	
6	Win	6–0	Tibor Nadori	KO	1 (6), 1:35	17 Jul 2015	York Hall, London, England	
5	Win	5–0	Stefan Slavchev	TKO	3 (6), 2:29	14 Feb 2015	Civic Hall, Wolverhampton, England	
4	Win	4–0	Francis Croes	KO	4 (6), 1:33	27 Oct 2014	Royal Lancaster Hotel, London, England	
3	Win	3–0	Ricky Leach	PTS	4	1 Aug 2014	Civic Hall, Wolverhampton, England	
2	Win	2–0	Gary Reeve	PTS	4	29 Mar 2014	Metro Radio Arena, Newcastle, England	
1	Win	1–0	Brett Fidoe	PTS	4	27 Jul 2013	Newport Centre, Newport, Wales	

Sporting positions
Regional boxing titles
Preceded by Thomas Essomba	Commonwealth flyweight champion 24 February 2017 – present	Incumbent
Vacant Title last held by Vincent Legrand	European flyweight champion 1 June 2019 – present	Incumbent
Vacant Title last held by Andrew Selby	IBF Inter-Continental flyweight champion 11 October 2019 – present	Incumbent
