= Thomas Essomba =

Cameroonian boxer (born 1987)

Personal information
- Nationality: British; Cameroonian
- Born: 2 December 1987 (age 38) Yaounde, Cameroon
- Height: 5 ft 4 in (1.63 m)
- Weight: Light-flyweight; Flyweight; Super-flyweight; Bantamweight; Featherweight

Boxing career
- Stance: Southpaw

Boxing record
- Total fights: 26
- Wins: 14
- Win by KO: 4
- Losses: 11
- Draws: 1
Medal record
Men's amateur boxing
Representing Cameroon
All-Africa Games
Gold medal – first place	2011 Maputo	Light-flyweight
Bronze medal – third place	2007 Algiers	Light-flyweight

Thomas Essomba (born 2 December 1987) is a Cameroonian-British former professional boxer who has held the European bantamweight and Commonwealth flyweight titles. As an amateur, he represented Cameroon at the 2012 Olympics, reaching the round of 16 of the light-flyweight bracket.

== Career ==
Essomba fought in two Olympic games for the Cameroon boxing team; at the 2012 Olympics in London, he was captain of the team and reached the last 16 of the light-flyweight division, being defeated by Paddy Barnes. He defected in London, was given political asylum and indefinite leave to remain in the United Kingdom, and became a British citizen soon after. He resettled in Sunderland, where he has trained at the Olympian Gym. In his professional career, he won the Commonwealth flyweight title in October 2015 and the English bantamweight title in March 2018. Essomba retired from boxing in June 2025.

== Achievements ==
- 2019 WBA Continental bantamweight title
- 2018 English bantamweight title
- 2015 Commonwealth flyweight title
- 2015 International Masters Bronze super-flyweight title
- 2012 Second Olympic participation, London, England
- 2012 Cameroon champion, best sportsman, first Cameroon Award.
- 2011 AIBA World Championship ranking: 20
- 2011 African Confederation ranking: 1
- 2009 AIBA World Championship participation in Milan.
- 2008 First Olympic participation, Beijing, China.

== Professional boxing record ==
26 fights	14 wins	11 losses
By knockout	4	2
By decision	10	9
Draws	1	

No.	Result	Record	Opponent	Type	Round, time	Date	Location	Notes
26	Loss	14–11–1	Masood Abdulah	TKO	10 (10)	13 Feb 2026	Rival Boxing Gym, Marbella, Spain	For vacant IBO International featherweight title
25	Loss	14–10–1	Rhys Edwards	PTS	8	7 Jun 2025	Oakwell, Barnsley, England	
24	Win	14–9–1	Sean Jackson	PTS	4	9 Feb 2025	Brentwood Centre, Brentwood, England	
23	Loss	13–9–1	Charlie Edwards	UD	12	27 Sep 2024	York Hall, London, England	Lost the European bantamweight title
22	Win	13–8–1	Elie Konki	SD	12	9 Feb 2024	Park Community Arena, Sheffield, England	
21	Win	12–8–1	Alessio Lorusso	UD	12	20 May 2023	Monza, Lombardia, Italy	Won European bantamweight title
20	Loss	11–8–1	Marcel Braithwaite	SD	12	11 Nov 2022	Sheffield Arena, Sheffield, England	
19	Win	11–7–1	Michael Nielsen	UD	8	9 April 2022	Graakjaer, Holstebro, Denmark	
18	Loss	10–7–1	Marc Leach	UD	12	5 Jun 2021	Sheffield Arena Car Park, Sheffield, England	
17	Draw	10–6–1	Thomas Patrick Ward	TD	8 (10), 3:00	17 Oct 2020	East of England Arena, Peterborough, England	Split TD after Ward cut from accidental head clash
16	Loss	10–6	Sunny Edwards	UD	12	29 Aug 2020	BT Sport Studio, London, England	For IBF International super-flyweight title
15	Win	10–5	Islander Kharsan	TKO	3 (8), 1:24	16 Dec 2019	Baluan Sholak Sports Palace, Almaty, Kazakhstan	
14	Win	9–5	Sean McGoldrick	UD	10	2 Aug 2019	Exhibition Centre, Liverpool, England	Won vacant WBA Continental bantamweight title
13	Loss	8–5	Lee McGregor	KO	12 (12), 1:38	13 Oct 2018	York Hall, London, England	For vacant Commonwealth bantamweight title
12	Loss	8–4	Kyle Williams	SD	10	9 Jun 2018	Willows Banqueting Suite, Willenhall, England	Lost English bantamweight title
11	Win	8–3	Louis Norman	KO	6 (10), 1:06	2 Mar 2018	King Power Stadium, Leicester, England	Won vacant English bantamweight title
10	Loss	7–3	Jay Harris	UD	12	24 Feb 2017	York Hall, London, England	Lost Commonwealth flyweight title
9	Loss	7–2	Iain Butcher	PTS	10	7 May 2016	Meadowbank Sports Centre, Edinburgh, Scotland	
8	Win	7–1	Sergey Tasimov	PTS	6	5 Mar 2016	Rainton Meadows Arena, Houghton-le-Spring, England	
7	Win	6–1	Waleed Din	TKO	11 (12), 1:20	17 Oct 2015	Magna Centre, Rotherham, England	Won vacant Commonwealth flyweight title
6	Win	5–1	Mikheil Soloninkini	PTS	4	19 Sep 2015	Lancastrian Suite, Dunston, England	
5	Win	4–1	Robert Kanalas	TKO	2 (8), 2:25	5 Jul 2015	Stadium of Light, Sunderland, England	
4	Win	3–1	Isaac Quaye	PTS	8	8 Mar 2015	Rainton Meadows Arena, Houghton-le-Spring, England	
3	Win	2–1	Brett Fidoe	PTS	4	30 Nov 2014	Rainton Meadows Arena, Houghton-le-Spring, England	
2	Win	1–1	Anwar Alfadli	PTS	4	13 Jul 2014	Stadium of Light, Sunderland, England	
1	Loss	0–1	Yoan Boyeaux	PTS	4	7 Nov 2009	Gymnase, Usson-en-Forez, France	

== See also ==
- Cameroon at the 2008 Summer Olympics#Boxing
