= Tommy Frank =

English boxer (born 1993)

Personal information
- Nickname: Super
- Born: 17 July 1993 (age 32) Sheffield, England
- Height: 5 ft 7 in (170 cm)
- Weight: Flyweight; Super-flyweight

Boxing career
- Stance: Orthodox

Boxing record
- Total fights: 20
- Wins: 15
- Win by KO: 3
- Losses: 4
- Draws: 1

Tommy Frank (born 17 July 1993) is an English former professional boxer who held the British flyweight title from 2021 to 2023 and the Commonwealth super-flyweight title from 2019 to 2020.

== Early life ==
Frank was born in Sheffield, Yorkshire. At the age of five, Frank had an operation to repair a hole in his heart and has since been an ambassador for Yorkshire-based national charity Heart Research UK. Frank took up boxing at the age of twelve, compiling an amateur record of 23–22, training at the Sheffield Boxing Centre in Hillsborough under the tutelage of head trainer Glyn Rhodes. After leaving school he studied plumbing at Castle College in Sheffield and worked as a labourer before turning professional.

== Professional career ==
Frank made his professional debut on 30 July 2016, scoring a four-round points decision victory over Sergey Tasimov at the Magna Centre in Rotherham.

After compiling a record of 6–0, he challenged Craig Derbyshire for the Central Area super-flyweight title on 27 April 2018 at the iceSheffield in Yorkshire, winning by points decision over 10 rounds.

Following two more wins, one by stoppage, he was scheduled to face Ross Murray on 15 March 2019 for the vacant Commonwealth super-flyweight title at the Ponds Forge Arena, Sheffield. After Murray withdrew from the bout, his new opponent was announced as Luke Wilton. Frank won the fight via fourth-round technical knockout (TKO). Frank dropped his opponent four times before the stoppage; a little over a minute into the first-round, Wilton was down from a straight right hand. After beating the referee's count of ten Frank unloaded a barrage of punches culminating in a right hook to send Wilton to the canvas for a second time. In the fourth, Frank came out from the opening bell throwing power punches. 10 seconds into the round, while backed up against the ropes, Wilton was caught with a left hook to the body to send him down for the third time. Wilton raised to his feet to beat the count yet again, but came under immediate fire from Frank, who was switching his attacks from head to body, eventually finding his target with a right hook to the midsection to send Wilton down for the fourth and final time. Referee Michael Alexander waved off the fight as Wilton made it to his feet on the count of ten.

Following a seventh-round TKO win over John Chuwa in July, he returned to the Ponds Forge Arena on 20 September 2019, facing Aran Dipaen for the vacant WBC International Silver super-flyweight title. Frank won the title by split decision. In a hard-fought, even contest, two judges' scored the bout 116–113 and 115–113 in favour of Frank, while the third scored it 115–113 to Dipaen.

Frank defeated Matt Windle by unanimous decision to claim the vacant British flyweight title at Ponds Forge Arena in Sheffield on 18 September 2021.

He defended the title against Craig Derbyshire at the Magna Centre in Rotherham on 3 April 2022. The fight ended in a split draw with one ringside judge awarding him the bout 114–112 and a second favouring Derbyshire 114–113, while the third saw it as a 114–114 tie.

At the same venue on 5 May 2023, Frank lost the championship to Jay Harris, going down to a 10th round technical knockout defeat.

In his next fight he faced Galal Yafai for the vacant WBC International flyweight title at Utilita Arena in Birmingham on 19 August 2023. He lost by stoppage in the first round.

Having not fought for 19 months, Frank officially announced his retirement from professional boxing on 18 March 2025.

== Professional boxing record ==
20 fights	15 wins	4 losses
By knockout	3	3
By decision	12	1
Draws	1	

No.	Result	Record	Opponent	Type	Round, time	Date	Location	Notes
20	Loss	15–4–1	Galal Yafai	TKO	1 (10), 1:40	19 Aug 2023	Utilita Arena, Birmingham, England	For the vacant WBC International flyweight title
19	Loss	15–3–1	Jay Harris	TKO	10 (12), 1:33	5 May 2023	Magna Centre, Rotherham, England	Lost British flyweight title
18	Draw	15–2–1	Craig Derbyshire	SD	12	3 Apr 2022	Magna Centre, Rotherham, England	Retained British flyweight title
17	Win	15–2	Charles Tondo	PTS	8	17 Dec 2021	Ponds Forge Arena, Sheffield, England	
16	Win	14–2	Matt Windle	UD	12	18 Sep 2021	Ponds Forge Arena, Sheffield, England	Won vacant British flyweight title
15	Loss	13–2	Rosendo Hugo Guarneros	SD	12	18 Jun 2021	FlyDSA Arena Car Park, Sheffield, England	For IBF Inter-Continental flyweight title
14	Loss	13–1	Rosendo Hugo Guarneros	RTD	8 (12), 3:00	11 Dec 2020	FlyDSA Arena Car Park, Sheffield, England	For vacant IBF Inter-Continental flyweight title
13	Win	13–0	Martin Tecuapetla	UD	10	29 Nov 2019	Ponds Forge Arena, Sheffield, England	Won vacant IBO Inter-Continental flyweight title
12	Win	12–0	Aran Dipaen	SD	12	20 Sep 2019	Ponds Forge Arena, Sheffield, England	Won vacant WBC International Silver super-flyweight title
11	Win	11–0	John Chuwa	TKO	7 (10), 1:47	5 Jul 2019	Ponds Forge Arena, Sheffield, England	
10	Win	10–0	Luke Wilton	TKO	4 (12), 0:50	15 Mar 2019	Ponds Forge Arena, Sheffield, England	Won vacant Commonwealth super-flyweight title
9	Win	9–0	Adam Yahaya	PTS	10	12 Oct 2018	Ponds Forge Arena, Sheffield, England	
8	Win	8–0	Steven Maguire	TKO	4 (6), 2:58	14 Jul 2018	Premier Banqueting Suite, Leeds, England	
7	Win	7–0	Craig Derbyshire	PTS	10	27 Apr 2018	iceSheffield, Sheffield, England	Won Central Area super-flyweight title
6	Win	6–0	Brett Fidoe	PTS	4	13 Dec 2017	DoubleTree by Hilton Hotel, Sheffield, England	
5	Win	5–0	Anwar Alfadli	PTS	4	13 Oct 2017	Ponds Forge Arena, Sheffield, England	
4	Win	4–0	Georgi Andonov	PTS	4	29 Jul 2017	Ponds Forge Arena, Sheffield, England	
3	Win	3–0	Patrik Bartos	PTS	4	24 Mar 2017	Bramall Lane Platinum Suite, Sheffield, England	
2	Win	2–0	Jordan Turner	PTS	4	2 Dec 2016	Bramall Lane Platinum Suite, Sheffield, England	
1	Win	1–0	Sergey Tasimov	PTS	4	30 Jul 2016	Magna Centre, Rotherham, England	

== External list ==
Sporting positions
Regional boxing titles
Preceded by Craig Derbyshire	Central Area super-flyweight champion 27 April 2018 – July 2018; Vacated	Vacant
Vacant Title last held by Andrew Moloney	Commonwealth super-flyweight champion 15 March 2019 – present	Incumbent
Vacant Title last held by Aliu Bamidele Lasisi	WBC International Silver super-flyweight champion 20 September 2019 – present	Incumbent
Vacant Title last held by Makazole Tete	IBO Inter-Continental flyweight champion 29 November 2019 – present	Incumbent
