= Louis Norman =

British boxer (born 1993)

Personal information
- Nickname: 2Sweet
- Nationality: British
- Born: 18 December 1993 (age 32) Leicestershire, England
- Height: 5 ft 5 in (165 cm)
- Weight: Flyweight; Super-flyweight; Bantamweight

Boxing career
- Stance: Orthodox

Boxing record
- Total fights: 24
- Wins: 14
- Win by KO: 2
- Losses: 9
- Draws: 1

Louis Norman (born 18 December 1993) is a British professional boxer who held the English flyweight title from 2013 to 2015. He also challenged for the British flyweight and English super-flyweight titles in 2016 and the English bantamweight title in 2018.

== Career ==
Born in Leicestershire and based in Shepshed, after fighting as an amateur out of Shepshed Amateur Boxing Club, Norman made his professional debut in April 2012, with a points win over Delroy Spencer. After winning his first five fights, including a win over Mohammed Waqas to take the British masters flyweight title, he faced Nathan Reeve in December 2013 for the vacant English flyweight title, winning by unanimous decision. He defended the title in May 2014 against Don Broadhurst, the fight ending a draw, and lost it in September 2015 when he was outpointed by Charlie Edwards on the undercard of Anthony Joshua vs. Gary Cornish. In 2014, he was named Best Young Boxer at the Midlands Boxing Awards.

In May 2016, Norman faced Andrew Selby for the vacant British flyweight title, losing by unanimous decision after struggling to make the weight. He moved up to super flyweight in October 2016 to face Broadhurst for the vacant English title, losing via a split decision. He fought Thomas Essomba for the vacant English bantamweight title in March 2018 but lost to a knockout from a body shot in the 6th round.

== Professional boxing record ==
32 fights	14 wins	17 losses
By knockout	2	7
By decision	12	10
Draws	1	

No.	Result	Record	Opponent	Type	Round, time	Date	Location	Notes
24	Loss	14–9–1	(United Kingdom) Shabaz Masoud	KO	4 (6), 1:12	19 Mar 2021	(United Kingdom) Bolton Whites Hotel, Bolton, England	
23	Loss	14–8–1	(United Kingdom) Chris Bourke	KO	3 (6), 2:46	21 Dec 2019	(United Kingdom) Copper Box Arena, Hackney Wick, England	
22	Win	14–7–1	(Sweden) Edward Bjorklund	PTS	4	2 Nov 2019	(United Kingdom) King Power Stadium, Leicester, England	
21	Loss	13–7–1	(United Kingdom) Joe Maphosa	PTS	6	16 Mar 2019	(United Kingdom) Rainton Meadows Arena, Houghton-le-Spring, England	
20	Loss	13–6–1	(United Kingdom) Marc Leach	TKO	2 (10), 1:40	15 Sep 2018	(United Kingdom) Victoria Warehouse, Manchester, England	
19	Win	13–5–1	(United Kingdom) Jules Phillips	PTS	4	14 Apr 2018	(United Kingdom) King Power Stadium, Leicester, England	
18	Loss	12–5–1	(Cameroon) Thomas Essomba	KO	6 (10), 1:06	2 Mar 2018	(United Kingdom) King Power Stadium, Leicester, England	For vacant English bantamweight title
17	Win	12–4–1	(United Kingdom) George Brennan	PTS	6	9 Sep 2017	(United Kingdom) Braunstone Leisure Centre, Leicester, England	
16	Loss	11–4–1	(United Kingdom) Kyle Yousaf	PTS	6	27 May 2017	(United Kingdom) Bramall Lane, Sheffield, England	
15	Loss	11–3–1	(United Kingdom) Don Broadhurst	SD	10	22 Oct 2016	(United Kingdom) Barclaycard Arena, Birmingham, England	For vacant English super-flyweight title
14	Loss	11–2–1	(United Kingdom) Andrew Selby	UD	12	14 May 2016	(United Kingdom) Ice Arena, Cardiff, Wales	For vacant British flyweight title
13	Win	11–1–1	(United Kingdom) Craig Derbyshire	PTS	4	13 Dec 2015	(United Kingdom) Hermitage Leisure Centre, Whitwick, England	
12	Loss	10–1–1	(United Kingdom) Charlie Edwards	UD	10	12 Sep 2015	(United Kingdom) The O2 Arena, London, England	Lost BBBofC English flyweight title
11	Win	10–0–1	(United Kingdom) Brett Fidoe	PTS	6	25 Jul 2015	(United Kingdom) Derby Arena, Derby, England	
10	Win	9–0–1	(United Kingdom) Ian Halsall	PTS	6	22 Mar 2015	(United Kingdom) iPro Stadium, Derby, England	
9	Win	8–0–1	(Hungary) Csaba Kovacs	PTS	8	28 Sep 2014	(United Kingdom) Hermitage Leisure Centre, Whitwick, England	
8	Draw	7–0–1	(United Kingdom) Don Broadhurst	SD	10	11 May 2014	(United Kingdom) Hermitage Leisure Centre, Whitwick, England	Retained English flyweight title
7	Win	7–0	(Czech Republic) Patrik Bartos	TKO	1 (4), 1:35	2 Mar 2014	(United Kingdom) King Power Stadium, Leicester, England	
6	Win	6–0	(United Kingdom) Nathan Reeve	UD	10	1 Dec 2013	(United Kingdom) Civic Hall, Wolverhampton, England	Won vacant English flyweight title
5	Win	5–0	(Hungary) Peter Mellar	TKO	1 (4), 2:00	12 May 2013	(United Kingdom) Club Republic, Leicester, England	
4	Win	4–0	(United Kingdom) Mohammed Waqas	PTS	10	24 Feb 2013	(United Kingdom) Hermitage Leisure Centre, Whitwick, England	Won British Masters flyweight title
3	Win	3–0	(United Kingdom) Brett Fidoe	PTS	6	11 Nov 2012	(United Kingdom) Hermitage Leisure Centre, Whitwick, England	
2	Win	2–0	(United Kingdom) Delroy Spencer	PTS	4	16 Jun 2012	(United Kingdom) Velodrome, Manchester, England	
1	Win	1–0	(United Kingdom) Delroy Spencer	PTS	4	27 Apr 2012	(United Kingdom) Don Valley Stadium, Sheffield, England	
