= Julio Cesar Martínez =

Mexican boxer (born 1995)

Personal information
- Nickname: El Rey ("The King")
- Born: Julio Cesar Martínez Aguilar; 27 January 1995 (age 31) Mexico City, Mexico
- Height: 5 ft 2 in (157 cm)
- Weight: Flyweight; Super flyweight

Boxing career
- Reach: 63 in (160 cm)
- Stance: Orthodox

Boxing record
- Total fights: 27
- Wins: 20
- Win by KO: 15
- Losses: 4
- No contests: 3

Julio Cesar Martínez Aguilar (born 27 January 1995) is a Mexican professional boxer who held the World Boxing Council (WBC) flyweight title from 2019 to 2024.

== Professional career ==
=== Early career ===
Martínez made his professional debut against Joaquin Cruz on 16 October 2015. He lost the fight by a split decision. He would go on to amass a 13–1 record over the course of his next 13 fights.

Martínez was scheduled to fight Andrew Selby on 23 March 2019, in a WBC flyweight title eliminator to determine the next mandatory challenger. Martínez won the fight by a fifth-round knockout, handing Selby the first loss of his professional career. Selby had a great start to the fight, before a clash of heads in the third round cut him along his left eyebrow, for which Martínez was deducted a point. Martínez enjoyed more success from the third round onward, knocking Selby down with a liver shot 57 seconds into the fifth round.

=== WBC flyweight champion ===
==== Martínez vs. C. Edwards ====
As Martínez had secured his position as the mandatory WBC flyweight title challenger with the fifth-round knockout of Andrew Selby, WBC ordered the reigning flyweight world champion Charlie Edwards to defend his title against Martínez. They were later given a weeklong extension from the sanctioning body to come to terms as regards the purse and venue. The two parties avoided going to a purse bid, agreeing to fight at The O2 Arena in London, on the Lomachenko vs Campbell undercard, on 31 August 2019.

In the third round of the fight, Martínez landed a combination of punches which staggered the champion, forcing him to take a knee. As he did so, Martínez landed a heavy body shot that completely took Edwards out of the fight. Referee Mark Lyson stopped the bout, while WBC president Mauricio Sulaiman reviewed the fight ending sequence. Sulaiman found the fight ending shot to have landed egregiously late, officially overturning the fight to a no-contest.

During the post-fight interview, Edwards stated: "This is the right decision. I took a knee for a purpose...We get in this ring to abide by the rules". WBC president Mauricio Sulaiman said he had ordered a rematch, to which Edwards acquiesced. Edwards' manager Eddie Hearn was elusive as to the rematch, however, claiming that they planned to move up to super flyweight. Edwards officially vacated his WBC flyweight title on 6 October 2019.

==== Martínez vs. Rosales ====
Following former WBC flyweight champion Charlie Edwards’ decision to vacate the title and move to super flyweight, WBC scheduled the #1 ranked Martínez to fight the #2 ranked Cristofer Rosales for the vacant WBC flyweight championship. Martínez was scheduled to fight the former WBC flyweight titlist on 20 December 2019, on the undercard of the super-middleweight fight between Daniel Jacobs and Julio Cesar Chavez Jr. In November 2019, it was revealed that Martínez had tested positive Clenbuterol, a banned substance. WBC decided not to punish him, as the amount of the muscle-forming drug found in his system wasn't deemed sufficient to register any in-competition benefit. Martínez won the fight with Rosales by a ninth-round technical knockout. Martínez took over the fight in the third round, after two competitive back-and-forth rounds, battering the exhausted former champion until referee Raul Caiz stopped the fight.

==== Martínez vs. Harris ====
Martínez was scheduled to make his first title defense against Jay Harris, on 29 February 2020. It was scheduled for the undercard of the Mikey Garcia-Jessie Vargas welterweight fight. Martínez was the favorite heading into the bout, with Harris being a 7/1 underdog. Martínez pressured throughout the first half of the fight, with his pace slowing from the eight round onward. Harris suffered a cut above his left eye in the second round, and was knocked down in the tenth round. Martínez won the fight by unanimous decision, with varied scorecards of 118–109, 116–111, and 115–112.

==== Martínez vs. Calleros ====
Martínez was scheduled to make his second title defense against Maximino Flores on 23 October 2020. Four days before the fight, Flores announced his withdrawal from the bout due to a positive COVID-19 test. Accordingly, Martínez was rescheduled to defend his title against Moisés Calleros. Calleros accepted the fight on less than one week's notice. Due to the short notice, he was unable to cut weight properly, and weighed in at 117.4 pounds, 5.4 pounds over the title limit. Martínez won the fight by a second-round technical knockdown. He staggered Calleros with a left hook-right straight combination, before unloading with numerous power punches, which forced the referee Cesar Castanon to stop the fight at the 2:42 minute mark. During the post fight interview, Martínez stated his desire to fight fellow titleholder Artem Dalakian and Moruti Mthalane in a title unification bouts, before moving up to super flyweight.

==== Martínez vs. Cordova ====
Martínez was scheduled to defend his title for the third time against the former unified minimumweight world champion Francisco Rodríguez Jr. on 19 December 2020, on the Canelo Álvarez and Callum Smith undercard. Rodríguez Jr. later withdrew from the bout, due to a non-COVID related illness. Martínez was expected to defend his title against McWilliams Arroyo on 27 February 2021. The fight was scheduled as the co-main event to Canelo Álvarez's super middleweight fight with Avni Yıldırım. Martínez withdrew from the fight the day before, due to a hand injury. He suffered a small fracture in his right hand during a sparring session, which was aggravated during the week preceding the fight, causing his hand to swell. Martínez was scheduled to make his third title defense against Joel Cordova on 26 June 2021. Cordova was ranked #15 by the WBC. He won the fight by a sixth-round technical knockout. Martínez first knocked Cordova down with a left hook and piled on strikes which forced the referee to stop the fight.

==== Martínez vs. Arroyo ====
On 4 October 2021, it was revealed that Martínez would face the WBC interim flyweight titleholder McWilliams Arroyo on 19 November 2021, on the undercard of the Demetrius Andrade and Jason Quigley middleweight title fight. The bout would be streamed by DAZN from the SNHU Arena in Manchester, New Hampshire. The pair was originally scheduled to face each other on 27 February 2021, before Martínez withdrew due to a hand injury. The fight was ruled a no-contest at the end of the second round, due to an accidental clash of heads which caused cut above Arroyo's right. The fight was stopped after Arroyo told the ringside physician that he was unable to see out of the damaged eye.

==== Martínez vs. González ====
Martínez faced the former four-weight world champion Román González in the main event of a DAZN broadcast card on 5 March 2022 at junior bantamweight. González was ranked #1 by the WBA and #2 by the WBC, as well as #2 by The Ring. Martínez stepped in with less than six weeks notice as replacement for Juan Francisco Estrada, who was forced to withdraw from the fight due to a positive COVID-19 test. He was defeated by González by unanimous decision, with the judges scoring the fight 118–110, 117–111 and 116–112 all in favor of González.

==== Martínez vs. Carmona ====
Martínez was expected to face the WBC interim flyweight champion McWilliams Arroyo in a rematch on 25 June 2022, after their first fight ended in a no-contest following an accidental head clash in the third round. On 22 June, three days before the bout was supposed to take place, Martínez withdrew with an illness. This marked the third time that he had withdrawn from this specific match up, having withdraw once in each of the two previous calendar years. The pair reached an agreement to pursue separate bouts on 12 July, which allowed Martínez to enter into negotiations for a title unification bout with the reigning IBF flyweight titlist Sunny Edwards. As these negotiations fell through, Martínez was once again booked to face the WBC interim champion McWilliams Arroyo. The bout was expected to take place at the Desert Diamond Arena in Glendale, Arizona on 3 December 2022. Arroyo withdrew from the bout on 8 November, with a neck injury. Martínez was rescheduled to face Samuel Carmona at the same date and venue. He won the fight by majority decision, with two judges awarding him a 117–111 and 116–112 scorecard, while the third judge scored the bout as an even 114–114 draw.

==== Martínez vs. Batista ====
Martínez was initially expected to face the mandatory WBC title challenger McWilliams Arroyo on 6 May 2023. Arroyo was however unable to make the date, due to a pre-existing injury. Martínez instead made a voluntary defense against Ronal Batista on the same date. He retained the title by an eleventh-round technical knockout, after having knocked Batista down in the seventh round. The knockdown was first ruled a slip by the in-ring referee, but ringside officials scored it as a knockdown in between the rounds. Batista was docked a point after the end of the fourth round, as he landed a strike after the bell had sounded.

==== Martínez vs. Cordova ====
Martínez was scheduled to defend his WBC flyweight title against Angelino Cordova on 16 December 2023 at The Armory in Minneapolis. The fight was postponed due to VISA issue on Martínez's side. In February 2024, it was announced that the fight was rescheduled for 30 March 2024 at T-Mobile Arena in Las Vegas. Martínez twice knocked Cordova down and won the fight by majority decision. Two of the judges scored the fight 114–112 for the champion, while the third ringside official handed in an even 113–113 scorecard. The fight was later overturned to a no contest when Martinez failed a post fight drug test.

== Professional boxing record ==
27 fights	20 wins	4 losses
By knockout	15	2
By decision	5	2
No contests	3	

No.	Result	Record	Opponent	Type	Round, time	Date	Location	Notes
27	Loss	20–4 (3)	Gerardo Valenzuela Munoz	TKO	8 (10), 0:35	31 May 2025	Palenque Fex, Mexicali, Mexico	
26	NC	20–3 (3)	Angelino Cordova	NC	12	30 Mar 2024	T-Mobile Arena, Paradise, Nevada, U.S.	WBC flyweight title at stake; Originally MD win for Martínez, later ruled NC after he failed a drug test
25	Win	20–3 (2)	Ronal Batista	TKO	11 (12), 1:00	6 May 2023	Estadio Akron, Zapopan, Mexico	Retained WBC flyweight title
24	Win	19–3 (2)	Samuel Carmona	MD	12	3 Dec 2022	Desert Diamond Arena, Glendale, Arizona, U.S.	Retained WBC flyweight title
23	Loss	18–3 (2)	Román González	UD	12	5 Mar 2022	Pechanga Arena, San Diego, California, U.S.	
22	NC	18–2 (2)	McWilliams Arroyo	NC	3 (12), 0:01	19 Nov 2021	SNHU Arena, Manchester, New Hampshire, U.S.	Retained WBC flyweight title; Arroyo unable to continue after accidental head clash
21	Win	18–2 (1)	Joel Cordova	TKO	6 (12), 0:59	26 Jun 2021	Arena Alcalde, Guadalajara, Mexico	Retained WBC flyweight title
20	Win	17–2 (1)	Moisés Calleros	TKO	2 (12), 2:42	23 Oct 2020	Gimnasio TV Azteca, Mexico City, Mexico	Retained WBC flyweight title
19	Win	16–2 (1)	Jay Harris	UD	12	29 Feb 2020	The Ford Center at The Star, Frisco, Texas, U.S.	Retained WBC flyweight title
18	Win	15–2 (1)	Cristofer Rosales	TKO	9 (12), 1:20	20 Dec 2019	Talking Stick Resort Arena, Phoenix, Arizona, U.S.	Won vacant WBC flyweight title
17	NC	14–2 (1)	Charlie Edwards	NC	3 (12), 1:43	31 Aug 2019	The O2 Arena, London, England	WBC flyweight title at stake; Originally a KO win for Martinez, later ruled a NC after Edwards was hit while he was down
16	Win	14–2	Andrew Selby	KO	5 (12), 0:57	23 Mar 2019	Centro de Espectáculos del Recinto Ferial, Metepec, Mexico	
15	Win	13–2	Irvin Ordaz	TKO	1 (8), 1:52	26 Jan 2019	Lienzo Charro, Ciudad Guzman, Mexico	
14	Win	12–2	Victor Ruiz	KO	1 (8), 1:57	6 Oct 2018	Estadio Chevron, Tijuana, Mexico	
13	Win	11–2	Juan Lopez Martinez	KO	1 (8), 2:11	11 Aug 2018	Mexico City Arena, Mexico City, Mexico	
12	Win	10–2	Ivan Meneses Flores	TKO	2 (8), 0:23	7 Jul 2018	Domo del Parque San Rafael, Guadalajara, Mexico	
11	Win	9–2	Jose Armando Valdes	RTD	6 (10), 3:00	23 Feb 2018	Associación Mexico Japonesa, Mexico City, Mexico	
10	Win	8–2	Martin Tecuapetla	TKO	4 (6), 2:59	16 Dec 2017	Domo Sindicato de Trabajadores IMSS, Tlalpan, Mexico	
9	Win	7–2	Marvin Diaz	TKO	1 (10), 2:47	7 Oct 2017	Arena Jalisco, Guadalajara, Mexico	
8	Win	6–2	Édgar Sosa	UD	8	17 Jun 2017	Explanada Delegacion Cuauhtemoc, Mexico City, Mexico	
7	Win	5–2	Hugo Hernandez Aguilar	UD	8	1 Oct 2016	Deportivo Plan Sexenal, Mexico City, Mexico	
6	Win	4–2	Joaquin Cruz	MD	8	13 Aug 2016	Arena Querétaro, Querétaro, Mexico	
5	Win	3–2	Israel Izquierdo	TKO	1 (6), 1:02	9 Jul 2016	Arena Querétaro, Querétaro, Mexico	
4	Win	2–2	Leonardo Baez	TKO	2 (6), 1:20	2 Apr 2016	Auditorio BB, Mexico City, Mexico	
3	Win	1–2	Sergio Granados	TKO	2 (4), 2:24	3 Mar 2016	Auditorio Blackberry, Mexico City, Mexico	
2	Loss	0–2	Joaquin Cruz	SD	4	16 Oct 2015	Auditorio Pablo Colín, Cuautitlán Izcalli, Mexico	
1	Loss	0–1	Fernando Monroy	TKO	2 (4), 1:34	21 Mar 2013	Jose Cuervo Salon, Polanco, Mexico	

== See also ==
- List of world flyweight boxing champions
- List of Mexican boxing world champions

Sporting positions
World boxing titles
Vacant Title last held by Charlie Edwards	WBC flyweight champion 20 December 2019 – 23 May 2024	Vacant
