= Roshan Doug =

British writer and academic

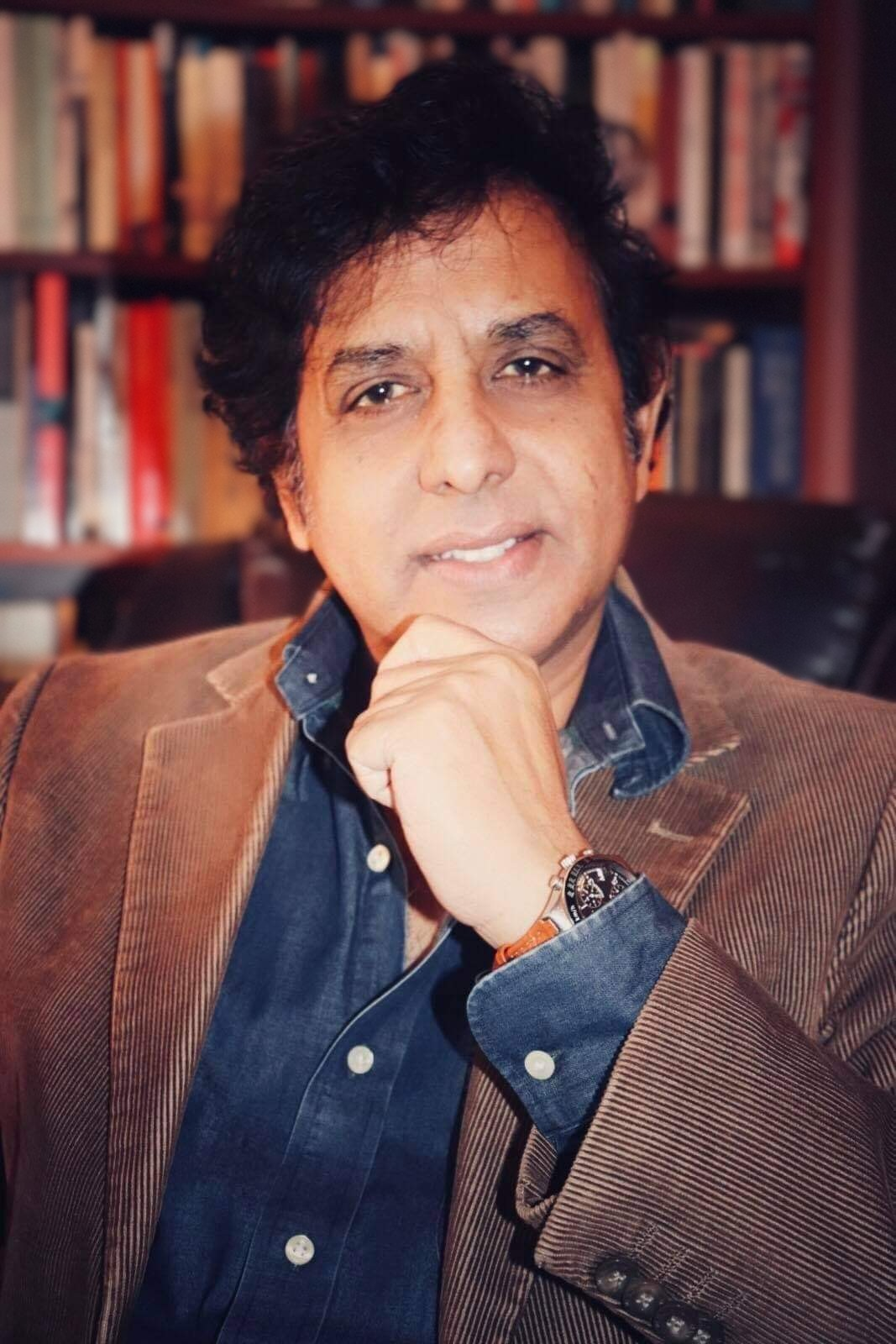
- Roshan Doug in 2020
- Born: October 1963 (age 62); Jalandhar, India
- Occupation: Writer
- Years active: 1995–present (31 years)
- Website: roshandoug.com

Roshan Doug is a British writer and academic of Indian descent. He is a former Birmingham Poet Laureate appointed in 2000. Since 2002 he has also been an INSET poet for the Poetry Society of Great Britain and a Fellow of the Royal Society of Arts. Doug works with various examining boards in the UK including AQA and Pearsons.

Doug is a public speaker and critic for BBC London and The Times Educational Supplement.

== Early life and career ==
Roshan Doug was born in 1963 in Jalandhar, Punjab, India, and studied English at Lancaster University in the United Kingdom. After graduation, he took an academic post in Greece, teaching English for the British Council. On his return to Britain in 1988, he was awarded the Cripps Hall Residential Tutorship at the University of Nottingham where he completed an MA in Modern English Literature.

In 2009 he was awarded Birmingham University Bursary for his doctoral research in education (Learning and Learning Contexts) which he completed in 2015. Since then, Doug worked at the University of Central England as visiting professor of poetry and poet-in-residence. Today he is a Fellow of the Royal Society of Arts, art investor, adviser to the International Education Management Agency, and a patron of the theatre.

== Literary career ==
Doug's first book Delusions was published in 1995. He has been anthologised by Spouting Forth (1997), Staple (2000), and Bloodaxe in their "Out of Bounds" volume of poetry (2013). He has also written an introduction to Suniye-Sunaiye (2025), an English/Hindi poetry anthology ed. Dr Mahendra Verma, University of York.

In 2001 the Orange Studio commissioned a collection, No I am Not Prince Hamlet, integrating themes of home, familiarity and cultural identity. In 2003, Doug was commissioned by Birmingham City University to produce a series of short elegies to commemorate the anniversary of the terrorist attacks in New York. This formed a volume entitled The Delicate Falling of a God. He was shortlisted for the Asian Jewel Awards in the same year.

Doug's first collection of love poems, What Light is Light, was published by the University of Birmingham in 2012 and then "Mother India" the following year. Together with his appearance on the BBC 1's Big Questions in which he criticised the pervading influence of Islamic militancy in certain schools and a commission from the Indian High Commission, it led critics to conclude that his politics were shifting towards Hindu nationalism. He has condemned the Islamic terror attack in Kashmir in his video poem, I Dare You (2025). The Radio Times has described him as 'the Asian poet laureate.

Doug has been commissioned by national and international organisations such as National Gallery London (1998), BBC Children in Need (2000), Birmingham Waterhall Gallery (2001), Martineau Place Birmingham (2001), Buckingham Palace for the Queen's 75th birthday (2001), The High Commission of India (2003), Adult Learners' Conference NEC Birmingham (2003), Embassy of the United States, London (2005), Graham Kershaw in 2005 and BBC Radio 4's Something Understood.

In 2016, Doug published a paper in the International Journal of Education & Literacy Studies: "BIC Government White Paper, Handwriting: Developing Pupils' Identity and Cognitive Skills". As a critic, he has also worked with BBC Radio 2, appeared on BBC Radio 4’s The Long View with Jonathan Freeland and John Sessions, and has had his poetry featured on Poetry Please and Finelines with Imtiaz Dharker and Simon Armitage. In 2000 his poem "Taj Mahal" was used as a GCSE exam assessment piece in the Unseen Text paper.

== Publications ==
As a columnist, Doug has written articles for publications such as The Guardian, The Times, The Independent, The Daily Telegraph, The Daily Mail, The Sunday Times, EasternEye and the BBC in-house magazine, Ariel. Doug has written papers including "The Business of Poetry" for the North East Wales Institute of Higher Education for their conference "The Narrative Practitioner", "Gandhi: a Punjabi perspective" for The London Review of Books, and "The British Schools' National Curriculum: English and the politics of teaching poetry from different cultures and traditions" for The Journal of Curriculum Studies.

=== Books ===
- Delusions, Charles Green Education (1995) ISBN 0-9526283-0-9
- The English-knowing Men, Castle View Publications (1999) ISBN 0-9535407-0-7
- No, I am Not Prince Hamlet, Orange Studio (2002) ISBN 0-9542162-0-2
- The Delicate Falling of a God, UCE Press (2003) ISBN 0-90435457-1
- Illusions, Delusions and Dirty Words, UCE Press (April 2004) ISBN 0904354806
- What Light is Light, Birmingham University (November 2011) ISBN 978-0-7044-2815-7
- Kabhi Kabhie, Amazon/Kindle (February 2021) ISBN 9798704608554
- Narrative study: an immigrant pupil's experience of English and multicultural education, Doctoral thesis, University of Birmingham, 2016

== BBC broadcasts ==
Doug has written and presented many arts documentary features for BBC such as Infinite New Verses (recorded in China 2004), Pause for Thought (Radio 2), Something Understood, A Land of Ghosts, The Asian Single Parents (London 2006), A Land of Dreams and Goblins (India 2002), Cuba Libre (Havana 2006) and The English-knowing Men on the themes in Anglo-Asian Poetry (London, 2005). His BBC programme "The Good Father" broadcast in 2004, was nominated for the Sony Radio Awards.
