= Birmingham Poet Laureate =

British honorary role

The position of Birmingham Poet Laureate was created in the mid-1990s, with the awardee "chosen from poets who live or practice in Birmingham by a panel of judges." An honorary role, poets act as a "poetry ambassador", helping to raise the profile of poetry across Birmingham, penning poetry for special occasions, leading workshops, mentoring the newly appointed Young Poet Laureate, and "inspiring others to try their own hand at reading and writing poetry."

The next laureate is typically announced on National Poetry Day at the Birmingham Literature Festival. The Birmingham Poets Laureate schemes were from 1996 to 2024 run by Birmingham Libraries and are now managed by Writing West Midlands.

== Birmingham Poet Laureates ==
The first Birmingham Poet Laureate was artist/writer Brian Lewis (1996-1997) whose publications include Waters of Birmingham: Birmingham Laureate Poems, which was published in 1997.

The 2022-2024 Birmingham Poet Laureate is Jasmine Gardosi, a "writer and activist whose work has covered mental health and LGBTQ+ issues."

- 1996 to 1997 - Brian Lewis
- 1997 to 1998 - David Hart
- 1998 to 1999 - Sibyl Ruth
- 1999 to 2000 - Simon Pitt
- 2000 to 2001 - Roshan Doug
- 2001 to 2002 - Roi Kwabena
- 2002 to 2003 - Julie Boden
- 2003 to 2004 - Roz Goddard
- 2004 to 2005 - Don Barnard
- 2005 to 2006 - Richard Grant, aka Dreadlockalien
- 2006 to 2007 - Giovanni "Spoz" Esposito
- 2008 to 2009 - Chris Morgan
- 2009 to 2010 - Adrian Johnson
- 2010 to 2011 - Roy McFarlane
- 2011 to 2012 - Jan Watts
- 2012 to 2013 - Stephen Morrison-Burke
- 2013 to 2014 - Joanna Skelt
- 2014 to 2016 - Adrian Blackledge
- 2016 to 2018 - Matt Windle
- 2018 to 2022 - Richard O'Brien
- 2020 to 2022 - Casey Bailey
- 2022 to 2024 - Jasmine Gardosi
- 2024 to 2026 - Ayan Aden

=== Young Birmingham Poet Laureate ===
From West Heath, Birmingham, Iona Mandal is the 2022-2024 Young Birmingham Poet Laureate, replacing Fatma Mohiuddin. Iona won her first poetry award – the Children's Book Show Award for Poetry 2013 - at the age of 7. She is the first Bengali of Indian diaspora to win the Birmingham role.

- 2005 to 2006 - Helen Monks
- 2006 to 2007 - Jennifer Brough
- 2007 to 2008 - Matt Windle
- 2008 to 2009 - Megan Bradbury
- 2009 to 2010 - India Miller
- 2010 to 2011 - Jordan Westcarr
- 2011 to 2012 - Damani Dennisur
- 2012 to 2013 - Claire Guest
- 2013 to 2014 - Lauren Williams
- 2014 to 2016 - Serena Arthur
- 2016 to 2018 - Nyanda Foday
- 2018 to 2020 - Aliyah Begum,
- 2020 to 2022 - Fatma Mohiuddin
- 2022 to 2024 - Iona Mandal
- 2024 to 2026 - Japmeh Kaur Gujral
