= Jasmine Gardosi =

British writer and activist

Jasmine Gardosi is a British writer and activist whose work has covered mental health and LGBTQ+ issues.

== Biography ==
Gardosi went to King Edward VI High School for Girls in Birmingham, where she recollects how she struggled reading aloud in class. A multiple slam champion and beatboxer, Gardosi began performing at open-mic nights across Birmingham after leaving university.

Her debut pamphlet was Hurtz, published by Verve Poetry Press in 2019.

She has been Poet in Residence at both the Shakespeare Birthplace Trust and the Brontë Parsonage Museum, and was named as one of Nonchalant Magazine's Iconic Queer Poets in 2022.

Gardosi was announced as Birmingham Poet Laureate for the period October 2022–September 2024 on National Poetry Day 2022.

In June 2023, she was invited to headline Estonia's first queer poetry slam, as part of Baltic Pride.

Gardosi's work has been influenced by Benjamin Zephaniah, Kae Tempest and spoken word artists like Hannah Silva and Bohdan Piesecki.

== Dancing to Music You Hate (2021–) ==
Gardosi's debut show is Dancing to Music You Hate. Commissioned by Warwick Arts Centre and first performed in 2021, the show combines poetry, beatboxing and "Celtic Dubstep" to explore themes around gender identity. It was shortlisted for the Saboteur Awards' Best Spoken Word Show in 2022, eventually winning the award in 2023 — the same year Gardosi also won Best Spoken Word Performer.
