= Cristofer Rosales =

Nicaraguan boxer

Personal information
- Nickname: El Látigo
- Born: Cristofer Jordan Rosales González; 6 October 1994 (age 32) Managua, Nicaragua
- Height: 5 ft 6 1/2 in (169 cm)
- Weight: Light flyweight; Flyweight

Boxing career
- Reach: 71 1/2 in (182 cm)
- Stance: Orthodox

Boxing record
- Total fights: 44
- Wins: 37
- Win by KO: 22
- Losses: 7

Cristofer Jordan Rosales González (born 6 October 1994) is a Nicaraguan professional boxer who held the WBC flyweight title in 2018.

== Professional career ==
Rosales turned professional in 2013 and had a record 26–3 before challenging Japanese boxer Daigo Higa for the vacant WBC flyweight title. During the weigh-in for the fight Higa missed weight and the title became vacant with only Rosales eligible to win it. In the fight itself Rosales would go on to stop Higa in the ninth round to capture the vacant WBC title.

In his first title defence, Rosales defeated two-time Olympic bronze medalist Paddy Barnes. Barnes started the fight well, but Rosales caught him with a body shot in the fourth, from which Barnes could not get up.

In his second title defence, Rosales suffered a surprising loss to Charlie Edwards. Rosales started the fight well, but Edwards was staying calm and boxing smart throughout the fight, earning him the unanimous decision (UD) victory over the Nicaraguan.

On 20 December 2019, Rosales fought Julio Cesar Martinez for the WBC flyweight title, after a decision from Edwards to not take the rematch against Martinez and vacate his title. Both fighter came out aggressively and traded punches in the opening rounds. From the third round on, Martinez was starting to dominate the fight and hurt Rosales, until the referee decided to stop the fight in round nine.

== Professional boxing record ==
44 fights	37 wins	7 losses
By knockout	22	2
By decision	14	5
By disqualification	1	0

No.	Result	Record	Opponent	Type	Round, time	Date	Location	Notes
44	Loss	37–7	Kenshiro Teraji	TKO	11 (12), 0:06	13 Oct 2024	Ariake Arena, Tokyo, Japan	For vacant WBC flyweight title
43	Win	37–6	Francisco Gomez Sanchez	UD	8	23 Mar 2024	Zapopan, Mexico	
42	Win	36–6	Abraham Medina	TKO	2 (10), 2:30	26 Aug 2023	Puerto Salvador Allende, Managua, Nicaragua	
41	Win	35–6	Joselito Velázquez	UD	10	3 Dec 2022	Desert Diamond Arena, Glendale, Arizona, U.S.	
40	Win	34–6	Wilmer Blas	UD	10	17 Sep 2022	Nuevo Gimnasio Nicarao, Managua, Nicaragua	
39	Win	33–6	Ernesto Irias	UD	10	25 Jun 2022	Nuevo Gimnasio Nicarao, Managua, Nicaragua	
38	Loss	32–6	Ángel Ayala	UD	12	9 Apr 2021	Centro de Espectáculos del Recinto Ferial, Metepec, Mexico	
37	Win	32–5	Jerson Ortiz	DQ	5 (8), 3:00	29 Jan 2021	Polideportivo Alexis Arguello, Managua, Nicaragua	
36	Win	31–5	Samuel Gutiérrez	UD	8	24 Sep 2020	Dade County Fair & Expo, Miami, Florida, U.S.	
35	Win	30–5	Jeno Tonte	TKO	4 (8), 1:32	29 Aug 2020	Venice Arena, Venice, Florida, U.S.	
34	Loss	29–5	Julio Cesar Martinez	TKO	9 (12), 1:19	20 Dec 2019	Talking Stick Resort Arena, Phoenix, Arizona, U.S.	For vacant WBC flyweight title
33	Win	29–4	Eliecer Quezada	TKO	7 (8), 1:44	24 Aug 2019	Nuevo Gimnasio Nicarao, Managua, Nicaragua	
32	Loss	28–4	Charlie Edwards	UD	12	22 Dec 2018	The O2 Arena, London, England	Lost WBC flyweight title
31	Win	28–3	Paddy Barnes	KO	4 (12), 3:06	18 Aug 2018	Windsor Park, Belfast, Northern Ireland	Retained WBC flyweight title
30	Win	27–3	Daigo Higa	TKO	9 (12), 1:42	15 Apr 2018	Yokohama Arena, Yokohama, Japan	Won vacant WBC flyweight title
29	Win	26–3	Alexander Taylor	TKO	8 (8), 0:20	24 Nov 2017	Puerto Salvador Allende, Managua, Nicaragua	
28	Win	25–3	Mohammed Obbadi	RTD	7 (12), 3:00	21 Oct 2017	Palasport Maurizio Crisafulli, Pordenone, Italy	Won vacant WBC International flyweight title
27	Win	24–3	Martin Tecuapetla	UD	10	28 Jul 2017	Nuevo Gimnasio Nicarao, Managua, Nicaragua	Retained WBC Latino flyweight title
26	Loss	23–3	Andrew Selby	UD	12	26 May 2017	Motorpoint Arena, Cardiff, Wales	
25	Win	23–2	Eliecer Quezada	SD	10	31 Mar 2017	Puerto Salvador Allende, Managua, Nicaragua	Retained WBC Latino flyweight title
24	Win	22–2	Sebastian Sanchez	UD	10	24 Feb 2017	Puerto Salvador Allende, Managua, Nicaragua	Won vacant WBC Latino flyweight title
23	Win	21–2	Sammy Reyes	TKO	3 (8), 1:06	27 Jan 2017	Puerto Salvador Allende, Managua, Nicaragua	
22	Win	20–2	Herald Molina	TKO	2 (6), 0:20	16 Dec 2016	Puerto Salvador Allende, Managua, Nicaragua	
21	Win	19–2	Alexander Taylor	UD	8	25 Nov 2016	Puerto Salvador Allende, Managua, Nicaragua	
20	Win	18–2	Marlon Prado	UD	6	17 Sep 2016	Puerto Salvador Allende, Managua, Nicaragua	
19	Win	17–2	Ulises Martin	TKO	9 (9), 0:53	6 Feb 2016	Casino Kingdom Hotel Barcelo, Managua, Nicaragua	Won vacant WBA Fedecentro light flyweight title
18	Win	16–2	Martin Diaz	TKO	2 (8), 2:40	5 Dec 2015	Gimnasio Multiusos del IND, Managua, Nicaragua	
17	Win	15–2	Alexander Taylor	TKO	6 (10), 2:27	24 Oct 2015	Gimnasio Multiusos del IND, Managua, Nicaragua	
16	Win	14–2	Herald Molina	TKO	2 (8), 3:00	22 Aug 2015	Gimnasio Municipal Guy Rouck Chavez, Matagalpa, Nicaragua	
15	Win	13–2	Roger Collado	UD	9	26 Jun 2015	Centro de Convenciones Hotel Hex, Managua, Nicaragua	Won vacant WBA Fedecentro light flyweight title
14	Win	12–2	Gerardo Sandoval	TKO	6 (6), 0:46	9 May 2015	Gimnasio Alexis Arguello, Managua, Nicaragua	
13	Win	11–2	Jose Aguilar	TKO	6 (8), 2:41	18 Apr 2015	Polideportivo Augusto Sandino, El Rosario, Nicaragua	
12	Loss	10–2	Kal Yafai	PTS	8	28 Mar 2015	Sheffield Arena, Sheffield, England	
11	Win	10–1	Herald Molina	KO	10 (10), 0:55	30 Jan 2015	Centro de Convenciones Hotel Hex, Managua, Nicaragua	
10	Win	9–1	Jose Aguilar	UD	6	27 Nov 2014	Gimnasio Alexis Arguello, Managua, Nicaragua	
9	Win	8–1	William Trana	TKO	1 (6), 2:59	25 Oct 2014	Gimnasio Municipal Guy Rouck Chavez, Matagalpa, Nicaragua	
8	Win	7–1	Yader Cardoza	KO	1 (8), 1:10	26 Sep 2014	Centro de Convenciones Hotel Hex, Managua, Nicaragua	
7	Win	6–1	Miguel Alfaro	TKO	2 (4), 2:28	9 Aug 2014	Gimnasio Alexis Arguello, Managua, Nicaragua	
6	Win	5–1	Luis Rios	MD	6	28 Jun 2014	Gimnasio Alexis Arguello, Managua, Nicaragua	
5	Win	4–1	Wilmer Blas	TKO	3 (4), 2:48	23 Nov 2013	Gimnasio Alexis Arguello, Managua, Nicaragua	
4	Win	3–1	Luis Ruiz	KO	3 (4), 2:30	21 Sep 2013	Crowne Plaza, Managua, Nicaragua	
3	Loss	2–1	Keyvin Lara	UD	4	30 Aug 2013	Batallon de Infanteria Mecanizada, Managua, Nicaragua	
2	Win	2–0	Isaias Galeano	UD	4	22 Jun 2013	Gimnasio Municipal Guy Rouck Chavez, Matagalpa, Nicaragua	
1	Win	1–0	Marcos Arauz	TKO	1 (4), 1:24	25 May 2013	Polideportivo Espana, Managua, Nicaragua	

== See also ==
- List of world flyweight boxing champions

Sporting positions
Regional boxing titles
Preceded by Herald Molina	Nicaraguan flyweight champion 30 January 2015 – December 2015; Vacated	Vacant
Vacant Title last held by Eliecer Quezada	WBA Fedecentro light flyweight champion 26 June 2015 – August 2015; Vacated	Vacant Title next held by Himself
Vacant Title last held by Himself	WBA Fedecentro light flyweight champion 6 February 2016 – September 2016; Vacated	Vacant
Vacant Title last held by Lucas Emanuel Fernandez Leone	WBC Latino flyweight champion 24 February 2017 – August 2017; Vacated	Vacant Title next held by Eliecer Quezada
Vacant Title last held by Andrew Selby	WBC International flyweight champion 21 October 2017 – April 2018; Vacated	Vacant Title next held by Ulises Lara
World boxing titles
Vacant Title last held by Daigo Higa	WBC flyweight champion 15 April 2018 – 22 December 2018	Succeeded by Charlie Edwards
