= Andrés Campos (boxer) =

Chilean boxer

Personal information
- Born: Andrés Ignacio Campos González; 15 September 1996 (age 29) Santiago, Chile
- Height: 5 ft 3.5 in (161 cm)
- Weight: Flyweight; Bantamweight

Boxing career
- Reach: 64.5 in (164 cm)
- Stance: Orthodox

Boxing record
- Total fights: 21
- Wins: 17
- Win by KO: 6
- Losses: 3
- Draws: 1

Andrés Ignacio Campos González (born 15 September 1996) is a Chilean professional boxer. He is a one-time IBF flyweight title challenger, having fought for the title in 2023.and the current IBO Inter-continental flyweight champion

== Professional career ==
=== Early career ===
Campos made his professional debut against Guillermo Dejeas on 10 August 2018. He won the fight by unanimous decision, with scores of 40–35, 39–37 and 40–35. Campos next beat Luis Gonzalo Sucasaca Pari by unanimous decision on 19 October 2018, Marcos Emilio Villafane by unanimous decision, on 25 January 2019 and Claudio Lavinanza by split decision on 30 March 2019.

Campos faced Agustín Francisco David Leiton on 5 July 2019. He won the fight by a second–round technical knockout. It was the first knockout victory of his professional career.

Campos faced Ramón Velásquez on 5 July 2019, at the Alto San Francisco in Santiago, Chile, in what was his first ten-round bout. He only needed six rounds however, as Velásquez opted to retire from the fight before the seventh round.

Campos faced Ritesh Gaunder on 23 November 2019, at the Seagulls Rugby League Club in Tweed Heads, Australia, in his first professional bout outside of Chile. He won the six–round fight by unanimous decision, with all three judges awarding him every single round.

=== Secondary titlist ===
Campos faced Jesus Martínez for the vacant WBA Fedebol flyweight title on 21 December 2019, at the Gimnasio Municipal in Lo Barnechea, Chile. Campos won the nine round bout by unanimous decision, with scores of 88^{1/2}–84^{1/2}, 89–93 and 88–83^{1/2}.

Campos made the first defense of his secondary title against the undefeated Pedro Villegas on 14 March 2020, at the Gimnasio Club Mexico in Santiago, Chile. Aside from being Campos' first title defense, the vacant WBO Latino flyweight title was likewise on the line. Campos won the fight by unanimous decision, with scores of 98–91, 97–92 and 95–94. He scored the sole knockdown of the fight in the sixth round, dropping Villegas with two consecutive body shots.

After capturing his first two professional titles, Campos fought a rematch with Ramon Velasquez on 12 March 2021, at the Gimnasio Municipal in Lo Barnechea, Chile. The fight was contested in an empty venue, due to restrictions imposed to combat the COVID-19 pandemic. Campos won the fight by unanimous decision, with all three judges scoring the bout 98–91 in his favor. Velasquez was deducted a point in the ninth round for a headbutt. Following this victory, the WBO ranked Campos as the sixth best flyweight in the world. It was the first time that a major world championship group had ranked him in their top ten.

Campos made the second defense of his secondary WBA and the first defense of his secondary WBO title against Sebastian Gomez Sanchez on 4 December 2021, at the Estadio Municipal in Lo Barnechea, Chile. He won the fight by unanimous decision, with scores of 97–92, 98–91 and 100–89. He expressed his desire to fight the reigning WBO flyweight champion Junto Nakatani in his post-fight interview, stating: "I hope next year to be fighting for the world title. We are just one step away".

Campos faced Javier Martínez on 27 February 2022, in the main event of an ESPN Knockout card, which took place at the Las Clavelinas Hotel y Eventos in Ingeniero Maschwitz. He won the bout by a fourth-round knockout, stopping Martinez with a left hook to the body at the 1:26 minute mark. Campos became the first fighter from Chile to win a professional fight in Argentina.

Campos was booked to make his second WBO Latino flyweight title defense against the former WBA World minimumweight interim champion Jesús Silvestre on 11 June 2022, at the Gimnasio Municipal in Lo Barnechea, Chile. He won the fight by unanimous decision, with scores of 100–90, 99–91 and 96–94.

Campos made his third WBO Latino title defense against Gilberto Pedroza on 14 August 2022. He retained the title by unanimous decision, with scores of 97–92, 97–92, and 96–93. Pedroza was deducted point for headbutting in the eight round. His manager Toni Tolj stated in the post-fight press conference: "The plan is to get another title defense before the end of the year. Andrés, myself and (promoter) Nicolás (Martínez) will all head to the WBO Convention in Puerto Rico in October finish off 2022 in style with another step up in competition".

Campos is slated to challenge the IBF flyweight champion Sunny Edwards on 10 June 2023, on the undercard of a DAZN broadcast event, at the Wembley Arena in London, England. He lost the fight by unanimous decision, with all three ringside officials scoring the bout 117–111 for Edwards. He rebounded from his first professional loss with an eighth-round knockout of Bienvenido Ligas on 9 September 2023, in an IBO Inter-continental flyweight title fight.

== Professional boxing record ==
21 fights	17 wins	3 losses
By knockout	6	1
By decision	11	2
Draws	1	

No.	Result	Record	Opponent	Type	Round, time	Date	Location	Notes
21	Loss	17–3–1	Nonito Donaire	TD	9 (12)	14 Jun 2025	Casino Buenos Aires, Buenos Aires, Argentina	For vacant WBA interim bantamweight title; Unanimous TD: Donaire cut from an accidental head clash
20	Win	17–2–1	Jimson Garcia	TKO	5 (10), 0:55	12 Apr 2025	Gimnasio Club México, Santiago, Chile	
19	Loss	16–2–1	Joselito Velázquez	TKO	6 (10), 2:20	4 Oct 2024	Cancún, Quintana Roo, Mexico	
18	Draw	16–1–1	Edinson Martinez	MD	10	18 May 2024	Gimnasio Club México, Santiago, Chile	
17	Win	16–1	Ben Ligas	KO	8 (10), 1:43	9 Sep 2023	Burleigh Bazaar, Gold Coast, Australia	Won vacant IBO Inter-continental flyweight title
16	Loss	15–1	Sunny Edwards	UD	12	10 Jun 2023	Wembley Arena, London, England	For IBF flyweight title
15	Win	15–0	Darío Rubén Ruiz	TKO	4 (8), 1:45	21 Jan 2023	Gimnasio Club México, Santiago, Chile	
14	Win	14–0	Gilberto Pedroza	UD	10	14 Aug 2022	Gimnasio Municipal, Lo Barnechea, Santiago, Chile	Retained WBO Latino flyweight title
13	Win	13–0	Jesús Silvestre	UD	10	11 Jun 2022	Gimnasio Municipal, Lo Barnechea, Chile	Retained WBO Latino flyweight title
12	Win	12–0	Javier Martínez	KO	4 (10), 1:26	27 Feb 2022	Las Clavelinas - Hotel y Eventos, Ingeniero Maschwitz, Argentina	
11	Win	11–0	Francisco Gómez Sánchez	UD	10	4 Dec 2021	Estadio Municipal, Lo Barnechea, Chile	Retained WBA Fedebol and WBO Latino flyweight titles
10	Win	10–0	Ramón Velásquez	UD	10	12 Mar 2021	Gimnasio Municipal, Lo Barnechea, Chile	
9	Win	9–0	Pedro Villegas	UD	10	14 Mar 2020	Gimnasio Club México, Santiago, Chile	Retained WBA Fedebol flyweight title; Won vacant WBO Latino flyweight title
8	Win	8–0	Jesús Martínez	UD	9	21 Dec 2019	Gimnasio Municipal, Lo Barnechea, Chile	Won vacant WBA Fedebol flyweight title
7	Win	7–0	Ritesh Gaunder	UD	6	23 Nov 2019	Seagulls Rugby League Club, Tweed Heads, Australia	
6	Win	6–0	Ramón Velásquez	RTD	6 (10), 3:00	7 Sep 2019	Gimnasio Club México, Santiago, Chile	
5	Win	5–0	Agustín Francisco David Leiton	TKO	2 (8), 1:55	5 Jul 2019	Alto San Francisco, Santiago, Chile	
4	Win	4–0	Claudio Lavinanza	SD	6	30 Mar 2019	Club LibraXLibra, Santiago, Chile	
3	Win	3–0	Marcos Emilio Villafane	UD	6	25 Jan 2019	Gimnasio Federación de Boxeo, San Miguel, Chile	
2	Win	2–0	Luis Gonzalo Sucasaca Pari	UD	4	19 Oct 2018	Gimnasio Club México, Santiago, Chile	
1	Win	1–0	Guillermo Dejeas	UD	4	10 Aug 2018	Gimnasio Club México, Santiago, Chile	
