= Ross Murray (boxer) =

Scottish boxer

Personal information
- Nationality: Scottish
- Born: 1 January 1982 (age 44) Glasgow, Scotland
- Height: 5 ft 4 in (163 cm)
- Weight: Light-flyweight; Flyweight; Super-flyweight

Boxing career
- Stance: Orthodox

Boxing record
- Total fights: 12
- Wins: 10
- Win by KO: 1
- Losses: 2

Ross Murray (born 1 January 1982) is a Scottish professional boxer who challenged for the Commonwealth flyweight title in 2018.

== Professional career ==
Murray made his professional debut on 25 June 2016, scoring a four-round points decision (PTS) victory over Sergey Tasimov at the Bellahouston Leisure Centre in Glasgow, Scotland.

== Professional boxing record ==
12 fights	10 wins	2 losses
By knockout	1	2
By decision	9	0

No.	Result	Record	Opponent	Type	Round, time	Date	Location	Notes
12	Win	10–2	(Tanzania) John Chuwa	UD	10	24 May 2019	(United Kingdom) Crowne Plaza Hotel, Glasgow, Scotland	Won WBC International Silver light-flyweight title
11	Win	9–2	(United Kingdom) Steven Maguire	PTS	6	2 Feb 2019	(United Kingdom) Crowne Plaza Hotel, Glasgow, Scotland	
10	Loss	8–2	(United Kingdom) Jay Harris	TKO	3 (12), 2:48	3 Nov 2018	(United Kingdom) York Hall, London, England	For Commonwealth flyweight title
9	Win	8–1	(United Kingdom) Steven Maguire	PTS	6	16 Jun 2018	(United Kingdom) Lagoon Leisure Centre, Paisley, Scotland	
8	Win	7–1	(United Kingdom) Gary Reeve	PTS	6	7 Apr 2018	(United Kingdom) Lagoon Leisure Centre, Paisley, Scotland	
7	Loss	6–1	(United Kingdom) Sunny Edwards	TKO	4 (10), 2:59	27 Nov 2017	(United Kingdom) Grange St. Paul's Hotel, London, England	For WBO European super-flyweight title
6	Win	6–0	(Hungary) Gyula Dodu	PTS	6	1 Jul 2017	(United Kingdom) Lagoon Leisure Centre, Paisley, Scotland	
5	Win	5–0	(Nicaragua) Jose Hernandez	PTS	6	18 Feb 2017	(United Kingdom) Lagoon Leisure Centre, Paisley, Scotland	
4	Win	4–0	(Russia) Sergey Tasimov	PTS	4	3 Dec 2016	(United Kingdom) Lagoon Leisure Centre, Paisley, Scotland	
3	Win	3–0	(Hungary) Tibor Nadori	KO	3 (4)	7 Oct 2016	(United Kingdom) SSE Hydro, Glasgow, Scotland	
2	Win	2–0	(Georgia (country)) Khvicha Gigolashvili	PTS	4	15 Sep 2016	(United Kingdom) Crowne Plaza Hotel, Glasgow, Scotland	
1	Win	1–0	(Russia) Sergey Tasimov	PTS	4	25 Jun 2016	(United Kingdom) Bellahouston Leisure Centre, Glasgow, Scotland	
