= Sunny Edwards =

Former British Boxer (born 1996)

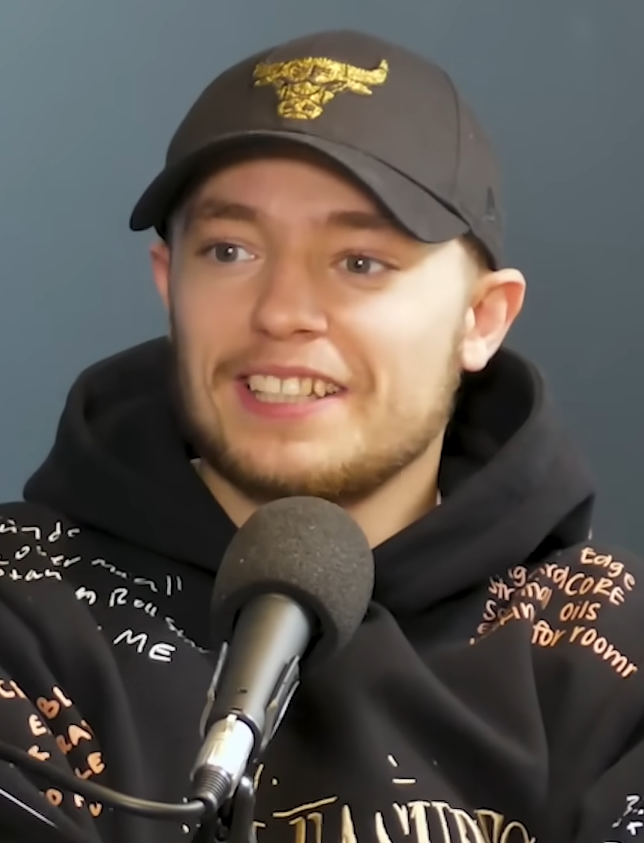
- Edwards in 2022

Personal information
- Nickname: Showtime
- Born: Sunny James Edwards; 1 January 1996 (age 30) Sutton, London, England
- Height: 5 ft 3 in (160 cm)
- Weight: Flyweight; Super flyweight

Boxing career
- Reach: 60 in (152 cm)
- Stance: Orthodox (Note: Listed by BoxRec as Orthodox, but regularly switch-hits as a Southpaw)

Boxing record
- Total fights: 23
- Wins: 21
- Win by KO: 4
- Losses: 2
Medal record
Men's Amateur boxing
Representing England
English National Championships
Gold medal – first place	2015 Liverpool	Light flyweight
Silver medal – second place	2016 Liverpool	Light flyweight

Sunny Edwards (born 1 January 1996) is a British former professional boxer who held the International Boxing Federation (IBF) flyweight title from 2021 to 2023. He is the younger brother of former flyweight world champion and current European bantamweight title holder, Charlie Edwards. Edwards retired from boxing on 30 November 2024.

== Amateur career ==
As an amateur he fought out of Repton ABC and later Steel City ABC, winning multiple national championships; the ABA Juniors in 2013; ABA Youth in 2014; and the ABA Elite in 2015. He also won silver medals in the GB Junior, and ABA Elite Championships in 2012 and 2016 respectively.

== Professional career ==
=== Early career ===
Edwards made his professional debut on 24 September 2016 at the Recinto Ferial in Estepona, Spain, scoring a four-round points decision (PTS) victory over Sergey Tasimov.

After winning his first five fights, one by stoppage, he faced undefeated prospect Ross Murray (6–0, 1 KO) on 27 November 2017 at Grange St. Paul's Hotel in London, with the vacant WBO European super-flyweight title on the line. Edwards won the fight via fourth-round technical knockout (TKO). Following two more wins, he successfully defended his WBO European title on 26 October 2018 with a ten round unanimous decision (UD) victory over Ryan Farrag at the York Hall, London. Two judges scored the bout 100–90 while the third scored it 99–91.

His next fight came on 15 December against Junior Granados at the Brentwood Centre, Essex, for the vacant WBO International super-flyweight title. Edwards overcame a second-round knockdown to add the WBO International to his WBO European title by UD, with the judges' scorecards reading 99–91, 98–91, 97–92. Following the win over Granados, he made a second defence of his WBO European title against Pedro Matos on 27 April 2019, at Wembley Arena, London. Edwards retained his title via eighth-round TKO. His next fight came on 13 July against Hiram Gallardo at The O2 Arena, London, with the vacant IBF International super-flyweight title in the line. Edwards won by UD, adding the IBF International to his WBO titles. All three judges scored the bout 99–90.

Edwards dropped down to flyweight for his next fight, stating, "We dropped down to flyweight because it's looking like I'm more likely to get a world title shot, but it is what it is". On 14 September 2019, he fought Rosendo Guarneros at the York Hall for the vacant IBF International and vacant WBO Inter-Continental flyweight titles. Edwards won by UD, with two judges scoring the bout 99–91 and the third scoring it 100–90.

Edwards fought Marcel Braithwaite on 21 December 2019, for the vacant British super-flyweight title. He won the fight by UD with scores of 117–110, 118–109 and 118–109. Edwards suffered the only knockdown of the fight, as he was knocked down by Braithwaite in the seventh round. Edwards revealed significant swelling on the knuckles of his hands post-fight, which were the result of damaged ligaments. Edwards defended his IBF International on 29 August 2020, defeating Thomas Essomba via UD with scores of 117–112, 117–111, and 116–112.

=== IBF flyweight champion ===
==== Edwards vs. Mthalane ====
Edwards challenged reigning champion Moruti Mthalane for the IBF flyweight title on 30 April 2021. Mthalane came into the fight on a sixteen-fight winning streak, with 13 of those fights being world title bouts. Mthalane's last loss came at the hands of Nonito Donaire on 1 November 2008. Edwards was a slight betting underdog heading into the fight. Edwards won the fight by UD, with two of the judges giving him wide scorecards of 118–111 and 120–108, while the third judge scored it 115–113 for him.

==== Edwards vs. Mama ====
On 24 May 2021, Edwards was ordered to face the IBF mandatory challenger Jayson Mama. Mama was originally set to face Mthalane, before accepting step-aside money to allow Edwards to fight him. The bout was officially scheduled for 11 September 2021 at the Copper Box Arena in Hackney Wick, London. On September 8, Edwards withdrew from the fight with an ankle injury. Accordingly, the title bout was postponed. The fight was rescheduled for 11 December 2021 and took place at the Coca-Cola Arena in Dubai, United Arab Emirates. After John Riel Casimero withdrew from his mandatory title defense against Paul Butler, Edwards' bout with Mama was elevated to main event status. Edwards won the fight by unanimous decision, with scores of 118-109, 118-109 and 117-110. He scored the sole knockdown of the fight in the tenth round, dropping Mama with a left-right combination.

==== Edwards vs. Waseem ====
On 25 January 2022, Edwards' promoters MTK Global announced that he would make the second defense of his title against the one-time IBF title challenger Muhammad Waseem, who was at the time the #3 ranked IBF flyweight contender. The fight was booked for 23 March 2022, and took place at the Aviation Club Tennis Centre in Dubai, United Arab Emirates. Two weeks later, on 9 February, Edwards signed a promotional deal with Probellum. Edwards won the fight by unanimous decision. Two of the judges scored the bout 115–111 in his favour, while the third judge awarded him a 116–110 scorecard. Waseem was deducted a point in both the sixth round for holding and a point in the seventh round for headbutting. Edwards called for a title unification bout with Julio Cesar Martinez in his post-fight interview, stating: "I want The Ring Magazine [title], I want the WBC [title]".

==== Edwards vs. Alvarado ====
On 12 July 2022, it was revealed that Edwards had entered into negotiations for a title unification bout with the WBC flyweight champion Julio Cesar Martinez. The IBF gave Edwards until 7 September to deliver signed contracts as proof of the unification bout taking place. As this failed to happen, on 8 September, the IBF ordered Edwards to make a mandatory title defense against their former light flyweight champion Felix Alvarado. The title bout was booked to take place on 11 November, in London, England. Edwards won the fight by unanimous decision. Two judges scored the bout 115–113 in his favor, while the third judge awarded him a 116–112 scorecard.

==== Edwards vs. Campos ====
On 31 March 2023, it was announced that Edwards had signed a promotional deal with the DAZN backed Matchroom Boxing. It was revealed a few weeks later that Edwards would make his fourth title defense against the #7 ranked IBF flyweight contender Andrés Campos on 10 June 2023, at the OVO Arena Wembley in London, England. He retained the title by unanimous decision, with all three judges awarding him a 117–111 scorecard, and called for a title unification bout with either Jesse Rodriguez or Julio Cesar Martinez next.

==== Edwards vs. Rodriguez ====
Edwards lost his IBF title to WBO flyweight champion Jesse Rodriguez in a title unification bout on 16 December 2023 at the Desert Diamond Arena in Glendale, Arizona, United States by 9th round retirement. Afterwards, Edwards revealed he had suffered a fractured orbital bone earlier in the fight, causing him to see double.

==== Edwards vs. Curiel ====
Edwards was scheduled to face Adrian Curiel in a 12-round super flyweight bout at Footprint Center in Phoenix, Arizona on 29 June 29, 2024. Edwards won the fight via technical decision with the scores 90-82, 88-84 and 87-85. The fight was stopped after eight rounds due to cut Edwards sustained due to an accidental head clash.

==== Edwards vs. Yafai ====
Edwards faced Galal Yafai for the interim WBC flyweight title in Birmingham, England on 30 November 2024. Edwards lost the fight by TKO in the 6th round. After the fight, he announced his retirement from professional boxing.

== Professional boxing record ==
23 fights	21 wins	2 losses
By knockout	4	2
By decision	17	0

No.	Result	Record	Opponent	Type	Round, time	Date	Location	Notes
23	Loss	21–2	Galal Yafai	TKO	6 (12), 1:10	30 Nov 2024	Bp pulse LIVE, Birmingham, England	For interim WBC flyweight title
22	Win	21–1	Adrian Curiel	TD	8 (12), 0:01	29 Jun 2024	Footprint Center, Phoenix, Arizona, US	
21	Loss	20–1	Jesse Rodriguez	RTD	9 (12), 3:00	16 Dec 2023	Desert Diamond Arena, Glendale, Arizona, US	Lost IBF flyweight title; For WBO flyweight title
20	Win	20–0	Andrés Campos	UD	12	10 Jun 2023	Wembley Arena, London, England	Retained IBF flyweight title
19	Win	19–0	Felix Alvarado	UD	12	11 Nov 2022	Sheffield Arena, Sheffield, England	Retained IBF flyweight title
18	Win	18–0	Muhammad Waseem	UD	12	19 Mar 2022	Aviation Club Tennis Centre, Dubai, United Arab Emirates	Retained IBF flyweight title
17	Win	17–0	Jayson Mama	UD	12	11 Dec 2021	Coca-Cola Arena, Dubai, United Arab Emirates	Retained IBF flyweight title
16	Win	16–0	Moruti Mthalane	UD	12	30 Apr 2021	York Hall, London, England	Won IBF flyweight title
15	Win	15–0	Thomas Essomba	UD	12	29 Aug 2020	BT Sport Studio, London, England	Retained IBF International super-flyweight title
14	Win	14–0	Marcel Braithwaite	UD	12	21 Dec 2019	Copper Box Arena, London, England	Won vacant British super-flyweight title
13	Win	13–0	Rosendo Hugo Guarneros	UD	10	14 Sep 2019	York Hall, London, England	Won vacant IBF International, and WBO Inter-Continental flyweight titles
12	Win	12–0	Hiram Gallardo	UD	10	13 Jul 2019	The O2 Arena, London, England	Won vacant IBF International super-flyweight title
11	Win	11–0	Pedro Matos	TKO	8 (10), 0:23	27 Apr 2019	Wembley Arena, London, England	Retained WBO European super-flyweight title
10	Win	10–0	Junior Granados	UD	10	15 Dec 2018	Brentwood Centre, Brentwood, England	Won vacant WBO International super-flyweight title
9	Win	9–0	Ryan Farrag	UD	10	26 Oct 2018	York Hall, London, England	Retained WBO European super-flyweight title
8	Win	8–0	Cristian Narvaez	PTS	6	30 Jun 2018	The SSE Arena, Belfast, Northern Ireland	
7	Win	7–0	Patrik Bartos	TKO	2 (6), 2:18	3 Mar 2018	Brentwood Centre, Brentwood, England	
6	Win	6–0	Ross Murray	TKO	4 (10), 2:59	27 Nov 2017	Grange St. Paul's Hotel, London, England	Won vacant WBO European super-flyweight title
5	Win	5–0	Jose Aguilar	PTS	4	22 Jul 2017	Brentwood Centre, Brentwood, England	
4	Win	4–0	Gyula Dodu	TKO	1 (4), 0:58	20 May 2017	Copper Box Arena, London, England	
3	Win	3–0	Craig Derbyshire	PTS	4	9 Dec 2016	Tolworth Recreation Centre, London, England	
2	Win	2–0	Brett Fidoe	PTS	4	13 Oct 2016	Crowne Plaza Hotel, Glasgow, Scotland	
1	Win	1–0	Sergey Tasimov	PTS	4	24 Sep 2016	Recinto Ferial, Estepona, Spain	

== See also ==
- List of male boxers
- Notable boxing families
- List of British world boxing champions
- List of world flyweight boxing champions

== Notes ==
Sporting positions
Amateur boxing titles
Previous: Harvey Horn	ABA Light-Flyweight champion 2015	Next: Kiaran MacDonald
Regional boxing titles
Vacant Title last held by Jamie Conlan	WBO European super-flyweight champion 27 November 2017 – July 2019; Vacated	Vacant Title next held by Kaisy Khademi
Vacant Title last held by Rex Tso	WBO International super-flyweight champion 15 December 2018 – May 2019; Vacated	Vacant Title next held by Jeyvier Cintrón
Vacant Title last held by Arthur Villanueva	IBF International super-flyweight champion 13 July 2019 – 30 April 2021; Won world title	Vacant Title next held by Phumelele Cafu
Vacant Title last held by Moruti Mthalane	IBF International flyweight champion 14 September 2019 – 30 April 2021; Won world title	Vacant
Vacant Title last held by Paddy Barnes	WBO Inter-Continental flyweight champion 14 September 2019 – 30 April 2021; Won world title	Vacant Title next held by Yankiel Rivera
Vacant Title last held by Charlie Edwards	British super-flyweight champion 21 December 2019 – 30 April 2021; Won world title	Vacant Title next held by Marcel Braithwaite
World boxing titles
Preceded by Moruti Mthalane	IBF flyweight champion 30 April 2021 – 16 December 2023	Succeeded by Jesse Rodriguez
