= Kyle Yousaf =

British boxer (born 1993)

Personal information
- Nickname: Golden Kid
- Nationality: British
- Born: 28 June 1993 (age 33) Sheffield, Yorkshire, England
- Height: 5 ft 8 in (173 cm)
- Weight: Flyweight; Bantamweight

Boxing career
- Stance: Orthodox

Boxing record
- Total fights: 17
- Wins: 17
- Win by KO: 7
- Losses: 0

Kyle Yousaf (born 28 June 1993) is a British professional boxer who held the English flyweight title in 2018.

== Professional career ==
Yousaf made his professional debut on 21 May 2015, scoring a four-round points decision (PTS) victory over Anwar Alfadli at the Octagon Centre in Sheffield, England. He fought another four times in 2015; PTS wins over Stefan Slavchev in March and Mikheil Soloninkini in April; and technical knockout (TKO) wins over Khvicha Gigolashvili in May and Gary Reeve in October.

He secured another five wins in 2016; Sergey Tasimov and Jose Aguilar by PTS in February and April respectively; Robert Kanalas in May, Gyula Dodu in September and Felix Moncada in December, all by TKO.

Following three PTS wins–Louis Norman in May 2017; Brett Fidoe in November; and Isaac Quaye in February 2018–Yousaf fought for his first professional title against Conar Blackshaw on 5 October 2018 at the Barnsley Metrodome in Barnsley. Yousaf won via sixth-round corner retirement (RTD) to capture the English flyweight title.

He secured two more wins in 2019; Steven Maguire by TKO in March and Ricky Leach by PTS in November.

== Professional boxing record ==
17 fights	17 wins	0 losses
By knockout	7	0
By decision	10	0

No.	Result	Record	Opponent	Type	Round, time	Date	Location	Notes
17	Win	17–0	(United Kingdom) Alexander Taylor	PTS	6	17 Sep 2022	(United Kingdom) Magna Centre, Rotherham, England	
16	Win	16–0	(United Kingdom) Ricky Leach	PTS	4	23 Nov 2019	(United Kingdom) Barnsley Metrodome, Barnsley, England	
15	Win	15–0	(United Kingdom) Steven Maguire	TKO	1 (6), 2:24	30 Mar 2019	(United Kingdom) Magna Centre, Rotherham, England	
14	Win	14–0	(United Kingdom) Conar Blackshaw	RTD	6 (10), 3:00	5 Oct 2018	(United Kingdom) Barnsley Metrodome, Barnsley, England	Won vacant English flyweight title
13	Win	13–0	(Ghana) Isaac Quaye	PTS	6	2 Feb 2018	(United Kingdom) Ponds Forge Arena, Sheffield, England	
12	Win	12–0	(United Kingdom) Brett Fidoe	PTS	6	17 Nov 2017	(United Kingdom) Bramall Lane Platinum Suite, Sheffield, England	
11	Win	11–0	(United Kingdom) Louis Norman	PTS	6	27 May 2017	(United Kingdom) Bramall Lane, Sheffield, England	
10	Win	10–0	(Nicaragua) Felix Moncada	TKO	3 (6), 2:36	2 Dec 2016	(United Kingdom) Bramall Lane Platinum Suite, Sheffield, England	
9	Win	9–0	(Hungary) Gyula Dodu	TKO	1 (6), 1:58	30 Sep 2016	(United Kingdom) Bramall Lane Platinum Suite, Sheffield, England	
8	Win	8–0	(Hungary) Robert Kanalas	TKO	1 (6), 1:47	29 May 2016	(United Kingdom) Sheffield City Hall, Sheffield, England	
7	Win	7–0	(Nicaragua) Jose Aguilar	PTS	6	30 Apr 2016	(United Kingdom) Sheffield City Hall, Sheffield, England	
6	Win	6–0	(Russia) Sergey Tasimov	PTS	4	6 Feb 2016	(United Kingdom) Magna Centre, Rotherham, England	
5	Win	5–0	(United Kingdom) Gary Reeve	TKO	1 (4), 1:30	17 Oct 2015	(United Kingdom) Magna Centre, Rotherham, England	
4	Win	4–0	(Georgia (country)) Khvicha Gigolashvili	TKO	2 (4), 1:32	30 May 2015	(United Kingdom) Magna Centre, Rotherham, England	
3	Win	3–0	(Georgia (country)) Mikheil Soloninkini	PTS	4	26 Apr 2015	(United Kingdom) Magna Centre, Rotherham, England	
2	Win	2–0	(Bulgaria) Stefan Slavchev	PTS	4	28 Mar 2015	(United Kingdom) Sheffield Arena, Sheffield, England	
1	Win	1–0	(United Kingdom) Anwar Alfadli	PTS	4	21 Feb 2015	(United Kingdom) Octagon Centre, Sheffield, England	
