= Andrew Selby =

Welsh boxer

Personal information
- Nickname: Superstar
- Nationality: Welsh
- Born: 25 December 1988 (age 37) Barry, Wales
- Height: 5 ft 6 in (168 cm)
- Weight: Flyweight

Boxing career
- Stance: Orthodox

Boxing record
- Total fights: 14
- Wins: 13
- Win by KO: 7
- Losses: 1
Medal record
Representing Wales
World Amateur Championships
Silver medal – second place	2011 Baku	Flyweight
Bronze medal – third place	2013 Almaty	Flyweight
European Amateur Championships
Gold medal – first place	2011 Ankara	Flyweight
Gold medal – first place	2013 Minsk	Flyweight

Andrew Selby (born 25 December 1988) is a Welsh professional boxer who held the British flyweight title from 2016 to 2019. As an amateur, he won a silver medal at the 2011 World Championships, Bronze at the 2013 World Championships, and gold at the 2011 and 2013 European Championships, all in the flyweight division. He is the younger brother of former featherweight world champion Lee Selby.

== Amateur career ==
Hailing from Colcot, Barry, Vale of Glamorgan, Selby claimed a silver medal at the 2011 World Amateur Boxing Championships in Baku, Azerbaijan, after he was pipped 13:12 by Misha Aloyan. The tournament was also a qualifying tournament for the 2012 London Olympics with a quarter-final being the usual qualification criteria. However, as Selby wasn't the only Brit in his weight division, he had to wait until later that year to seal Olympic qualification when he met Beijing Olympian Khalid Yafai at the 2011 GB Amateur Boxing Championships. Selby won the fight 26:12, thus sealing a place as Great Britain's flyweight representative at the 2012 London Olympics.

=== Olympics ===
Selby's #1 ranking by AIBA meant he was seeded and was given a bye through the first round of the Olympic tournament. His first bout came against Ilyas Suliemenov of Kazakhstan, a stiff test for the Welshman, but one that he passed with relative ease, prevailing 19:15. In the quarterfinal Selby was pitted against the exciting young Cuban Robeisy Ramirez. He fell short to the eventual gold medalist 16:11, preventing Selby from earning a medal.

=== WSB ===
Selby competed in the 2012–13 World Series of Boxing season, representing the British Lionhearts. He boxed six times during his debut season in the WSB, remaining unbeaten throughout.

His first contest of the tournament was a home tie against Daniele Limone of the Dolce & Gabbana Italia Thunder at Celtic Manor Resort, Newport, Wales. Selby outclassed the Italian and won every round on all three judges' score-cards.

=== 2014 Commonwealth Games ===
Selby entered the games as gold medal favourite in the 52 kg Flyweight category, but lost his preliminary contest by a unanimous decision to 19-year-old Scottish boxer Reece McFadden. McFadden won the first round, and Selby took the second to have it all square going into the final round. Selby, however, was docked 2 points in round 3 for his gumshield repeatedly coming out, and as a result, would have needed a stoppage to win. The 3 judges' scorecards read 29:26 at the end in favour of the Scot.

== Professional boxing career ==
Andrew Selby made his professional debut on 30 October 2015 against Tanzanian Haji Juma in Newport, Wales. Selby stopped Juma 2 minutes into the fourth round. Selby claimed he will be ready for a shot at a world title after just 10 professional bouts. Selby won his second professional fight with a second-round stoppage of unbeaten Hungarian Jozsef Ajtai. "I thought we was going to come steaming in at me because he was a smaller guy but as soon as I landed a jab he knew I was too strong for him," said Selby. Selby went the distance for the first time in his third fight against Everth Briceño. Nevertheless, Selby comfortably outpointed his opponent.

After another win, Selby fought Shepshed-based Louis Norman for the BBBofC British flyweight title. Norman had previously held the English flyweight title. Selby cruised to a unanimous decision win (120-109, 120-109, 119-110) Selby won the IBF Inter-Continental flyweight title against Jake Bornea with a seventh round technical knockout. Selby claimed another minor title, the WBC International title, with a points victory (100-90, 100-90, 100-90) over journeyman Ardin Diale. Selby was scheduled to defend his British title against Kevin Satchell on 2016, but Satchell withdrew from the fight.

On 26 May 2017, Selby first touched the canvas against Cristofer Rosales. Rosales dropped Selby at the start of the fight. The Welsh boxer would recover and outwork Rosales to earn a unanimous decision (119-108, 118-109, 118-109). With the win, Selby became the mandatory challenger to WBC champion Daigo Higa. After the fight, Selby declared "I want to make money in life, so that is why I fight. At least I am honest. I've got a chance because I will be fighting for a world title. Who likes getting punched in the face? I don't. I just like the cheques."

Selby picked up another win on 7 October 2017 against Maximino Flores. The fight was characterized by both fighters showboating and Selby standing still for certain periods, which allowed Flores to hit him. Both fighters landed significant punches but were unable to hurt each other. As the fight went on, Selby's better technique and sharper work allowed him to outbox Flores and win a unanimous decision (119-109, 117-111, 117-112).

After a year-long layoff, Selbt returned to the ring with a dominant second round TKO win over Adam Yahaya. Selby unloaded a barrage of shots on his opponent near the end of the second round, which prompted the referee to end the fight with 12 seconds left to go in the round.

In his next fight, Selby traveled to Mexico to face Julio Cesar Martinez, in a WBC eliminator, with the winner facing WBC flyweight champion Charlie Edwards. Selby was ranked #1 by the WBC, as well as #8 by the WBO and #9 by the IBF, while Martinez was ranked #2 by the WBC. In the fifth round, Selby reached in to throw a straight right, but was met with two uppercuts and a left hook which sent Selby straight to the canvas. Selby wasn't able to beat the count and Martinez was awarded the victory.

On 15 November 2019, Selby vacated the British flyweight title. He announced his retirement from professional boxing in June 2020.

== Bare-knuckle boxing ==
In June 2026, Selby signed a multi-fight deal with BKB Bare Knuckle Boxing.

== Personal life ==
Andrew Selby is the younger brother of former IBF featherweight champion Lee Selby.

== Professional boxing record ==
14 fights	13 wins	1 loss
By knockout	7	1
By decision	6	0

No.	Result	Record	Opponent	Type	Round, time	Date	Location	Notes
14	Win	13–1	Fadhili Majiha	PTS	8	28 Sep 2019	Eagles Community Centre, Newcastle, England	
13	Win	12–1	Worawatchai Boonjan	TKO	1 (8), 1:38	13 Sep 2019	Caesars Palace Dubai, Dubai, UAE	
12	Loss	11–1	Julio Cesar Martinez	KO	5 (12), 0:57	23 Mar 2019	Centro de Espectáculos del Recinto Ferial, Metepec, Mexico	
11	Win	11–0	Adam Yahaya	TKO	2 (6), 2:48	27 Oct 2018	Newport Centre, Newport, Wales	
10	Win	10–0	Maximino Flores	UD	12	7 Oct 2017	York Hall, London, England	
9	Win	9–0	Cristofer Rosales	UD	12	26 May 2017	Motorpoint Arena, Cardiff, Wales	
8	Win	8–0	Ardin Diale	UD	10	4 Feb 2017	Lee Valley VeloPark, London, England	Won WBC International flyweight title
7	Win	7–0	Jake Bornea	TKO	7 (12), 2:54	18 Nov 2016	Wembley Arena, London, England	Won vacant IBF Inter-Continental flyweight title
6	Win	6–0	Felix Moncada	TKO	5 (10), 2:10	21 Oct 2016	Meadowbank Stadium, Edinburgh, Scotland	
5	Win	5–0	Louis Norman	UD	12	14 May 2016	Ice Arena Wales, Cardiff, Wales	Won vacant British flyweight title
4	Win	4–0	Brett Fidoe	TKO	6 (8), 1:57	11 Mar 2016	Newport Centre, Newport, Wales	
3	Win	3–0	Everth Briceno	PTS	6	5 Dec 2015	Westcroft Leisure Centre, Carshalton, England	
2	Win	2–0	Jozsef Ajtai	TKO	2 (8), 2:07	14 Nov 2015	City Academy Sports Centre, Bristol, England	
1	Win	1–0	Haji Juma	TKO	4 (8), 2:29	30 Oct 2015	Newport Centre, Newport, Wales	
