= Craig Derbyshire =

English boxer (born 1991)

Personal information
- Nickname: Dynamite
- Born: Craig Kevin Derbyshire; 2 July 1991 (age 35) Doncaster, Yorkshire, England
- Height: 5 ft 2 in (157 cm)
- Weight: Light-flyweight, Flyweight, Super-flyweight, Bantamweight

Boxing career
- Stance: Orthodox

Boxing record
- Total fights: 45
- Wins: 12
- Win by KO: 3
- Losses: 29
- Draws: 4

Craig Derbyshire (born 2 July 1991) is an English professional boxer who has held the Commonwealth light-flyweight title since 8 December 2023. He is also a two-time former English super-flyweight champion.

== Career ==
Having transitioned from Mixed Martial Arts and Muay Thai into boxing in 2014, Derbyshire lost his first nine pro-fights.

He had compiled a record of four wins, 20 loses and three draws when he defeated Anthony Smith on points to claim the vacant Central Area super-flyweight title at Leigh Sports Village on 10 June 2017.

Derbyshire lost the title on points to Tommy Frank in his first defense at IceSheffield on 27 April 2018, but bounced back to win the vacant Central Area bantamweight championship by stopping Lee Clayton in the fifth round of their contest at De Vere Whites in Bolton on 29 September 2018.

Dropping down to super-flyweight for his next outing, he won the vacant English title with a unanimous decision victory over Nathan Reeve at The Deco in Northampton on 25 May 2019.

Derbyshire lost the title in his first defense against Marcel Braithwaite at Bonus Arena in Hull on 26 October 2019, going down by majority decision.

After almost two years away from the ring, he reclaimed the belt in his next fight with a split decision success over Joe Maphosa at Rainton Meadows Arena in Houghton-le-Spring on 10 September 2021.

Once again switching weight divisions, Derbyshire challenged British flyweight champion Tommy Frank at the Magna Centre in Rotherham on 3 April 2022. The fight ended in a split draw with one ringside judge awarding him the bout 114–113 and a second favouring Frank 114–112, while the third saw it as a 114–114 tie.

Derbyshire faced Connor Butler for the vacant Commonwealth flyweight title at the Hilton Hotel Portamaso in St. Julian's, Malta on 25 February 2023. He lost via unanimous decision.

He won the biggest fight of his career to date by dethroning Commonwealth light-flyweight champion Matt Windle at Lions Centre in George Town, Cayman Islands, on 8 December 2023. Derbyshire inflicted heavy damage to his opponent throughout the contest which came to an end when Windle's corner halted the fight at the end of round five.

His first defense of the title took place at the Leisure Centre in Beverley on 11 October 2024, against Paul Roberts. Derbyshire kept hold of his belt thanks to a unanimous decision win.

Derbyshire made his second defense against Liam Dring at the Leisure Centre in Alfreton on 6 September 2025, winning via unanimous decision.
