= Commonwealth Boxing Council =

Professional boxing organisation

- Abbreviation: CBC
- Formation: 1954; 72 years ago (as The Empire and Commonwealth Championships Committee) 1997; 29 years ago (as Commonwealth Boxing Council)
- Type: Non-profit institution
- Purpose: Boxing sanctioning organisation
- Region served: Commonwealth
- President: Frederick Stirrup JP
- Affiliations: WBC
- Website: www.commbc.com

The Commonwealth Boxing Council (CBC) is a governing body that sanctions professional boxing bouts for territories within the Commonwealth, and is an affiliate of the WBC.

== History ==
The Commonwealth Boxing Council first started in 1954 as the Empire and Commonwealth Championships Committee, formed by the British Boxing Board of Control, to officially award a Commonwealth title. Before its formation, boxers from select territories within the British Empire fought for the 'Empire title', the first of such titles being awarded to British featherweight champion Jim Driscoll in 1908 after defeating Australian Charlie Griffin on points. In 1972, the Empire and Commonwealth Championships Committee was re-organised as the 'Commonwealth Championships Committee'. In 1997 the organisation was incorporated as a separate entity from the British Boxing Board of Control and renamed the Commonwealth Boxing Council.

In 2018, the first female version of the Commonwealth title was awarded to Anisha Basheel of Malawi on 15 June.

On 12 June 2023, a new championship, the Commonwealth “Silver” title, was created. This title works similarly to the British Boxing Board of Control English title, with the holders of both belts being subject to consideration of becoming mandatory challenger for the British and Commonwealth titles, as well as being fought for over 10 rounds. Mark Jeffers became the first fighter to win a Commonwealth Silver title when he defeated English super middleweight champion Zak Chelli in July 2023, while Jack Rafferty became the first fighter to have held both Commonwealth Silver and Commonwealth titles when he won the latter at super-lightweight in December 2023

== Current champions ==
=== Male ===
Weight class:	Champion:	Reign began:
Heavyweight	Moses Itauma	16 August 2025
Cruiserweight	vacant	
Light-heavyweight	Lewis Edmondson	19 October 2024
Super-middleweight	Troy Williamson	20 December 2025
Middleweight	George Liddard	17 October 2025
Super-welterweight	Bilal Fawaz	21 February 2026
Welterweight	Constantin Ursu	30 March 2025
Super-lightweight	Ben Marksby	14 November 2026
Lightweight	Louie O'Doherty	16 May 2026
Super-featherweight	Royston Barney-Smith	17 April 2026
Featherweight	Colm Murphy	31 March 2026
Super-bantamweight	Tyrone Buttigieg	28 March 2026
Bantamweight	Harvey Smith	22 November 2025
Super-flyweight	Matthew McHale	20 June 2025
Flyweight	Hamza Uddin	3 October 2026
Light-flyweight	Craig Derbyshire	8 December 2023

=== Female ===
Weight class:	Champion:	Reign began:
Super-welterweight	vacant	
Welterweight	vacant	
Super-lightweight	Sarah Achieng	16 December 2022
Lightweight	vacant	
Super-featherweight	Jade Pearce	20 June 2026
Featherweight	vacant	
Super-bantamweight	Tysie Gallagher	14 April 2023
Bantamweight	Megan Redstall	15 February 2026
Super-flyweight	Shannon Ryan	2 May 2026
Flyweight	vacant	
Light-flyweight	vacant	

== Member organisations ==
- Ghana Boxing Authority
- Kenya Professional Boxing
- Professional Boxing Control Board (Namibia)
- Nigeria Boxing Board of Control
- Boxing South Africa
- Uganda Professional Boxing Commission
- Tanzania Professional Boxing
- Zambia Professional Boxing and Wrestling Control Board
- Indian Boxing Council
- Australian National Boxing Federation
- New Zealand Professional Boxing Association
- Bahamas Boxing Commission
- Professional Boxing Association (Barbados)
- Guyana Boxing Board of Control
- Jamaica Boxing Board of Control
- Trinidad and Tobago Boxing Board
- British Boxing Board of Control
- National Championships Committee (Canada)

== See also ==
- List of boxing organisations
- List of Commonwealth Boxing Council champions
- List of Commonwealth Boxing Council female champions
