= Shinetsu Suzuki =

Japanese boxer (born 1939)

Personal information
- Nationality: Japanese
- Born: 10 May 1939 (age 87) Akita, Japan

Sport
- Sport: Boxing

Shinetsu Suzuki (鈴木 進悦, Suzuki Shinetsu; born 10 May 1939) is a Japanese boxer. He competed in the men's featherweight event at the 1960 Summer Olympics. At the 1960 Summer Olympics, he defeated Gaby Mancini of Canada, before losing to Jerzy Adamski of Poland.
