= Nathaniel Collins =

Scottish boxer (born 1996)

Personal information
- Nickname: The Nightmare
- Born: 12 August 1996 (age 30) Glasgow, Scotland
- Height: 5 ft 6 in (168 cm)
- Weight: Featherweight

Boxing career
- Stance: Southpaw

Boxing record
- Total fights: 20
- Wins: 17
- Win by KO: 8
- Losses: 2
- Draws: 1

Nathaniel Collins (born 12 August 1996) is a Scottish professional boxer. At regional level, he has held multiple featherweight championships, including the British and Commonwealth titles between 2021 and 2023; and challenged twice for the European title in 2025 and 2026.

== Professional career ==
Collins made his professional debut on 6 October 2018, scoring a four-round points decision (PTS) victory against Lee Connelly at the Lagoon Leisure Centre in Paisley, Scotland.

After compiling a record of 5–0 (1 KO), he faced Monty Ogilvie for the vacant Celtic featherweight title on 5 October 2019, at the Lagoon Leisure Centre. Collins scored five knockdowns en route to a fifth-round technical knockout (TKO) victory to capture his first professional championship.

After a points victory against Jordan Ellison in a non-title fight in January 2021, Collins faced Felix Williams for the vacant Commonwealth featherweight title on 31 July at the New Douglas Park in Hamilton, Scotland. Collins captured the title via third-round technical knockout.

Collins won the vacant British featherweight title by stopping James Beech Jnr in the seventh round of their fight in Glasgow on 10 March 2023 and the European Silver featherweight title with a unanimous decision win over defending champion Francesco Grandelli at York Hall in London on 11 May 2024.

He won the vacant WBC Silver featherweight title by stopping Lee McGregor in the fourth round at the SSE Hydro in Glasgow on 24 May 2025.

Collins challenged European featherweight champion Cristobal Lorente at Braehead Arena in Glasgow on 4 October 2025. The fight ended in a split draw.

A rematch between Collins and Lorente took place at the OVO Hydro in Glasgow on 17 April 2026. The fight was an eliminator for a shot at the WBC featherweight title with Lorente having vacated his European crown. Collins lost the bout, and his WBC Silver featherweight title, by split decision.

Collins challenged European featherweight champion Liam Davies at bp pulse LIVE in Birmingham on 26 September 2026. He was knocked to the canvas in the first round and, although he recovered to continue the fight, eventually lost when he was retired by his corner at the end of the seventh round.

== Professional boxing record ==
20 fights	17 wins	2 losses
By knockout	8	1
By decision	8	1
By disqualification	1	0
Draws	1	

No.	Result	Record	Opponent	Type	Round, time	Date	Location	Notes
20	Loss	17–2–1	Liam Davies	RTD	7 (12), 3:00	26 Sep 2026	bp pulse LIVE, Birmingham, England	For WBO Inter-Continental and European featherweight titles
19	Loss	17–1–1	Cristobal Lorente	SD	12	17 Apr 2026	The OVO Hydro, Glasgow, Scotland	Lost WBC Silver featherweight title
18	Draw	17–0–1	Cristobal Lorente	SD	12	4 Oct 2025	Braehead Arena, Glasgow, Scotland	Retained WBC Silver featherweight title; For European featherweight title
17	Win	17–0	Lee McGregor	TKO	4 (12), 1:45	24 May 2025	The SSE Hydro, Glasgow, Scotland	Won vacant WBC Silver featherweight title
16	Win	16–0	Darwing Martinez	PTS	8	14 Feb 2025	DoubleTree Hilton Hotel, Glasgow, Scotland	
15	Win	15–0	Francesco Grandelli	UD	12	11 May 2024	York Hall, London, England	Won European Silver featherweight title
14	Win	14–0	Zak Miller	MD	12	18 Nov 2023	Manchester Arena, Manchester, England	Retained British and Commonwealth featherweight titles
13	Win	13–0	Raza Hamza	KO	1 (12), 0:24	18 Aug 2023	York Hall, London, England	Retained British and Commonwealth featherweight titles
12	Win	12–0	James Beech Jnr	TKO	7 (12), 0:41	10 Mar 2023	DoubleTree Hilton Hotel, Glasgow, Scotland	Retained Commonwealth featherweight title; Won vacant British featherweight title
11	Win	11–0	Jacob Robinson	UD	12	13 May 2022	The SSE Hydro, Glasgow, Scotland	Retained Commonwealth featherweight title
10	Win	10–0	Uriel Lopez Juarez	RTD	3 (6), 3:00	18 Feb 2022	Trump Turnberry, Turnberry, Scotland	
9	Win	9–0	Thembani Mbangatha	KO	9 (12), 2:24	26 Nov 2021	Bolton Whites Hotel, Bolton, England	Retained Commonwealth featherweight title
8	Win	8–0	Felix Williams	TKO	3 (12)	31 Jul 2021	New Douglas Park, Hamilton, Scotland	Won vacant Commonwealth featherweight title
7	Win	7–0	Jordan Ellison	PTS	6	30 Jan 2020	St. Andrews Sporting Club, Glasgow, Scotland	
6	Win	6–0	Monty Ogilvie	TKO	5 (10), 0:54	5 Oct 2019	Lagoon Leisure Centre, Paisley, Scotland	Won vacant Celtic featherweight title
5	Win	5–0	Jose Hernandez	PTS	6	25 Apr 2019	Radisson Blu Hotel, Glasgow, Scotland	
4	Win	4–0	Taka Bembere	PTS	4	22 Mar 2019	Emirates Arena, Glasgow, Scotland	
3	Win	3–0	Ricky Starkey	DQ	3 (6), 1:18	31 Jan 2019	Radisson Blu Hotel, Glasgow, Scotland	Starkey disqualified for excessive holding
2	Win	2–0	Arturo Lopez	TKO	6 (6), 2:03	29 Nov 2021	Radisson Blu Hotel, Glasgow, Scotland	
1	Win	1–0	Lee Connelly	PTS	4	6 Oct 2018	Lagoon Leisure Centre, Paisley, Scotland	

Sporting positions
Regional boxing titles
Vacant Title last held by James Tennyson	Celtic featherweight champion 5 October 2019 – May 2022; Vacated	Vacant Title next held by Mark McKeown
Vacant Title last held by Leigh Wood	Commonwealth featherweight champion 31 July 2021 – September 2024; Vacated	Vacant Title next held by Masood Abdulah
Vacant Title last held by Leigh Wood	British featherweight champion 10 March 2023 – February 2025; Vacated	Vacant Title next held by Zak Miller
Preceded by Francesco Grandelli	European Silver featherweight champion 11 May 2024 – March 2025; Vacated	Vacant Title next held by Christ Esabe
Vacant Title last held by Bruce Carrington	WBC Silver featherweight champion 24 May 2025 – 17 April 2026	Succeeded by Cristobal Lorente
