= Cristobal Lorente =

Spanish boxer (born 1996)

Personal information
- Born: 25 March 1996 (age 30) Barcelona, Catalonia, Spain
- Height: 175 cm (5 ft 9 in)
- Weight: Featherweight

Boxing career
- Stance: Orthodox

Boxing record
- Total fights: 24
- Wins: 21
- Win by KO: 8
- Draws: 3

Cristobal Lorente (born 25 March 1996) is a Spanish professional boxer. At regional level, he has held multiple featherweight championships, including the European title from 2024 to February 2026; and previously, the Spanish title in 2021.

== Professional career ==
Undefeated with a record of 18 wins and a draw, Lorente won the European featherweight title by beating defending champion Mauro Forte on a majority decision in Tirana, Albania, on 11 July 2024.

He retained the belt by unanimous decision against Francesco Grandelli in Carbonia, Sardinia, Italy, on 13 December 2024.

Lorente made the second defense of his title against Ruben Gil at Palacio de Deportes y Congresos, Platja d'Aro, Spain, on 5 July 2025. He retained his championship when the fight ended as a split draw. One judge scored the bout in favour of each boxer and the third had it tied.

He defended his title against undefeated WBC Silver featherweight champion, Nathaniel Collins, at Braehead Arena in Glasgow, Scotland, on 4 October 2025. The fight ended in a split draw.

A rematch between Lorente and Collins took place at the OVO Hydro in Glasgow, Scotland, on 17 April 2026. The fight was an eliminator for a shot at the WBC featherweight title with Lorente having vacated his European crown. Lorente won by split decision to claim the WBC Silver featherweight title.

== Professional boxing record ==
24 fights	21 wins	0 losses
By knockout	8	0
By decision	13	0
Draws	3	

No.	Result	Record	Opponent	Type	Round, time	Date	Location	Notes
24	Win	21–0–3	Nathaniel Collins	SD	12	17 Apr 2026	OVO Hydro, Glasgow, Scotland	Won WBC Silver featherweight title
23	Draw	20–0–3	Nathaniel Collins	SD	12	4 Oct 2025	Braehead Arena, Glasgow, Scotland	Retained European featherweight title; For WBC Silver featherweight title
22	Draw	20–0–2	Ruben Gil	SD	12	5 Jul 2025	Palacio de Deportes y Congresos, Playa de Aro, Spain	Retained European featherweight title
21	Win	20–0–1	Francesco Grandelli	UD	12	13 Dec 2024	Palasport, Carbonia, Sardinia, Italy	Retained European featherweight title
20	Win	19–0–1	Mauro Forte	MD	12	11 Jul 2024	Skanderbeg Square, Tirana, Albania	Won European featherweight title
19	Win	18–0–1	Kevin Trana	UD	6	25 Nov 2023	Complex Esportiu Marina Besós, San Adrián del Besós, Spain	
18	Win	17–0–1	Elias Vega	UD	6	22 Jul 2023	Campo Municipal de Futbol Juventud 25 de Septiembre, Barcelona, Spain	
17	Win	16–0–1	Andoni Gago	TKO	3 (12)	11 Mar 2023	Centro Deportivo Municipal Mundet, Barcelona, Spain	Won vacant European Union featherweight title
16	Win	15–0–1	Lucas Montagne	RTD	5 (8), 3:00	8 Oct 2022	Centro Deportivo Municipal Mundet, Barcelona, Spain	
15	Win	14–0–1	Ricardo Martinez	TKO	8 (8)	26 Feb 2022	Centro Deportivo Municipal Mundet, Barcelona, Spain	
14	Win	13–0–1	Anuar Salas	UD	8	11 Sep 2021	Pavelló de la Vall d'Hebron, Barcelona, Spain	
13	Win	12–0–1	Juan Jesus Antunez	TKO	6 (10)	24 Jul 2021	Centro Deportivo Municipal Mundet, Barcelona, Spain	Won vacant Spanish featherweight title
12	Win	11–0–1	Dionis Martinez	KO	3 (4)	27 Mar 2021	Navarra Arena, Pamplona, Spain	
11	Win	10–0–1	Jayro Fernando Duran	UD	10	2 Nov 2019	Expocoruna, A Coruña, Spain	
10	Win	9–0–1	Bryan Carguacundo	UD	8	13 Apr 2019	Hotel Barceló Sants, Barcelona, Spain	
9	Win	8–0–1	Antonio Rodriguez	PTS	6	26 Jan 2019	Gimnasio No Limits, Barcelona, Spain	
8	Win	7–0–1	Ivan Ruiz Garrido	TKO	3 (6)	16 Jun 2018	Gimnasio No Limits, Barcelona, Spain	
7	Win	6–0–1	Edwin Tellez	PTS	6	8 Apr 2018	Gimnasio No Limits, Barcelona, Spain	
6	Win	5–0–1	Jose Hernandez	PTS	6	28 Jan 2018	Gimnasio No Limits, Barcelona, Spain	
5	Win	4–0–1	Patrik Kovac	TKO	1 (4)	25 Nov 2017	Centro Deportivo La Cogullada, Tarrasa, Spain	
4	Win	3–0–1	Yago Barros	PTS	4	8 Jul 2017	Pabellón Ricart, Sant Adrià de Besòs, Spain	
3	Win	2–0–1	Johnson Tellez	UD	4	28 Jan 2017	Gimnasio No Limits, Barcelona, Spain	
2	Draw	1–0–1	Goga Koshkelishvili	PTS	4	2 Oct 2016	Pabellón del Bon Pastor, Barcelona, Spain	
1	Win	1–0	Peter Balaz	TKO	1 (4)	2 Jul 2016	Pabellón del Bon Pastor, Barcelona, Spain	

Sporting positions
Regional boxing titles
Vacant Title last held by Carlos Ramos	Spanish featherweight champion 24 July 2021 – May 2023; Vacated	Vacant Title next held by Juan Jesus Antunez
Vacant Title last held by Mauro Forte	European Union featherweight champion 11 March 2023 – 11 July 2024; Vacated	Vacant
Preceded by Mauro Forte	European featherweight champion 11 July 2024 – March 2026; Vacated	Vacant Title next held by Liam Davies
Preceded by Nathaniel Collins	WBC Silver featherweight champion 17 April 2026 – present	Incumbent
