= Boxing at the 1960 Summer Olympics – Featherweight =

Olympic boxing tournament

Featherweight boxing at the Games of the XVII Olympiad
- Venue: Palazzo dello Sport
- Dates: 26 August – 5 September 1960
- Competitors: 31 from 31 nations

Medalists
| 1st place, gold medalist(s) | | Francesco Musso | Italy |
| 2nd place, silver medalist(s) | | Jerzy Adamski | Poland |
| 3rd place, bronze medalist(s) | | William Meyers | South Africa |
| 3rd place, bronze medalist(s) | | Jorma Limmonen | Finland |

The men's featherweight event was part of the boxing programme at the 1960 Summer Olympics. The weight class allowed boxers of up to 57 kilograms to compete. The competition was held from 26 August to 5 September 1960. 31 boxers from 31 nations competed.

== Competition format ==
The competition was a straight single-elimination tournament, with no bronze medal match (two bronze medals were awarded, one to each semifinal loser).

== Results ==
Results of the featherweight boxing competition.

=== Top half ===
Round of 32
Than Tun (BIR) | 0
William Meyers (RSA) | 5
Mohamed Hassan (MAR) | 1
Werner Kirsch (EUA) | 4
Joshua Williams (GHA) | 1
Constantin Gheorghiu (ROU) | 4
Ernst Chervet (SUI) | 3
Vicente Saldívar (MEX) | 2
Danny Males (AUS) | 0
Juan Díaz (CHI) | 5
Mohandas Liyanage Sumith (CEY) | 0
Jerzy Adamski (POL) | 5
Shinetsu Suzuki (JPN) | 5
Gaby Mancini (CAN) | 0

Round of 16
Hsu Teng-yun (ROC) | L
William Meyers (RSA) | KO-3
Werner Kirsch (EUA) | L
Constantin Gheorghiu (ROU) | WO
Ernst Chervet (SUI) | 4
Juan Díaz (CHI) | 1
Jerzy Adamski (POL) | 5
Shinetsu Suzuki (JPN) | 0

Quarterfinals
William Meyers (RSA) | 5
Constantin Gheorghiu (ROU) | 0
Ernst Chervet (SUI) | 0
Jerzy Adamski (POL) | 5

Semifinals
William Meyers (RSA) | 1
Jerzy Adamski (POL) | 4

=== Bottom half ===
Round of 32
José Luis Biescas (ESP) | 0
Abe Bekker (RHO) | 5
André Iuncker (FRA) | 2
Ando Reddy (IRL) | 3
Børge Krogh (DEN) | 0
Jorma Limmonen (FIN) | 5
Phil Lundgren (GBR) | 5
Sayed Abdel Gadir (SUD) | 0
Francesco Musso (ITA) | 4
Miloslav Paunović (YUG) | 1
Song Sun-cheon (KOR) | 3
Joe Okezie (NGR) | 2
Nick Spanakos (USA) | 0
Boris Nikonorov (URS) | 5
Carlos Aro (ARG) | 5
Lajos Baranyai (HUN) | 0

Round of 16
Abe Bekker (RHO) | 5
Ando Reddy (IRL) | 0
Jorma Limmonen (FIN) | 3
Phil Lundgren (GBR) | 2
Francesco Musso (ITA) | 5
Song Sun-cheon (KOR) | 0
Boris Nikonorov (URS) | 5
Carlos Aro (ARG) | 0

Quarter-finals
Abe Bekker (RHO) | 2
Jorma Limmonen (FIN) | 3
Francesco Musso (ITA) | 3
Boris Nikonorov (URS) | 2

Semi-finals
Jorma Limmonen (FIN) | 0
Francesco Musso (ITA) | 5

=== Finals ===
Semifinals
William Meyers (RSA) | 1
Jerzy Adamski (POL) | 4
Jorma Limmonen (FIN) | 0
Francesco Musso (ITA) | 5

Final
Jerzy Adamski (POL) | 1
Francesco Musso (ITA) | 4
