= Joshua Williams (boxer) =

Ghanaian boxer

Personal information
- Nationality: Ghanaian
- Born: 2 February 1941 (age 84); Accra, Ghana

Sport
- Sport: Boxing

Joshua Williams (born 2 February 1941) is a Ghanaian boxer. He competed in the men's featherweight event at the 1960 Summer Olympics. At the 1960 Summer Olympics, he lost to Constantin Gheorghiu of Romania.
