= Jorma Limmonen =

Finnish boxer

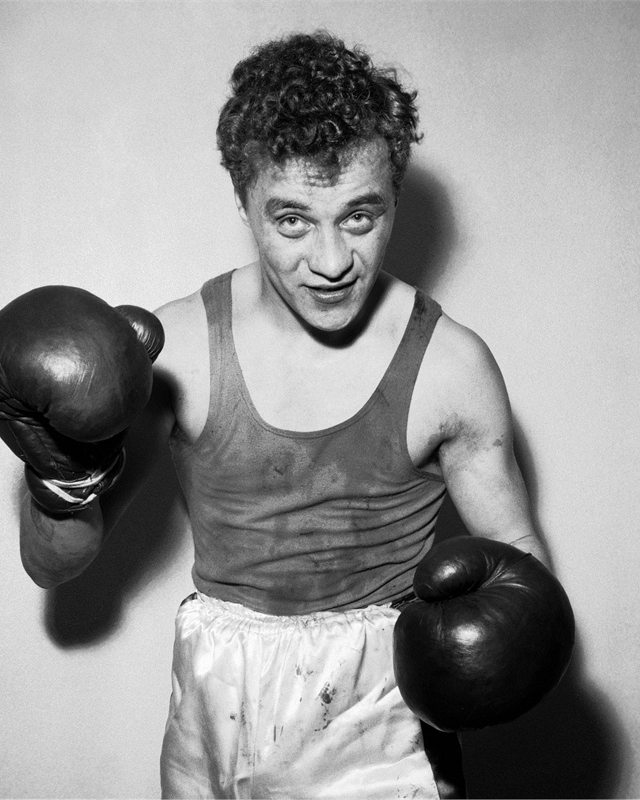

Personal information
- Born: 29 September 1934 Helsinki, Finland
- Died: 27 November 2012 (aged 76) Helsinki, Finland
- Height: 168 cm (5 ft 6 in)
- Weight: 52–60 kg (115–132 lb)

Sport
- Sport: Boxing
Medal record
Representing Finland
Olympic Games
Bronze medal – third place	1960 Rome	Featherweight

Jorma Johannes Limmonen (29 September 1934 – 27 November 2012) was a Finnish boxer who competed in the featherweight division in the 1960 and 1964 Olympics. He won a bronze medal in 1960, losing in a semifinal to the eventual champion Francesco Musso, and was eliminated in the second bout in 1964.

Limmonen won ten consecutive national titles in 1953–64, which remains a national record. He retired in 1964 and later worked as a boxing coach and a sports journalist. In 2006 he was inducted into the Finnish Boxing Hall of Fame.

== 1964 Olympic results ==
Jorma Limmonen competed as a featherweight in the 1964 Olympic boxing tournament in Tokyo. Here are his results from that event:

- Round of 32: defeated Jan de Rooj of the Netherlands (referee stopped contest)
- Round of 16 lost to Constantin Crudu of Romania by a 2-3 decision
