= Boris Nikonorov =

Soviet boxer (1939–2015)

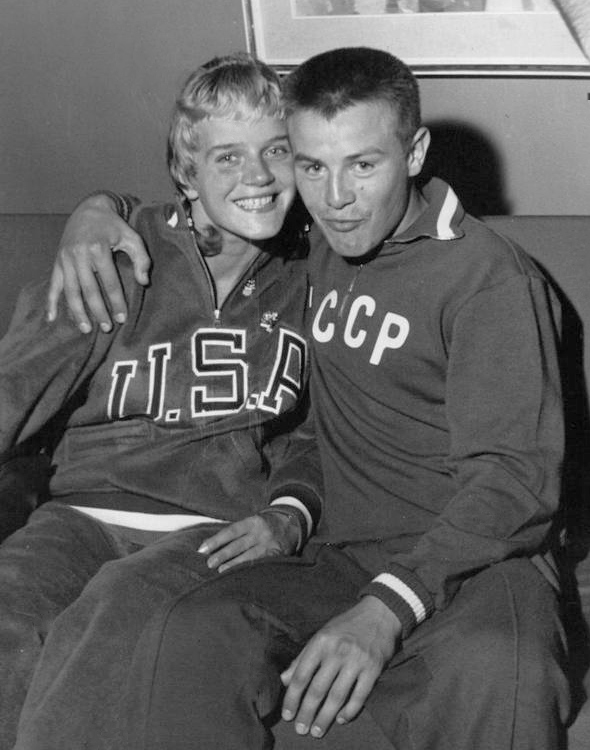
- Fuchs and Nikonorov at the 1960 Olympics

Personal information
- Born: 25 January 1939 Moscow, Russian SFSR, Soviet Union
- Died: 30 August 2015 (aged 76) Moscow, Russia
- Height: 160 cm (5 ft 3 in)

Sport
- Sport: Boxing
- Club: Trudovye Rezervy
- Coached by: Aleksandr Chebotaryov
Medal record
Representing the Soviet Union
European Championships
Silver medal – second place	1963 Moscow	-60 kg

Boris Nikolayevich Nikonorov (Russian: Борис Николаевич Никоноров, 25 January 1939 – 30 August 2015) was a Russian amateur boxer who won a silver medal in the featherweight division at the 1963 European Championships. He competed in the 1960 Summer Olympics, but lost in the third bout to the eventual winner Francesco Musso in a close decision (2:3). He withdrew from the 1964 Games due to an injury.

Nikonorov had to shed 10 kg of bodyweight for the 1960 Olympics and consequently felt dizzy through most of the games. He fainted after his first bout, despite winning it. At those games he was befriended by the American gymnast Doris Fuchs and later exchanged letters and gifts with her. Nikonorov spoke no English and was assisted by an interpreter. They met again in 1963, when American gymnasts visited Moscow for a Soviet-U.S. meet. Soviet authorities and the KGB intercepted and suppressed their mail, threatening Nikinorov with repercussions if he didn't stop communicating with Fuchs. After a long struggle, he was forced to oblige. Nikonorov still hoped to see her at the 1964 Olympics, but could not attend – a month before he broke his toe in a friendly football game. Later in 1989, when the Soviet union was crumbling and its citizens were finally allowed to leave the country, he traveled to the United States, but didn't meet Fuchs, as both were married by the time.

As a teenager Nikonorov wanted to become an association football player, but was rejected at various clubs because of his small size. He took up boxing in 1953. Four years later he won a Soviet junior title and was included to the national team. He retired in 1966 with an estimated record of 250 wins out of 265 bouts. During his career he won the Soviet championships in the featherweight (1959–60) and lightweight divisions (1962–63, 1965–66). In retirement he coached boxers in his club Trudovye Rezervy, and was also involved with the Bulgarian (1970–74) and Soviet (1989) national teams. His trainees included 1972 Olympic medalists Georgi Kostadinov and Angel Angelov.
