= Danny Males =

Australian boxer

Personal information
- Full name: Daniel William Males
- Nickname: Danny the Destroyer
- Nationality: Australian
- Born: 29 August 1941 (age 84) Kogarah, Australia
- Height: 1.68 cm (1 in)
- Weight: 56 kg (123 lb)

Sport
- Sport: Boxing

Daniel William "Danny" Males (born 29 August 1941) is an Australian former boxer.

He was a knock-out specialist and was nicknamed "Danny the Destroyer" and has won, as of June 1960, 14 out of his 15 fights on knock-outs. He was named a "class" boxer by The Canberra Times.

Males attended De La Salle College in Bankstown where he had his first experience in boxing winning a school bout. His real career started becoming a member of the Newtown Police Boys' Club in 1959 where he was trained by Jack Blom. He lived at the time with his family in Birrong.

Together with 3 other boxers he toured through New Zealand in 1959 boxing against top boxers. He competed in the men's featherweight event at the 1960 Summer Olympics. At the 1960 Summer Olympics in Rome, he lost to Juan Díaz of Chile by decision.

Males also played football with the Regents Park Rugby League teams. Males has a brother, who also did boxing, and two sisters.
