= Hsu Teng-yun =

Taiwanese boxer

Personal information
- Nationality: Taiwanese
- Born: 24 March 1936 (age 88); Kaohsiung, Taiwan

Sport
- Sport: Boxing

Hsu Teng-yun (born 24 March 1936) is a Taiwanese boxer. He competed in the men's featherweight event at the 1960 Summer Olympics. At the 1960 Summer Olympics, he lost to William Meyers of South Africa in the Round of 16 after receiving a bye in the Round of 32.
