= Riku Masuda (boxer) =

Japanese boxer (born 1997)

Riku Masuda 増田陸
Personal information
- Born: 23 September 1997 (age 29) Hiroshima, Japan
- Height: 5 ft 6 1/2 in (169 cm)
- Weight: Bantamweight

Boxing career
- Reach: 69 in (175 cm)
- Stance: Southpaw

Boxing record
- Total fights: 12
- Wins: 11
- Win by KO: 9
- Losses: 1

Riku Masuda (増田陸, Masuda Riku; born 23 September 1997) is a Japanese professional boxer who has held the WBA (Regular) bantamweight title since July 2026.

== Amateur career ==
Masuda represented and fought for Koryo High School in Hiroshima and Rikkyo University in Tokyo and is of the Teiken Boxing Gym stable. He fought a total of 66 amateur bouts, winning 54 and losing 12, on 2021 he passed the B-class test, thus, making him eligible to debut in a six-rounder bout when he turns professional.

== Professional career ==
=== Early career ===
On 2 July 2022, Masuda made his debut against Thai Worraphon Yothika in a six-rounds junior bantamweight bout in the Korakuen Hall. Masuda won via first-round KO within 1 minute and 50 seconds.

On his third bout, Masuda fought 12–2 national contender Fumiya Fuse (seldom named Ikuya Tomise in a few articles) in an eight-rounds bout in Tokyo, Japan at the "Naoya Inoue 4-Belt Unification Commemorative Monster Tournament" or the "Monster Tournament" (for short) qualifiers. Masuda knocked Fuse down in the first round before Fuse would take him into a grueling seven rounds until he prevailed via seventh-round TKO, thereby advancing Masuda into the semi-finals.

On 30 August 2023, for the "Monster Tournament" semi-finals and the Japanese Boxing Commission (JBC) bantamweight championship Masuda was scheduled against Seiya Tsutsumi in Tokyo, Japan. The bout would be intense and competitive, lasting full ten rounds before Masuda would fall short, losing via UD (97–93 and 96–94 twice).

In January 2024, Masuda was announced to be scheduled against former IBF world junior bantamweight world and WBO interim titles-challenger Jonas Sultan in an eight-rounds bout in Tokyo, Japan on 24 February 2024. Masuda scored a shock first-round KO with a singular left body shot that Sultan was unable to recover from, this is also the first time sultan was knocked down and lost via KO or TKO.

=== Japanese bantamweight champion ===
On 18 July 2024, Masuda rematched defending Japanese bantamweight champion Fumiya Fuse for the Japanese bantamweight championship in Tokyo, Japan. Masuda prevailed with a one-punch KO in the fourth-round, winning the Japanese bantamweight belt.

He made his first defence of the Japanese strap against unorthodox veteran Yoshihiro Utsumi on 2 November 2024, Masuda struggled to halt his foe early but had a dominant performance en route to a seventh-round TKO. He made his second defence against Kaisei Matsumoto on 1 March 2025. Masuda won via brutal sixth-round stoppage.

=== Rise up the ranks ===
On 8 June 2025 at the undercard of Junto Nakatani vs. Ryosuke Nishida, Masuda fought former IBO world bantamweight champion Michell Banquez in a ten-rounds bout in Tokyo, Japan. Masuda was victorious with a spectacular first-round KO, finishing Banquez in less than 90 seconds.

On 24 November 2025, Masuda faced the reigning WBC Latino bantamweight champion Jose Calderon at the "Prime Video Boxing 14" card in Tokyo, Japan. Masuda had a more difficult and contested experience with the 5'9 Calderon compared to his previous opponents, in the fifth-round, as Masuda threw a left shot, whilst Calderon threw a left uppercut at the same time, causing an accidental headbutt between the two opposite stances. The accidental headbutt, however, cut Calderon's right eye, which would prompt the ringside medical officials to halt the contest leading to a technical decision. When scorecards were tallied, one judged scored the bout 48–48 tie, but the other judges scored it 49–46 and 48–47 in favour of Masuda, result in a majority decision victory for Masuda.

==== Masuda vs. Donaire ====
In January 2026, Masuda, ranked number four by the World Boxing Association (WBA), was set to face four-division world champion legend Nonito Donaire, ranked number 1 by the WBA in a title eliminator on 15 March 2026 in Yokohama, Japan. Prior to the bout, Masuda expressed his gratitude to be able to fight the 43-years old legend Donaire, further expressing honour and respect. During the bout, Donaire, the more experienced between the two, fought technically, putting Masuda in a high-level bout, however, the younger Masuda would overwhelm him and his age en route to Donaire's corner throwing the towel amidst the eighth round of their ten-rounds bout.

=== WBA (Regular) bantamweight champion ===
==== Masuda vs. Higa ====
Masuda defeated Daigo Higa via split decision to win the vacant WBA (Regular) bantamweight title at Ryōgoku Kokugikan in Tokyo on 20 July 2026.

== Professional boxing record ==
12 fights	11 wins	1 loss
By knockout	9	0
By decision	2	1

No.	Result	Record	Opponent	Type	Round, time	Date	Location	Notes
12	Win	11–1	Daigo Higa	SD	12	20 Jul 2026	Ryōgoku Kokugikan, Tokyo, Japan	Won vacant WBA (Regular) bantamweight title
11	Win	10–1	Nonito Donaire	TKO	8 (10), 1:12	15 Mar 2026	Yokohama Buntai, Yokohama, Japan	
10	Win	9–1	José Miguel Calderón	TD	5 (10), 1:27	24 Nov 2025	Toyota Arena, Tokyo, Japan	Majority TD: Calderón cut due to an accidental headbutt
9	Win	8–1	Michell Banquez	KO	1 (10), 1:27	8 Jun 2025	Ariake Coliseum, Tokyo, Japan	
8	Win	7–1	Kaisei Matsumoto	TKO	6 (10), 2:18	1 Mar 2025	Korakuen Hall, Tokyo, Japan	Retained Japanese bantamweight title
7	Win	6–1	Yoshihiro Utsumi	TKO	7 (10), 0:26	2 Nov 2024	Korakuen Hall, Tokyo, Japan	Retained Japanese bantamweight title
6	Win	5–1	Fumiya Fuse	KO	4 (10), 2:21	18 Jul 2024	Korakuen Hall, Tokyo, Japan	Won Japanese bantamweight title
5	Win	4–1	Jonas Sultan	KO	1 (8), 2:21	24 Feb 2024	Ryōgoku Kokugikan, Tokyo, Japan	
4	Loss	3–1	Seiya Tsutsumi	UD	10	30 Aug 2023	Korakuen Hall, Tokyo, Japan	For Japanese bantamweight title; Monster Bantamweight Tournament semifinals
3	Win	3–0	Fumiye Fuse	TKO	7 (8), 3:00	20 May 2023	Sumida City Gymnasium, Tokyo, Japan	Monster Bantamweight Tournament qualifiers
2	Win	2–0	An Jeong-ho	KO	1 (6), 2:25	3 Dec 2022	Paradise City Plaza, Incheon, South Korea	
1	Win	1–0	Worraphon Yothika	KO	1 (6), 1:50	2 Jul 2022	Korakuen Hall, Tokyo, Japan	

== See also ==
- List of male boxers
- List of southpaw stance boxers
- Boxing in Japan
- List of Japanese boxing world champions
- List of world bantamweight boxing champions

Sporting positions
Regional boxing titles
Vacant Title last held by Fumiya Fuse	Japanese bantamweight champion July 18, 2024 – 2025; Vacated	Vacant Title next held by Shori Umezu
World boxing titles
Vacant Title last held by Antonio Vargas as Champion	WBA bantamweight champion Regular Title; July 20, 2026 – present	Incumbent
