= Miloslav Paunović =

Serbian boxer (born 1938)

Personal information
- Nationality: Serbian
- Born: 20 April 1938 (age 86); Belgrade, Yugoslavia

Sport
- Sport: Boxing

Miloslav Paunović (born 20 April 1938) is a Serbian boxer. He competed in the men's featherweight event at the 1960 Summer Olympics. At the 1960 Summer Olympics, he lost to Francesco Musso of Italy.
