= Lee McGregor =

Scottish boxer (born 1996)

Personal information
- Nickname: Lightning
- Born: 24 December 1996 (age 29) Edinburgh, Scotland
- Height: 5 ft 7 1/2 in (171 cm)
- Weight: Bantamweight; Super-bantamweight; Featherweight

Boxing career
- Stance: Orthodox

Boxing record
- Total fights: 21
- Wins: 16
- Win by KO: 11
- Losses: 4
- Draws: 1

Lee McGregor (born 24 December 1996) is a Scottish professional boxer. He has challenged once for the IBO super-bantamweight title in 2023. At regional level, he held the European, British, and Commonwealth bantamweight titles between 2018 and 2023.

== Professional career ==
McGregor made his professional debut on 11 November 2017, scoring a first-round technical knockout (TKO) victory against Stefan Sashev at the Royal Highland Centre in Edinburgh.

After compiling a record of 3–0 (3 KOs), he defeated Goodluck Mrema via second-round TKO to capture the vacant IBF Youth bantamweight title on 23 June 2018, at the SSE Hydro in Glasgow.

His next fight came against former Commonwealth flyweight champion Thomas Essomba on 13 October at the York Hall in London, with the vacant Commonwealth bantamweight title on the line. McGregor captured the title via twelfth-round knockout (KO) victory in only his fifth professional bout. Following a points decision (PTS) victory against Brett Fidoe in a non-title fight in May 2019, Mcgregor made the first defence of his Commonwealth title, defeating Scott Allan via eighth-round TKO on 22 June at the Emirates Arena in Glasgow.

McGregor returned to the Emirates Stadium for his next fight, facing British bantamweight champion and fellow Scot, Kash Farooq, on 16 November in a unification fight for the British and Commonwealth titles. In what was described by media outlets as a "controversial decision", McGregor emerged victorious via twelve-round split decision (SD) with two judges scoring the bout 115–112 and 114–113 in favour of McGregor, while the third judge scored it 114–113 to Farooq.

Following a TKO victory against Ryan Walker in a non-title fight in August 2020, McGregor sought to add another title to his collection by challenging reigning champion Karim Guerfi for the European bantamweight title on 19 March 2021, at the Whites Hotel in Bolton, England. McGregor knocked his opponent to the canvas three times in the first round. Guerfi made it back to his feet on all three occasions, however, the referee called a halt to the contest after the third knockdown at 2:43 of the round.

McGregor made his first European bantamweight title defense against Vincent Legrand on 6 August 2021, at the Falls Park in Belfast, Northern Ireland, on the undercard of the WBA interim featherweight title clash between Michael Conlan and T. J. Doheny. McGregor had a poor start to the fight, as he was knocked down in the second round, but successfully rallied back to knock Legrand out in the fourth round.

Switching weight divisions, he faced Erik Robles Ayala for the vacant IBO super-bantamweight title at Meadowbank Stadium in Edinburgh on 21 July 2023, losing via unanimous decision.

McGregor defeated Isaac Lowe via unanimous decision on 21 December 2024, at Kingdom Arena in Riyadh, Saudi Arabia as part of the undercard for the heavyweight world title rematch between Oleksandr Usyk and Tyson Fury.

He faced Nathaniel Collins for the vacant WBC Silver featherweight title at the SSE Hydro in Glasgow on 24 May 2025. McGregor lost by stoppage in the fourth round.

On 16 May 2026, he fought Michael Gomez Jr. for the vacant WBA International lightweight title at the Keepmoat Stadium in Doncaster, England. Having been knocked to the canvas in the fourth round, McGregor lost by technical knockout in the sixth round when his corner threw in the towel after he came under a barrage of unanswered blows.

McGregor lost via unanimous decision to Rhys Edwards at Utilita Arena in Cardiff, Wales, on 20 November 2026, in a bout for the vacant WBA Continental featherweight title.

== Professional boxing record ==
21 fights	16 wins	4 losses
By knockout	11	2
By decision	5	2
Draws	1	

No.	Result	Record	Opponent	Type	Round, time	Date	Location	Notes
21	Loss	16–4–1	Rhys Edwards	UD	10	20 Nov 2026	Utilita Arena, Cardiff, Wales	For vacant WBA Continental featherweight title
20	Loss	16–3–1	Michael Gomez Jr.	TKO	6 (10), 2:37	16 May 2026	Keepmoat Stadium, Doncaster, England	For vacant WBA International lightweight title
19	Win	16–2–1	Emiliano Leonel Araujo	PTS	6	13 Mar 2026	DoubleTree Hilton Hotel, Glasgow, Scotland	
18	Loss	15–2–1	Nathaniel Collins	TKO	4 (12), 1:45	24 May 2025	The SSE Hydro, Glasgow, Scotland	For vacant WBC Silver featherweight title
17	Win	15–1–1	Isaac Lowe	UD	10	21 Dec 2024	Kingdom Arena, Riyadh, Saudi Arabia	Won vacant WBC International featherweight title
16	Win	14–1–1	Deiner Polo	TKO	3 (6), 1:56	4 Oct 2024	Caledonia Gladiators Arena, East Kilbride, Scotland	
15	Win	13–1–1	Jorge Moya	TKO	2 (8), 0:21	18 May 2024	DoubleTree Hilton Hotel, Glasgow, Scotland	
14	Loss	12–1–1	Erik Robles Ayala	UD	12	21 Jul 2023	Meadowbank Stadium, Edinburgh, Scotland	For vacant IBO super bantamweight title
13	Win	12–0–1	Alexis Boureima Kabore	PTS	8	4 Mar 2023	Newcastle Arena, Newcastle, England	
12	Draw	11–0–1	Diego Alberto Ruiz	PTS	10	11 Feb 2022	York Hall, London, England	
11	Win	11–0	Vincent Legrand	KO	4 (12), 1:23	6 Aug 2021	Falls Park, Belfast, Northern Ireland	Retained European bantamweight title
10	Win	10–0	Karim Guerfi	TKO	1 (12), 2:43	19 Mar 2021	Bolton Whites Hotel, Bolton, England	Won European bantamweight title
9	Win	9–0	Ryan Walker	TKO	5 (10), 0:16	26 Aug 2020	Production Park Studios, South Kirkby, England	
8	Win	8–0	Ukashir Farooq	SD	12	16 Nov 2019	Emirates Arena, Glasgow, Scotland	Retained Commonwealth bantamweight title; Won British bantamweight title
7	Win	7–0	Scott Allan	TKO	8 (12), 1:45	22 Jun 2019	Emirates Arena, Glasgow, Scotland	Retained Commonwealth bantamweight title
6	Win	6–0	Brett Fidoe	PTS	6	18 May 2019	The SSE Hydro, Glasgow, Scotland	
5	Win	5–0	Thomas Essomba	KO	12 (12), 1:38	13 Oct 2018	York Hall, London, England	Won vacant Commonwealth bantamweight title
4	Win	4–0	Goodluck Mrema	TKO	4 (10), 2:18	23 Jun 2018	The SSE Hydro, Glasgow, Scotland	Won vacant IBF Youth bantamweight title
3	Win	3–0	Pablo Narvaez	TKO	2 (8), 1:19	3 Mar 2018	The SSE Hydro, Glasgow, Scotland	
2	Win	2–0	Kamil Jaworek	TKO	2 (4), 1:52	2 Dec 2017	Leicester Arena, Leicester, England	
1	Win	1–0	Stefan Sashev	TKO	1 (4), 2:53	11 Nov 2017	Royal Highland Centre, Edinburgh, Scotland	

Sporting positions
Regional boxing titles
Vacant Title last held by Aaron Bobadilla	IBF Youth bantamweight champion 23 June 2018 – ? Vacated	Vacant
Vacant Title last held by Jason Moloney	Commonwealth bantamweight champion 13 October 2018 – February 2023; Vacated	Vacant Title next held by Sean McGoldrick
Preceded by Ukashir Farooq	British bantamweight champion 16 November 2019 – February 2023; Vacated	Vacant Title next held by Sean McGoldrick
Preceded by Karim Guerfi	European bantamweight champion 19 March 2021 – October 2022; Vacated	Vacant Title next held by Alessio Lorusso
Vacant Title last held by Luca Rigoldi	WBC International featherweight champion 21 December 2024 – September 2025; Vacated	Vacant Title next held by Michael Conlan
