= Joe Okezie =

Nigerian boxer

Personal information
- Nationality: Nigerian
- Born: 1 May 1937 (age 89) Umuahia, Nigeria

Sport
- Sport: Boxing

Joseph Okezie // (born 1 May 1937) is a Nigerian boxer. He competed in the men's featherweight event at the 1960 Summer Olympics.
