= Daigo Higa =

Japanese boxer (born 1995)

Daigo Higa 比嘉大吾
Personal information
- Born: August 9, 1995 (age 31) Urasoe, Okinawa, Japan
- Height: 5 ft 4 in (163 cm)
- Weight: Flyweight; Bantamweight

Boxing career
- Reach: 64 in (163 cm)
- Stance: Orthodox

Boxing record
- Total fights: 28
- Wins: 21
- Win by KO: 19
- Losses: 4
- Draws: 3

Daigo Higa (比嘉 大吾, Higa Daigo; born August 9, 1995) is a Japanese professional boxer who held the WBC flyweight title from 2017 to 2018. He also challenged for the WBO bantamweight title title in 2024 and for the WBA bantamweight title twice in 2025.

== Amateur career ==
Higa turned pro at the age of 18, after a brief amateur career where he accrued a 36–8 record.

== Professional career ==
Higa's manager is Boxing Hall of Fame member Yoko Gushiken. Higa made his professional debut in June 2014, defeating Saengkeng Saknarong by technical knockout less than a minute into the first round. He won his first title by stopping previously undefeated Thai fighter Kongfah CP Freshmart in 7 rounds to claim the WBC Youth flyweight title. He went on to defend that title twice before claiming the OPBF flyweight belt against Filipino gatekeeper Ardin Diale. Higa broke down and battered Diale with body shots, eventually stopping him in round 4.

=== Higa vs. Hernandez ===
On 2017, Higa won a world championship in his first try, defeating Juan Hernández by technical knockout to become the WBC flyweight title. Hernández had won the title earlier that year against Nawaphon Por Chokchai and was scheduled to make his first defense against Higa. However, he lost his belt at the scales due to coming in over the weight limit. Higa dominated Hernández, dropping him five times over the course over the fight before the referee finally stopped the contest. With the win, Higa became Okinawa's first boxing world champion since Akinobu Hiranaka.

After becoming a world champion, Higa said his goals were facing WBA champion Kazuto Ioka in a flyweight unification bout and breaking Japan's record of 15 consecutive knockouts.

=== Higa vs. Rosales ===
On 15 April 2018, Higa defended his WBC flyweight title for the third time in a row against challenger Cristofer Rosales. Higa lost the fight and his belt via TKO in the ninth round.

=== Higa vs. Tsutsumi ===
On 26 October 2020, Higa fought Seiya Tsutsumi. The fight ended in a majority draw, one judge scoring it in favour of Higa, 96-94, while the other two judges saw the fight as a draw, scoring it 95-95.

=== Higa vs. Kobayashi ===
On 31 December 2020, Higa fought Yuki Kobayashi, who was ranked #9 by the IBF and #14 by the WBO at bantamweight. Higa won via a fifth-round knockout.

=== Higa vs. Tsutsumi ===
Higa was scheduled to challenge Seiya Tsutsumi for his WBA bantamweight title at Ariake Arena in Tokyo, Japan on February 24, 2025. The fight ended in a draw with all three judges scoring it 114–114.

=== Higa vs. Vargas ===
Higa fought Antonio Vargas on July 30, 2025 in Yokahama, Japan. The fight ended in a draw, with all three judges scoring the fight 113-113. Higa announced his retirement from boxing the following day.

=== Higa vs. Masuda ===
Higa faced Riku Masuda for the vacant WBA (Regular) bantamweight title at Ryōgoku Kokugikan in Tokyo on 20 July 2026, via split decision.

== Professional boxing record ==
28 fights	21 wins	4 losses
By knockout	19	1
By decision	2	3
Draws	3	

No.	Result	Record	Opponent	Type	Round, time	Date	Location	Notes
28	Loss	21–4–3	Riku Masuda	SD	12	20 Jul 2026	Ryōgoku Kokugikan, Tokyo, Japan	For vacant WBA (Regular) bantamweight title
27	Draw	21–3–3	Antonio Vargas	UD	12	30 Jul 2025	Yokohama Cultural Gymnasium, Yokohama, Japan	For WBA bantamweight title
26	Draw	21–3–2	Seiya Tsutsumi	UD	12	24 Feb 2025	Ariake Arena, Tokyo, Japan	For WBA bantamweight title
25	Loss	21–3–1	Yoshiki Takei	UD	12	3 Sep 2024	Ariake Arena, Tokyo, Japan	For WBO bantamweight title
24	Win	21–2–1	Nawaphon Kaikanha	KO	4 (10), 2:29	31 Dec 2023	Ota City General Gymnasium, Tokyo, Japan	
23	Win	20–2–1	Yodmongkol CP Freshmart	KO	4 (10), 1:34	24 Jun 2023	Ota City General Gymnasium, Tokyo, Japan	
22	Win	19–2–1	Songsaeng Phoyaem	UD	10	15 Nov 2022	Korakuen Hall, Tokyo, Japan	
21	Win	18–2–1	Froilan Saludar	SD	8	13 Jul 2022	Ota City General Gymnasium, Tokyo, Japan	
20	Loss	17–2–1	Ryosuke Nishida	UD	12	24 Apr 2021	Convention Center, Ginowan, Japan	Lost WBO Asia Pacific bantamweight title
19	Win	17–1–1	Yuki Strong Kobayashi	TKO	5 (12), 0:45	31 Dec 2020	Ota City General Gymnasium, Tokyo, Japan	Won WBO Asia Pacific bantamweight title
18	Draw	16–1–1	Seiya Tsutsumi	MD	10	26 Oct 2020	Korakuen Hall, Tokyo, Japan	
17	Win	16–1	Jason Buenaobra	TKO	6 (8), 2:25	13 Feb 2020	Korakuen Hall, Tokyo, Japan	
16	Loss	15–1	Cristofer Rosales	TKO	9 (12), 1:42	15 Apr 2018	Yokohama Arena, Yokohama, Japan	WBC flyweight title at stake only for Rosales, Higa missed weight
15	Win	15–0	Moisés Fuentes	KO	1 (12), 2:32	4 Feb 2018	Prefectural Budokan, Naha, Japan	Retained WBC flyweight title
14	Win	14–0	Thomas Masson	TKO	7 (12), 1:10	22 Oct 2017	Ryōgoku Kokugikan, Tokyo, Japan	Retained WBC flyweight title
13	Win	13–0	Juan Hernández	TKO	6 (12), 2:58	20 May 2017	Ariake Coliseum, Tokyo, Japan	Won vacant WBC flyweight title
12	Win	12–0	Diomel Diocos	TKO	4 (10), 2:29	4 Feb 2017	Korakuen Hall, Tokyo, Japan	
11	Win	11–0	Felipe Cagubcob Jr.	KO	4 (12), 2:55	5 Nov 2016	Korakuen Hall, Tokyo, Japan	Retained OPBF flyweight title
10	Win	10–0	Ardin Diale	KO	4 (12), 2:39	2 Jul 2016	Korakuen Hall, Tokyo, Japan	Won OPBF flyweight title
9	Win	9–0	Romel Oliveros	KO	2 (10), 2:19	5 Apr 2016	Korakuen Hall, Tokyo, Japan	Retained WBC Youth flyweight title
8	Win	8–0	Renren Tesorio	TKO	10 (10), 2:05	7 Nov 2015	Korakuen Hall, Tokyo, Japan	Retained WBC Youth flyweight title
7	Win	7–0	Kongfah CP Freshmart	KO	7 (10), 1:01	24 Jul 2015	Siam Paradise Entertainment Centre, Bangkok, Thailand	Won vacant WBC Youth flyweight title
6	Win	6–0	Cris Alfante	KO	4 (6), 0:37	8 Jun 2015	Korakuen Hall, Tokyo, Japan	
5	Win	5–0	Virden Rivera	KO	2 (6), 2:55	10 May 2015	Korakuen Hall, Tokyo, Japan	
4	Win	4–0	Pongpayu Chaiyonggym	TKO	2 (6), 1:36	12 Jan 2015	Culture Center, Hongcheon, South Korea	
3	Win	3–0	Keisuke Fujji	TKO	1 (4), 1:20	26 Nov 2014	Korakuen Hall, Tokyo, Japan	
2	Win	2–0	Rotthang Wor Por Srisaket	TKO	2 (4), 2:40	22 Aug 2014	Korakuen Hall, Tokyo, Japan	
1	Win	1–0	Saengkeng Saknarong	TKO	1 (4), 0:50	17 Jun 2014	Korakuen Hall, Tokyo, Japan	

== Exhibition boxing record ==
1 fight	0 wins	0 losses
Non-scored	1	

No.	Result	Record	Opponent	Type	Round, time	Date	Location	Notes
1	—N/a	0–0 (1)	Naoya Inoue	—N/a	3	11 Feb 2021	Yoyogi National Gymnasium, Tokyo, Japan	Non-scored bout

== See also ==
- Boxing in Japan
- List of Japanese boxing world champions
- List of world flyweight boxing champions

Sporting positions
Regional boxing titles
Vacant Title last held by Kongputorn CP Freshmart	WBC Youth flyweight champion July 24, 2015 – May 20, 2017; Won world title	Vacant Title next held by Kento Hatanaka
Preceded by Ardin Diale	OPBF flyweight champion July 2, 2016 – May 20, 2017; Won world title	Vacant Title next held by Keisuke Nakayama
Preceded by Yuki Strong Kobayashi	WBO Asia Pacific bantamweight champion December 31, 2020 – April 24, 2021	Succeeded by Ryosuke Nishida
World boxing titles
Vacant Title last held by Juan Hernández	WBC flyweight champion May 20, 2017 – April 14, 2018; Stripped, did not make weight	Vacant Title next held by Cristofer Rosales
