= Juan Hernández (Mexican boxer) =

Mexican boxer

Personal information
- Nickname: Juanito / Churritos
- Nationality: (Mexico) Mexican
- Born: Juan Hernández Navarrete; 24 February 1987 (age 39) Morelia, Mexico
- Height: 5 ft 2 1/2 in (159 cm)
- Weight: Minimumweight; Flyweight

Boxing career
- Reach: 65 1/2 in (166 cm)
- Stance: Orthodox

Boxing record
- Total fights: 41
- Wins: 37
- Win by KO: 28
- Losses: 4

Juan Hernandez Navarrete (born 24 February 1987) is a Mexican professional boxer who held the WBC flyweight title in 2017.

== Professional career ==
Hernández turned professional in 2004 and compiled a record of 18–1 before unsuccessfully challenging Japanese fighter Kazuto Ioka for his WBC minimumweight title. Hernández would get a second title opportunity, this time in the flyweight division for the newly vacated WBC title. He would travel to Thailand to take on and beat local fighter Nawaphon Kaikanha to be crowned champion.

== Professional boxing record ==
41 fights	37 wins	4 losses
By knockout	28	3
By decision	8	1
By disqualification	1	0

No.	Result	Record	Opponent	Type	Round, time	Date	Location	Notes
41	Win	37–4	Josue Portales	TKO	8 (10), 2:10	19 Mar 2021	Auditorio Municipal, Torreón, Mexico	Won vacant WBC FECARBOX bantamweight title
40	Win	36–4	Adrian Pacheco Rodriguez	TKO	1 (10), 1:19	15 Nov 2019	Salon Sagitario, Ciudad Nezahualcóyotl, Mexico	
39	Loss	35–4	Joel Cordova	RTD	5 (10), 3:00	18 May 2019	Deportivo del Sindicato del Metro, Mexico City, Mexico	
38	Win	35–3	Julio Cesar Castillo	KO	4 (8), 2:43	22 Dec 2018	Auditorio Fausto Gutierrez Moreno, Tijuana, Mexico	
37	Loss	34–3	Daigo Higa	TKO	6 (12), 2:58	20 May 2017	Ariake Coliseum, Kōtō, Japan	WBC flyweight title at stake; Only for Higa after Hernández missed weight
36	Win	34–2	Nawaphon Kaikanha	TKO	3 (12), 2:29	4 Mar 2017	National Stadium Gymnasium, Bangkok, Thailand	Won vacant WBC flyweight title
35	Win	33–2	Dixon Flores	RTD	3 (10), 3:00	13 Aug 2016	Auditorio Benito Juárez, Veracruz, Mexico	
34	Win	32–2	Omar Niño Romero	KO	2 (10), 0:16	11 Jun 2016	Arena Coliseo, Mexico City, Mexico	
33	Win	31–2	Luis Carrillo	KO	1 (10), 2:02	9 Apr 2016	Auditorio Benito Juárez, Veracruz, Mexico	
32	Win	30–2	Jesús Silvestre	TKO	2 (10), 2:34	6 Feb 2016	Arena Coliseo, Mexico City, Mexico	
31	Win	29–2	Raymond Tabugon	TKO	5 (8), 2:35	14 Nov 2015	Auditorio Miguel Barragan, San Luis Potosi, Mexico	
30	Win	28–2	Ramón García Hirales	UD	8	15 Aug 2015	Estadio de Beisbol Alberto Vega Chavez, Guamuchil, Mexico	
29	Win	27–2	Iran Diaz	KO	3 (10), 0:48	27 Mar 2015	Gimnasio Municipal, Ciudad Obregon, Mexico	
28	Win	26–2	Fernando Curiel	TKO	4 (8)	20 Dec 2014	Jose Cuervo Salon, Polanco, Mexico	
27	Win	25–2	Jesus Straffon	UD	8	9 Aug 2014	Arena Monterrey, Monterrey, Mexico	
26	Win	24–2	Adolfo Pena	TKO	5 (6), 2:55	3 May 2014	Palenque de la Feria Ganadera, Culiacan, Mexico	
25	Win	23–2	Saúl Juárez	PTS	8	12 Oct 2013	Hard Rock Hotel, Puerto Vallarta, Mexico	
24	Win	22–2	Josue Vega	KO	3 (8), 0:35	13 Apr 2013	Monumental Plaza de Toros, Ciudad Hidalgo, Mexico	
23	Win	21–2	Angel Rezago	RTD	4 (10), 3:00	27 Oct 2012	Arena del Alba, Aguascalientes, Mexico	
22	Win	20–2	Lorenzo Trejo	KO	2 (10), 2:30	21 Jul 2012	Auditorio Ernesto Rufo, Rosarito, Mexico	
21	Win	19–2	Ulises Lara	UD	8	3 Mar 2012	Gimnasio German Evers, Mazatlan, Mexico	
20	Loss	18–2	Kazuto Ioka	UD	12	10 Aug 2011	Korakuen Hall, Tokyo, Japan	For WBC strawweight title
19	Win	18–1	Moisés Fuentes	SD	12	5 Feb 2011	Sala de Armas, Mexico City, Mexico	NABF strawweight title at stake only for Fuentes after Hernández missed weight
18	Win	17–1	Denver Cuello	DQ	3 (12)	22 May 2010	Auditorio Plaza Condesa, Mexico City, Mexico	
17	Win	16–1	Armando Vazquez	KO	1 (12)	27 Feb 2010	Jose Cuervo Salon, Polanco, Mexico	Retained NABF strawweight title
16	Win	15–1	Arcadio Salazar	KO	2 (12), 1:33	1 Jul 2009	Woda Night Club, Lomas de Sotelo, Mexico	Retained NABF strawweight title
15	Win	14–1	Sammy Reyes	KO	3 (12), 1:30	13 Mar 2009	Salon Marbet Plus, Ciudad Nezahualcoyotl, Mexico	Retained NABF strawweight title
14	Win	13–1	Job Solano	KO	1 (12)	4 Apr 2008	Salon Marbet Plus, Ciudad Nezahualcoyotl, Mexico	Retained NABF strawweight title
13	Win	12–1	Ivan Meneses Flores	TKO	8 (12), 0:42	19 Jul 2007	Vive Cuervo Salon, Mexico City, Mexico	Retained NABF strawweight title
12	Win	11–1	Gabriel Ramirez Anaya	SD	10	11 May 2007	Salon 21, Mexico City, Mexico	
11	Win	10–1	Tirso Hernandez Morales	KO	1 (12), 1:37	8 Dec 2006	Sindicato de Taxistas, Cancun, Mexico	Won vacant NABF strawweight title
10	Win	9–1	Ivan Meneses Flores	TKO	2 (8), 1:42	26 Oct 2006	Palacio Videmar, Tlatelolco, Mexico	
9	Win	8–1	Rafael Bruno	TKO	1 (8), 1:41	27 Apr 2006	Salon 21, Mexico City, Mexico	
8	Loss	7–1	Oscar Martinez	KO	8 (10)	1 Mar 2006	Salon Emperador, Iztacalco, Mexico	
7	Win	7–0	Sandro Rodriguez	KO	1 (8)	27 Aug 2005	Salon Fascinacion, Mexico City, Mexico	
6	Win	6–0	Adrian Nieto	TKO	4 (6)	20 Apr 2005	Salon Fascinacion, Mexico City, Mexico	
5	Win	5–0	Gabriel Ramirez Anaya	UD	6	9 Feb 2005	Salon Fascinacion, Mexico City, Mexico	
4	Win	4–0	Mariano Rodriguez	KO	1 (6)	30 Oct 2004	Auditorio Municipal, Chalco, Mexico	
3	Win	3–0	Oscar Saturnino	KO	1 (4), 1:58	22 Jul 2004	Salon 21, Mexico City, Mexico	
2	Win	2–0	Marcelo Gerardo Lopez	TKO	2 (4), 2:17	17 Jun 2004	Salon 21, Mexico City, Mexico	
1	Win	1–0	Juan Daniel Salvidar	UD	4	25 Mar 2004	Salon 21, Mexico City, Mexico	

== See also ==
- List of flyweight boxing champions
- List of Mexican boxing world champions

Achievements
Vacant Title last held by Román González	WBC flyweight champion Mar 4, 2017 - May 19, 2017; Stripped	Vacant Title next held by Daigo Higa
