= Ernst Chervet =

Swiss boxer (1940–2016)

Personal information
- Nationality: Swiss
- Born: 27 September 1940 Bern, Switzerland
- Died: 5 October 2016 (aged 76)

Sport
- Sport: Boxing

Ernst Chervet (27 September 1940 – 5 October 2016) was a Swiss boxer. He competed in the men's featherweight event at the 1960 Summer Olympics. Although he did not win a medal, Chervet defeated future professional champion Vicente Saldivar in his first bout of the Rome tournament.

== 1960 Olympic results ==
- Round of 32: defeated Vicente Saldivar (Mexico) by decision, 3–2
- Round of 16: defeated Juan Diaz (Chile) by decision, 4–1
- Quarterfinal: lost to Jerzy Adamski (Poland) by decision, 0-5
