= Phil Lundgren =

British boxer (1940–2015)

Personal information
- Nationality: British
- Born: 2 January 1940 London, England
- Died: 17 April 2015 (aged 75)

Sport
- Sport: Boxing

Phil Lundgren (2 January 1940 – 17 April 2015) was a British boxer. He competed in the men's featherweight event at the 1960 Summer Olympics.

Lundgren won the 1960 Amateur Boxing Association British featherweight title, when boxing out of the Fisher ABC.
