= Seiya Tsutsumi =

Japanese boxer (born 1995)

Seiya Tsutsumi 堤聖也
Personal information
- Born: December 24, 1995 (age 30) Kumamoto, Japan
- Height: 5 ft 5 1/2 in (166 cm)
- Weight: Bantamweight

Boxing career
- Reach: 64 1/2 in (164 cm)
- Stance: Orthodox

Boxing record
- Total fights: 16
- Wins: 13
- Win by KO: 8
- Draws: 3

Seiya Tsutsumi (堤聖也) (born December 24, 1995) is a Japanese professional boxer. He is a two-time World Boxing Association (WBA) bantamweight champion having held the title since December 2025 until May 2026. and previously from 2024 to 2025.

== Boxing career ==
=== Early career ===
Tsutsumi made his professional debut on March 27, 2018, winning the bout by KO in the first round.

Then, in September 2019, Tsutsumi transferred to Kakuebi Geki Boxing Gym. After that, he entered the GOD'S LEFT bantamweight tournament as a seed in the first round and entered the semi-finals, and was scheduled to compete in the semi-finals against Kenya Yamashita at Korakuen Hall on November 9 of the same year, but the match was canceled due to Yamashita's withdrawal. He advanced to the finals with a bye.

On January 28, 2020, Tsutsumi faced Kazuki Nakajima, ranked 6th in the Japanese bantamweight division, in the tournament final. The match ended in a majority draw at 0-1 (75–77, 76–76, 76–76) after 8 rounds.

On October 26, 2020, Tsutsumi faced Daigo Higa, a former WBC world flyweight champion. The fight ended in a majority draw, one judge scoring it in favour of Higa, 96–94, while the other two judges saw the fight as a draw, scoring it 95-95.

=== Japanese bantamweight champion ===
On June 23, 2022, Tsutsumi fought against Japanese bantamweight champion Kyosuke Sawada. He won the bout by TKO at 47 seconds in the 8th round, successfully winning the title.

On October 20, 2022, in his first Japanese bantamweight title defense, Tsutsumi faced Kenshin Oshima, the 6th ranked Japanese bantamweight. He won the by TKO at 2 minutes and 42 seconds in the 9th round, successfully defending his title for the first time.

On March 20, 2023, in his next Japanese bantamweight title match, Tsutsumi faced Minamide, the No. 1 ranked Japanese bantamweight. He won by TKO at 1 minute 41 seconds in the seventh round, successfully defending his title for the second time. In addition, his opponent Minamide retired from active duty after this match.

On March 31, 2023, it was announced that Tsutsumi would be seeded in the first round and participate in the semi-finals of the Ohashi Boxing Gym's Monster Tournament.

Tsutsumi faced Kazuki Anaguchi on December 26, 2023, on the undercard of Naoya Inoue vs Marlon Tapales. He won the bout by unanimous decision after four knockdowns during the bout to successfully defend his Japanese bantamweight belt. Anaguchi never regained consciousness, dying six weeks later.

Tsutsumi vacated the Japanese bantamweight title on January 6, 2024, in order to pursue a world bantamweight title.

=== WBA bantamweight champion ===
==== Tsutsumi vs. Inoue ====
Tsutsumi challenged Takuma Inoue for his WBA bantamweight title at Ariake Arena in Tokyo, Japan on October 13, 2024. He won the fight and the title by unanimous decision.

==== Tsutsumi vs. Higa ====
Tsutsumi made the first defense of his WBA bantamweight title against Daigo Higa at Ariake Arena in Tokyo, Japan on February 24, 2025. The fight ended in a draw with all three judges scoring it 114–114.

==== Tsutsumi vs. Donaire ====
On March 26, 2025, the WBA ordered Tsutsumi and interim champion Antonio Vargas to hold a unification bout for the WBA World Bantamweight Championship. Negotiations were due to end on April 25, 2025, and if no agreement was reached, a bidding process would be held. While standard WBA rules require a champion to defend their title against a designated challenger within 120 days of acquiring the new belt, the uncertainty surrounding Tsutsumi's designated challenger and the expiration of the designated title defense period led to the decision to hold the unification bout against Vargas. On May 13, 2025, however, Tsutsumi announced on social media that he had undergone surgery to treat a two-year-old left eye condition, preventing him from competing in the unification bout scheduled for July of the same year. As a result, the WBA designated Tsutsumi as champion in recess effective May 17, 2025. He is the third Japanese boxer to hold a world title and have been recognized as a champion in recess by the WBA, following Tomonobu Shimizu and Koki Kameda. Thus, interim champion Vargas was promoted to regular champion on the same day.

Tsutsumi is scheduled to face WBA interim bantamweight champion Nonito Donaire in a title unification bout at the Ryogoku Kokugikan on December 17, 2025. He was originally scheduled to fight WBA regular champion Antonio Vargas, but Vargas was unable to fight due to the death of his mother, and on December 1, the WBA declared Vargas champion in recess and Tsutsumi was reinstated as champion. Tsutsumi defended the title by split decision.

== Professional boxing record ==
16 fights	13 wins	0 losses
By knockout	8	0
By decision	5	0
Draws	3	

No.	Result	Record	Opponent	Type	Round, time	Date	Location	Notes
16	Win	13–0–3	Nonito Donaire	SD	12	Dec 17, 2025	Kokugikan, Tokyo, Japan	Retained WBA bantamweight title
15	Draw	12–0–3	Daigo Higa	UD	12	Feb 24, 2025	Ariake Arena, Tokyo, Japan	Retained WBA bantamweight title
14	Win	12–0–2	Takuma Inoue	UD	12	Oct 13, 2024	Ariake Arena, Tokyo, Japan	Won WBA bantamweight title
13	Win	11–0–2	Weerawat Noolae	TKO	4 (10), 1:13	Jul 7, 2024	Ryōgoku Kokugikan, Tokyo, Japan	
12	Win	10–0–2	Kazuki Anaguchi	UD	10	Dec 26, 2023	Ariake Arena, Tokyo, Japan	Retained Japanese bantamweight title; Anaguchi passed away from a subdural hematoma six weeks later
11	Win	9–0–2	Riku Masuda	UD	10	Aug 30, 2023	Korakuen Hall, Tokyo, Japan	Retained Japanese bantamweight title
10	Win	8–0–2	Jin Minamide	TKO	9 (10), 1:41	Mar 20, 2023	Korakuen Hall, Tokyo, Japan	Retained Japanese bantamweight title
9	Win	7–0–2	Kenshin Oshima	TKO	9 (10), 2:42	Oct 20, 2022	Korakuen Hall, Tokyo, Japan	Retained Japanese bantamweight title
8	Win	6–0–2	Kyosuke Sawada	TKO	8 (10), 0:47	Jun 23, 2022	Korakuen Hall, Tokyo, Japan	Won Japanese bantamweight title
7	Draw	5–0–2	Daigo Higa	MD	10	Oct 26, 2020	Korakuen Hall, Tokyo, Japan	
6	Draw	5–0–1	Kazuki Nakajima	MD	8	Jan 28, 2020	Korakuen Hall, Tokyo, Japan	GOD’S LEFT Bantamweight Tournament Final
5	Win	5–0	Ryan Rey Ponteras	TKO	1 (8), 1:52	Apr 14, 2022	City Sogo Gym, Kōshi, Japan	
4	Win	4–0	Jiaqi Yu	UD	6	Oct 14, 2018	Xiedao Hotel, Beijing, China	
3	Win	3–0	Junpei Inamoto	TKO	1 (6), 1:35	Sep 4, 2018	Korakuen Hall, Tokyo, Japan	
2	Win	2–0	Yutthana Narkprasert	KO	1 (6), 1:14	Jun 17, 2018	Meenayothin Camp, Bangkok, Thailand	B Class Tournament 2018 Bantamweight Final
1	Win	1–0	Alongkon Kaisi	KO	1 (6), 1:31	Mar 27, 2018	Korakuen Hall, Tokyo, Japan	

== See also ==
- List of male boxers
- Boxing in Japan
- List of Japanese boxing world champions
- List of world bantamweight boxing champions

Sporting positions
Regional boxing titles
Preceded by Kyosuke Sawada	Japanese bantamweight champion 23 June 2022 – 2024; Vacated	Vacant Title next held by Fumiya Fuse
World boxing titles
Preceded by Takuma Inoue	WBA bantamweight champion 13 October 2024 – 17 May 2025; Status changed	Succeeded by Antonio Vargas; Interim champion promoted
Preceded by Antonio Vargas; Status changed	WBA bantamweight champion 1 December 2025 – 31 May 2026; Status changed	Succeeded by Antonio Vargas; Status changed
Honorary boxing titles
New title	WBA bantamweight champion In recess 17 May 2025 – 1 December 2025; Reinstated	Succeeded by Antonio Vargas; Status changed
Preceded by Antonio Vargas; Status changed	WBA bantamweight champion In recess 31 May 2026 – present	Incumbent
