= Dixon Flores =

Nicaraguan boxer

Personal information
- Born: Dicson Joan Velásquez Flores; 2 July 1994 (age 32) Juigalpa, Chontales, Nicaragua
- Height: 165 cm (5 ft 5 in)
- Weight: Super flyweight; Bantamweight

Boxing career
- Stance: Orthodox

Boxing record
- Total fights: 34
- Wins: 17
- Win by KO: 6
- Losses: 12
- Draws: 3
- No contests: 2

Dixon Flores (born 2 July 1994 in Juigalpa, Chontales) is a Nicaraguan professional boxer who challenged for the WBC super flyweight title in 2015.

== Professional boxing record ==
34 fights	17 wins	12 losses
By knockout	6	7
By decision	11	5
Draws	3	
No contests	2	

No.	Result	Record	Opponent	Type	Round, time	Date	Location	Notes
34	Loss	17–12–3 (2)	(Nicaragua) Freddy Lainez	TKO	1 (10)	18 Feb 2023	Puerto Salvador Allende, Managua, Nicaragua	
33	Loss	17–11–3 (2)	(Dominican Republic) Luis Moncion Ventura	TKO	6 (8)	2 Dec 2022	Puerto Salvador Allende, Managua, Nicaragua	
32	Loss	17–10–3 (2)	(Dominican Republic) Luis Aguero	KO	1 (10) 0:38	2 Apr 2022	Pabellon de Esgrima, Santo Domingo, Dominican Republic	For WBA Fedecaribe bantamweight title
31	Loss	17–9–3 (2)	(Mexico) Cristopher Rodríguez	UD	10	6 Feb 2022	Centro de Convenciones, Cancún, Mexico	
30	Loss	17–8–3 (2)	(United Kingdom) Liam Davies	UD	10	9 Oct 2021	Utilita Arena, Birmingham, United Kingdom	For WBC International Silver super bantamweight title
29	Win	17–7–3 (2)	(Nicaragua) Bryan Perez	KO	1 (6) 2:50	15 Sep 2020	Nuevo Gimnasio Nicarao, Managua, Nicaragua	
28	Loss	16–7–3 (2)	(Australia) Jason Moloney	KO	2 (10) 1:26	15 Nov 2019	Margaret Court Arena, Melbourne, Australia	For WBA Oceania bantamweight title
27	Win	16–6–3 (2)	(Nicaragua) Alexander Espinoza	TKO	2 (8) 2:37	23 Aug 2019	Nuevo Gimnasio Nicarao, Managua, Nicaragua	
26	NC	15–6–3 (2)	(Nicaragua) Bryan Perez	NC	1 (8)	16 Mar 2019	Centro Mil Colores, El Crucero, Nicaragua	Fight stopped due to cut above Flores' left eye
25	Draw	15–6–3 (1)	(Nicaragua) Jordan Rodriguez	MD	8	1 Dec 2018	Nuevo Gimnasio Nicarao, Managua, Nicaragua	
24	Loss	15–6–2 (1)	(Nicaragua) Alexander Taylor	UD	6	17 Nov 2018	Nuevo Gimnasio Nicarao, Managua, Nicaragua	
23	NC	15–5–2 (1)	(Nicaragua) Sergio Gonzalez	NC	2 (6)	29 Jul 2017	Nuevo Gimnasio Nicarao, Managua, Nicaragua	Fight stopped due to cut above Gonzalez' right eye
22	Win	15–5–2	(Nicaragua) Ismael Fernandez	UD	6	1 Jul 2017	Nuevo Gimnasio Nicarao, Managua, Nicaragua	
21	Win	14–5–2	(Nicaragua) Marcio Soza	UD	8	19 Nov 2016	Gimnasio Alexis Argüello, Juigalpa, Nicaragua	
20	Loss	13–5–2	(Mexico) Juan Hernández	RTD	3 (10)	13 Aug 2016	Auditorio Benito Juárez, Veracruz, Mexico	
19	Win	13–4–2	(Nicaragua) Marlon Prado	UD	6	15 Jul 2016	Polideportivo Augusto C. Sandino, El Rosario Carazo, Nicaragua	
18	Loss	12–4–2	(United Kingdom) Kal Yafai	KO	1 (12)	5 Mar 2016	Genting Arena, Birmingham, West Midlands, United Kingdom	For vacant WBA Inter-Continental super flyweight title
17	Win	12–3–2	(Nicaragua) Jose Perez	TKO	2 (8)	5 Dec 2015	Gimnasio Multiusos del IND, Managua, Nicaragua	
16	Loss	11–3–2	(Mexico) Carlos Cuadras	TKO	5 (12), 1:11	15 Aug 2015	Estadio de Beisbol Alberto Vega Chavez, Guamuchil, Sinaloa, Mexico	For WBC super flyweight title
15	Win	11–2–2	(Nicaragua) Carlos Rueda	UD	6	21 Feb 2015	Complejo Deportivo Alexis Arguello, Juigalpa, Nicaragua	
14	Win	10–2–2	(Costa Rica) Bairon Rostran	KO	1 (6)	30 Jan 2015	Centro de Convenciones Hotel Hex, Managua, Nicaragua	
13	Win	9–2–2	(Nicaragua) Benjamin Mendoza	KO	1 (6)	22 Nov 2014	Gimnasio Alexis Arguello, Managua, Nicaragua	
12	Win	8–2–2	(Nicaragua) Jose Flores	TKO	6 (6)	1 Nov 2014	Gimnasio Alexis Arguello, Managua, Nicaragua	
11	Draw	7–2–2	(Nicaragua) Jose Rios	MD	10	30 Aug 2014	Cancha Multiuso Santo Tomas, Chontales, Nicaragua	For Nicaraguan bantamweight title
10	Loss	7–2–1	(Nicaragua) Frederick Castro	SD	6	5 Jul 2014	Gimnasio de Nindiri, Masaya, Nicaragua	
9	Win	7–1–1	(Nicaragua) Wesling Polanco	UD	6	14 Jun 2014	Polideportivo Miguel Obando y Bravo, La Libertad, Chontales, Nicaragua	
8	Win	6–1–1	(Nicaragua) Edwin Tellez	UD	6	26 Apr 2014	Polideportivo Augusto C. Sandino, El Rosario Carazo, Nicaragua	
7	Win	5–1–1	(Nicaragua) Rene Conde	UD	6	22 Mar 2014	Gimnasio Municipal Guy Rouck Chavez, Matagalpa, Nicaragua	
6	Win	4–1–1	(Nicaragua) David Cerda	UD	4	22 Feb 2014	Polideportivo Miguel Obando e Bravo, La Libertad, Nicaragua	
5	Win	3–1-1	(Nicaragua) Evert Molina	UD	4	24 Nov 2013	Casa De La Cultura, Masatepe, Nicaragua	
4	Win	2–1–1	(Nicaragua) Julio Bendana	UD	4	19 Oct 2013	Gimnasio Alexis Argüello, Managua, Nicaragua	
3	Win	1–1–1	(Nicaragua) Aron Juarez	MD	4	28 Sep 2013	La Cancha del Parque, Santo Domingo, Nicaragua	
2	Loss	0–1–1	(Nicaragua) Alexander Taylor	UD	4	29 Jun 2013	Centro de Convenciones Crowne Plaza, Managua, Nicaragua	
1	Draw	0–0–1	(Nicaragua) Francisco Gonzalez	UD	4	18 May 2013	Gimnasio Alexis Argüello, Managua, Nicaragua	
