= Antonio Vargas (boxer) =

American boxer (born 1996)

Personal information
- Born: August 15, 1996 (age 30) Houston, Texas, U.S.
- Height: 5 ft 5 1/2 in (166 cm)
- Weight: Bantamweight

Boxing career
- Reach: 66 in (168 cm)
- Stance: Orthodox

Boxing record
- Total fights: 23
- Wins: 19
- Win by KO: 11
- Losses: 2
- Draws: 1
- No contests: 1
Medal record
Men's Amateur boxing
Representing United States
Pan American Games
Gold medal – first place	2015 Toronto	Flyweight

Antonio Vargas (born August 15, 1996) is an American professional boxer. He held the World Boxing Association (WBA) bantamweight title from May 2025 until June 2026. As an amateur, Vargas competed for the United States at the 2016 Summer Olympics and won a gold medal in the flyweight division at the 2015 Pan American Games.

== Early life ==
Vargas was born in Houston, Texas, to Mexican-Puerto Rican parents and raised in Kissimmee, Florida.

== Amateur career ==
Vargas won a gold medal at the 2015 Pan American Games in the flyweight event.

He competed at the 2016 Summer Olympics, losing in the round of 16 to Shakhobidin Zoirov of Uzbekistan.

== Professional career ==
Vargas defeated Winston Guerrero by technical knockout in the 10th round to win the interim WBA bantamweight title at Caribe Royale in Orlando, Florida, on December 13, 2024.

He was elevated to full WBA bantamweight champion on May 17, 2025, when reigning title holder, Seiya Tsutsumi, was designated champion in recess due to a long-term injury.

On July 30, 2025, Vargas made the first defense of the title against Daigo Higa at Yokohama Cultural Gymnasium in Yokohama, Japan, with the fight ending in a unanimous draw.

In his second defense he faced Jesse Rodriguez at Desert Diamond Arena in Glendale, Arizona on June 13, 2026, losing by knockout in the sixth round.

== Professional boxing record ==
23 fights	19 wins	2 losses
By knockout	11	2
By decision	8	0
Draws	1	
No contests	1	

No.	Result	Record	Opponent	Type	Round, time	Date	Location	Notes
23	Loss	19–2–1 (1)	Jesse Rodriguez	KO	6 (12), 1:15	Jun 13, 2026	Desert Diamond Arena, Glendale, Arizona, U.S.	Lost WBA bantamweight title
22	Draw	19–1–1 (1)	Daigo Higa	UD	12	Jul 30, 2025	Yokohama Cultural Gymnasium, Yokohama, Japan	Retained WBA bantamweight title
21	Win	19–1 (1)	Winston Guerrero	TKO	10 (12), 2:10	Dec 13, 2024	Caribe Royale Orlando, Orlando, Florida, U.S.	Won WBA interim bantamweight title
20	Win	18–1 (1)	Jonathan Rodriguez	RTD	7 (12), 3:00	Feb 24, 2024	Caribe Royale Orlando, Orlando, Florida, U.S.	
19	Win	17–1 (1)	Hernán Márquez	UD	10	Oct 27, 2023	Caribe Royale Orlando, Orlando, Florida, U.S.	
18	NC	16–1 (1)	Francisco Pedroza Portillo	NC	3 (10)	May 12, 2023	Caribe Royale Orlando, Orlando, Florida, U.S.	
17	Win	16–1	Michell Banquez	TKO	6 (10), 2:38	Feb 25, 2023	Caribe Royale Orlando, Orlando, Florida, U.S.	
16	Win	15–1	Jesus Martinez	TKO	3 (6), 2:59	Oct 15, 2022	Caribe Royale Orlando, Orlando, Florida, U.S.	
15	Win	14–1	Samuel Gutierrez Hernandez	TKO	5 (6), 2:38	Aug 21, 2022	Caribe Royale Orlando, Orlando, Florida, U.S.	
14	Win	13–1	Daniel Alberto Coronel	TKO	4 (6), 1:24	Jul 23, 2022	Caribe Royale Orlando, Orlando, Florida, U.S.	
13	Win	12–1	Juan Centeno	UD	6	Feb 21, 2020	Miccosukee Resort & Gaming, Miami, Florida, U.S.	
12	Win	11–1	Szilveszter Kanalas	KO	1 (6), 2:38	Nov 23, 2019	Bryan Glazer Family JCC Auditorium, Tampa, Florida, U.S.	
11	Loss	10–1	Jose Maria Cardenas	KO	1 (8), 1:53	May 25, 2019	Osceola Heritage Park, Kissimmee, Florida, U.S.	
10	Win	10–0	Lucas Rafael Baez	KO	2 (8), 2:08	Feb 22, 2019	Osceola Heritage Center, Kissimmee, Florida, U.S.	
9	Win	9–0	Jorge Perez	UD	8	Nov 16, 2018	Osceola Heritage Center, Kissimmee, Florida, U.S.	Won vacant NABF (junior) bantamweight title
8	Win	8–0	Felipe Rivas	UD	6	Aug 28, 2018	Cancha Ruben Zayas Montanez, Trujillo Alto, Puerto Rico	
7	Win	7–0	Aaron Lopez	UD	6	Jul 28, 2018	Kissimmee Civic Center, Kissimmee, Florida, U.S.	
6	Win	6–0	Luis Saavedra	UD	6	Feb 23, 2018	Osceola Heritage Center, Kissimmee, Florida, U.S.	
5	Win	5–0	Jonathan Garza	UD	6	Nov 3, 2017	Osceola Heritage Center, Kissimmee, Florida, U.S.	
4	Win	4–0	Miguel Rebullosa	TKO	2 (6), 1:11	Oct 13, 2017	A La Carte Event Pavilion, Tampa, Florida, U.S.	
3	Win	3–0	Leonardo Reyes	UD	6	Jul 7, 2017	A La Carte Event Pavilion, Tampa, Florida, U.S.	
2	Win	2–0	Emilio Rivera	KO	1 (4), 1:52	Apr 21, 2017	Osceola Heritage Center, Kissimmee, Florida, U.S.	
1	Win	1–0	Jonathan De La Paz	TKO	1 (4), 1:48	Feb 24, 2017	Tony Rosa Community Center, Palm Bay, Florida, U.S.	

== See also ==
- List of male boxers
- List of Mexican boxing world champions
- List of Puerto Rican boxing world champions
- List of world bantamweight boxing champions

Sporting positions
Amateur boxing titles
Previous: Stephen Fulton	Golden Gloves flyweight champion 2014–2015	Next: Diego Álvarez
Previous: Malik Jackson	U.S. bantamweight champion 2015	Next: Efraín Sánchez
Regional boxing titles
New title	NABF Junior bantamweight champion November 16, 2018 – 2019; Vacated	Vacant Title next held by Juan Martinez Ayala
World boxing titles
Vacant Title last held by Reymart Gaballo	WBA bantamweight champion Interim title December 13, 2024 – May 17, 2025; Promoted	Vacant Title next held by Nonito Donaire
Preceded by Seiya Tsutsumi; Status changed	WBA bantamweight champion May 17, 2025 – December 1, 2025; Status changed	Succeeded by Seiya Tsutsumi
Preceded by Seiya Tsutsumi; Status changed	WBA bantamweight champion May 31, 2026 – June 13, 2026; Lost bid for Super title	Vacant Title next held by Riku Masuda as Regular champion
Honorary boxing titles
Vacant Title last held by Seiya Tsutsumi	WBA bantamweight champion In recess December 1, 2025 – May 31, 2026; Reinstated	Vacant Title next held by Seiya Tsutsumi
