= Lajos Baranyai =

Hungarian boxer

Personal information
- Nationality: Hungarian
- Born: 8 January 1939; Budapest, Hungary
- Died: 11 August 1999 (aged 60)

Sport
- Sport: Boxing

Lajos Baranyai (8 January 1939 – 11 August 1999) was a Hungarian boxer. He competed in the men's featherweight event at the 1960 Summer Olympics.
