= Liam Davies (boxer) =

English boxer (born 1996)

Personal information
- Born: 31 March 1996 (age 30) Donnington, Telford, Shropshire, England
- Height: 1.77 m (5 ft 10 in)
- Weight: Bantamweight; Super-bantamweight; Featherweight

Boxing career
- Reach: 182 cm (72 in)
- Stance: Orthodox

Boxing record
- Total fights: 20
- Wins: 19
- Win by KO: 10
- Losses: 1
Medal record
Men's Amateur boxing
ABAE National Championships
Silver medal – second place	2016 Liverpool	Bantamweight
Silver medal – second place	2018 London	Bantamweight
Box Cup
Silver medal – second place	2017 Haringey	Bantamweight

Liam Davies (born 31 March 1996) is a British professional boxer. He held the International Boxing Organization (IBO) super-bantamweight title in 2024. At regional level, he has held the European featherweight title since March 2026. Previously, he held the British and European super-bantamweight titles between 2022 and 2023.

== Amateur career ==
After an amateur career that included winning silver medals at the 2016 and 2018 England Boxing National Amateur Championships,

== Professional career ==
Davies made his professional debut on 9 December 2018, defeating Khvicha Gigolashvili on points over four rounds at the Holiday Inn in Birmingham.

In his eighth pro-fight he won his first title by beating Sean Cairns via corner retirement for the vacant English bantamweight championship at Wembley Arena in London on 21 November 2020.

Davies signed with Frank Warren's Queensberry Promotions in June 2021.

Moving up in weight divisions, he claimed the vacant WBC International Silver super-bantamweight title by securing a unanimous decision win against Dixon Flores at Arena Birmingham on 9 October 2021.

On 11 June 2022 at the International Centre in Telford, Davies defeated defending champion Marc Leach for the British super-bantamweight title via unanimous decision.

At the same venue on 19 November 2022, he challenged WBC International champion, Ionut Baluta, with the vacant European super-bantamweight title also on the line. Davies won by unanimous decision.

Again at the International Centre, he defended his titles with a first round stoppage of Jason Cunningham on 29 July 2023, picking up his opponent's WBO International championship in the process.

Davies defended his European championship against Vincenzo La Femina at Manchester Arena on 18 November 2023. Both boxers were floored in the third round, but Davies recovered the better to secure the victory via stoppage in the fifth round.

He faced Erik Robles Ayala for the vacant IBO super-bantamweight title at Resorts World Birmingham in Birmingham on 16 March 2024, winning by technical knockout in the second round.

At the same venue on 2 November 2024, Davies lost his title and unbeaten record to Shabaz Masoud via split decision with one judge favouring him 115-113 and the other two scoring the fight 115-113 and 116-112 respectively for his opponent.

Once more moving up in weight categories, Davies faced undefeated Kurt Walker for the vacant IBF Inter-Continental featherweight title at Nottingham Arena on 10 May 2025, winning by unanimous decision.

He fought Francesco Grandelli for the vacant European featherweight title at Co-op Live in Manchester on 28 March 2026. Davies won when Grandelli retired at the end of round six.

Davies made a successful first defense of his European title against Nathaniel Collins at bp pulse LIVE in Birmingham on 26 September 2026. He knocked his opponent to the canvas in the first round and eventually won when Collins was retired by his corner at the end of the seventh round.

== Professional boxing record ==
20 fights	19 wins	1 loss
By knockout	10	0
By decision	9	1

No.	Result	Record	Opponent	Type	Round, Time	Date	Location	Notes
20	Win	19–1	Nathaniel Collins	RTD	7 (12), 3:00	26 Sep 2026	bp pulse LIVE, Birmingham, England	Retained WBO Inter-Continental and European featherweight titles
19	Win	18–1	Francesco Grandelli	RTD	6 (12), 3:00	28 Mar 2026	Co-op Live, Manchester, England	Won WBO Inter-Continental and vacant European featherweight titles
18	Win	17–1	Kurt Walker	UD	12	10 May 2025	Nottingham Arena, Nottingham, England	Won vacant IBF Inter-Continental featherweight title
17	Loss	16–1	Shabaz Masoud	SD	12	2 Nov 2024	Resorts World Birmingham, Birmingham, England	Lost IBO super-bantamweight title
16	Win	16–0	Erik Robles Ayala	TKO	2 (12), 1:17	16 Mar 2024	Resorts World Birmingham, Birmingham, England	Won vacant IBO super-bantamweight title
15	Win	15–0	Vincenzo La Femina	TKO	5 (12), 2:50	19 Nov 2023	Manchester Arena, Manchester, England	Retained European super bantamweight title
14	Win	14–0	Jason Cunningham	TKO	1 (12), 2:46	29 Jul 2023	Telford International Centre, Telford, England	Retained British, WBC International and European super-bantamweight titles; Won WBO International super-bantamweight title
13	Win	13–0	Ionuț Baluta	UD	12	19 Nov 2022	Telford International Centre, Telford, England	Won WBC International and vacant European super-bantamweight titles
12	Win	12–0	Marc Leach	UD	12	11 Jun 2022	Telford International Centre, Telford, England	Won British super-bantamweight title
11	Win	11–0	Dixon Flores	UD	10	9 Oct 2021	Ultilita Arena, Birmingham, England	Won vacant WBC International Silver super-bantamweight title
10	Win	10–0	Raymond Commey	TKO	2 (8), 2:52	28 Aug 2021	Arena Birmingham, Birmingham, England	
9	Win	9–0	Stefan Slavchev	TKO	2 (6), 1:01	5 Jun 2021	Telford International Centre, Telford, England	
8	Win	8–0	Sean Cairns	RTD	6 (10), 3:00	21 Nov 2020	Wembley Arena, London, England	Won vacant English bantamweight title
7	Win	7–0	Brett Fidoe	PTS	4	14 Feb 2020	Bescot Stadium, Walsall, England	
6	Win	6–0	Stefan Nicolae	PTS	6	7 Dec 2019	Bescot Stadium, Walsall, England	
5	Win	5–0	Jose Aguilar	KO	4 (6), 2:32	28 Sep 2019	Walsall Town Hall, Walsall, England	
4	Win	4–0	Edward Bjorklund	PTS	4	21 Jun 2019	King's Hall, Stoke-on-Trent, England	
3	Win	3–0	Pablo Narvaez	TKO	2 (4), 1:04	11 May 2019	Walsall Town Hall, Walsall, England	
2	Win	2–0	Stefan Slavchev	PTS	4	16 Feb 2019	Walsall Town Hall, Walsall, England	
1	Win	1–0	Khvicha Gigolashvili	PTS	4	9 Dec 2018	Holiday Inn Birmingham, Birmingham, England	
