= Nawaphon Kaikanha =

Thai boxer

Nawaphon Kaikanha นวพล ไขกัญหา
Personal information
- Nicknames: Nawaphon Por Chokchai; Nawaphon Sor Rungvisai; Nawaphon Nakornloung
- Nationality: Thai
- Born: Nawaphon Kaikanha; 2 September 1991 (age 34) Sikhio District, Nakhon Ratchasima Province, Thailand
- Height: 5 ft 5 1/2 in (166 cm)
- Weight: Flyweight; Super-flyweight; Bantamweight

Boxing career
- Stance: Orthodox

Boxing record
- Total fights: 64
- Wins: 62
- Win by KO: 50
- Losses: 5
- Draws: 1

Nawaphon Kaikanha (Thai: นวพล ไขกัญหา; born 2 September 1991), also known as Nawaphon Nakornloung and Nawaphon Sor Rungvisai (นวพล นครหลวงโปรโมชั่น, นวพล ศ.รุ่งวิสัย), formerly Nawaphon Por Chokchai (นวพล ป.โชคชัย), is a Thai professional boxer who challenged for the WBC flyweight title in 2017.

== Early life and Boxing career ==
Nawaphon was born into a family of boxers. His elder brother, Suriyan Sor Rungvisai, was the WBC super flyweight world champion from 2011 to 2012. Nawaphon began his boxing career in Muay Thai, supported by his father, while he was in his second year of school.

He made his professional boxing debut in late 2010 at Sisaket Rajabhat University, Sisaket Province, where he defeated fellow Thai boxer Palangpol Chaiyonggym. In 2011, he won the ABCO (WBC Asia) flyweight title, achieving an early career record of 36 wins.

On March 4, 2017, Nawaphon challenged Mexican contender Juan "Churritos" Hernández for the vacant WBC flyweight title at Nimibutr Stadium, part of the National Stadium complex in Bangkok. He entered the bout as the WBC's #1 ranked contender in the division.

This match was notable for being the first professional boxing event in Thailand in nearly 30 years to be held under world-class conditions. Unlike the typical local events—often conducted outdoors on temporary rings in the afternoon with free admission and sponsorship from companies or politicians—this fight featured ticket sales, was hosted in an indoor air-conditioned arena, and took place during Saturday night prime time. The event was co-promoted by BEC-TERO Entertainment and Nakornloung Promotion. Despite the fanfare, Nawaphon was defeated by TKO in the third round when the referee stopped the fight.

On April 21, 2018, He returned to the ring and secured a TKO victory in the fifth round over fellow Thai boxer Amnat Ruenroeng, a former IBF flyweight world champion. The fight was held at Workpoint Studio in Pathum Thani Province.

== Professional boxing record ==
68 fights	62 wins	5 losses
By knockout	50	4
By decision	12	1
Draws	1	

No.	Result	Record	Opponent	Type	Round, time	Date	Location	Notes
65	Win	60–4–1	Phuyaisree Or.Pramuansak	TKO	2 (6)	26 Apr 2023	Max Muaythai Stadium, Pattaya, Thailand	
64	Win	59–4–1	Wichai Khamson	TKO	2 (6)	29 Mar 2023	Max Muaythai Stadium, Pattaya, Thailand	
63	Loss	58–4–1	Daigo Higa	KO	4 (10), 2:29	31 Dec 2023	Ota City General Gymnasium, Ōta, Tokyo, Japan	
62	Loss	58–3–1	Vincent Astrolabio	TKO	11 (12)	26 Aug 2023	Suan Lum Night Bazaar Ratchadaphisek, Bangkok, Thailand	
61	Win	58–2–1	Yuri Kokietgym	KO	3 (8), 1:27	25 Feb 2023	Thupatemi Stadium, Pathum Thani, Thailand	
60	Win	57–2–1	Brandon Alejandro	TKO	2 (6), 1:35	24 Dec 2022	Thupatemi Stadium, Pathum Thani, Thailand	
59	Loss	56–2–1	Jason Moloney	UD	12	16 Oct 2022	Rod Laver Arena, Melbourne, Australia	
58	Win	56–1–1	Kompayak Porpramook	TKO	5 (8), 1:26	27 Aug 2022	Suan Lum Night Bazaar Ratchadaphisek, Bangkok, Thailand	
57	Win	55–1–1	Pipat Chaiporn	TKO	5 (8), 1:48	30 Jul 2022	Suan Lum Night Bazaar Ratchadaphisek, Bangkok, Thailand	
56	Win	54–1–1	Rattakorn Tassaworn	TKO	3 (6)	28 May 2022	Suan Lum Night Bazaar Ratchadaphisek, Bangkok, Thailand	
55	Win	53–1–1	Thitikorn Rattanakun	TKO	2 (6), 1:22	30 Apr 2022	Suan Lum Night Bazaar Ratchadaphisek, Bangkok, Thailand	
54	Win	52–1–1	Prathip Chinram	KO	4 (6), 1:24	26 Mar 2022	Suan Lum Night Bazaar Ratchadaphisek, Bangkok, Thailand	
53	Win	51–1–1	Sophon Klachun	TKO	7 (8)	3 Apr 2021	Workpoint Studio, Bang Phun, Thailand	
52	Win	50–1–1	Yutthichai Wannawong	TKO	4 (6)	7 Nov 2020	Workpoint Studio, Bang Phun, Thailand	
51	Win	49–1–1	Suradech Ruhasiri	KO	4 (10)	25 Jul 2020	Workpoint Studio, Bang Phun, Thailand	Retained WBC-ABC bantamweight title
50	Win	48–1–1	Minthada Litthiwong	KO	2 (6)	21 Dec 2019	Workpoint Studio, Bang Phun, Thailand	
49	Win	47–1–1	Patrick Liukhoto	RTD	6 (10), 3:00	21 Sep 2019	Workpoint Studio, Bang Phun, Thailand	Retained WBC-ABC bantamweight title
48	Win	46–1–1	Ryan Lumacad	KO	3 (6), 3:00	20 Jul 2019	Workpoint Studio, Bang Phun, Thailand	
47	Win	45–1–1	Sonny Boy Jaro	KO	7 (12), 1:30	18 May 2019	Workpoint Studio, Bang Phun, Thailand	Retained WBC-ABC bantamweight title
46	Win	44–1–1	Worawatchai Boonjan	UD	6	28 Dec 2018	Ram 100 Thai Boxing Stadium, Bangkok, Thailand	
45	Win	43–1–1	Richard Claveras	TKO	4 (12), 1:42	17 Nov 2018	Workpoint Studio, Bang Phun, Thailand	Retained WBC-ABC bantamweight title
44	Win	42–1–1	Likit Chane	UD	12	21 Jul 2018	Workpoint Studio, Bang Phun, Thailand	Won vacant WBC-ABC bantamweight title
43	Win	41–1–1	Amnat Ruenroeng	TKO	5 (12)	21 Apr 2018	Workpoint Studio, Bang Phun, Thailand	Retained WBC-ABC Continental super flyweight title
42	Win	40–1–1	Akkarachat Konsue	TKO	6 (6), 1:15	19 Jan 2018	Pathum Thani, Thailand	
41	Win	39–1–1	Wachira Jommaroeng	KO	5 (6)	10 Nov 2017	Central Plaza, Bangkok, Thailand	
40	Win	38–1–1	Satheerat Upool	TKO	3 (6)	4 Aug 2017	Samut Prakan, Thailand	
39	Win	37–1–1	Frans Damur Palue	KO	7 (12)	7 Jul 2017	Pathum Thani, Thailand	Won vacant WBC-ABC Continental super flyweight title
38	Loss	36–1–1	Juan Hernandez Navarrete	TKO	3 (12), 2:29	4 Mar 2017	National Stadium Gymnasium, Bangkok, Thailand	For vacant WBC flyweight title
37	Win	36–0–1	Petnakorn Laos PDR	UD	6	23 Sep 2016	Lad Sawai Market, Pathum Thani, Thailand	
36	Win	35–0–1	Roque Lauro	TKO	6 (12)	22 Jul 2016	Lad Sawai Market, Pathum Thani, Thailand	Retained WBC-ABC flyweight title
35	Win	34–0–1	Macrea Gandionco	KO	3 (12), 1:44	19 May 2016	Watnernsai School, Rayong, Thailand	Retained WBC-ABC flyweight title
34	Win	33–0–1	Geboi Mansalayao	KO	4 (12), 0:40	18 Mar 2016	Chaleena Hotel, Bangkok, Thailand	Retained WBC-ABC flyweight title
33	Win	32–0–1	Heri Amol	KO	6 (12), 2:24	22 Jan 2016	Potharam Riverside, Ratchaburi, Thailand	Retained WBC-ABC flyweight title
32	Win	31–0–1	Paulus Baransano	KO	4 (12)	20 Nov 2015	Klong 6, Khlong Luang, Thailand	Retained WBC-ABC flyweight title
31	Win	30–0–1	Medgoen Por Kobkua	TKO	5 (6), 2:13	18 Sep 2015	Lad Sawai Market, Pathum Thani, Thailand	
30	Win	29–0–1	Wiljan Ugbaniel	KO	2 (12)	17 Jul 2015	Iyara Market, Pathum Thani, Thailand	Retained WBC-ABC flyweight title
29	Win	28–0–1	Somkiat Hemwijit	KO	5 (6)	28 May 2015	Liptapanlop Hall, Nakhon Ratchasima, Thailand	
28	Win	27–0–1	Dion Arema	KO	5 (12)	28 Apr 2015	Prasamut Jedi, Samut Prakan, Thailand	Retained WBC-ABC flyweight title
27	Win	26–0–1	Powell Balaba	KO	5 (12), 0:50	24 Feb 2015	Klong 6, Khlong Luang, Thailand	Retained WBC-ABC flyweight title
26	Win	25–0–1	Mateo Handig	KO	5 (12)	21 Nov 2014	Municipality of Nongsaeng, Sara Buri, Thailand	Retained WBC-ABC flyweight title
25	Win	24–0–1	Donny Mabao	TKO	4 (12)	10 Oct 2014	Potharam Riverside, Ratchaburi, Thailand	Retained WBC-ABC flyweight title
24	Win	23–0–1	Hendrik Barongsay	PTS	6	19 Sep 2014	Praputachai School, Sara Buri, Thailand	
23	Win	22–0–1	Jayar Estremos	TKO	7 (12)	18 Jul 2014	Lad Sawai Market, Pathum Thani, Thailand	Retained WBC-ABC flyweight title
22	Win	21–0–1	Michael Landero	KO	3 (12)	8 Apr 2014	Lamsamkaew Youth Center, Pathum Thani, Thailand	Retained WBC-ABC flyweight title
21	Win	20–0–1	Shusong Zhuang	TKO	4 (12), 1:48	18 Feb 2014	NCO Club, Bangkok, Thailand	Retained WBC-ABC flyweight title
20	Win	19–0–1	Rodel Tejares	PTS	6	21 Jan 2014	Wat Klang Klong 3 School, Pathum Thani, Thailand	
19	Win	18–0–1	Crison Omayao	KO	2 (6)	15 Nov 2013	Provincial Stadium, Nakhon Ratchasima, Thailand	
18	Win	17–0–1	Wilber Andogan	KO	3 (12), 2:05	8 Oct 2013	Samakkeeradbamrung School, Pathum Thani, Thailand	Retained WBC-ABC flyweight title
17	Win	16–0–1	Roque Lauro	UD	12	19 Jul 2013	King Ramesuan Provincial Stadium, Lop Buri, Thailand	Retained WBC-ABC flyweight title
16	Win	15–0–1	Julius Alcos	PTS	6	25 Jun 2013	The Mall, Nakhon Ratchasima, Thailand	
15	Win	14–0–1	Rodel Tejares	KO	2 (10), 1:13	3 May 2013	Khonmuangsri Stadium, Si Sa Ket, Thailand	
14	Win	13–0–1	Joan Imperial	KO	4 (12), 2:05	18 Mar 2013	NCO Club, Bangkok, Thailand	Retained WBC-ABC flyweight title
13	Win	12–0–1	Ronerex Dalut	TKO	8 (12), 1:38	28 Jan 2013	Bangplama School, Suphan Buri, Thailand	Retained WBC-ABC flyweight title
12	Win	11–0–1	Manot Comput	UD	6	3 Dec 2012	North Bangkok University, Bangkok, Thailand	
11	Win	10–0–1	Noel Adelmita	KO	5 (12), 2:46	16 Oct 2012	Lad Sawai Market, Pathum Thani, Thailand	Retained WBC-ABC flyweight title
10	Win	9–0–1	Chumpon Phrombanphot	TKO	5 (6)	2 Jul 2012	Minburi Market, Minburi, Thailand	
9	Win	8–0–1	Kamon Singram	TKO	3 (6)	8 May 2012	Nakhon Pathom, Thailand	
8	Win	7–0–1	Rey Megrino	MD	12	17 Jan 2012	Thesabarn Muang Ladluwong, Phra Pradaeng, Thailand	Retained WBC-ABC flyweight title
7	Win	6–0–1	Alwi Alhabsyi	TKO	3 (12), 1:48	11 Oct 2011	The Pirates Restaurant, Klong 2, Pathum Thani, Thailand	Won vacant WBC-ABC flyweight title
6	Win	5–0–1	Tawachchai Por Kobkua	KO	1 (6)	19 Aug 2011	Khonmuangsri Stadium, Si Sa Ket, Thailand	
5	Win	4–0–1	Yodmongkol Sor Samart	KO	2 (6)	14 Jun 2011	Bang Phun, Thailand	
4	Win	3–0–1	Manot Comput	KO	2 (6)	12 Apr 2011	Mai Khao Beach, Phuket, Thailand	
3	Win	2–0–1	Kamon Singram	TKO	3 (6)	3 Mar 2011	Phra Samut Chedi, Thailand	
2	Win	1–0–1	Palangpol Chaiyonggym	PTS	6	24 Dec 2010	Rajabhat Srisaket University, Si Sa Ket, Thailand	
1	Draw	0–0–1	Srisaket Sor Rungvisai	PTS	6	14 Aug 2009	Ban Phai, Khon Kaen, Thailand	
