= Kash Farooq =

Scottish boxer (born 1996)

Personal information
- Nickname: Untouchable
- Nationality: Pakistani; Scottish
- Born: Ukashir Farooq; 3 January 1996 (age 30) Gujranwala, Pakistan
- Height: 5 ft 5 in (165 cm)
- Weight: Bantamweight

Boxing career
- Stance: Orthodox

Boxing record
- Total fights: 17
- Wins: 16
- Win by KO: 6
- Losses: 1

Ukashir Farooq (born 3 January 1996) is a Pakistani-Scottish former professional boxer who competed from 2015 to 2021. He held the British bantamweight title from 2018 to 2019 and challenged once for the Commonwealth bantamweight title in 2019.

== Early life ==
Ukashir Farooq, known by friends and family as "Kash", was born on 3 January 1996 in Gujranwala, Punjab, Pakistan. One of three brothers, he and his family immigrated to England and applied for asylum in 2002, initially living in London before being relocated to Glasgow, Scotland. He first entered a boxing gym in 2010 after being invited by a friend. In an interview with The Herald, Farooq recalled: "I wasn’t interested in boxing at the start" and "...the trainer saw me hitting a few bags and asked me to come back. I came back and did some sparring and it just continued from there. Now I love boxing."

== Professional career ==
Farooq made his professional debut on 25 October 2015, winning a four round points decision over Craig Derbyshire at the Radisson Blu Hotel in Glasgow.

After winning his first seven fights, he challenged Scott Allan for the Scottish Area bantamweight title on 23 November 2017 at the Radisson Blu Hotel. Farooq won via eighth-round technical knockout (TKO).

On 27 September 2018, he faced Jamie Wilson at the St. Andrew’s Sporting Club in Glasgow. Farooq scored a TKO victory 73 seconds into the first round to capture the vacant British bantamweight title, becoming the first Scottish boxer in 21 years to do so.

The first defence of his British title came on 30 November 2018, against Iain Butcher at the Emirates Arena, Glasgow. Farooq retained his title with a unanimous decision over twelve rounds.

He defended his title for the second time on 25 April 2019, against undefeated Kyle Williams at the Radisson Blu Hotel, winning via fifth-round TKO.

On 17 August 2019, Farooq beat Duane Winters by first-round knockout (KO) at the Radisson Blu Hotel to retained his British bantamweight title.

On 16 November 2019, he challenged Commonwealth bantamweight champion Lee McGregor at the Emirates Arena, Glasgow. Farooq lost a highly disputed and controversial split decision in which many felt Farooq should have been the clear victor.

In January 2022, in a statement released via St. Andrew's Sporting Club, Farooq announced his retirement from boxing at the age of 26. Citing "unforeseen circumstances", the statement thanked the British Boxing Board of Control, saying it's procedures kept the "health and safety of the boxers paramount at all times". It was also revealed that Farooq will be taking the role of "Head of Talent" for the St. Andrew's Sporting Club.

== Professional boxing record ==
17 fights	16 wins	1 loss
By knockout	6	0
By decision	10	1

No.	Result	Record	Opponent	Type	Round, time	Date	Location	Notes
17	Win	16–1	Luis Gerardo Castillo	UD	10	14 Aug 2021	Matchroom Headquarters, Brentwood, England	Won vacant WBC International bantamweight title
16	Win	15–1	Alexander Espinoza	UD	10	10 Apr 2021	Copper Box Arena, London, England	Won WBC International Silver bantamweight title
15	Win	14–1	Ángel Aviles	UD	10	14 Nov 2020	The SSE Arena, London, England	Won vacant WBA Continental (Europe) bantamweight title
14	Loss	13–1	Lee McGregor	SD	12	16 Nov 2019	Emirates Arena, Glasgow, Scotland	Lost British bantamweight title; For Commonwealth bantamweight title
13	Win	13–0	Duane Winters	KO	1 (12), 2:58	17 Aug 2019	Radisson Blu Hotel, Glasgow, Scotland	Retained British bantamweight title
12	Win	12–0	Kyle Williams	TKO	5 (12), 2:05	25 Apr 2019	Radisson Blu Hotel, Glasgow, Scotland	Retained British bantamweight title
11	Win	11–0	Iain Butcher	UD	12	30 Nov 2018	Emirates Arena, Glasgow, Scotland	Retained British bantamweight title
10	Win	10–0	Jamie Wilson	TKO	1 (12), 1:12	27 Sep 2018	St. Andrew’s Sporting Club, Glasgow, Scotland	Won vacant British bantamweight title
9	Win	9–0	Jose Hernandez	TKO	2 (6)	16 Jun 2018	Lagoon Leisure Centre, Paisley, Scotland	
8	Win	8–0	Scott Allan	TKO	8 (10), 2:31	23 Nov 2017	Radisson Blu Hotel, Glasgow, Scotland	Won Scottish Area bantamweight title
7	Win	7–0	Georgi Andonov	TKO	1 (6)	21 Sep 2017	Radisson Blu Hotel, Glasgow, Scotland	
6	Win	6–0	Michael Barnor	PTS	6	3 Jun 2017	Lagoon Leisure Centre, Paisley, Scotland	
5	Win	5–0	Dimitrijs Gutmans	PTS	6	20 Apr 2017	Radisson Blu Hotel, Glasgow, Scotland	
4	Win	4–0	Scott Allan	PTS	10	19 Jan 2017	Radisson Blu Hotel, Glasgow, Scotland	
3	Win	3–0	Brett Fidoe	PTS	6	26 May 2016	Radisson Blu Hotel, Glasgow, Scotland	
2	Win	2–0	Anwar Alfadli	PTS	4	21 Jan 2016	Radisson Blu Hotel, Glasgow, Scotland	
1	Win	1–0	Craig Derbyshire	PTS	4	25 Oct 2015	Radisson Blu Hotel, Glasgow, Scotland	

== See also ==
- Asian-Scots
