= Werner Kirsch =

German boxer (1938–2017)

Personal information
- Nationality: German
- Born: 16 April 1938; Werdau, Germany
- Died: 29 July 2017 (aged 79); Berlin, Germany

Sport
- Sport: Boxing

Werner Kirsch (16 April 1938 – 29 July 2017) was a German boxer. He competed in the men's featherweight event at the 1960 Summer Olympics.
