= André Iuncker =

French boxer (1933–2020)

Personal information
- Nationality: French
- Born: 29 July 1933; Dombasle-sur-Meurthe, France
- Died: 23 April 2020 (aged 86); Sausheim, France

Sport
- Sport: Boxing

André Iuncker (29 July 1933 – 23 April 2020) was a French boxer. He competed in the men's featherweight event at the 1960 Summer Olympics.
