= Abe Bekker =

Zambian boxer (1935–2025)

Personal information
- Born: 10 June 1935 Mufulira, Northern Rhodesia
- Died: 9 January 2025 (aged 89) England
Medal record
Men's Boxing
Representing Northern Rhodesia
British Empire and Commonwealth Games
| Silver medal – second place | 1954 Vancouver | Flyweight |

Abe Bekker (10 June 1935 – 9 January 2025) was a Zambian boxer who competed in the flyweight class at the 1954 British Empire and Commonwealth Games in Vancouver and in the bantamweight class at the 1958 British Empire and Commonwealth Games in Cardiff representing Northern Rhodesia. He also represented Rhodesia at the 1960 Summer Olympics in the featherweight division, where he was eliminated in the quarterfinals by Jorma Limmonen of Finland.

Bekker died on 9 January 2025 in England, at the age of 89.
