= Gaby Mancini =

Canadian boxer (born 1940)

Personal information
- Full name: Gabriele Mancini
- Nationality: Canadian
- Born: 24 April 1940 (age 86) Pito, Ascoli Piceno, Italy

Sport
- Sport: Boxing

Gabriele "Gaby" Mancini (born 24 April 1940) is a Canadian former boxer of Italian descent. He competed in the men's featherweight event at the 1960 Summer Olympics.

== 1960 Olympic results ==
Below is the record of Gaby Mancini, a Canadian featherweight boxer who competed at the 1960 Rome Olympics:

- Round of 32: lost to Shinetsu Suzuki (Japan) by decision, 0-5
