= Carlos Aro =

Argentine boxer

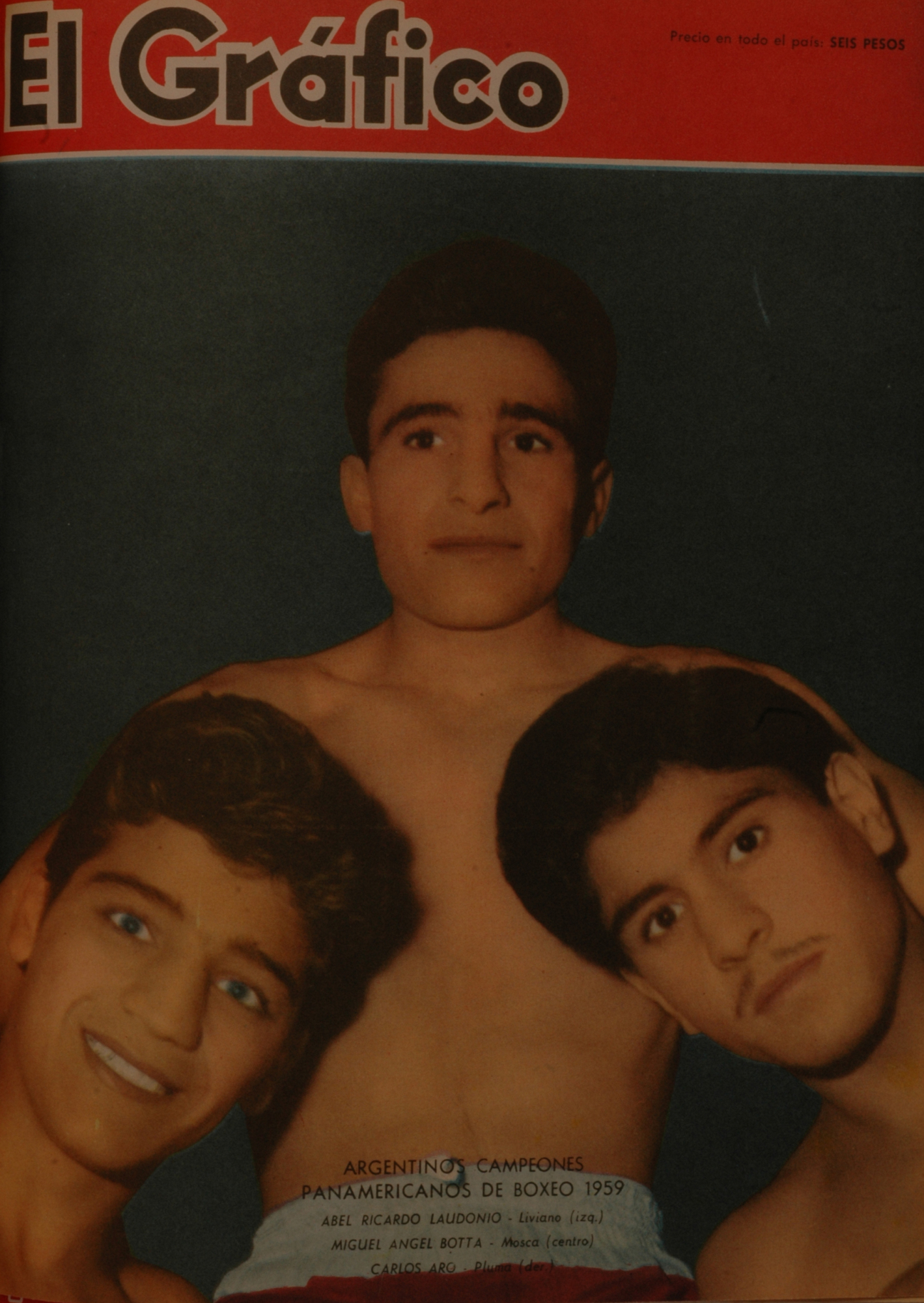
- Abel Ricardo Laudonio, Miguel Ángel Botta and Carlos Aro - El Gráfico 1959.

Personal information
- Born: 22 September 1939 Mendoza, Argentina
- Died: 16 July 2017 (aged 77)

Sport
- Sport: Boxing
Medal record
Men's amateur boxing
Representing Argentina
Pan American Games
Gold medal – first place	1959 Chicago	Featherweight

Carlos Aro (22 September 1939 – 16 July 2017) was an Argentine boxer. He competed in the men's featherweight event at the 1960 Summer Olympics. He was also first in the 1959 Pan American Games featherweight class.
