= Constantin Gheorghiu =

Romanian boxer

Personal information
- Nationality: Romanian
- Born: 1 June 1933 (age 91); Bucharest, Romania

Sport
- Sport: Boxing

Constantin Gheorghiu (born 1 June 1933) is a Romanian boxer. He competed in the men's featherweight event at the 1960 Summer Olympics.
