= Ryosuke Nishida =

Japanese boxer (born 1996)

Ryosuke Nishida 西田凌佑
Personal information
- Born: 7 August 1996 (age 30) Kashiba, Nara, Japan
- Height: 5 ft 7 in (170 cm)
- Weight: Bantamweight

Boxing career
- Reach: 68 in (173 cm)
- Stance: Southpaw

Boxing record
- Total fights: 13
- Wins: 11
- Win by KO: 2
- Losses: 2

Ryosuke Nishida (Japanese: 西田凌佑, Nishida Ryosuke; born 7 August 1996) is a Japanese professional boxer, who held the International Boxing Federation (IBF) bantamweight title from 2024 to 2025.

== Professional boxing career ==
Nishida began boxing while attending the Nara Prefectural Oji Technical High School, during which time he won the national high school boxing tournament. Nishida continued training boxing at the Rokushima Boxing Gym while attending the Kindai University, but stopped training after graduating to work in the food industry. He once again took up boxing early in 2019. Nishida made his professional boxing debut against Sakol Ketkul on 3 October 2019. He won the fight by a first-round technical knockout.

Nishida faced the journeyman Pablito Canada in his second professional six-round bout on 22 December 2019. He won the fight by unanimous decision, with all three judges scoring the fight 60–52 in his favor. Nishida faced the former Japanese bantamweight champion Shohei Omori in his first eight-round bout on 19 December 2020. He won the fight by unanimous decision, with scores of 79–73, 78–74 and 78–74.

After winning his first three professional fights, Nishida was booked to challenge the former WBC flyweight and reigning WBO Asia Pacific bantamweight champion Daigo Higa on 24 April 2021. Nishida captured his first professional title by unanimous decision, with two scorecards of 117–111 and one scorecard of 118–110.

Nishida made his first WBO Asia Pacific bantamweight title defense against Tetsuro Ohashi on 19 December 2021, in the main event of a "Muto Promotions" card which took place at the Sumiyoshi Ward Center in Osaka, Japan. He won the fight by unanimous decision, with scores of 118–110, 119–109 and 116–112.

Nishida made his second WBO Asia Pacific title defense against the #15 ranked OPBF bantamweight contender Aljum Pelesio. The title bout headlined the "You Will Be the Champion 14" event, which took place at the Sumiyoshi Ward Center in Osaka, Japan on 9 October 2022. He won the fight by unanimous decision, with all three judges awarding him all ten rounds of the bout.

Nishida made his third WBO Asia Pacific title defense against Songsaeng Phoyaem, in the main event of "3150 FIGHT SURVIVAL", which took place on 1 April 2023 at the EDION Arena Osaka in Osaka, Japan. He won the fight by unanimous decision, with all three judges scoring the bout 120–107 in his favor.

Nishida faced Christian Medina Jimenez in an IBF bantamweight title eliminator on 11 August 2023. He won the fight by unanimous decision, with scores of 118–110, 117–111 and 116–112.

In a very close fight Nishida defeated Emmanuel Rodríguez by unanimous decision in Osaka, Japan, on 4 May 2024 to become the IBF bantamweight world champion.

On 15 December 2024, Nishida made the first defense of his IBF bantamweight title against the IBF's 14th ranked contender, Anuchai Donsua. He defeated Donsua by body shot TKO in the 7th round.

It was reported on 7 March 2025, that Nishida would make the second defense of his IBF bantamweight title against his mandatory challenger, Jose Salas Reyes on 28 May in Tokyo, Japan. On 18 April 2025, it was announced that Nishida would instead be facing WBC bantamweight champion Junto Nakatani in a WBC and IBF bantamweight title unification match. Nishida lost the fight, which took place at the Ariake Arena in Tokyo on 8 June 2025, when he retired at the end of the sixth round due to an eye injury.

On 27 September 2026, Nishida faced Sam Goodman for the interim IBF super bantamweight title. He lost the fight by unanimous decision.

== Professional boxing record ==
13 fights	11 wins	2 losses
By knockout	2	1
By decision	9	1

No.	Result	Record	Opponent	Type	Round, time	Date	Location	Notes
13	Loss	11–2	Sam Goodman	UD	12	27 Sep 2026	Toyota Arena, Tokyo, Japan	For Interim IBF super bantamweight title
12	Win	11–1	Bryan Mercado	TD	7 (12), 2:53	15 Feb 2026	Sumiyoshi Sports Center, Osaka, Japan	
11	Loss	10–1	Junto Nakatani	RTD	6 (12), 3:00	8 Jun 2025	Ariake Arena, Tokyo, Japan	Lost IBF bantamweight title; For WBC and vacant The Ring bantamweight titles
10	Win	10–0	Anuchai Donsua	KO	7 (12), 1:37	15 Dec 2024	Sumiyoshi Sports Center, Osaka, Japan	Retained IBF bantamweight title
9	Win	9–0	Emmanuel Rodríguez	UD	12	4 May 2024	EDION Arena Osaka, Osaka, Japan	Won IBF bantamweight title
8	Win	8–0	Christian Medina	UD	12	11 Aug 2023	EDION Arena Osaka, Osaka, Japan	
7	Win	7–0	Songsaeng Phoyaem	UD	12	1 Apr 2023	EDION Arena Osaka, Osaka, Japan	Retained WBO Asia Pacific bantamweight title
6	Win	6–0	Aljum Pelesio	UD	10	9 Oct 2022	Sumiyoshi Ward Center, Osaka, Japan	Retained WBO Asia Pacific bantamweight title
5	Win	5–0	Tetsuro Ohashi	UD	12	19 Dec 2021	Sumiyoshi Ward Center, Osaka, Japan	Retained WBO Asia Pacific bantamweight title
4	Win	4–0	Daigo Higa	UD	12	24 Apr 2021	Convention Center, Ginowan, Japan	Won WBO Asia Pacific bantamweight title
3	Win	3–0	Shohei Omori	UD	8	19 Dec 2020	EDION Arena Osaka, Osaka, Japan	
2	Win	2–0	Pablito Canada	UD	6	22 Dec 2019	Sumiyoshi Ward Center, Osaka, Japan	
1	Win	1–0	Sakol Ketkul	TKO	1 (6), 2:00	3 Oct 2019	M.U. Den Boxing Group, Bangkok, Thailand	

== See also ==
- List of southpaw stance boxers
- Boxing in Japan
- List of Japanese boxing world champions
- List of world bantamweight boxing champions

Sporting positions
Regional boxing titles
Preceded by Daigo Higa	WBO Asia Pacific bantamweight champion 24 April 2021 – 4 May 20245; Won world title	Vacant
World boxing titles
Preceded by Emmanuel Rodríguez	IBF bantamweight champion 4 May 2024 – 8 June 2025	Succeeded by Junto Nakatani
