= Jerzy Adamski =

Polish boxer

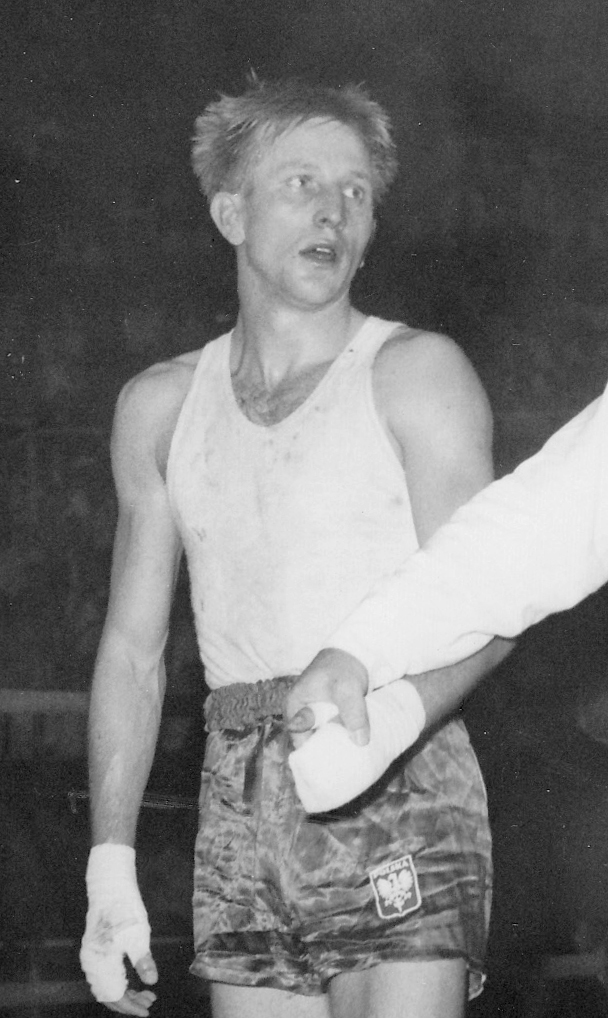
- Jerzy Adamski at the 1960 Olympics

Personal information
- Born: 14 March 1937 Sierpc, Poland
- Died: 6 December 2002 (aged 65) Bydgoszcz, Poland
- Height: 1.71 m (5 ft 7 in)
- Weight: 58 kg (128 lb)

Sport
- Sport: Boxing
- Club: Astoria Bydgoszcz
Medal record
Representing Poland
Olympic Games
| Silver medal – second place | 1960 Rome | Featherweight |
European Amateur Championships
| Gold medal – first place | 1959 Luzern | Featherweight |
| Bronze medal – third place | 1963 Moscow | Featherweight |

Jerzy Adamski (14 March 1937 – 6 December 2002) was a Polish featherweight boxer who won a silver medal at the 1960 Olympics and a European title in 1959. He won six national titles and had an amateur record of 237 wins, 10 losses and 23 draws. Adamski was awarded the Order of Polonia Restituta.

Adamski was born in a family of a railway worker, and had brothers Ryszard and Jan and a sister Lucyna. He graduated from a technical school with a degree in Mechanical and Electrical Engineering.
