= William Meyers =

South African boxer

Medal record

Men's Boxing

Representing South Africa

Olympic Games
Bronze medal – third place	1960 Rome	Featherweight

William Meyers (23 July 1943 – 7 May 2014) was a South African boxer who won a bronze medal at the 1960 Summer Olympics in Rome fighting as a featherweight.

Meyers, who was only 17 during the Rome Olympics, was the youngest South African boxer ever to win an Olympic medal. He never turned professional.

== 1960 Olympic results ==
Below is the record of William Meyers, a South African featherweight boxer who competed at the 1960 Rome Olympics:

- Round of 32: defeated Than Tun (Burma) by decision, 5-0
- Round of 16: defeated Hsu Teng-yun (Chinese Taipei) by a third-round knockout
- Quarterfinal: defeated Constantin Gheorghiu (Romania) by decision, 5-0
- Semifinal: lost to Jerzy Adamski (Poland) by decision, 1-4 (was awarded bronze medal)
