= Juan Díaz (Chilean boxer) =

Chilean boxer (1935–2020)

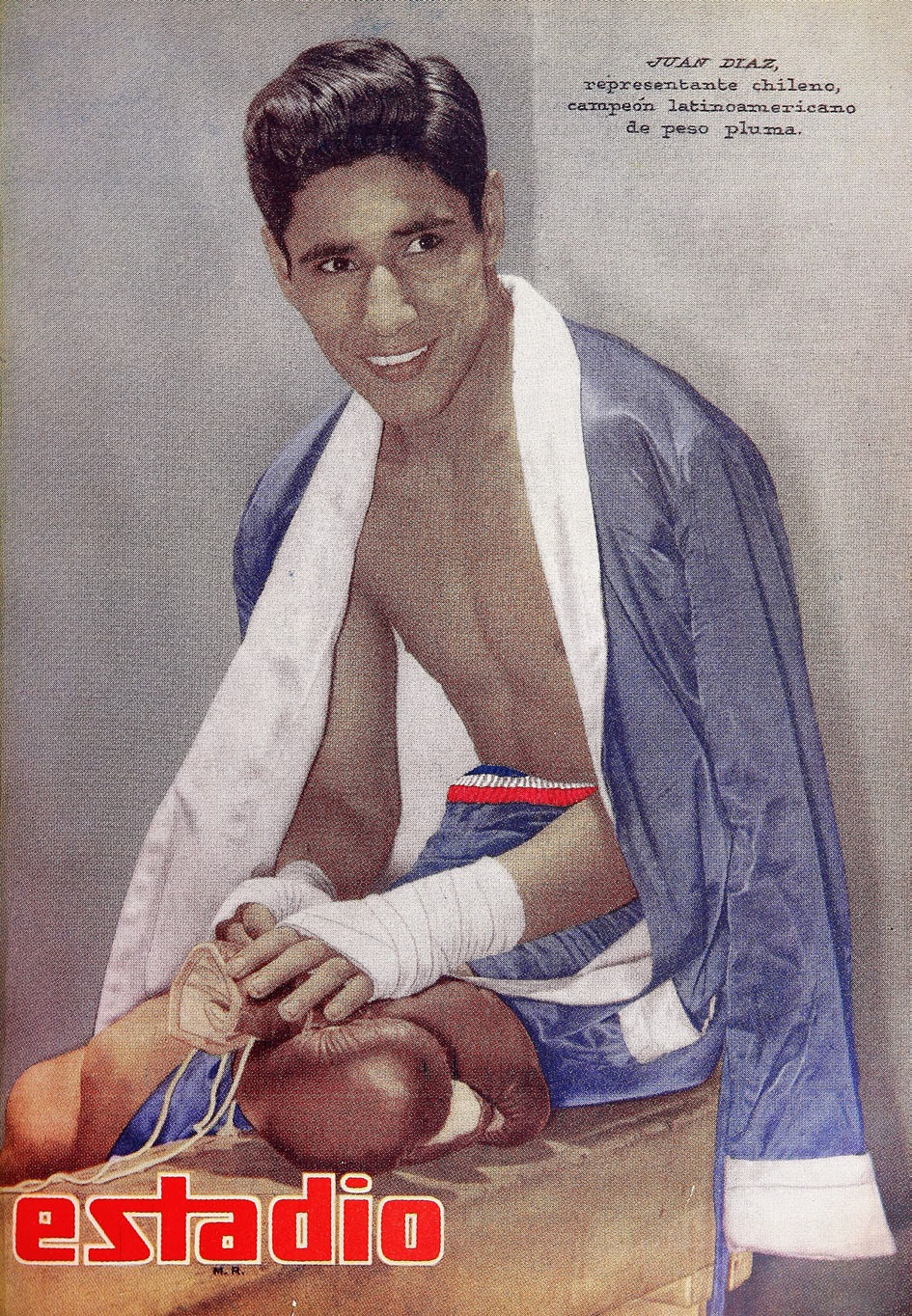

Personal information
- Born: 24 June 1935; Pozo Almonte, Chile
- Died: 15 June 2020 (aged 84)

Sport
- Sport: Boxing

Juan Díaz (24 June 1935 – 15 June 2020) was a Chilean boxer. He competed in the men's featherweight event at the 1960 Summer Olympics.
