= Francesco Grandelli =

Italian boxer (born 1994)

Personal information
- Born: 19 August 1994 (age 31) Turin, Italy
- Weight: Featherweight

Boxing career
- Stance: Southpaw

Boxing record
- Total fights: 22
- Wins: 17
- Win by KO: 4
- Losses: 2
- Draws: 2

Francesco Grandelli is an Italian professional boxer. He held the Italian featherweight title twice between 2018 and 2019 and international WBC Silver Champion in the year 2019 and European Silver champ in the year 2023.

He lives in Nichelino with his girlfriend Jasmine de Santis. Him and his father and brothers own a gym in Nichelino (Turin, Italy) with the purpose of giving an alternative chance to the young guys living poor in the area he's also grown up into.

He started boxing in Turin for Boxe Club Grasso in 2008, trained by the ex Olympic boxer Filippo Grasso.

== Professional career ==
Grandelli made his professional debut on 23 May 2015, scoring a four-round points decision (PTS) victory over Marco Iuculano at Pala Hilton Pharma in Ferrara, Italy. He secured two more PTS wins in 2015, against Lorenzo Cali in June and Antonio Sponziello in September, before suffering his first career defeat against Giuseppe Carafa in December via PTS over four rounds.

He began 2016 with a PTS win over Sponziello in a rematch followed by a draw against Dionisie Tiganas, just two weeks apart in May. In July, Grandelli defeated Tiganas in a rematch via third-round technical knockout (TKO) followed by a PTS win over Shoaib Zaman twenty days later. His final fight of 2016 was a PTS win against Carmelo Palermo in November.

After only fighting once in 2017—a TKO victory over Stefan Slavchev in July—Grandelli defeated Emiliano Salvini via unanimous decision (UD) over ten rounds to capture the vacant Italian featherweight title, with the judges scoring the bout 99–91, 99–92 and 98–93. The bout took place on 23 February 2018 at the Teatro Tenda in Grugliasco, Italy. He only fought once more in 2018, securing a UD win over Milan Delic in March.

Following a PTS win over Wallington Orobio in April 2019, Grandelli defeated Nicola Cipolletta by UD over ten rounds to capture the vacant Italian featherweight title for a second time. The bout took place on 5 July in Grugliasco, Italy. Two judges scored the bout 97–92 while the third scored it 98–91. His next fight came against Reece Bellotti for the vacant WBC International Silver featherweight title. The bout took place on 11 October at the PalaTrento in Trento, Italy. Grandelli defeated Bellotti via split decision (SD) to capture the WBC's regional title, with the judges' scorecards reading 96–94 and 96–95 in favour of Grandelli, and 96–95 to Bellotti.

== Professional boxing record ==
| 15 fights | 13 wins | 1 loss |
|---|---|---|
| By knockout | 2 | 0 |
| By decision | 11 | 1 |
| Draws | 1 | |

| No. | Result | Record | Opponent | Type | Round, time | Date | Location | Notes |
|---|---|---|---|---|---|---|---|---|
| 15 | Win | 13–1–1 | Reece Bellotti | SD | 10 | 11 Oct 2019 | PalaTrento, Trento, Italy | Won vacant WBC International Silver featherweight title |
| 14 | Win | 12–1–1 | Nicola Cipolletta | UD | 10 | 5 Jul 2019 | Grugliasco, Italy | Won vacant Italian featherweight title |
| 13 | Win | 11–1–1 | Wallington Orobio | PTS | 6 | 25 Apr 2019 | Palasport San Filippo, Brescia, Italy | |
| 12 | Win | 10–1–1 | Milan Delic | UD | 6 | 16 Mar 2018 | Centro Sportivo Comunale, Cernusco sul Naviglio, Italy | |
| 11 | Win | 9–1–1 | Emiliano Salvini | UD | 10 | 23 Feb 2018 | Teatro Tenda, Grugliasco, Italy | Won vacant Italian featherweight title |
| 10 | Win | 8–1–1 | Stefan Slavchev | TKO | 2 (6) | 7 Jul 2017 | Grugliasco, Italy | |
| 9 | Win | 7–1–1 | Carmelo Palermo | PTS | 6 | 27 Nov 2016 | Grugliasco, Italy | |
| 8 | Win | 6–1–1 | Shoaib Zaman | PTS | 4 | 23 Jul 2016 | Palasport, Valenza, Italy | |
| 7 | Win | 5–1–1 | Dionisie Tiganas | TKO | 3 (4) | 2 Jul 2016 | Rivarolo Canavese, Italy | |
| 6 | Draw | 4–1–1 | Dionisie Tiganas | PTS | 4 | 28 May 2016 | Porto Garibaldi, Italy | |
| 5 | Win | 4–1 | Antonio Sponziello | PTS | 4 | 13 May 2016 | PalaRuffini, Turin, Italy | |
| 4 | Loss | 3–1 | Giuseppe Carafa | PTS | 4 | 5 Dec 2015 | PalaOzan, Ugento, Italy | |
| 3 | Win | 3–0 | Antonio Sponziello | PTS | 4 | 26 Sep 2015 | Teatro Principe, Milan, Italy | |
| 2 | Win | 2–0 | Lorenzo Cali | PTS | 4 | 20 Jun 2015 | Teatro Principe, Milan, Italy | |
| 1 | Win | 1–0 | Marco Iuculano | PTS | 4 | 23 May 2015 | Pala Hilton Pharma, Ferrara, Italy | |
