= Francesco Musso =

Italian boxer (born 1937)

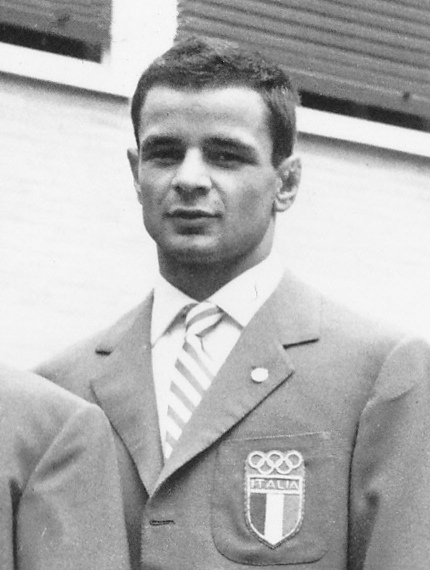
- Francesco Musso at the 1960 Olympics

Personal information
- Nickname: Franco
- Born: 22 August 1937 (age 88) Port St Louis, France
- Height: 1.68 m (5 ft 6 in)
- Weight: 57 kg (126 lb)

Sport
- Sport: Boxing
Medal record
Representing Italy
Olympic Games
Gold medal – first place	1960 Rome	Featherweight

Francesco Musso (born 22 August 1937) is a French-born Italian retired featherweight boxer, who won a gold medal at the 1960 Olympics in Rome. The same year he turned professional and retired in 1966, with a record of 24 wins and 4 losses. He never fought for a major title, and never fought outside of Europe.
