= Featherweight =

Weight class in combat sports

Featherweight is a weight class in the combat sports of boxing, kickboxing, mixed martial arts, and Greco-Roman wrestling.

== Boxing ==
=== Professional boxing ===
==== History ====
A featherweight boxer weighs in at a limit of 126 pounds (57 kg). In the early days of the division, this limit fluctuated. The British have generally always recognized the limit at 126 pounds, but in America the weight limit was at first 114 pounds. An early champion, George Dixon, moved the limit to 120 and then 122 pounds. Finally, in 1920 the United States fixed the limit at 126 pounds.

The 1860 fight between Nobby Clark and Jim Elliott is sometimes called the first featherweight championship. However, the division only gained wide acceptance in 1889 after the Ike Weir–Frank Murphy fight.

Since the end of the 2000s and early 2010s the featherweight division is one of the most active in boxing with fighters such as Orlando Salido, Chris John, Juan Manuel López, Celestino Caballero, Yuriorkis Gamboa, Elio Rojas, Israel Vazquez, Cristobal Cruz, Rafael Márquez, Rocky Juarez, Steven Luevano, Naseem Hamed, Marco Antonio Barrera and Manny Pacquiao.

==== Current world champions ====
Sanctioning Body	Reign Began	Champion	Record	Defenses
WBA	Vacant			
WBC	January 31, 2026	Bruce Carrington	18–0 (10 KO)	1
IBF	August 10, 2024	Angelo Leo	26–1 (12 KO)	1
WBO	December 9, 2023	Rafael Espinoza	28–0 (24 KO)	4

==== Current The Ring world rankings ====
As of October 18, 2026.

Keys:

C Current The Ring world champion

Rank	Name	Record	Title(s)
C	Vacant		
1	Rafael Espinoza	27–0 (23 KO)	WBO
2	Bruce Carrington	17–0 (10 KO)	WBC
3	Brandon Figueroa	27–2–1 (19 KO)	
4	Nick Ball	23–1–1 (13 KO)	
5	Ra'eese Aleem	23–1 (12 KO)	
6	Cristobal Lorente	21–0–3 (8 KO)	
7	Omar Trinidad	21–0–2 (14 KO)	
8	Lorenzo Parra	24–1–1 (18 KO)	
9	Albert Gonzalez	15–0 (8 KO)	
10	Liam Davies	18–1 (9 KO)	

==== Longest reigning world featherweight champions ====
Below is a list of longest reigning featherweight champions in boxing measured by the individual's longest reign. Career total time as champion (for multiple time champions) does not apply.

	Name	Title reign	Title recognition	Successful defenses	Beaten opponents	Fights
1.	Johnny Kilbane	11 years, 3 months, 24 days	World/NYSAC	4	2	
2.	Chris John	10 years, 1 month, 5 days	WBA	18	16	
3.	Abe Attell	8 years, 5 months, 19 days	World	22	14	
4.	Eusebio Pedroza	7 years, 1 month, 23 days	WBA	19	18	
5.	Gary Russell, Jr.	6 years, 9 month, 25 days	WBC	5	5	
6.	Sandy Saddler	6 years, 4 months, 13 days	World	4	3	
7.	Léo Santa Cruz	5 years, 10 months, 13 days	WBA (Super)	5	5	
8.	Naseem Hamed	4 years, 11 months, 20 days	WBO	15	15	
9.	George Dixon	4 years, 5 months	World	4	4	
10.	Antonio Esparragoza	4 years, 27 days	WBA	7	7	
11.	Davey Moore	4 years, 3 days	World	5	4	

==== Lineal Champions ====
- (New Zealand) Billy Murphy (1890-1891)
- (Australia) Young Griffo (1891) Vacated
- (Canada) George Dixon (1891-1897)
- (United States) Solly Smith (1897-1898)
- (Republic of Ireland) Dave Sullivan (1898)
- (Canada) George Dixon (1898-1900) (2)
- (United States) Terry McGovern (1900-1901)
- (United States) Young Corbett II (1901-1902) Vacated
- (United States) Abe Attell (1903-1912)
- (United States) Johnny Kilbane (1912-1923)
- (France) Eugene Criqui (1923)
- (United States) Johnny Dundee (1923–1924) Vacated
- (United States) Kid Kaplan (1925-1926) Vacated
- (United States) Tony Canzoneri (1928)
- (France) Andre Routis (1928-1929)
- (United States) Bat Battalino (1929-1932) Vacated
- (United States) Henry Armstrong (1937-1938) Vacated
- (United States) Joey Archibald (1939-1940)
- (United States) Harry Jeffra (1940-1941)
- (United States) Joey Archibald (1941)
- (United States) Chalky Wright (1941-1942)
- (United States) Willie Pep (1942-1948)
- (United States) Sandy Saddler (1948-1949)
- (United States) Willie Pep (1949-1950) (2)
- (United States) Sandy Saddler (1950-1957) (2) Retired
- (Nigeria) Hogan Bassey (1957-1959)
- (United States) Davey Moore (1959-1963)
- (Cuba) Sugar Ramos (1963-1964)
- (Mexico) Vicente Saldivar (1964-1967) Retired
- (Australia) Johnny Famechon (1969-1970)
- (Mexico) Vicente Saldivar (1970) (2)
- (Japan) Kuniaki Shibata (1970-1972)
- (Mexico) Clemente Sanchez (1972)
- (Spain) Jose Legra (1972-1973)
- (Brazil) Eder Jofre (1973-1974) Abandoned
- (Nicaragua) Alexis Arguello (1975-1977) Vacated
- (United States) Danny Lopez (1979-1980)
- (Mexico) Salvador Sanchez (1980-1982) Died
- (Panama) Eusebio Pedroza (1983-1986)
- (Republic of Ireland) Barry McGuigan (1986)
- (United States) Stevie Cruz (1986-1987)
- (Venezuela) Antonio Esparragoza (1987-1991)
- (South Korea) Yong-Kyun Park (1991-1993)
- (Venezuela) Eloy Rojas (1993-1996)
- (Puerto Rico) Wilfredo Vazquez (1996-1998)
- (England) Naseem Hamed (1998-2001)
- (Mexico) Marco Antonio Barrera (2001-2003)
- (Philippines) Manny Pacquiao (2003-2005) Vacated

==== Olympic champions ====
===== Men's =====
- 1904 – Oliver Kirk (USA)
- 1908 – Richard Gunn (GBR)
- 1920 – Paul Fritsch (FRA)
- 1924 – Jackie Fields (USA)
- 1928 – Bep van Klaveren (NED)
- 1932 – Carmelo Robledo (ARG)
- 1936 – Oscar Casanovas (ARG)
- 1948 – Ernesto Formenti (ITA)
- 1952 – Jan Zachara (TCH)
- 1956 – Vladimir Safronov (URS)
- 1960 – Francesco Musso (ITA)
- 1964 – Stanislav Stepashkin (URS)
- 1968 – Antonio Roldán (MEX)
- 1972 – Boris Kuznetsov (URS)
- 1976 – Ángel Herrera (CUB)
- 1980 – Rudi Fink (GDR)
- 1984 – Meldrick Taylor (USA)
- 1988 – Giovanni Parisi (ITA)
- 1992 – Andreas Tews (GER)
- 1996 – Somluck Kamsing (THA)
- 2000 – Bekzat Sattarkhanov (KAZ)
- 2004 – Alexei Tichtchenko (RUS)
- 2008 – Vasiliy Lomachenko (UKR)
- 2020 – Albert Batyrgaziev (ROC)
- 2024 – Abdumalik Khalokov (UZB)

==== Pan American Champions ====
- 1951 – (Argentina) Francisco Núñez (ARG)
- 1955 – (Argentina) Oswaldo Cañete (ARG)
- 1959 – (Argentina) Carlos Aro (ARG)
- 1963 – (Brazil) Rosemiro Mateus (BRA)
- 1967 – (Argentina) Miguel García (ARG)
- 1971 – (Mexico) Juan García (MEX)
- 1975 – Dave Armstrong (United States)
- 1979 – Bernard Taylor (United States)
- 1983 – (Cuba) Adolfo Horta (CUB)
- 1987 – Kelcie Banks (United States)
- 1991 – (Cuba) Arnaldo Mesa (CUB)
- 1995 – (Cuba) Arnaldo Mesa (CUB)
- 1999 – (Cuba) Yudel Johnson (CUB)
- 2003 – (Colombia) Likar Ramos Concha (COL)
- 2007 – (Cuba) Idel Torriente (CUB)

=== Notable featherweights ===
- Everett Backer “Baker”
- Alexis Argüello
- Henry Armstrong
- Abe Attell
- Marco Antonio Barrera
- Kid Chocolate
- Luisito Espinosa
- Wilfredo Gómez
- Wilfredo Vázquez
- Naseem Hamed
- Paul Ingle
- Chris 'The Dragon' John
- Tom "Boom Boom" Johnson
- Kevin Kelley
- Derrick Gainer
- Kina Malpartida
- Juan Manuel Márquez
- Barry McGuigan
- Érik Morales
- Azumah Nelson
- Manny Pacquiao
- Nonito "The Filipino Flash" Donaire
- Tommy Paul
- Willie Pep
- Sandy Saddler
- Calvin Grove
- Vicente Saldivar
- Salvador Sánchez
- Orlando Salido
- Miguel Ángel García
- Juan Manuel López
- Yuriorkis Gamboa
- Jeff Fenech
- Vasiliy Lomachenko

== Kickboxing ==
In kickboxing, a featherweight fighter generally weighs between 55 and 59 kg (121 and 130 lb). However, some governing bodies have slightly different classes. For example, the International Kickboxing Federation (IKF) featherweight division (professional and amateur) is between 122.1–127 lb (55.4–57.6 kg).

In Glory promotion, a featherweight division is up to 65 kg (143 lb).

In Bellator Kickboxing promotion, a featherweight division is up to 66 kg (146 lb).

In ONE Championship, the featherweight division limit is 70.3 kg (155 lb).

== Bare-knuckle boxing ==
The limit for featherweight generally differs among promotions in bare-knuckle boxing:

- In Bare Knuckle Fighting Championship, the featherweight division has an upper limit of 145 lb (66 kg).
- In BKB™, the featherweight division has an upper limit of 76 kg (168 lb).

== Lethwei ==
International Lethwei Federation Japan has a featherweight division with an upper limit of 65 kg (143 lb). In International Lethwei Federation Japan, Thar A Thae Ta Pwint is the Featherweight Champion.

In World Lethwei Championship, the featherweight division has an upper limit of 57 kg (126 lb).

== Mixed Martial Arts ==
In MMA, within the UFC company and most other MMA companies the featherweight range is from 136 to 145 lb (62 to 66 kg).

=== Current champions ===
These tables were last updated in July 2025.

Men:

Organization	Reign Began	Champion	Record	Defenses
UFC	April 13, 2025	(Australia) Alexander Volkanovski	27-4 (13KO 3SUB)	0
PFL	September 10, 2026	(Kyrgyzstan) Razhabali Shaydullaev	20–0 (7KO 12SUB)	1
ONE Championship	August 26, 2022	(China) Tang Kai	15–2 (12KO 0SUB)	0
ACA	July 22, 2022	(Russia) Alikhan Suleymanov	15–2 (1KO 10SUB)	0
Cage Warriors	November 4, 2022	(England) Paul Hughes	9–1 (3KO 3SUB)	0
KSW	December 18, 2021	(France) Salahdine Parnasse	21–2 (6KO 7SUB)	2
M-1 Global		Vacant		
AMC Fight Nights	October 14, 2022	(Russia) Gleb Khabibulin	7–1–2 (4KO 3SUB)	0
Brave Combat Federation	October 22, 2022	(Russia) Roman Bogatov	13–1 (1KO 5SUB)	0
Titan FC	August 6, 2021	(Jordan) Ali al-Qaisi	12–5 (2KO 4SUB)	0
Legacy Fighting Alliance		Vacant		
Road FC	December 18, 2022	(South Korea) Hae Jin Park	10–2 (1KO 4SUB)	0

Women:

Organization	Reign Began	Champion	Record	Defenses
Bellator MMA	January 25, 2020	(Brazil) Cris Cyborg	29–2 (1) (20KO 1SUB)	4
UFC	December 29, 2018	(Brazil) Amanda Nunes	21–5 (13KO 3SUB)	2
Invicta FC		Vacant		

== See also ==
- Boxing weight classes
- Reigning boxing champions
