= Eduardo Hernández (boxer) =

Mexican boxer (born 1997)

Personal information
- Nickname: Rocky
- Born: Eduardo Alejandro Pérez Hernández; 21 November 1997 (age 28) Mexico City, Distrito Federal, Mexico
- Height: 1.69 m (5 ft 7 in)
- Weight: Super featherweight; Featherweight; Super bantamweight

Boxing career
- Reach: 173 cm (68 in)
- Stance: Orthodox

Boxing record
- Total fights: 39
- Wins: 37
- Win by KO: 32
- Losses: 2

Eduardo Alejandro Pérez Hernández also known as Rocky Hernández (born 27 November 1997) is a Mexican professional boxer who challenged for the WBC super featherweight title.

== Professional career ==
=== Debut ===
On 8 February 2014, at only 16 years old, Hernández made his debut against Geovanni Zamora, 3–1, 1KO in Caballerizas de Huixquilucan at Huixquilucan Municipality, Mexico, Hernández won via unanimous decision.

=== Rise up the ranks ===
==== Hernández vs. Terrazas ====
After composing a perfect record of 19–0, 16KOs, Hernández fought former WBC super bantamweight world champion Victor Terrazas for the vacant WBC Latino interim super featherweight title, Hernández blasts out Terrazas in two rounds.

Hernández fought against South American title-challenger Argentine Hugo Santillán for the vacant WBC Youth super featherweight title, Hernández won via 3rd-round TKO. Hernández would make his first defence of the title against former WBO Oriental interim bantamweight titlist and WBO Inter-Continental lightweight title-challenger Filipino Rolando Magbanua, Hernández won via first-round knockout.

==== Hernández vs. Francisco ====
After successfully defending his title twice more after his victory against Magbanua, Hernández fought former WBA interim super flyweight champion "Gintong Kamao" Drian Francisco in Teatro Molière, Mexico City at a non-titled bout, Hernández won via second-round stoppage.

On 14 July 2018, Hernández continued his unbeaten streak, defending his WBC Youth strap against 24–2, Dominican Marlyn Cabrera in Arena Coliseo, Mexico City, Hernández won via stoppage in the first round. On 30 March 2019, Hernández made his United States debut against Tanzanian former minor title Global Boxing Council (GBC) super featherweight and lightweight champion Ibrahim Class Mgender in Fantasy Springs Resort Casino, Indio, California, U.S., Hernández prevailed with second-round KO victory.

==== Hernández vs. Gutiérrez ====
On 13 July 2019, Hernández fought eventual WBA "Regular" super featherweight champion Roger Gutiérrez in Dignity Health Sports Park, Carson, California, Hernández suffers his first defeat, losing via first-round knockout.

==== Hernández vs. Castaneda ====
After winning three bouts prior to his loss against Gutiérrez, Hernández fought American Jorge Castaneda for the WBC International Silver super featherweight title in Domo Alcade at Guadalajara, Hernández won via stoppage in the first round, the bout only lasting 1 minute and 35 seconds.

==== Hernández vs. Foster ====
During the annual WBC convention, held on 9 November 2022, the sanctioning body ordered the winner of the vacant championship bout between O'Shaquie Foster and Rey Vargas to make two mandatory title defenses: first against the once-defeated Hernández and the second against the winner of the Muhammadkhuja Yaqubov and Robson Conceição title eliminator. As Foster failed to reach an agreement with Hernández, a purse bid was called for 8 August 2023. The promotional rights were secured by Matchroom Boxing, who put in a winning bid of $466,666. The fight took place on 28 October 2023, in Hernández's home country of Mexico. Though the fight seemed competitive through the first 10 rounds, Foster was behind on two of the three judges scorecards. The eleventh round was a round of the year contender, Foster rocked Hernández early but Hernández battled back and hurt Foster in turn. In the twelfth and final round Foster finally took over, dropping Hernández twice and successfully defending his title via TKO.

=== Road back to contention ===
==== Hernández vs. Lugo ====
Hernández was scheduled to fight Daniel Lugo for the vacant WBA Continental Americas super featherweight championship on 11 May 2024, at Palenque de la Feria located in Aguascalientes. Hernández won via seventh-round TKO.

==== Hernández vs. Mattice ====
On 13 September in Arena Sonora, Hermosillo, Hernández, successfully defended his WBA Continental Americas super featherweight title whilst maintaining his top spot in the WBC rankings against Thomas Mattice as their fight ended controversially, acter the sixth round, Hernández's corner men struggled to plug the second cut, referee Mark Calo-oy waved off the fight ruling a technical decision, ruling that both cuts were from headbutt, which video evidence shows otherwise. Hernández won with the announced scores of 59–55, 58–55 and 58–56, with one of the judges' scorecards represented wrong as David Diamante incorrectly announced it as 58–55 instead of 58–56, this is also Hernández's first bout that went to the scorecards since his 9 August, 2014th battle against Felipe Zúñiga.

==== Hernández vs. Giron ====
Hernández is scheduled to face Rene Tellez Giron in Gatineau, QC, Canada on 28 February 2025.

== Personal life ==
Eduardo Alejandro Hernández Peréz was born on 21 November 1997, in Mexico City, Distrito Federal, Mexico and fought across Mexico, he started professionally boxing at the age of 16 years old.

== Professional boxing record ==
39 fights	37 wins	2 losses
By knockout	32	2
By decision	5	0

No.	Result	Record	Opponent	Type	Round, time	Date	Location	Notes
39	Win	37–2	René Téllez Girón	UD	12	28 February 2025	Hilton Lac Leamy, Gatineau, Canada	
38	Win	36–2	Thomas Mattice	TD	6 (12), 3:00	13 September 2024	Arena Sonora, Hermosillo, Mexico	Retained WBA Continental Americas super featherweight title; Unanimous TD: Hernández could not continue from a cut in the left eye, referee ruled it was caused by a headbutt
37	Win	35–2	Daniel Lugo	TKO	7 (12)	11 May 2024	Palenque de la Feria, Aguascalientes, Mexico	Won vacant WBA Continental Americas super featherweight title
36	Loss	34–2	O'Shaquie Foster	TKO	12 (12), 2:38	28 October 2023	Polifórum Benito Juárez, Cancún, Mexico	For WBC super featherweight title
35	Win	34–1	Héctor García Montes	KO	3 (10), 0:25	7 July 2023	Cintermex, Monterrey, Mexico	
34	Win	33–1	Jorge Mata Cuéllar	TKO	5 (10), 1:15	3 September 2022	Centro de Usos Múltiples, Hermosillo, Mexico	Retained WBC International Silver super featherweight title
33	Win	32–1	Jorge Castaneda	TKO	1 (10), 1:35	10 June 2022	Domo Alcade, Guadalajara, Mexico	Won WBC International Silver super featherweight title
32	Win	31–1	Eleazar Valenzuela Carillo	TKO	2 (10), 0:50	16 December 2021	Arena La Paz, La Paz, Mexico	
31	Win	30–1	Eduardo Garza	KO	3 (8), 2:37	19 November 2020	Wild Card Gym, Los Angeles, California, U.S.	
30	Win	29–1	Sergio Puente	RTD	5 (10), 3:00	30 November 2019	Centro de Espectáculos Victoria, Ciudad Victoria, Mexico	
29	Loss	28–1	Roger Gutiérrez	KO	1 (10), 2:39	13 July 2019	Dignity Health Sports Park, Carson, California, U.S.	
28	Win	28–0	Ibrahim Class Mgender	KO	2 (10), 1:58	30 March 2019	Fantasy Springs Casino, Indio, California, U.S.	
27	Win	27–0	Luis Díaz Pestana	TKO	2 (12), 2:45	13 October 2018	Sala de Armas Agustín Melgar, Mexico City, Mexico	Retained WBC Youth super featherweight title
26	Win	26–0	Marlyn Cabrera	TKO	1 (12), 2:16	14 July 2018	Arena Coliseo, Mexico City, Mexico	Retained WBC Youth super featherweight title
25	Win	25–0	Drian Francisco	RTD	2 (10), 3:00	26 May 2018	Teatro Moliere, Mexico City, Mexico	
24	Win	24–0	Rafael Hernández	KO	4 (10)	9 December 2017	Palenque de la Feria del Caballo, Texcoco, Mexico	Retained WBC Youth super featherweight title
23	Win	23–0	Raúl Horacio Centeno	KO	3 (10), 1:41	2 September 2017	Centro de Espectáculos de la Feria de León, León, Mexico	Retained WBC Youth super featherweight title
22	Win	22–0	Rolando Magbanua	KO	1 (10), 2:24	24 June 2017	Gimnasio Municipal "José Neri Santos", Ciudad Juárez, Mexico	Retained WBC Youth super featherweight title
21	Win	21–0	Hugo Alfredo Santillán	TKO	3 (10), 1:47	1 April 2017	Zócalo, Mexico City, Mexico	Won vacant WBC Youth super featherweight title
20	Win	20–0	Victor Terrazas	KO	2 (12), 2:59	22 October 2016	Arena Coliseo, Mexico City, Mexico	Won vacant WBC Latino interim super featherweight title
19	Win	19–0	Rey Juntilla	TKO	2 (8), 3:07	27 August 2016	Arena Coliseo, Mexico City, Mexico	
18	Win	18–0	Warren Manbuanag	KO	2 (10), 1:51	11 June 2016	Arena Coliseo, Mexico City, Mexico	
17	Win	17–0	Devis Pérez	KO	3 (8), 0:50	9 April 2016	Auditorio Benito Juárez, Veracruz, Mexico	
16	Win	16–0	Julio David Roque Ler	RTD	3 (8), 3:00	5 March 2016	Centro Regional de Deporte de Las Américas, Ecatepec de Morelos, Mexico	
15	Win	15–0	Óscar Gutiérrez	RTD	1 (4), 3:00	12 December 2015	Auditorio BB, Mexico City, Mexico	
14	Win	14–0	Luis Guiza Tejeda	TKO	1 (8)	31 October 2015	Arena Coliseo, Mexico City, Mexico	
13	Win	13–0	Héctor Esnar Bobadilla	KO	1 (6), 2:50	5 September 2015	Centro de Espectáculos Recinto Ferial, Metepec, Mexico	
12	Win	12–0	Sebastián Díaz Maldonado	TKO	2 (6), 2:15	27 June 2015	Centro Civico de Ecatepec, Ecatepec de Morelos, Mexico	
11	Win	11–0	Wilberth Venancio	KO	2 (6), 2:40	30 May 2015	Estadio Carlos Serdan, Veracruz, Mexico	
10	Win	10–0	Rogelio López	TKO	? (?)	25 April 2015	Arena Coliseo, Mexico City, Mexico	
9	Win	9–0	Germán Pérez	KO	1 (6), 1:46	4 April 2015	Unidad Deportiva Martín Alarcón, Metepec, Mexico	
8	Win	8–0	José Javier Regalado	TKO	1 (6), 2:53	14 March 2015	Auditorio Municipal, Naucalpan, Mexico	
7	Win	7–0	Omar Herrera	KO	4 (6)	21 November 2014	José Cuervo Salón, Mexico City, Mexico	
6	Win	6–0	Felipe Zúñiga	UD	6	9 August 2014	Arena Monterrey, Monterrey, Mexico	
5	Win	5–0	Bryan Alexis Ramírez Santiago	TKO	1 (6)	21 June 2014	Foro Polanco, Mexico City, Mexico	
4	Win	4–0	Cristan Rodríguez	UD	6	7 June 2014	Auditorio Municipal, Tetla, Mexico	
3	Win	3–0	Julio César Meléndez Navarette	TKO	1 (4), 2:32	23 May 2014	Auditorio Ferrocerrilero, Monterrey, Mexico	
2	Win	2–0	Édgar Tovar Guerrero	KO	2 (4), 2:55	22 March 2014	Arena Monterrey, Monterrey, Mexico	
1	Win	1–0	Geovanni Zamora	UD	4	8 February 2024	Caballerizas de Huixquilucan, Huixquilucan, Mexico	
