= Magbanua =

Magbanua (from Cebuano banwa with the meaning "city, town") is a Cebuano and Tagalog surname and may refer to:

- Katherine Magbanua, Filipino woman charged with murder-for-hire of Dan Markel
- Rolando Magbanua (born 1985), Filipino boxer
- Teresa Magbanua (1868–1947), Filipino schoolteacher and military leader
- Vincent Magbanua (born 2000), Filipino child actor
