= Otabek Kholmatov =

Uzbekistani boxer (born 1998)

Personal information
- Nationality: Uzbekistan
- Born: 22 July 1998 (age 27) Sirdarya, Uzbekistan
- Height: 1.70 m (5 ft 7 in)
- Weight: Featherweight 54-57kg

Boxing career
- Stance: Orthodox

Boxing record
- Total fights: 14
- Wins: 13
- Win by KO: 12
- Losses: 1
Medal record
Men's amateur boxing
Representing Uzbekistan
Youth World Championships
Bronze medal – third place	2016 St. Petersburg	Flyweight

Otabek Kholmatov (Uzbek: Xolmatov Otabek Shuxrat o`g`li ру: Отабек Холматов, born July 22, 1998) is an Uzbekistani boxer who competes in the featherweight category. He was the bronze medalist of 2016 AIBA Youth World Boxing Championships in the flyweight category as an amateur.

== Amateur career ==
In September 2015, he became the champion of Uzbekistan among young men in the first lightest weight category (up to 49 kg).

=== 2016 AIBA Youth World Boxing Championships ===
In November 2016, he became the bronze medalist of the World Championship among young men in the lightest weight category (up to 52 kg)

Round of 32: Defeated Fatkhidin Khamroyev (Kyrgyzstan) 4-1

Round of 16: Defeated Istvan Szaka (Hungary) 5–0

Quarter-finals: Defeated Darwin Martinez Calero (Nicaragua) 5–0

Semi-finals: Defeated by Hayato Tsutsumi (Japan)

==== Uzbekistan Championship 2017 ====
He performed in the lightest weight category (up to 56 kg). Ravshanbek Aminov won in the 1/8 finals. In the quarterfinals, he lost to Mirazizbek Mirzakhalilov.

==== Uzbekistan Championship 2018 ====
He competed in the featherweight category (up to 57 kg). Khusrav Soatov won in the 1/32 finals. In the 1/16 finals, Dostonbek Ulzhaboev won. Ravshanbek Aminov won in the 1/8 finals. Abdulla Kuchkarov won in the quarterfinals. Mirazizbek Mirzakhalilov won in the semifinals. In the final, he lost to Abdulkhai Shorakhmatov.

==== Uzbekistan Championship 2019 ====
He competed in the 1st welterweight category (up to 64 kg). Temurmalik Adhamov won in the 1/8 finals. Boburmirzo Tolibov won in the quarterfinals. In the semifinals, he lost to Mujibillo Tursunov.

== Professional career ==
Kholmatov made his professional debut against Marcello Williams on 13 August 2021 and won the bout in the first round with KO. In March 2023, he won British Thomas Patrick Ward with TKO

On May 30, 2023 WBA Formally ordered Mandatory Title Fight for Otabek Khlomatov vs Leigh Wood

Kholmatov was scheduled to face Raymond Ford for the vacant WBA featherweight title in Verona, New York. He lost the fight by TKO in the 12th round. Afterwards, it was revealed that during the fight Kholmatov had suffered ACL tear.

Kholmatov is scheduled to face Jason Canoy Manigos in a featherweight bout in Astana, Kazakhstan on April 5, 2025.

== Professional boxing record ==
14 fights	13 wins	1 loss
By knockout	12	1
By decision	1	0

No.	Result	Record	Opponent	Type	Round Time	Date	Location	Notes
14	Win	13–1	Jason Canoy Manigos	TKO	8 (8), 2:07	Apr 5, 2025	Barys Arena, Astana, Kazakhstan	
13	Loss	12–1	Raymond Ford	TKO	12 (12), 2:53	Mar 2, 2024	Turning Stone Resort & Casino, Verona, USA	For vacant WBA featherweight title
12	Win	12–0	Balam Hernandez Acosta	TKO	8 (8), 2:31	Dec 9, 2023	San Francisco del Rincon, Mexico	
11	Win	11–0	Thomas Patrick Ward	TKO	5 (12), 2:58	Mar 4, 2023	Utilita Arena, Newcastle upon Tyne, England	
10	Win	10-0	Andranik Grigoryan	UD	12 (12)	Mar 26, 2022	Caribe Royale Orlando, Orlando, Florida, U.S.	
9	Win	9-0	Adrian Morel Solis	TKO	4 (8), 0:38	Dec 21, 2021	Hotel Catalonia Malecon Center, Santo Domingo, Dominican Republic	
8	Win	8-0	Juan Carlos Pena	TKO	2 (10), 2:56	Dec 4, 2021	Discoteca High Caribbean, Sosúa, Dominican Republic	
7	Win	7–0	Steven Herrera	KO	3 (8), 2:06	Nov 10, 2021	Hostal Camping Yolimar, Tolú, Colombia	
6	Win	6–0	Pedro Ramirez	KO	3 (6), 2:45	Nov 4, 2021	Coliseo Luis Patron Rossano, Tolú, Colombia	
5	Win	5–0	Pablo Gomez	KO	3 (4)	Oct 28, 2021	Centro Recreacional Tempo, Tolú, Colombia	
4	Win	4–0	Juan Gabriel Medina	KO	2 (10) 1:51	Oct 23, 2021	Convention Center, Tampa, Florida, U.S.	
3	Win	3–0	Roberto Lopez	KO	1 (4) 2:40	Sep 10, 2021	Coliseo Luis Patron Rossano, Tolú, Colombia	
2	Win	2–0	Carlos Ovando	TKO	3 (6) 0:52	Aug 27, 2021	White sands Events Center, Plant City, Florida, U.S.	
1	Win	1–0	Marcella Williams	KO	1 (6) 2:58	Aug 13, 2021	Osceola Heritage Park, Kissimmee, Florida, U.S.	
