= Edward Vazquez =

American boxer (born 1995)

Personal information
- Nickname: Kid
- Born: Edward Alejandro Vazquez; September 20, 1995 (age 31) Fort Worth, Texas, U.S
- Height: 5 ft 7 in (170 cm)
- Weight: Featherweight; Super featherweight

Boxing career
- Reach: 65 in (165 cm)
- Stance: Orthodox

Boxing record
- Total fights: 25
- Wins: 20
- Win by KO: 6
- Losses: 4
- No contests: 1

Edward Vazquez (born September 20, 1995) is an American professional boxer. He has twice challenged for world titles.

== Boxing career ==
Vazquez made his professional debut against Willie Miller on February 18, 2016, where he won by unanimous decision. He began his pro boxing career with 11 straight wins before suffering his first defeat against Raymond Ford by split decision on February 5, 2022, at the Footprint Center im Phoenix, Arizona. The result was controversial, with Ford's promoter Eddie Hearn stating after the bout that he believed Vazquez had won.

Vazquez challenged Joe Cordina for the IBF super-featherweight title at Casino de Monte Carlo in Monte Carlo, Monaco, on November 4, 2023, but lost by majority decision.

On May 4, 2025, Vazquez lost to Rafael Espinoza in a bout at T-Mobile Arena in Las Vegas for the WBO featherweight title that was stopped in the seventh round.

He faced Daniel Lugo at College Park Center in Arlington, Texas on June 5, 2026, with the vacant WBC USA super-featherweight title on the line. Vazquez won via unanimous decision.

Vazquez challenged NABF featherweight champion Albert Gonzalez at Frost Bank Center in San Antonio, Texas, on October 24, 2026, losing by knockout in the second round.

== Professional boxing record ==
25 fights	20 wins	4 losses
By knockout	6	2
By decision	14	2
No contests	1	

No.	Result	Record	Opponent	Type	Round, time	Date	Location	Notes
25	Loss	20–4 (1)	Albert Gonzalez	KO	2 (10), 1:04	24 Oct 2026	Frost Bank Center, San Antonio, Texas U.S	For NABF featherweight title
24	Win	20–3 (1)	Daniel Lugo	UD	10	5 Jun 2026	College Park Center, Arlington, Texas, U.S	Won vacant WBC USA super-featherweight title
23	Win	19–3 (1)	Grimardi Machuca	RTD	5 (10), 3:00	27 Feb 2026	College Park Center, Arlington, Texas, U.S	
22	Win	18–3 (1)	Albeiro Paredes	TKO	5 (8), 1:56	14 Nov 2025	OCC Road House and Museum, Clearwater, Florida, U.S	
21	Loss	17–3 (1)	Rafael Espinoza	TKO	7 (12), 1:47	4 May 2025	T-Mobile Arena, Paradise, Nevada, U.S.	For WBO featherweight title
20	Win	17–2 (1)	Kenneth Taylor	RTD	4 (10), 3:00	23 Oct 2024	Madison Square Garden Theater, New York, New York, U.S	
19	Win	16–2 (1)	Daniel Bailey	UD	8	3 May 2024	Red Owl Boxing Arena, Houston, Texas, U.S	
18	Loss	15–2 (1)	Joe Cordina	MD	12	4 Nov 2023	Casino de Monte Carlo, Monte Carlo, Monaco	For IBF super-featherweight title
17	Win	15–1 (1)	Brayan De Gracia	UD	10	29 Jul 2023	Riders Field, Frisco, Texas, U.S	
16	Win	14–1 (1)	Misael Lopez	SD	10	17 Feb 2023	Stormont Vail Event Center, Topeka, Kansas, U.S	
15	Win	13–1 (1)	Viktor Slavinskyi	SD	8	8 Oct 2022	Dignity Health Sports Park, Carson, California, U.S.	
14	Win	12–1 (1)	Jose Argel	UD	8	9 July 2022	2300 Arena, Philadelphia, Pennsylvania, U.S	
13	Loss	11–1 (1)	Raymond Ford	SD	10	5 Feb 2022	Footprint Center, Phoenix, Arizona, U.S.	
12	Win	11–0 (1)	Ezequiel Alberto Tevez	TKO	1 (6), 1:33	5 Nov 2021	Southern Junction Nightclub, Irving, Texas, U.S	
11	Win	10–0 (1)	Yeison Vargas	KO	4 (6), 1:39	26 Jun 2021	Bonaventure Resort Spa, Weston, Florida, U.S	
10	Win	9–0 (1)	Irvin Gonzalez	SD	8	Nov 28, 2020	Staples Center, Los Angeles, California, U.S.	
9	Win	8–0 (1)	Adan Ochoa	UD	6	5 Sep 2020	MGM Grand Conference Center, Paradise, Nevada, U.S.	
8	Win	7–0 (1)	Alejandro Moreno	KO	3 (4), 2:28	23 Nov 2019	Mesquite Arena, Mesquite, Texas, U.S	
7	Win	6–0 (1)	Brandon Cruz	SD	6	31 Jan 2019	Viejas Casino and Resort, Alpine, California, U.S	
6	Win	5–0 (1)	Brandon Arvie	UD	6	9 Feb 2018	The Bomb Factory, Dallas, Texas, U.S	
5	Win	4–0 (1)	Manuel Rubalcava	UD	4	1 Dec 2017	Gas Monkey Bar N' Grill, Dallas, Texas, U.S	
4	Win	3–0 (1)	Thomas Smith	UD	4	29 Sep 2017	Gilley's, Dallas, Texas, U.S	
3	Win	2–0 (1)	Everardo Jhoao	UD	4	2 Sep 2017	Arena Itson, Ciudad Obregón, Mexico	
2	NC	1–0 (1)	Abraham Torres	NC	4	23 Feb 2017	Frontiers of Flight Museum, Dallas, Texas, U.S	
1	Win	1–0	Willie Miller	UD	4	18 Feb 2016	Frontiers of Flight Museum, Dallas, Texas, U.S	
