= Abraham Nova =

Puerto Rican boxer (born 1994)

Personal information
- Nickname: Supernova
- Nationality: Puerto Rican
- Born: Abraham Nova; January 14, 1994 (age 32) Carolina, Puerto Rico
- Height: 5 ft 9 in (175 cm)
- Weight: Featherweight; Super featherweight
- Website: https://www.abrahamsupernova.com/

Boxing career
- Reach: 72 in (183 cm)
- Stance: Orthodox

Boxing record
- Total fights: 29
- Wins: 24
- Win by KO: 17
- Losses: 4
- Draws: 1

Abraham Nova (born January 14, 1994) is a Puerto Rican professional boxer.

== Early life ==
Abraham Nova was born on January 14, 1994, in Carolina, Puerto Rico, to Dominican parents. He moved to the U.S. with his parents and nine siblings when he was an infant, with all twelve family members living in a two-bedroom apartment in Albany, New York. He began boxing at the age of 12, going on to compile an amateur record of 167–11–60KOs before turning professional.

== Professional career ==
Nova made his professional debut on April 29, 2016, scoring a first-round technical knockout (TKO) victory over Weusi Johnson at the Trump Taj Mahal in Atlantic City, New Jersey.

After compiling a record of 12–0 (10 KOs) he faced Sulaiman Segawa for the vacant WBA-NABA super featherweight title on November 18, 2018, at the Royale Nightclub in Boston, Massachusetts. Nova defeated Sulaiman via unanimous decision (UD) to capture his first professional title, with one judge scoring the bout 97–93 and the other two scoring it 96–93. After two wins in non-title fights – a UD against Brian Pelaez in December 2018 and a TKO against Mario Lozano in May 2019 – he made the first defence of his WBA-NABA title against Luis Castillo on August 23, 2019, at the Encore Boston Harbor in Everett, Massachusetts. With less than 30 seconds remaining in the first round, Nova landed a left-jab right-hand combination to drop Castillo to the canvas. Castillo was unable to make it to his feet before the referee's count of ten, awarding Nova a first-round knockout (KO) victory.

Nova was booked to face Pedro Navarrete in a non-title bout on January 18, 2020. He won the fight by a fourth-round technical knockout. Nova faced Avery Sparrow on June 25, 2020. He won the fight by unanimous decision, with scores of 99–91, 97–93 and 96–94. Nova was scheduled to face the journeyman Richard Pumicpic on the Joshua Franco vs Andrew Moloney III undercard on August 14, 2021. He won the fight by unanimous decision, with one judge scoring the fight 78–74 for him, while the remaining two judges scored the fight 79–73 in his favor. Nova faced Willam Encarnación on January 15, 2022, in the Joe Smith Jr. vs Steve Geffrard WBO co-headliner. He won the fight by an eight-round technical knockout.

=== Nova vs. Foster ===
On February 16, 2024, Nova was scheduled to challenge O'Shaquie Foster for the WBC junior lightweight title at The Theater at Madison Square Garden in New York. He lost the fight by split decision.

=== Nova vs. Cortes ===
Nova was scheduled to face Andres Cortes in a 10-round junior lightweight bout at Fontainebleau Las Vegas on June 21, 2024. He lost the fight by unanimous decision.

=== Nova vs. Galindo ===
Nova faced Humberto Galindo at Turning Stone Resort Casino in Verona, New York on November 2, 2024, with the fight ending in a draw.

=== Nova vs. Ford ===
On 16 August 2025, Nova lost to Raymond Ford by unanimous decision in Riyadh, Saudi Arabia, on the undercard of the Moses Itauma vs Dillian Whyte fight.

== Professional boxing record ==
| 29 fights | 24 wins | 4 losses |
|---|---|---|
| By knockout | 17 | 1 |
| By decision | 7 | 3 |
| Draws | 1 | |

| No. | Result | Record | Opponent | Type | Round, time | Date | Location | Notes |
|---|---|---|---|---|---|---|---|---|
| 29 | Loss | 24–4–1 | Raymond Ford | UD | 10 | Aug 16, 2025 | anb Arena, Riyadh, Saudi Arabia | |
| 28 | Win | 24–3–1 | Germán Meraz | RTD | 3 (8), 3:00 | Jun 7, 2025 | Fenway Park, Boston, Massachusetts, U.S. | |
| 27 | Draw | 23–3–1 | Humberto Galindo | SD | 10 | Nov 2, 2024 | Turning Stone Resort & Casino, Verona, New York, U.S. | |
| 26 | Loss | 23–3 | Andres Cortes | UD | 10 | Jun 21, 2024 | Fontainebleau Las Vegas, Winchester, Nevada, U.S. | Vacant WBO-NABO super featherweight title only at stake for Nova as Cortes misses weight |
| 25 | Loss | 23–2 | O'Shaquie Foster | SD | 12 | Feb 16, 2024 | The Theater at Madison Square Garden, New York City, New York, U.S. | For WBC super featherweight title |
| 24 | Win | 23–1 | Jonatan Romero | KO | 3 (10), 2:47 | Jul 28, 2023 | Palms Casino Resort, Paradise, Nevada, U.S. | |
| 23 | Win | 22–1 | Adam Lopez | UD | 10 | Jan 14, 2023 | Turning Stone Resort & Casino, Verona, New York, U.S. | |
| 22 | Loss | 21–1 | Robeisy Ramírez | KO | 5 (10), 2:20 | Jun 18, 2022 | Hulu Theater, New York City, New York, U.S. | |
| 21 | Win | 21–0 | William Encarnación | TKO | 8 (10), 1:22 | Jan 15, 2022 | Turning Stone Resort & Casino, Verona, New York, U.S. | |
| 20 | Win | 20–0 | Richard Pumicpic | UD | 8 | Aug 14, 2021 | Hard Rock Hotel & Casino, Tulsa, Oklahoma, U.S. | |
| 19 | Win | 19–0 | Avery Sparrow | UD | 10 | Jun 25, 2020 | MGM Grand Conference Center, Paradise, Nevada, U.S. | |
| 18 | Win | 18–0 | Pedro Navarrete | TKO | 4 (8), 0:35 | Jan 18, 2020 | Turning Stone Resort Casino, Verona, New York, U.S. | |
| 17 | Win | 17–0 | Sandro Hernandez | KO | 4 (8), 2:21 | Oct 19, 2019 | Dôme, Charleroi, Belgium | |
| 16 | Win | 16–0 | Luis Castillo | KO | 1 (10), 2:42 | Aug 23, 2019 | Encore Boston Harbor, Everett, Massachusetts, U.S. | Retained WBA-NABA super featherweight title |
| 15 | Win | 15–0 | Mario Ezequiel Sayal Lozano | TKO | 2 (10), 2:26 | May 10, 2019 | MGM Springfield, Springfield, Massachusetts, U.S. | |
| 14 | Win | 14–0 | Brian Pelaez | UD | 8 | Dec 15, 2018 | RTL Spiroudome, Charleroi, Belgium | |
| 13 | Win | 13–0 | Sulaiman Segawa | UD | 10 | Nov 18, 2018 | Royale Nightclub, Boston, Massachusetts, U.S. | Won vacant WBA-NABA super featherweight title |
| 12 | Win | 12–0 | Hassan Nourdine | KO | 7 (8), 1:20 | May 19, 2018 | RTL Spiroudome, Charleroi, Belgium | |
| 11 | Win | 11–0 | Fatiou Fassinou | UD | 6 | Apr 28, 2018 | Plainridge Park Casino, Plainville, Massachusetts, U.S. | |
| 10 | Win | 10–0 | Tyrome Jones | TKO | 2 (6), 2:20 | Feb 24, 2018 | Mohegan Sun Arena, Uncasville, Connecticut, U.S. | |
| 9 | Win | 9–0 | Milan Savic | TKO | 2 (6), 1:52 | Dec 16, 2017 | RTL Spiroudome, Charleroi, Belgium | |
| 8 | Win | 8–0 | Dato Nanava | TKO | 2 (6), 2:55 | Oct 21, 2017 | Andenne Arena, Andenne, Belgium | |
| 7 | Win | 7–0 | Andres Zapata | TKO | 1 (8), 2:31 | Jun 24, 2017 | Hotel Jaragua, Santo Domingo, Dominican Republic | |
| 6 | Win | 6–0 | Martin Nicolas Matamala | TKO | 5 (6), 0:01 | May 13, 2017 | Centro de Convenciones, Punta del Este, Uruguay | |
| 5 | Win | 5–0 | Sergio Lucas | KO | 1 (6), 2:05 | Mar 4, 2017 | Arena Jalisco, Guadalajara, Mexico | |
| 4 | Win | 4–0 | Joshua Santos | TKO | 2 (6), 2:02 | Dec 10, 2016 | Sands Bethlehem Event Center, Bethlehem, Pennsylvania, U.S. | |
| 3 | Win | 3–0 | Willy Morillo | TKO | 4 (6), 1:34 | Sep 23, 2016 | Salon de Eventos P.C. Sambil, Santo Domingo, Dominican Republic | |
| 2 | Win | 2–0 | Wilfredo Garriga | MD | 6 | Aug 21, 2016 | Ford Amphitheater, New York City, New York, U.S. | |
| 1 | Win | 1–0 | Weusi Johnson | TKO | 1 (4), 2:56 | Apr 29, 2016 | Trump Taj Mahal, Atlantic City, New Jersey, U.S. | |

Sporting positions
Regional boxing titles
| Vacant Title last held by Carlos Morales | WBA-NABA super featherweight champion November 18, 2018 – present | Incumbent |
