= Nick Ball (boxer) =

English boxer (born 1997)

Personal information
- Nickname: Wrecking Ball
- Nationality: British
- Born: 28 February 1997 (age 29) Kirkby, Merseyside, England
- Height: 5 ft 2 in (157 cm)
- Weight: Featherweight; Super featherweight

Boxing career
- Reach: 65 in (165 cm)
- Stance: Orthodox

Boxing record
- Total fights: 25
- Wins: 23
- Win by KO: 13
- Losses: 1
- Draws: 1

Nick Ball (born 28 February 1997) is a British professional boxer. He held the World Boxing Association (WBA) featherweight title from 2024 to 2026.

== Professional career ==
=== Ball vs. Vargas ===
Ball turned professional in 2017 and compiled a 19–0 record before facing WBC featherweight champion Rey Vargas on 8 March 2024. The fight ended as a split draw with Vargas retaining his title.

=== WBA Featherweight Champion ===
==== Ball vs. Ford ====
Ball challenged Raymond Ford for the WBA featherweight title on 1 June 2024 in Riyadh, Saudi Arabia. Ball defeated Ford by split decision (113–115, 115–113, 115–113) and won the title.

==== Ball vs. Rios ====
Ball made the first defence of his world title against Ronny Rios at the M&S Bank Arena in Liverpool on 5 October 2024. He won the fight in the 10th round, after Rios' corner threw in the towel.

==== Ball vs. Doheny ====
On 12 December 2024, it was announced that Ball would make the second defence of his title against TJ Doheny at M&S Bank Arena in Liverpool on 15 March 2025. Ball won the fight by stoppage when Doheny's corner stopped the fight at the end of the 10th round.

==== Ball vs. Goodman ====
Ball was scheduled to make the third defence of his title against Australian boxer Sam Goodman, on 16 August 2025, in Riyadh, Saudi Arabia. Ball won by unanimous decision as the judges scored the contest 118–110, 117–111 and 115–113.

==== Ball vs. Figueroa ====
Ball was scheduled to make the fourth defence of his title against former two-weight world champion Brandon Figueroa in Liverpool, England, on 7 February 2026. Figueroa knocked Ball out in the 12th round to win his WBA featherweight title, and become a three-weight world champion. As Ball received medical attention, Figueroa and his team celebrated in the ring, causing Ball's fans to throw objects at them. Andrew Cain and Brad Strand also attempted to jump through the ropes but were stopped by security. Figueroa later apologised and praised Ball, calling him "a great Liverpool champion and one of the best England has ever had."

==== Ball vs. Cacace ====
Ball is scheduled to challenge Anthony Cacace for his WBA super featherweight title at The O2 Belfast in Northern Ireland, on 19 December 2026.

== Professional boxing record ==
| 25 fights | 23 wins | 1 loss |
|---|---|---|
| By knockout | 13 | 1 |
| By decision | 10 | 0 |
| Draws | 1 | |

| No. | Result | Record | Opponent | Type | Round, time | Date | Location | Notes |
|---|---|---|---|---|---|---|---|---|
| 25 | Loss | 23–1–1 | Brandon Figueroa | TKO | 12 (12), 0:32 | 7 Feb 2026 | M&S Bank Arena, Liverpool, England | Lost WBA featherweight title |
| 24 | Win | 23–0–1 | Sam Goodman | UD | 12 | 16 Aug 2025 | anb Arena, Riyadh, Saudi Arabia | Retained WBA featherweight title |
| 23 | Win | 22–0–1 | TJ Doheny | RTD | 10 (12), 3:00 | 15 Mar 2025 | M&S Bank Arena, Liverpool, England | Retained WBA featherweight title |
| 22 | Win | 21–0–1 | Ronny Rios | TKO | 10 (12), 2:06 | 5 Oct 2024 | M&S Bank Arena, Liverpool, England | Retained WBA featherweight title |
| 21 | Win | 20–0–1 | Raymond Ford | SD | 12 | 1 Jun 2024 | Kingdom Arena, Riyadh, Saudi Arabia | Won WBA featherweight title |
| 20 | Draw | 19–0–1 | Rey Vargas | SD | 12 | 8 Mar 2024 | Kingdom Arena, Riyadh, Saudi Arabia | For WBC featherweight title |
| 19 | Win | 19–0 | Isaac Dogboe | UD | 12 | 18 Nov 2023 | Manchester Arena, Manchester, England | Retained WBC Silver featherweight title |
| 18 | Win | 18–0 | Ludumo Lamati | TKO | 12 (12), 2:15 | 27 May 2023 | SSE Arena, Belfast, Northern Ireland | Retained WBC Silver featherweight title |
| 17 | Win | 17–0 | Jesus Ramirez Rubio | TKO | 1 (12), 1:48 | 11 Nov 2022 | York Hall, London, England | Retained WBC Silver featherweight title |
| 16 | Win | 16–0 | Nathanael Kakololo | TKO | 12 (12), 1:27 | 16 Jul 2022 | Copper Box Arena, London, England | Retained WBC Silver featherweight title |
| 15 | Win | 15–0 | Isaac Lowe | TKO | 6 (12), 1:45 | 23 Apr 2022 | Wembley Stadium, London, England | Won vacant WBC Silver featherweight title |
| 14 | Win | 14–0 | Piotr Gudel | TKO | 1 (8), 0:36 | 9 Oct 2021 | Utilita Arena, Birmingham, England | |
| 13 | Win | 13–0 | Jerome Campbell | PTS | 8 | 31 Jul 2020 | BT Sport Studio, London, England | |
| 12 | Win | 12–0 | Ivan Godor | RTD | 1 (6), 3:00 | 28 Feb 2020 | Grand Central Hall, Liverpool, England | |
| 11 | Win | 11–0 | Johnson Tellez | TKO | 2 (4), 2:45 | 18 Nov 2019 | Hilton Hotel, London, England | |
| 10 | Win | 10–0 | Abdon Cesar | PTS | 6 | 21 Sep 2019 | Greenbank Sports Academy, Liverpool, England | |
| 9 | Win | 9–0 | Michael Isaac Carrero | TKO | 3 (6), 0:43 | 4 May 2019 | Greenbank Sports Academy, Liverpool, England | |
| 8 | Win | 8–0 | Reynaldo Cajina | KO | 2 (4), 1:37 | 2 Mar 2019 | Greenbank Sports Academy, Liverpool, England | |
| 7 | Win | 7–0 | Joe Ducker | TKO | 2 (6), 1:55 | 27 Nov 2018 | Grand Central Hall, Liverpool, England | |
| 6 | Win | 6–0 | Brian Phillips | TKO | 2 (8), 2:30 | 21 Jul 2018 | Greenbank Sports Academy, Liverpool, England | |
| 5 | Win | 5–0 | Innocent Anyanwu | PTS | 4 | 2 Mar 2018 | Bowlers Exhibition Centre, Manchester, England | |
| 4 | Win | 4–0 | Antonio Horvatic | PTS | 4 | 4 Nov 2017 | Bowlers Exhibition Centre, Manchester, England | |
| 3 | Win | 3–0 | Luke Fash | PTS | 4 | 29 Sep 2017 | Bowlers Exhibition Centre, Manchester, England | |
| 2 | Win | 2–0 | Jamie Quinn | PTS | 4 | 29 Jul 2017 | Bowlers Exhibition Centre, Manchester, England | |
| 1 | Win | 1–0 | Dmitrijs Gutmans | PTS | 4 | 30 Jun 2017 | Fusion Nightclub, Liverpool, England | |

== See also ==
- List of British world boxing champions
- List of world featherweight boxing champions

Sporting positions
Regional boxing titles
| Vacant Title last held by Lerato Dlamini | WBC Silver featherweight champion April 23, 2022 – 2024; Vacated | Vacant Title next held by Ruben Villa |
World boxing titles
| Preceded by Raymond Ford | WBA featherweight champion 1 June 2024 – 7 February 2026 | Succeeded by Brandon Figueroa |
