= Raymond Ford =

American boxer (born 1999)

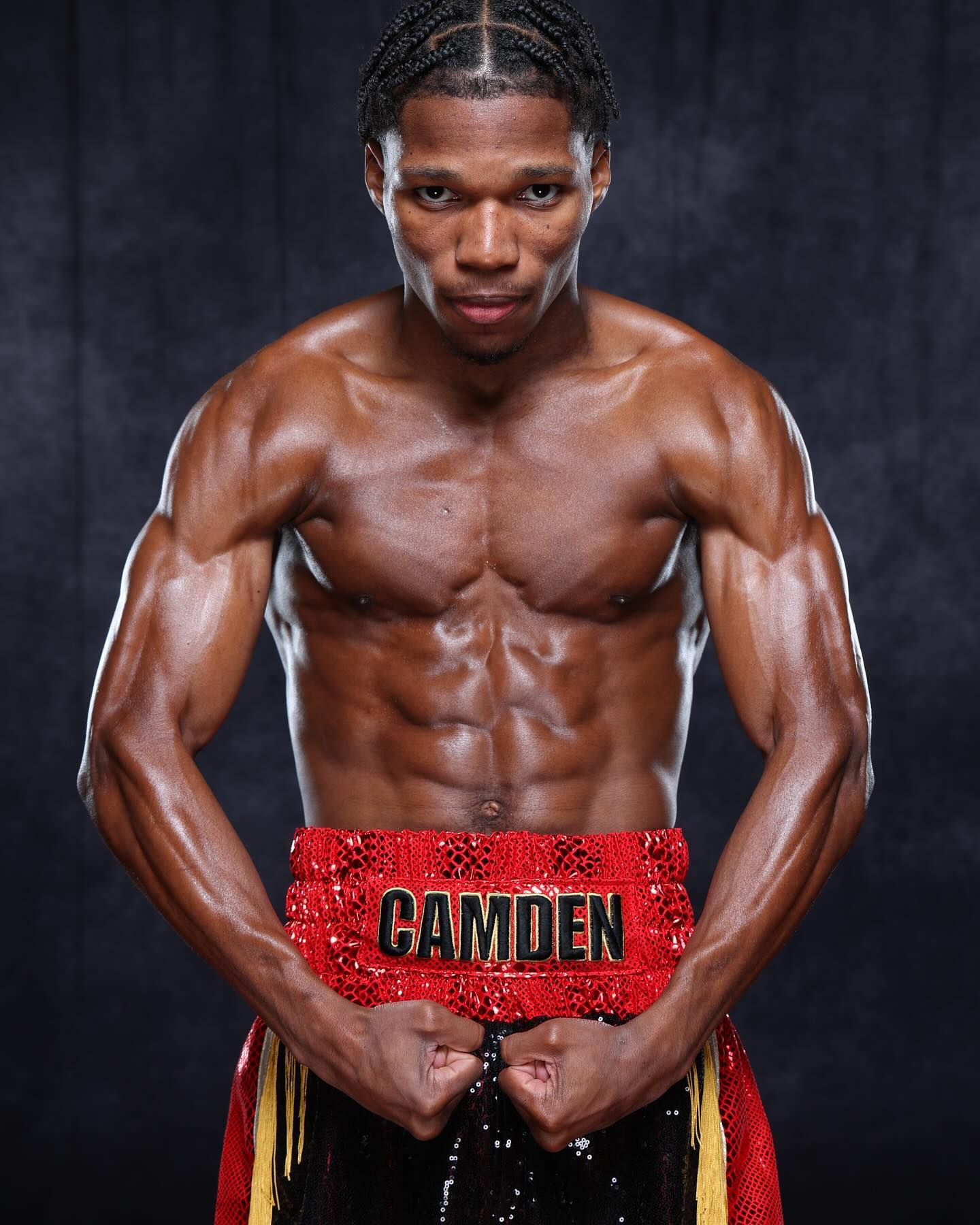

Personal information
- Nickname: Savage
- Born: March 16, 1999 (age 27) Camden, New Jersey, U.S.
- Height: 5 ft 6 in (168 cm)
- Weight: Featherweight; Super featherweight

Boxing career
- Reach: 69 in (175 cm)
- Stance: Southpaw

Boxing record
- Total fights: 21
- Wins: 18
- Win by KO: 8
- Losses: 2
- Draws: 1
Medal record
Men's amateur boxing
Golden Gloves
| Gold medal – first place | 2018 Ralston | Bantamweight |
National Championships
| Silver medal – second place | 2017 Salt Lake City | Super Bantamweight |
| Silver medal – second place | 2018 Salt Lake City | Super Bantamweight |

Raymond Ford (born March 16, 1999) is an American professional boxer. He held the World Boxing Association (WBA) featherweight title in 2024. As an amateur, he won the 2018 U.S. National Golden Gloves Championships.

== Professional career ==
Ford made his professional debut on March 15, 2019, scoring a four-round unanimous decision (UD) victory over Weusi Johnson at the Liacouras Center in Philadelphia, Pennsylvania. The fight was part of the undercard for Tevin Farmer's world title defense against Jono Carroll. He had four more wins in 2019; a four-round points decision (PTS) over Aleksandrs Birkenbergs in May; a first-round knockout (KO) over Isidro Figueroa in June; and a four-round UD over Rafael Castillo in September. Ford closed out 2019 with a first-round technical knockout of Francisco Muro on December 20, 2019.

Ford began his 2020 campaign by facing Eric Manriquez on August 15, 2020. He won the fight by unanimous decision. Ford next faced Rafael Reyes on November 7, 2020. He won the fight by a third-round technical knockout. Ford fought Juan Antonio López on December 19, 2020, in his final fight of the year. He won the bout by a seventh-round knockout.

Ford was booked to face the undefeated Aaron Perez on March 13, 2021, on the undercard of the Juan Francisco Estrada-Roman Gonzalez rematch. The fight ended in a split draw. One judge scored the fight 77–75 for Ford, the second judge scored it 78–74 for Perez, while the last judge scored the bout as even 76–76 draw. Ford was displeased with his performance, and asked for a rematch on his Instagram page, writing: "I definitely want a rematch to clean this up and show everyone I’m a better fighter than how I performed".

Ford was scheduled to fight Reece Bellotti for the vacant WBA Continental featherweight title on August 14, 2021. The fight was Ford's first fight outside of the United States, as it took place at the Matchroom Headquarters in Brentwood, England. He won the fight by a third-round technical knockout. Ford made his first title defense against Felix Caraballo on November 27, 2021. He retained the title with an eight-round technical knockout of Caraballo. Ford was scheduled to make his second title defense against the undefeated Edward Vazquez on February 5, 2022. Ford won the fight by controversial split decision. Two of the judges scored the fight 98–92 and 97–93 in his favor, while the third judge scored the bout 96–94 for Vazquez.

Ford was booked to make his first Continental Americas title defense in a regional title unification bout with the undefeated IBF North American featherweight titlist Richard Medina on June 25, 2022. He won the fight by unanimous decision, with two scorecards of 100–90 and one scorecard of 99–91. Ford made his second WBA Continental Americas featherweight title defense against Sakaria Lukas on November 12, 2022. He won the fight by an eight-round knockout.

Ford faced the former WBO junior featherweight champion Jessie Magdaleno on April 8, 2023. He won the first twelve round bout of his career by unanimous decision, with two scorecards of 119–107 and one scorecard of 116–110.

=== WBA featherweight champion ===
==== Ford vs. Kholmatov ====
Ford was scheduled to face Otabek Kholmatov for the vacant WBA featherweight title in Verona, New York. He won the fight by TKO in the 12th round with only 7 seconds left in the round. Afterwards, it was revealed that during the fight Kholmatov had suffered an ACL tear.

==== Ford vs. Ball ====
Ford was scheduled to make the first defense of his WBA featherweight title against Nick Ball on June 1, 2024 in Riyadh, Saudi Arabia. Ford lost the fight by split decision.

=== Super Featherweight ===
==== Ford vs. Gonzalez ====
Making his super featherweight debut, Ford defeated Orlando Gonzalez by unanimous decision, scoring two knockdowns during the fight, at Wells Fargo Center in Philadelphia, PA on November 9, 2024.

==== Ford vs. Mattice ====
Ford was scheduled to face Thomas Mattice for the WBA Continental North America super featherweight title at Boardwalk Hall in Atlantic City, New Jersey on April 12, 2025. Ford won the fight by unanimous decision, with 3 scorecards of 100–90.

==== Ford vs. Nova ====
On 16 August 2025, Ford defeated Abraham Nova by unanimous decision in Riyadh, Saudi Arabia, on the undercard of the Moses Itauma vs Dillian Whyte fight.

==== Ford vs. Foster ====
Ford challenged WBC super-featherweight champion O'Shaquie Foster at the Fertitta Center in Houston, Texas on 30 May 2026. He lost by majority decision with two of the ringside judges scoring the fight 118–110 and 116–112 in Foster's favour, while the third had it a 114–114 draw.

== Professional boxing record ==
| 21 fights | 18 wins | 2 losses |
|---|---|---|
| By knockout | 8 | 0 |
| By decision | 10 | 2 |
| Draws | 1 | |

| No. | Result | Record | Opponent | Type | Round, time | Date | Location | Notes |
|---|---|---|---|---|---|---|---|---|
| 21 | Loss | 18–2–1 | O'Shaquie Foster | MD | 12 | May 30, 2026 | Fertitta Center, Houston, Texas U.S. | For WBC super featherweight title |
| 20 | Win | 18–1–1 | Abraham Nova | UD | 10 | Aug 16, 2025 | anb Arena, Riyadh, Saudi Arabia | |
| 19 | Win | 17–1–1 | Thomas Mattice | UD | 10 | Apr 12, 2025 | Boardwalk Hall, Atlantic City, New Jersey, U.S. | Won WBA Continental North America super featherweight title |
| 18 | Win | 16–1–1 | Orlando González | UD | 10 | Nov 9, 2024 | Wells Fargo Center, Philadelphia, Pennsylvania, U.S. | |
| 17 | Loss | 15–1–1 | Nick Ball | SD | 12 | Jun 1, 2024 | Kingdom Arena, Riyadh, Saudi Arabia | Lost WBA featherweight title |
| 16 | Win | 15–0–1 | Otabek Kholmatov | TKO | 12 (12), 2:53 | Mar 2, 2024 | Turning Stone Resort Casino, Verona, New York, U.S. | Won vacant WBA featherweight title |
| 15 | Win | 14–0–1 | Jessie Magdaleno | UD | 12 | Apr 8, 2023 | Boeing Center at Tech Port, San Antonio, Texas, U.S. | |
| 14 | Win | 13–0–1 | Sakaria Lukas | KO | 8 (10), 2:20 | Nov 12, 2022 | Rocket Mortgage FieldHouse, Cleveland, Ohio, U.S. | |
| 13 | Win | 12–0–1 | Richard Medina | UD | 10 | Jun 25, 2022 | Tech Port Arena, San Antonio, Texas, U.S. | Won vacant IBF North American featherweight title |
| 12 | Win | 11–0–1 | Edward Vazquez | SD | 10 | Feb 5, 2022 | Footprint Center, Phoenix, Arizona, U.S. | |
| 11 | Win | 10–0–1 | Felix Caraballo | TKO | 8 (10), 2:10 | Nov 27, 2021 | Hulu Theater, New York City, New York, U.S. | |
| 10 | Win | 9–0–1 | Reece Bellotti | TKO | 3 (10) 0:39 | Aug 14, 2021 | Matchroom Headquarters, Brentwood, England | |
| 9 | Draw | 8–0–1 | Aaron Perez | SD | 8 | Mar 13, 2021 | American Airlines Center, Dallas, Texas, U.S. | |
| 8 | Win | 8–0 | Juan Antonio López | KO | 7 (8), 1:29 | Dec 19, 2020 | Alamodome, San Antonio, Texas, U.S. | |
| 7 | Win | 7–0 | Rafael Reyes | TKO | 3 (6), 1:26 | Nov 7, 2020 | Seminole Hard Rock Hotel & Casino, Hollywood, Florida, U.S. | |
| 6 | Win | 6–0 | Eric Manriquez | UD | 6 | Aug 15, 2020 | Downtown Streets, Tulsa, Oklahoma, U.S. | |
| 5 | Win | 5–0 | Francisco Muro | TKO | 1 (6), 1:41 | Dec 20, 2019 | Talking Stick Resort Arena, Phoenix, Arizona, U.S. | |
| 4 | Win | 4–0 | Rafael Castillo | UD | 4 | Sep 13, 2019 | Hulu Theater, New York City, New York, U.S. | |
| 3 | Win | 3–0 | Isidro Figueroa | KO | 1 (4), 1:28 | Jun 29, 2019 | Dunkin' Donuts Center, Providence, Rhode Island, U.S. | |
| 2 | Win | 2–0 | Aleksandrs Berkensbergs | PTS | 4 | May 10, 2019 | Nottingham Arena, Nottingham, England | |
| 1 | Win | 1–0 | Weusi Johnson | UD | 4 | Mar 15, 2019 | Liacouras Center, Philadelphia, Pennsylvania, U.S. | |

== See also ==
- List of southpaw stance boxers
- List of world featherweight boxing champions

Sporting positions
Amateur boxing titles
| Previous: Aaron Morales | Golden Gloves bantamweight champion 2018 | Next: Asa Stevens |
Regional boxing titles
| New title | IBF North American featherweight Champion; June 25, 2022 – 2022; Vacated | Vacant |
World boxing titles
| Vacant Title last held by Leigh Wood | WBA featherweight champion March 2, 2024 – June 1, 2024 | Succeeded by Nick Ball |
