= Mark Urvanov =

Russian boxer (born 1996)

Personal information
- Nickname: Canelo
- Nationality: Russian
- Born: Марк Дмитриевич Урванов; 12 May 1996 (age 30) Pervouralsk, Russia
- Height: 5 ft 7 in (170 cm)
- Weight: Featherweight; Super featherweight Super Lightweight; Welterweight; Super Welterweight

Boxing career
- Stance: Orthodox

Boxing record
- Total fights: 27
- Wins: 26
- Win by KO: 11
- Losses: 10
- Draws: 2

Mark Urvanov (born 12 May 1996) is a Russian professional boxer, who held the WBO International super featherweight title in 2019.

== Professional boxing career ==
Urvanov made his professional debut against Mikhail Alexeev on 24 April 2015. He lost the fight by unanimous decision. Urvanov amassed a 5–1 during the rest of the year, with three of those victories coming by way of stoppage. Urvanov won his first professional title, the Russian featherweight belt, with a ten-round unanimous decision of Alexey Shorokhov.

Urvanov won his next six fights, before being booked to face Muhammadkhuja Yaqubov for the vacant WBA Continental and IBF Baltic super featherweight titles on 10 February 2018. Yaqubov won the fight by unanimous decision. The judges scored the fight 117–110 for him, while the third judge scored it 116–111 in his favor.

Following the second loss of his professional career, Urvanov faced the journeyman Feruz Yuldoshev on 4 May 2018. He won the fight by unanimous decision, with scores of 77–75, 78–74 and 78–74. Urvanov was then booked to face Nikita Kuznetsov for the vacant WBC CISBB, IBF Youth and EBP super featherweight titles. The fight ended in a split draw.

Urvanov faced Jovylito Aligarbes on 10 November 2018. He won the fight by a third-round knockout. After a quick second-round technical knockout of the over-matched Pfariso Neluvhulani on 23 March 2019, Urvanov was booked to face Marco Demecillo on 13 July 2019. He won the fight by unanimous decision, with scores of 78–73, 78–73 and 77–74.

Urvanov was booked to face Evgeny Chuprakov for the vacant WBO International super featherweight title on 2 November 2019. He won the fight by a third-round technical knockout. Four months later, on 7 March 2020, Urvanov challenged the unbeaten WBA Gold super featherweight champion Akzhol Sulaimanbek Uulu. He won the fight by a seventh-round knockout.

Urvanov faced the journeyman Rofhiwa Maemu on 26 June 2021. He won the fight by unanimous decision, with all three judges scoring the fight 80–72 in his favor. Urvanov next faced the undefeated Oto Joseph on 11 September 2021. He won the fight by unanimous decision, with all three judges scoring the fight 100–90 in his favor.

Urvanov was booked to face Angel Rodriguez on 19 February 2022, on the undercard of the Zaur Abdullaev and Jorge Linares lightweight bout, in a WBA super featherweight title eliminator. He lost the fight by split decision. One judge scored the fight 115–113 in his favor, while the remaining two judges scored the bout 116–112 and 115–113 for Rodriguez.

Following his loss to Rodriguez, Urvanov was booked to face Dmitrii Khasiev on 23 July 2022. He won the fight by unanimous decision. Urvanov then faced the former super featherweight world titleholder René Alvarado on 19 November 2022. He won the fight by unanimous decision.

Urvanov faced the once-defeated Ruslan Kamilov on 7 March 2023. He won the fight by majority decision, with two judges scoring the bout 97–93 and 96–94 in his favor, while the third judge had it scored as an even 95–95 draw. Urvanov faced the unbeaten Murad Aliev on 22 July 2023. The fight ended in a majority decision draw.

== Professional boxing record ==
38 fights	26 wins	10 losses
By knockout	11	7
By decision	15	3
Draws	2	

No.	Result	Record	Opponent	Type	Round, time	Date	Location	Notes
38	Loss	26-10-2	Sergey Lipinets	TKO	3 (4), 1:44	Nov 6, 2026	Basket-Hall Arena, Kazan, Russia	
37	Loss	26-9-2	Bektas Kassenay	RTD	1 (8), 3:00	Oct 3, 2026	Osh Central Stadium, Osh, Kyrgyzstan	
36	Loss	26-8-2	Shohjahon Ergashev	KO	1 (10), 1:23	Jul 25, 2026	Humo Arena, Tashkent, Uzbekistan	
35	Loss	26-7-2	Neeraj Goyat	RTD	6 (10), 3:00	Jun 18, 2026	USC Soviet Wings, Moscow, Russia	
34	Loss	26-6-2	Vladislav Airiyan	TKO	2 (10), 2:50	Mar 29, 2026	Vladikavkaz, Russia	
33	Loss	26-5-2	Yuri Sakunts	TKO	1 (10), 1:18	Feb 7, 2026	World Siam Stadium, Bang Kapi, Bangkok, Thailand	
32	Win	26-4-2	Rustem Fatkhullin	UD	6	Dec 13, 2025	Veles Sports Complex, Kurgan, Russia	
31	Loss	25-4-2	Khurshidbek Rasuljonov	RTD	6 (8), 3:00	Jul 5, 2025	DIVS, Yekrateinburg	
30	Win	25-3-2	Rustem Fatkhullin	UD	6	Nov 30, 2024	RCC Boxing Academy, Yekaterinburg, Russia	
29	Win	24-3-2	Semour Isayev	KO	1 (8), 0:27	Sep 6, 2024	Traktor Sport Palace, Chelyabinsk, Russia	
28	Draw	23–3–2	Murad Aliev	MD	10	22 Jul 2023	RCC Boxing Academy, Yekaterinburg, Russia	
27	Win	23–3–1	Ruslan Kamilov	MD	10	7 Mar 2023	DIVS, Yekaterinburg, Russia	
26	Win	22–3–1	René Alvarado	UD	10	19 Nov 2022	RCC Boxing Academy, Yekaterinburg, Russia	
25	Win	21–3–1	Dmitrii Khasiev	UD	8	23 Jul 2022	RCC Boxing Academy, Yekaterinburg, Russia	
24	Loss	20–3–1	Angel Rodriguez	SD	12	19 Feb 2022	RCC Boxing Academy, Yekaterinburg, Russia	
23	Win	20–2–1	Oto Joseph	UD	10	11 Sep 2021	RCC Boxing Academy, Yekaterinburg, Russia	
22	Win	19–2–1	Rofhiwa Maemu	UD	8	26 Jun 2021	RCC Boxing Academy, Yekaterinburg, Russia	
21	Win	18–2–1	Akzhol Sulaimanbek Uulu	KO	7 (12), 1:33	7 Mar 2020	RCC Boxing Academy, Yekaterinburg, Russia	Won WBA Gold super featherweight title
20	Win	17–2–1	Evgeny Chuprakov	TKO	3 (10), 2:29	2 Nov 2019	RCC Boxing Academy, Yekaterinburg, Russia	Won vacant WBO International super featherweight title
19	Win	16–2–1	Marco Demecillo	UD	8	13 Jul 2019	RCC Boxing Academy, Yekaterinburg, Russia	
18	Win	15–2–1	Pfariso Neluvhulani	TKO	2 (8), 2:33	23 Mar 2019	RCC Boxing Academy, Yekaterinburg, Russia	
17	Win	14–2–1	Jovylito Aligarbes	KO	3 (8), 1:40	10 Nov 2018	RCC Boxing Academy, Yekaterinburg, Russia	
16	Draw	13–2–1	Nikita Kuznetsov	SD	10	7 Sep 2018	Traktor Sport Palace, Chelyabinsk, Russia	For vacant WBC CISBB, IBF Youth and EPB super featherweight titles
15	Win	13–2	Feruz Yuldoshev	UD	8	4 May 2018	RCC Boxing Academy, Yekaterinburg, Russia	
14	Loss	12–2	Muhammadkhuja Yaqubov	UD	12	10 Feb 2018	DIVS, Yekaterinburg, Russia	For vacant WBA Continental and IBF Baltic super featherweight titles
13	Win	12–1	Andrei Isayeu	SD	8	16 Sep 2017	Dom Pechati, Yekaterinburg, Russia	
12	Win	11–1	Jin Miura	SD	8	9 Jul 2017	DIVS, Yekaterinburg, Russia	Retained WBO Asia Pacific Youth featherweight title
11	Win	10–1	Glenn Enterina	UD	10	25 Mar 2017	PNTZ Palace of Culture, Pervouralsk, Russia	
10	Win	9–1	Aleksandr Saltykov	TKO	3 (6), 2:27	18 Feb 2017	Traktor Sport Palace, Chelyabinsk, Russia	
9	Win	8–1	Marvin Esquierdo	KO	6 (8), 1:53	18 Nov 2016	DIVS, Yekaterinburg, Russia	Won vacant WBO Asia Pacific Youth featherweight title
8	Win	7–1	Rauf Aghayev	TKO	10 (10), 2:43	17 Sep 2016	SKK im Blinova, Omsk, Russia	Won vacant WBC-ABC featherweight title
7	Win	6–1	Alexey Shorokhov	UD	10	27 Feb 2016	Arena, Yekaterinburg, Russia	Won vacant Russian featherweight title
6	Win	5–1	Musaib Asadov	UD	8	17 Dec 2015	Vodoley, Yekaterinburg, Russia	
5	Win	4–1	Beimbet Esov	TKO	1 (6), 1:39	13 Nov 2015	PNTZ Palace of Culture, Pervouralsk, Russia	
4	Win	3–1	Makhir Pashaev	UD	6	26 Sep 2015	Arena, Yekaterinburg, Russia	
3	Win	2–1	Sergey Sokolov	TKO	6 (6), 1:49	30 Jul 2015	Ambar, Tolyatti, Russia	
2	Win	1–1	Vladimir Antonyi	TKO	2 (4), 1:18	12 Jun 2015	Arena, Yekaterinburg, Russia	
1	Loss	0–1	Mikhail Alexeev	UD	4	24 Apr 2015	Vodoley, Yekaterinburg, Russia	
