= O'Shaquie Foster =

American boxer (born 1993)

- Foster in 2025

Personal information
- Nicknames: Ice Water; Shock
- Born: O'Shanique Dominique Williams Foster; September 17, 1993 (age 33) Orange, Texas, U.S.
- Height: 5 ft 8 in (173 cm)
- Weight: Super featherweight; Lightweight

Boxing career
- Reach: 72 in (183 cm)
- Stance: Orthodox

Boxing record
- Total fights: 29
- Wins: 26
- Win by KO: 12
- Losses: 3

O'Shaquie Dominique Williams Foster (/oʊˈʃɑːki/ oh-SHAH-ki; born September 17, 1993) is an American professional boxer. He is a two-time super featherweight champion, having held the unified World Boxing Council (WBC), International Boxing Federation (IBF), World Boxing Organization (WBO), and Ring magazine titles since October 2026. He also previously held the WBC interim lightweight title in 2025.

== Professional career ==
=== Early career ===
Foster made his professional debut against Theo Johnson on 8 September 2012. He won the fight by a first-round technical knockout. Foster amassed a 9–1 record during the next four years, before making his first step-up in competition. That step-up came against the undefeated Lavisas Williams on 19 February 2016, on the undercard of Showtime's "ShoBox: The Next Generation". Foster won the fight by a seventh-round technical knockout. He dropped Williams in rounds two, three, four and seven. Foster next faced Rolando Chinea on 22 July 2016. Chinea handed Foster his second professional loss, as he won the fight by split decision.

Foster bounced back from his second professional loss with a first-round technical knockout of Andrew Goodrich on 29 December 2017 and a majority decision win against Kaylyn Alfred on 20 January 2018, with both fights taking place at lightweight. Foster returned to super featherweight to face Frank De Alba on 13 April 2018. He won the eight round bout by majority decision. Two judges scored the fight 79–73 and 78–74 in his favor, while the third judge scored it as an even 76–76 draw.

=== Rise up the ranks ===
Foster was booked to face the unbeaten WBC Silver super featherweight champion Jon Fernandez, in the main event of the "ShoBox: The New Generation" series, which took place on 21 September 2018. He won the fight by unanimous decision, with all three judges scoring the fight 98–92 in his favor. Foster landed 145 total punches and 96 power punches over ten rounds, while Fernandez managed to land 102 total punches and 89 power punches.

Foster faced Fatiou Fassinou in a stay-busy fight on 23 February 2019. It was Foster's first fight near his native Orange County, as it took place in Beaumont, Texas. He won the fight by a third-round retirement, as Fassinou opted to remain in his corner after the third round ended. Foster was scheduled to fight Jesus Bravo for the vacant WBA Fedecentro super featherweight title on 17 July 2019, at the Gimnasio Nacional Eddy Cortés in San Juan, Puerto Rico. It was Foster's first fight outside of the United States. He won the fight by an eight-round knockout. Foster floored Bravo with a counter right straight at the 2:59 minute mark of the eight round, which prompted referee Ronald Alvarez to stop the fight with one second remaining in the round.

Foster made his first WBC Silver title defense against Alberto Mercado on 5 December 2019, at the Terminal 5 in New York City. The fight was scheduled for the undercard of the UFC Fight Pass broadcast super lightweight title fight between Ana Laura Esteche and Mary McGee. He won the fight by unanimous decision. Two judges scored the fight 99–91 in his favor, while the third judge scored it 98–92 for Foster.

Foster made his second WBC Silver title defense against the veteran Miguel Román on 19 November 2020, after an eleven-month absence from the sport. The fight was scheduled as the main event of an NBCSN broadcast card, which took place at the Wild Card Boxing in Los Angeles, California. Some minor controversy occurred prior to the fight, as it was discovered by Foster's head coach Bobby Benton that the padding was removed from Roman's gloves. The state commission confiscated the gloves, and replaced them by a second pair. Foster won the fight by a ninth-round knockout, forcing a referee stoppage with a flurry of punches at the 0:58 minute mark. Roman was knocked down twice prior to the stoppage. Foster first knocked him down with a right straight midway through the opening round, while the second knockdown was the result of a left hand early in the ninth round.

Foster was scheduled to face the #2 ranked WBC super featherweight contender Muhammadkhuja Yaqubov in a WBC title eliminator on 18 March 2022, on the undercard of the Estelle Yoka Mossely and Yanina del Carmen Lescano IBO title bout. He won the fight by unanimous decision, with scores of 118–109, 117–110 and 117–110. Foster scored the only knockdown of the fight in the twelfth round, dropping Yaqubov with a left overhand.

=== WBC super featherweight champion ===
==== Foster vs. Vargas ====
Foster was booked to face the reigning WBC featherweight champion Rey Vargas for the vacant WBC super featherweight title, on 11 February 2023, at the Alamodome in San Antonio, Texas. The sanctioning body permitted Vargas to challenge for the vacant championship, while holding a belt a weight class lower, following the breakdown of his negotiations with the WBA featherweight titleholder Léo Santa Cruz. Despite entering the bout as a slight underdog, Foster was able to win the fight by unanimous decision, with scores of 116–112, 117–111 and 119–109. Foster landed 144 total and 87 power punches throughout the twelve round contest, compared to the 101 total and 66 power punches from Vargas.

==== Foster vs. Hernandez ====
During the annual WBC convention, held on November 9, 2022, the sanctioning body ordered the winner of the vacant championship bout between Foster and Rey Vargas to make two mandatory title defenses: first against the once-defeated Eduardo Hernandez and the second against the winner of the Muhammadkhuja Yaqubov and Robson Conceição title eliminator. As Foster failed to reach an agreement with Hernandez, a purse bid was called for August 8, 2023. The promotional rights were secured by Matchroom Boxing, who put in a winning bid of $466,666. The fight took place on October 28, 2023, in Hernandez's home country of Mexico. Though the fight seemed competitive through the first 10 rounds, Foster was behind on two of the three judges scorecards. The eleventh round was a round of the year contender, Foster rocked Hernandez early but Hernandez battle back and hurt Foster in turn. In the twelfth and final round Foster finally took over, dropping Hernandez twice and defending his title via TKO.

==== Foster vs. Nova ====
On February 16, 2024, Foster was scheduled to make the second defense of his title against Abraham Nova at The Theater at Madison Square Garden in New York. He won the fight by split decision.

==== Foster vs. Conceicao ====
Foster was scheduled to make the third defense of his WBC super featherweight title against Robson Conceicao at Prudential Center in Newark, New Jersey on July 6, 2024. Foster lost the fight by controversial split decision.

==== Foster vs. Conceicao 2 ====
On August 29, 2024 it was reported that Foster would challenge Robson Conceição for his WBC super featherweight title in a championship rematch on November 2, 2024 in Verona, New York. On September 9, 2024 the fight was confirmed to take place at Turning Stone Resort Casino in Verona, NY. Foster won by split decision.

==== Foster vs. Fulton ====
In late August 2025, it was reported that Foster would defend his WBC super featherweight title against Stephen Fulton at MGM Grand Garden Arena in Las Vegas on December 6, 2025. However, because Fulton weighed in two pounds over the super featherweight limit at 132lbs, the bout was changed to the WBC interim lightweight championship title fight. Foster won the fight by unanimous decision.

==== Foster vs. Ford ====
Foster was scheduled to make the first defense of his WBC super featherweight title in his second reign against Raymond Ford at the Fertitta Center in Houston, Texas, on May 30, 2026. He won by majority decision with two of the ringside judges scoring the fight 118–110 and 116–112 in his favour, while the third had it a 114–114 draw.

==== Foster vs Navarrete ====
On August 16, 2026, DAZN's Chris Mannix reported that Foster would face reigning World Boxing Organisation (WBO) and International Boxing Federation (IBF) super featherweight champion, Emanuel Navarrete in a unification bout. . The fight would be officially announced on September 2, 2026, set for the 24th of October 2026 at the Frost Bank Center in San Antonio, Texas. As Navarrete was ranked No. 1 by the Ring Magazine and Foster was ranked No. 2, the Ring Magazine super featherweight title was also on the line. Foster would put on a dominant performance, knocking down Navarette twice in the 12th round. One judge scored the fight 115-111, the other two scored it 118-108 all in Foster's favour. After the fight, O'Shaquie Foster expressed interest in going undisputed at super-featherweight.

== Awards ==
Foster was named Fighter of the Year at the 2023 and 2024 Houston Boxing Awards.

== Professional boxing record ==
29 fights	26 wins	3 losses
By knockout	12	0
By decision	14	3

No.	Result	Record	Opponent	Type	Round, time	Date	Location	Notes
29	Win	26–3	Emanuel Navarrete	UD	12	24 Oct 2026	Frost Bank Center, San Antonio, Texas, U.S.	Retained WBC super featherweight title; Won IBF, WBO, and vacant The Ring super featherweight titles
28	Win	25–3	Raymond Ford	MD	12	30 May 2026	Fertitta Center, Houston, Texas, U.S.	Retained WBC super featherweight title
27	Win	24–3	Stephen Fulton	UD	12	6 Dec 2025	Frost Bank Center, San Antonio, Texas, U.S.	Won vacant WBC interim lightweight title; WBC super featherweight title not at stake as Fulton misses weight
26	Win	23–3	Robson Conceição	SD	12	2 Nov 2024	Turning Stone Resort & Casino, Verona, New York, U.S.	Won WBC super featherweight title
25	Loss	22–3	Robson Conceição	SD	12	6 Jul 2024	Prudential Center, Newark, New Jersey, U.S.	Lost WBC super featherweight title
24	Win	22–2	Abraham Nova	SD	12	16 Feb 2024	The Theater at Madison Square Garden, New York City, New York, U.S.	Retained WBC super featherweight title
23	Win	21–2	Eduardo Hernández	TKO	12 (12), 2:38	28 Oct 2023	Polifórum Benito Juárez, Cancún, Mexico	Retained WBC super featherweight title
22	Win	20–2	Rey Vargas	UD	12	11 Feb 2023	Alamodome, San Antonio, Texas, U.S.	Won vacant WBC super featherweight title
21	Win	19–2	Muhammadkhuja Yaqubov	UD	12	18 Mar 2022	Aviation Club Tennis Centre, Dubai, United Arab Emirates	Retained WBC Silver super featherweight title
20	Win	18–2	Miguel Román	KO	9 (10), 0:58	19 Nov 2020	Wild Card Boxing, Los Angeles, California, U.S.	Retained WBC Silver super featherweight title
19	Win	17–2	Alberto Mercado	UD	10	5 Dec 2019	Terminal 5, New York City, New York, U.S.	Retained WBC Silver super featherweight title
18	Win	16–2	Jesus Bravo	KO	8 (10), 2:59	17 Jul 2019	Gimnasio Nacional Eddy Cortés, San José, Costa Rica	Won vacant WBA Fedecentro super featherweight title
17	Win	15–2	Fatiou Fassinou	RTD	3 (10), 3:00	23 Feb 2019	Beaumont Civic Center, Beaumont, Texas, U.S.	
16	Win	14–2	Jon Fernandez	UD	10	21 Sep 2018	Firelake Arena, Shawnee, Oklahoma, U.S.	Won WBC Silver super featherweight title
15	Win	13–2	Frank De Alba	MD	8	13 Apr 2018	Sands Bethlehem Event Center, Bethlehem, Pennsylvania, U.S.	
14	Win	12–2	Kaylyn Alfred	MD	4	20 Jan 2018	Arabia Shrine Center, Houston, U.S.	
13	Win	11–2	Andrew Goodrich	TKO	1 (4), 2:41	29 Dec 2017	Rapides Coliseum, Alexandria, Louisiana, U.S.	
12	Loss	10–2	Rolando Chinea	SD	8	22 Jul 2016	Foxwoods Resort, Mashantucket, Connecticut, U.S.	
11	Win	10–1	Lavisas Williams	TKO	7 (8), 0:52	19 Feb 2016	Boardwalk Hall, Atlantic City, New Jersey U.S.	
10	Win	9–1	Rynell Griffin	TKO	4 (6), 2:13	16 Jan 2016	ABC Sports Complex, Springfield, Missouri, U.S.	
9	Loss	8–1	Samuel Teah	UD	8	6 Nov 2015	The D Hotel & Casino, Las Vegas, Nevada, U.S.	
8	Win	8–0	Darius Jackson	KO	1 (4), 1:03	26 Sep 2015	Veteran's Memorial Park, Beach Haven, New Jersey, U.S.	
7	Win	7–0	Frank Jordan	KO	1 (4), 1:26	22 Aug 2015	North Hall at Eastern Market, Washington, D.C., U.S.	
6	Win	6–0	Devin Parker	UD	4	12 Jul 2014	Evangeline Downs Casino, Opelousas, U.S.	
5	Win	5–0	Mario Lacey	TKO	2 (6), 1:03	10 May 2014	Evangeline Downs Casino, Opelousas, Louisiana, U.S.	
4	Win	4–0	Aaron Anderson	UD	4	2 Nov 2013	H & PE Arena, Houston, Texas, U.S.	
3	Win	3–0	Stephan Nava	KO	1 (4), 0:36	26 Oct 2012	Casa de Amistad, Harlingen, Texas, U.S.	
2	Win	2–0	Manuel Rubalcava	UD	4	22 Sep 2012	Civic Center, Cleveland, Ohio, U.S.	
1	Win	1–0	Theo Johnson	TKO	1 (4), 0:12	8 Sep 2012	Richard M. Borchard Regional Fairgrounds, Robstown, Texas, U.S.	Held record for fastest KO for professional debut

== See also ==
- List of world super-featherweight boxing champions

Sporting positions
Regional boxing titles
Vacant Title last held by Eric Walters	WBA Fedecentro super featherweight champion July 17, 2019 – 2021; Vacated	Vacant Title next held by George Acosta
Preceded by Jon Fernandez	WBC silver super featherweight champion September 21, 2018 – February 11, 2023; Won world title	Vacant Title next held by Michael Magnesi
World boxing titles
Vacant Title last held by Shakur Stevenson	WBC super featherweight champion February 11, 2023 – July 6, 2024	Succeeded by Robson Conceição
Preceded by Robson Conceiçāo	WBC super featherweight champion November 2, 2024 – present	Incumbent
Vacant Title last held by Joseph Diaz	WBC lightweight champion Interim title December 6 – December 12, 2025; Vacated	Vacant Title next held by Jadier Herrera
Preceded by Emanuel Navarrete	WBO super featherweight champion 24 October 2026 – present	Incumbent
Preceded by Emanuel Navarrete	IBF super featherweight champion 24 October 2026 – present	Incumbent
Vacant Title last held by Shakur Stevenson	The Ring super featherweight champion 24 October 2026 – present	Incumbent
Awards
Previous: Sebastian Fundora vs. Erickson Lubin; Round 7	The Ring Round of the Year vs. Eduardo Hernández; Round 11; 2023	Incumbent
