= Miguel Cotto vs. Yoshihiro Kamegai =

Boxing match

- Date: August 26, 2017
- Venue: StubHub Center, Carson, California, U.S.
- Title(s) on the line: vacant WBO light middleweight title

Tale of the tape
Boxer	Miguel Cotto	Yoshihiro Kamegai
Nickname	Junito	Maestrito ("Maestro")
Hometown	Caguas, Puerto Rico	Sapporo, Hokkaido, Japan
Purse	$750,000	$192,000
Pre-fight record	40–5 (33 KO)	27–3–2 (24 KO)
Age	36 years, 9 months	34 years, 9 months
Height	5 ft 8 in (173 cm)	5 ft 9 in (175 cm)
Weight	153.6 lb (70 kg)	153.8 lb (70 kg)
Style	Orthodox	Orthodox
Recognition	WBO; No. 1 Ranked Light Middleweight; The Ring; No. 3 Ranked Light middleweight 4-division world champion	WBO; No. 6 Ranked Light Middleweight

Result
- Cotto wins via 12–round unanimous decision (120–108, 119–109, 118–110)

Miguel Cotto vs. Yoshihiro Kamegai was a professional boxing match contested on August 26, 2017, for the vacant WBO light middleweight title.

== Background ==
Following a November 2015 loss to Canelo Álvarez, four-division world champion Miguel Cotto had been inactive after several efforts to get back in the ring had fallen through. First, Cotto and his team had engaged in talks with fellow four-division world champion Juan Manuel Márquez, who had been on hiatus for nearly two years. The Cotto–Márquez fight had nearly been agreed to when negotiations fell apart due to both parties disagreeing on which weight to fight at; the smaller Márquez was willing to come up to the 147–pound welterweight limit, while Cotto, who had not fought as a welterweight since 2009 and had been fighting in either the 154–pound light middleweight or 160–pound middleweight divisions since, insisted on 150–pound catchweight between the welterweight and light middleweight divisions, which Márquez refused, causing the fight's cancellation. After ending talks with Márquez, Cotto still had tentative plans to return to the ring that fall with Michael Yormark of Roc Nation, who promoted Cotto, claiming that they were "hopeful" to make an announcement on a possible opponent "over the next couple of weeks." However, in October, after talks with former IBF light welterweight champion Lamont Peterson broke down, it was announced that Cotto would not fight at all in 2016. In December, Cotto reached an agreement to face James Kirkland February 25, 2017, seemingly ending his 15–month layoff. However, this fight too was derailed when Kirkland suffered a broken nose during a sparring session at his training camp in early February.

Cotto then reached an agreement with little known Japanese fighter Yoshihiro Kamegai to fight for the vacant WBO light middleweight title. This fight was temporarily put in jeopardy when Roc Nation refused to meet Cotto's purse demands as they feared that the fight would lose money with Cotto taking on a rather obscure fighter. This would lead to Cotto and Roc Nation parting ways and Cotto instead signing a deal with Golden Boy Promotions. With Golden Boy at the helm, the Cotto–Kamegai fight was made official in late May to take place that August in California's StubHub Center.

== Fight Details ==
Cotto would cruise to a lopsided unanimous decision, winning every round on judge Robin Taylor's scorecard (120–108) while only losing three rounds combined on the other two (119–109 and 118–110). Cotto landed punches almost at will, tying a career high with 251 power punches landed and landing 40% of his total punches, which equated to 339 out of a career high 839 thrown punches. Though Kamegai was unable to sustain much offense, he showed remarkable durability as, despite being hammered by Cotto's power punches all throughout the fight, he continued to press forward and never appeared to be in danger of getting knocked down.

== Fight card ==
Confirmed bouts:

Weight Class	Weight		vs.		Method	Round	Time	Notes
Light Middleweight	154 lbs.	Miguel Cotto	def.	Yoshihiro Kamegai	UD	12		^{note 1}
Super Bantamweight	122 lbs.	Rey Vargas	def.	Ronny Rios	UD	12		^{note 2}
Preliminary Card
Featherweight	126 lbs.	Joet Gonzalez	def.	Deivi Julio	KO	5/10	2:57
Super Bantamweight	122 lbs.	Emilio Sanchez	def.	Danny Flores	KO	5/8	0:55
Mini Flyweight	105 lbs.	Janiel Rivera	def.	Marco Antonio Sanchez	KO	1/8	1:59
Light Welterweight	140 lbs.	Genaro Gamez	def.	Eduardo Rafael Reyes	UD	6
Light Middleweight	154 lbs.	Alexis Rocha	def.	Esau Herrera de la Cruz	KO	1/6	2:59
Featherweight	126 lbs.	Tenochtitlan Nava	def.	Angel Enrique Aguilar Jimenez	UD	4
Light Welterweight	140 lbs.	Ruben Rodriguez	def.	Rolando Padilla	KO	2/4	0:47
Super Bantamweight	122 lbs.	Javier Padilla	D	Ricardo Arias	UD	4

^Note 1 For Vacant WBO light middleweight title
^Note 2 For WBC Super Bantamweight title

== Broadcasting ==
Country	Broadcaster
Latin America	Space
Panama	RPC
United Kingdom	BoxNation
United States	HBO

Preceded by vs. Canelo Álvarez	Miguel Cotto's bouts 26 August 2017	Succeeded by vs. Sadam Ali
Preceded by vs. Jesus Soto Karass	Yoshihiro Kamegai's bouts 26 August 2017	Succeeded by vs. Greg Vendetti
