= Oto Joseph =

Nigerian boxer (born 1992)

Personal information
- Nickname: Joe Boy
- Nationality: Nigerian
- Born: November 25, 1992 (age 33) Akwa Ibom State, Nigeria
- Height: 5 ft 4 in (1.63 m)
- Weight: Lightweight

Boxing career

Boxing record
- Total fights: 21
- Wins: 19
- Win by KO: 12
- Losses: 2

Oto Joseph (born November 25, 1992) is a Nigerian professional boxer who held the African lightweight title from two times 2017 to 2020 and from 2022 till date

. As an amateur, he represented his country at the 2013 World Championships and 2014 Commonwealth Games.

== Early years ==
In his youth, Joseph had an interest in both football and taekwondo. He then switched to boxing after watching his older brother train. Although his parents were originally against the decision, he won a gold medal at the National Sports Festival in 2012. He also represented his country at the 2013 World Amateur Championships and the 2014 Commonwealth Games.

== Professional career ==
Joseph made his professional debut on March 15, 2015, defeating Kehinde Bhadmus with a second-round technical knockout (TKO) in Lagos. After defeating compatriot Fatai Nurudeen in October, he beat him in a rematch five months later for the Nigerian lightweight title via unanimous decision (UD). This was the first time he headlined a professional card (GOtv Boxing Night 7). He also defeated Hogan Jimoh Jr., son of Nigerian boxing legend Hogan Jimoh, stopping him in the first round at GOtv Boxing Night 6.

He received a shot at the vacant WABU lightweight title on March 26, 2017, facing Ghanaian veteran Mettle Ayitey at the Indoor Sports Hall of Obafemi Awolowo Stadium in Ibadan. He defeated Ayitey with a first-round TKO in the main event of GOtv Boxing Night 11 for the title. Joseph was scheduled to face South African Dillon Youle for the inaugural Commonwealth Africa lightweight title, but Youle was replaced by undefeated Malawian prospect Israel Kammwamba due to injury. He defeated Kammwamba by unanimous decision at GOtv Boxing Night 12 in Lagos for his third title belt.

On December 26, 2017, Joseph stopped Egyptian fighter Ahmed Abdulrahim for the African lightweight title at GOtv Boxing Night 13 in Lagos. He became the first African lightweight champion from Nigeria since two-time Olympian Christopher Ossai was stripped of the title in 1993. In his first successful title defense, he defeated Ghanaian contender Nathanael Nukpe by unanimous decision seven months later at GOtv Boxing Night 15 in the Indoor Sports Hall of Adamasingba Stadium.

In his first fight of 2019 he defended his African crown against Success Tetteh at GOtv Boxing Night 18 in Ibadan on April 21. He dominated the Ghanaian challenger in a short fight; the referee stopped it in the second round in Joseph's favor after Tetteh was visibly struggling to keep his balance.

Joseph was set to defend the African title against WABU lightweight champion Rilwan Oladosu in Lagos on October 12 in a matchup tagged the "Fight of the Decade" in Nigeria, but Joseph had to pull out after sustaining a shoulder injury in training. The mandatory title defense was pushed back to December, but Joseph did not recover in time and was unable to fight Oladosu. In January 2020, the African Boxing Union (ABU) announced it had stripped him of his lightweight title belt due to his inability to defend it in the stipulated time frame. Joseph claimed to have never received any correspondence from the ABU concerning the decision.

== Professional boxing record ==
19 fights	18 wins	1 loss
By knockout	9	0
By decision	9	1

No.	Result	Record	Opponent	Type	Round, time	Date	Location	Notes
19	Win	18–1	(Ghana) Abdul Malik Jabir	RTD	1 (6), 3:00	Dec 24, 2021	Bukom Boxing Arena, Accra, Ghana	
18	Loss	17–1	(Russia) Mark Urvanov	UD	10	Sep 11, 2021	RCC Boxing Academy, Yekaterinburg, Russia	
17	Win	17–0	(Ghana) Anama Dotse	TKO	3 (10), 1:27	March 7, 2021	AMA Basketball Court, Accra, Ghana	
16	Win	16–0	(Nigeria) Tope Agboola	KO	3 (8), 2:15	July 21, 2019	National Stadium, Lagos, Nigeria	
15	Win	15–0	(Ghana) Success Tetteh	KO	2 (12), 0:32	April 21, 2019	Obafemi Awolowo Stadium, Ibadan, Nigeria	Retained African lightweight title
14	Win	14–0	(Nigeria) Hammed Ganiyu	UD	8	Dec 28, 2018	Tafawa Balewa Square, Lagos, Nigeria	
13	Win	13–0	(Ghana) Emmanuel Mensah	TKO	5 (10)	Oct 14, 2018	Teslim Balogun Stadium, Lagos, Nigeria	
12	Win	12–0	(Ghana) Nathanael Nukpe	UD	12	Jul 29, 2018	Adamasingba Stadium, Ibadan, Nigeria	Retained African lightweight title
11	Win	11–0	(Nigeria) Prince Nwoye	UD	10	Apr 14, 2018	National Stadium, Lagos, Nigeria	
10	Win	10–0	(Egypt) Ahmed Abdulrahim	TKO	5 (12)	Dec 26, 2017	Landmark Events Centre, Lagos, Nigeria	Won vacant African lightweight title
9	Win	9–0	(Malawi) Israel Kammwamba	UD	10	Oct 1, 2017	National Stadium, Lagos, Nigeria	Won inaugural Commonwealth Africa lightweight title
8	Win	8–0	(Ghana) Mettle Ayitey	KO	1 (12), 2:10	Mar 26, 2017	Obafemi Awolowo Stadium, Ibadan, Nigeria	Won vacant WABU lightweight title
7	Win	7–0	(Nigeria) Fatai Nurudeen	KO	4 (8)	Dec 26, 2016	National Stadium, Lagos, Nigeria	Retained Nigerian lightweight title
6	Win	6–0	(Ghana) Richard Amenfu	UD	8	Oct 2, 2016	National Stadium, Lagos, Nigeria	
5	Win	5–0	(Nigeria) Fatai Nurudeen	UD	12	May 1, 2016	National Stadium, Lagos, Nigeria	Won Nigerian lightweight title
4	Win	4–0	(Nigeria) Hogan Jimoh Jr.	TKO	1 (6)	Mar 25, 2016	National Stadium, Lagos, Nigeria	
3	Win	3–0	(Nigeria) Fatai Nurudeen	UD	8	Oct 25, 2015	National Stadium, Lagos, Nigeria	
2	Win	2–0	(Nigeria) Ola Adebakin	UD	6	Aug 23, 2015	The Elysium at Piccadilly Suites, Lagos, Nigeria	
1	Win	1–0	(Nigeria) Kehinde Bhadmus	TKO	2 (6)	Mar 15, 2015	National Stadium, Lagos, Nigeria	

Sporting positions
Regional boxing titles
Vacant Title last held by Lunga Stimela	African lightweight champion December 26, 2017 – January 2020; Stripped	Vacant
