= Miguel Cotto vs. Sadam Ali =

2017 boxing match

- Date: December 2, 2017
- Venue: Madison Square Garden, New York, New York, U.S.
- Title(s) on the line: WBO light middleweight title

Tale of the tape
Boxer	Miguel Cotto	Sadam Ali
Nickname	Junito	World Kid
Hometown	Caguas, Puerto Rico	Brooklyn, New York, U.S.
Purse	$750,000	$600,000
Pre-fight record	41–5 (33 KO)	25–1 (14 KO)
Age	37 years, 1 month	29 years, 2 months
Height	5 ft 8 in (173 cm)	5 ft 8 in (173 cm)
Weight	151.6 lb (69 kg)	153 lb (69 kg)
Style	Orthodox	Orthodox
Recognition	WBO; Light Middleweight Champion; The Ring; No. 3 Ranked Light middleweight 4-division world champion	WBO; No. 7 Ranked Light Middleweight

Result
- Ali wins via 12–round unanimous decision (116–112, 115–113, 115–113)

Miguel Cotto vs. Sadam Ali was a professional boxing match contested on December 2, 2017, for the WBO light middleweight title.

== Background ==
Just prior to his title fight against Yoshihiro Kamegai, 36-year old four-division world champion Miguel Cotto announced that he would fight only once more after facing Kamegai before retiring at the end of the year. Cotto reiterated his intent following his defeat of Kamegai, stating that although he did not have an opponent in mind yet, he wished to stage his last fight in Madison Square Garden, where he had fought nine prior times and sported a 8–1 record. Cotto's wishes were answered as it was announced in September that a December 2 date at the venue had been secured. Though an opponent had not been named, Cotto mentioned that he would like to meet the winner of the upcoming Canelo Álvarez–Gennady Golovkin fight, stating that fighting the winner "would be a good way to go out." However, the Álvarez–Golovkin fight ended in a draw, leaving both fighters unavailable to fight Cotto as they pursued an immediate rematch. Instead, it was announced that Cotto would face little-known New York native Sadam Ali, a former Olympian and welterweight title contender who would be making his light middleweight debut. Golden Boy Promotions president Eric Gomez mentioned that they had engaged in talks with bigger named fighters such as Errol Spence Jr., Danny Garcia and then-WBC lightweight champion Mikey Garcia, who was willing to jump up three weight classes to face Cotto, but all eventually declined.

Cotto was ranked as the 6th best Light middleweight by TBRB.

== Fight Details ==
Though he came into the fight as a considerable underdog, Ali managed to keep Cotto at bey in the early rounds with slick defense and counter-punching and came on strong in the latter rounds with efficient power-punching as he was able to score an upset unanimous decision victory with two scores of 115–113 and one score of 116–112. The fight was close as Cotto scored often with the jab (landing 55 to Ali's 17) and landed more overall punches (163 to Ali's 139) and held a two-point lead on two of the official scorecards, while the third scorecard was even going into the final four rounds. However, Cotto suffered a left bicep injury in the seventh round and although he was able to take the eighth round on all three scorecards, Ali was able to take advantage of the tiring and injured Cotto and was the busier fighter in the final four rounds as he pressed forward and landed numerous power punches to Cotto's face which began to swell from all the punishment Ali was able to land.

== Fight card ==
Confirmed bouts:

Weight Class	Weight		vs.		Method	Round
Light Middleweight	154 lbs.	Sadam Ali	def.	Miguel Cotto (c)	UD	12	^{note 1}
Super Bantamweight	122 lbs.	Rey Vargas (c)	def.	Oscar Negrete	UD	12	^{note 2}
Light Flyweight	108 lbs.	Ángel Acosta	def.	Juan Alejo	KO	10/12	^{note 3}
Featherweight	126 lbs.	Ronny Rios	def.	Deivi Julio Bassa	UD	10
Welterweight	147 lbs.	Zachary Ochoa	def.	Erick Martinez	UD	6

^Note 1 For WBO light middleweight title
^Note 2 For WBC super bantamweight title
^Note 3 For vacant WBO light flyweight title

== Broadcasting ==
Country	Broadcaster
United States	HBO

Preceded by vs. Yoshihiro Kamegai	Miguel Cotto's bouts 2 December 2017	Retired
Preceded by vs. Johan Pérez	Sadam Ali's bouts 2 December 2017	Succeeded by ~~vs. Liam Smith~~ vs. Jaime Munguía
