= Ronny Rios =

American boxer (born 1990)

Personal information
- Nationality: American
- Born: January 22, 1990 (age 36) Santa Ana, California, U.S.
- Height: 5 ft 7 1/2 in (171 cm)
- Weight: Super bantamweight; Featherweight

Boxing career
- Reach: 67 in (170 cm)
- Stance: Orthodox

Boxing record
- Total fights: 40
- Wins: 34
- Win by KO: 17
- Losses: 6

Ronny Rios (born January 22, 1990) is an American professional boxer.

== Amateur career ==
Rios was an amateur boxer. He went on to win a National Golden Gloves and two U.S. National Bantamweight Champions.

== Professional career ==
On February 4, 2012 Ronny knocked out the veteran Jeremy McLaurin at the Phoenix Club in Anaheim, California. On November 21, 2015 Ronny defeated Jayson Velez at the Mandalay Bay Arena in Las Vegas, Nevada to win the WBC Silver Featherweight Championship.

On July 13, 2019, Ronny Rios fought undefeated rising prospect Diego De La Hoya. After a slow start, both fighters let their hands go, and started landing on each other in the second round. In the fourth round, the fight slowed down again. In the sixth round, Rios dropped De La Hoya with a left hook and right uppercut combination. De La Hoya managed to get up, but immediately said something to the referee who decided to wave the fight off.

In his next fight, Rios defeated Hugo Berrio via a fourth-round knockout.

WBA ordered his next fight to be against Murodjon Akhmadaliev. Rios lost the fight by 12th round knockout.

Rios challenged WBA featherweight champion Nick Ball at the M&S Bank Arena in Liverpool, England, on 5 October 2024. He lost the fight by stoppage in the 10th round.

After almost 18 months away from the competitive boxing ring, he lost on his comeback to Bryan Acosta via unanimous decision at Thunder Studios in Long Beach, California, on 28 March 2026.

== Professional boxing record ==
40 fights	34 wins	6 losses
By knockout	17	4
By decision	17	2

No.	Result	Record	Opponent	Type	Round, time	Date	Location	Notes
40	Loss	34–6	Bryan Acosta	UD	10	28 Mar 2026	Thunder Studios, Long Beach, California, U.S.	
39	Loss	34–5	Nick Ball	TKO	10 (12), 2:06	5 Oct 2024	M&S Bank Arena, Liverpool, England	For the WBA featherweight title
38	Win	34–4	Nicolas Polanco	KO	5 (10), 0:54	Apr 24, 2024	ProBox TV Events Center, Plant City, Florida, U.S.	
37	Loss	33–4	Murodjon Akhmadaliev	TKO	12 (12), 2:06	Jun 25, 2022	Tech Port Arena, San Antonio, Texas, U.S.	For WBA (Super) and IBF super bantamweight titles
36	Win	33–3	Oscar Negrete	UD	10	Feb 13, 2021	Fantasy Springs Resort & Casino, Indio, California, U.S.	
35	Win	32–3	Hugo Berrio	KO	4 (12), 2:56	Nov 9, 2019	Staples Center, Los Angeles, California, U.S.	
34	Win	31–3	Diego De La Hoya	KO	6 (12), 1:17	Jul 13, 2019	Dignity Health Sports Park, Carson, California, U.S.	Won WBC-NABF and inaugural WBA Gold super bantamweight titles
33	Win	30–3	Daniel Olea	RTD	5 (8), 3:00	Apr 26, 2019	Forum, Inglewood, California, U.S.	
32	Loss	29–3	Azat Hovhannisyan	KO	6 (10), 1:12	Mar 9, 2018	The Hangar, Costa Mesa, California, U.S.	For WBC Continental Americas super bantamweight title
31	Win	29–2	Deivi Julio Bassa	UD	10	Dec 2, 2017	Madison Square Garden, New York City, New York, U.S.	
30	Loss	28–2	Rey Vargas	UD	12	Aug 26, 2017	StubHub Center, Carson, California, U.S.	For WBC super bantamweight title
29	Win	28–1	Daniel Noriega	TKO	4 (10), 2:22	May 6, 2017	T-Mobile Arena, Las Vegas, Nevada, U.S.	
28	Win	27–1	Roy Tapia	RTD	6 (10), 3:00	Dec 16, 2016	Fantasy Springs Casino, Indio, California, U.S.	
27	Win	26–1	Efrain Esquivias	TKO	2 (10), 0:37	Jun 3, 2016	Belasco Theater, Los Angeles, California, U.S.	
26	Win	25–1	Jayson Velez	UD	10	Nov 21, 2015	Mandalay Bay Hotel & Casino, Las Vegas, Nevada, U.S.	Won vacant WBC Silver featherweight title
25	Win	24–1	Sergio Frias	UD	10	Mar 20, 2015	Fantasy Springs Casino, Indio, California, U.S.	
24	Loss	23–1	Robinson Castellanos	TKO	5 (10), 0:11	Oct 10, 2014	Fantasy Springs Casino, Indio, California, U.S.	
23	Win	23–0	Andrew Cancio	UD	10	Apr 14, 2014	UIC Pavilion, Chicago, Illinois, U.S.	
22	Win	22–0	Jose Angel Beranza	UD	8	Sep 7, 2013	Fantasy Springs Casino, Indio, California, U.S.	
21	Win	21–0	Leonilo Miranda	TKO	6 (10), 1:37	Jun 8, 2013	Home Depot Center, Carson, California, U.S.	
20	Win	20–0	Rico Ramos	UD	10	Jan 11, 2013	Fantasy Springs Casino, Indio, California, U.S.	Won vacant NABF featherweight title
19	Win	19–0	David Rodela	TKO	9 (10), 1:14	Jul 28, 2012	Fantasy Springs Casino, Indio, California, U.S.	
18	Win	18–0	Guillermo Sanchez	UD	8	Apr 7, 2012	Phoenix Club, Anaheim, California, U.S.	
17	Win	17–0	Jeremy McLaurin	KO	4 (8), 2:31	Feb 4, 2012	Phoenix Club, Anaheim, California, U.S.	
16	Win	16–0	Roger Gonzalez	UD	8	Sep 30, 2011	Orange County Fairgrounds, Costa Mesa, California, U.S.	
15	Win	15–0	Noe Lopez	TKO	1 (8), 1:12	July 23, 2011	Mandalay Bay Resort & Casino, Las Vegas, U.S.	
14	Win	14–0	Georgi Kevlishvili	UD	8	May 20, 2011	Orange County Fairgrounds, Costa Mesa, California, U.S.	
13	Win	13–0	Adolfo Landeros	UD	8	Dec 17, 2010	Four Points Sheraton Hotel, San Diego, California, U.S.	
12	Win	12–0	Leivi Brea	KO	4 (6), 2:37	Aug 26, 2010	Club Nokia, Los Angeles, California, U.S.	
11	Win	11–0	Guadalupe De Leon	UD	6	May 22, 2010	Staples Center, Los Angeles, California, U.S.	
10	Win	10–0	Andres Ledesma	KO	5 (6), 1:45	Mar 25, 2010	Club Nokia, Los Angeles, California, U.S.	
9	Win	9–0	Willshaun Boxley	UD	6	Jan 29, 2010	Hard Rock Hotel and Casino, Las Vegas, U.S.	
8	Win	8–0	John Wampash	KO	6 (6), 1:53	Oct 10, 2009	Nokia Theater, Los Angeles, California, U.S.	
7	Win	7–0	Manuel Sarabia	KO	1 (4), 0:38	Sep 24, 2009	Club Nokia, Los Angeles, California, U.S.	
6	Win	6–0	Rodrigo Aranda	UD	4	Jul 30, 2009	Club Nokia, Los Angeles, California, U.S.	
5	Win	5–0	Alvaro Muro	KO	2 (4), 2:29	Jul 30, 2009	Hard Rock Hotel, San Diego, California, U.S.	
4	Win	4–0	Frank Gutierrez	UD	4	Mar 26, 2009	Four Points Sheraton Hotel, San Diego, California, U.S.	
3	Win	3–0	Benito Abraham	UD	4	Feb 12, 2009	Four Points Sheraton Hotel, San Diego, California, U.S.	
2	Win	2–0	Carlos Luque	MD	4	Dec 11, 2008	Marriott Hotel, Irvine, California, U.S.	
1	Win	1–0	Fermin Perez	TKO	1 (4), 1:28	Oct 24, 2008	DoubleTree Hotel, Ontario, California, U.S.	
