= Rey Vargas =

Mexican boxer (born 1990)

Personal information
- Born: Rey Geovani Vargas Roldán; 25 November 1990 (age 35) Otumba, Mexico
- Height: 5 ft 10 in (178 cm)
- Weight: Super bantamweight; Featherweight; Super Featherweight

Boxing career
- Reach: 71 1/2 in (182 cm)
- Stance: Orthodox

Boxing record
- Total fights: 38
- Wins: 36
- Win by KO: 22
- Losses: 1
- Draws: 1

Rey Geovani Vargas Roldán (born 25 November 1990) is a Mexican professional boxer. He is a world champion in two weight classes, having held the World Boxing Council (WBC) featherweight title from 2022 to 2024 and the WBC super bantamweight title from 2017 to 2020.

== Amateur career ==
Vargas won 7 national championships in Mexico as an amateur, as well as a gold medal in the 2009 Panamerican Championships. He competed in the 2009 World Championships but was defeated by Luke Campbell in the first round.

== Professional career ==
=== Early career ===
Vargas debuted as a professional in May 2010. He won the IBF Youth title in his 11th fight. Vargas won 15 of his first 16 fights by way of knockout. The first fighter to go the distance with him since his second fight was Yuki Murai. In March 2014, Vargas was knocked down for the first time against Sylvester Lopez. Vargas went down in round 2 but won the bout after Lopez suffered an injury and was unable to continue. The two rematched on November of that same year, Vargas won the second fight with a round 8 TKO. Vargas went down once again in round 2 of an eight-round fight against Lucian González, after an overhand right. Vargas was able to survive and get the unanimous decision (78–73, 78–74, 77–75).

In June 2016, Vargas won a shut-out unanimous decision (120–108, 120–108, 120–108) over Alexis Kabore. With the win, Vargas became the mandatory challenger to the WBC's super bantamweight titlist, Hugo Ruiz. In September 2016, Vargas defeated former WBA super flyweight champion Alexander Muñoz with a 5th-round TKO. Muñoz went down four times until the referee finally stopped the contest.

=== WBC super bantamweight champion ===
==== Vargas vs. McDonnell ====
On 25 February 2017, he faced Gavin McDonnell for the vacant WBC super bantamweight title. The title fight took place in Hull, England. Vargas established control of the fight early on, using his length and head movement to keep the hometown fighter at bay, while landing short combinations. McDonnell attempted to rally back during the later rounds, but he was ultimately unable to turn the scorecards around. Vargas won a majority decision (117–111, 116–112, 114–114) to become a world champion.

==== Vargas vs. Rios ====
Vargas' first defense would come on the Cotto-Kamegai undercard at the StubHub Center, against Ronny Rios. Vargas was also able to out-box Rios, controlling the bout by fighting at range. Vargas won via unanimous decision (118–110, 118–110, 115–113). Vargas made a second defense against Oscar Negrete in another Miguel Cotto undercard, in this case his farewell bout against Sadam Ali. The match was in December 2017 at Madison Square Garden, and was televised on HBO. Vargas was cut twice by headbutts but used his length effectively to cruise to a wide unanimous decision (119–109, 119–109, 120–108).

==== Vargas vs. Negrete ====
Vargas made his second title defense against the WBC–NABF bantamweight champion Oscar Negrete, who moved up a weight class in order to challenge Vargas. The bout was scheduled as to co-main event to the Miguel Cotto and Sadam Ali WBO super welterweight title fight. It took place at the Madison Square Garden in New York City on 2 December 2017 and was broadcast by Showtime. On 24 November, Vargas' head trainer Ignacio Beristáin revealed it would be their last fight together, as they agreed to part ways afterwards. Vargas won the fight by a wide unanimous decision. Two of the judges scored the fight 119–109 for him, while the third judge scored it 120–108 in his favor. Vargas was cut above each eye, with one cut happening due to an accidental headbutt in the seventh round, while the second cut came about for the same reason in the eight round.

==== Vargas vs. Hovhannisyan ====
Vargas made his third title defense against the twice-defeated Azat Hovhannisyan on 12 May 2018, at the Turning Stone Resort Casino in Verona, New York. Hovhannisyan was ranked #9 by the WBC at super bantamweight. The fight was booked as the co-main event of a WBO super welterweight title fight, same as his previous defense, between Sadam Ali and Jaime Munguia. He won the fight by unanimous decision, with scores of 116–112, 118–110 and 117–111. Vargas was once again cut by headbutts, once in the eight and once in the twelfth round.

==== Vargas vs. Manzanilla ====
Vargas made his fourth title defense against the WBC Silver super bantamweight champion Franklin Manzanilla on 9 February 2019 at the Fantasy Springs Casino in Indio, California. It took place following a nine-month absence from the sport caused by a shoulder surgery, followed by a respiratory infection. Manzanilla was ranked #3 by the WBC at super bantamweight. The bout served as the co-main event to the DAZN broadcast card headlined by a junior lightweight title fight between Alberto Machado and Andrew Cancio. Vargas won the fight by unanimous decision, with all three judges awarding him a 117–110 scorecard. He sustained three different cuts from head clashes. Manzanilla was twice deducted a point for hitting on the break. Vargas landed 207 of 719 total punches (28.8%) while Manzanilla landed 93 of 581 total punches (16%).

==== Vargas vs. Kameda ====
Vargas made his fifth title defense against the one-time WBO bantamweight champion Tomoki Kameda on 13 July 2019 at the Dignity Health Sports Park in Carson, California. Kameda had earned his right to challenge with a decision victory over Abigail Medina to capture the WBC interim super bantamweight championship. The bout was headlined a DAZN broadcast card. Vargas justified his role as the betting favorite, as he won the fight by unanimous decision. All three judges scored the fight 117–110 in his favor. Vargas out-landed Kameda 173 to 133 in total punches, but only 122 to 120 in power punches.

=== Featherweight ===
==== Vargas vs. Baez ====
On 13 August 2020, the WBC declared Vargas their super bantamweight champion-in-recess, as he suffered a broken leg in training which left him unable to defend for the remainder of the year. During this year, Vargas also departed from Golden Boy Promotions and signed with Premier Boxing Champions. For his first fight under the PBC banner, Vargas was booked to face Leonardo Baez. The fight took place on 6 November 2021, on the Canelo Álvarez vs. Caleb Plant undercard. He won the fight by unanimous decision, with one scorecard of 99–91 and two scorecards of 100–90.

==== WBC featherweight champion ====
===== Vargas vs. Magsayo =====
On 9 March 2022, it was announced that Vargas would challenge the reigning WBC featherweight champion Mark Magsayo in what was the champion's first title defense. Magsayo was ranked #2 by The Ring at featherweight. The fight was officially announced for 9 July 2022. It headlined a It headlined a Showtime card which took place at the Alamodome in San Antonio, Texas. Despite his role as the challenger, Vargas entered the fight as the favorite, with most odds-makers having him Magsayo a +105 underdog. He won the fight by split decision. Two of the judges scored the fight 115–112 in his favor, while the third judge scored the bout 114–113 for Magsayo. Vargas was knocked down with a counter right in the ninth round, but his opponent failed to capitalize on it. He landed 196 of 687 total punches (29%) and 135 of 339 power punches (40%), compared to Magsayo's 132 total punches and 92 power punches.

=== Super featherweight ===
==== Vargas vs. Foster ====
On 24 August 2022, Vargas received permission from the WBC to enter into negotiations for a title unification bout with the reigning WBA "Super" featherweight champion Léo Santa Cruz. As Vargas and Santa Cruz failed to reach an agreement, Vargas was instead permitted by the WBC to move up a weight class and face O'Shaquie Foster for the vacant WBC super featherweight title. The fight took place on 11 February 2023, at the Alamodome in San Antonio, Texas. Vargas suffered the first loss of his professional career, as Foster won the fight by unanimous decision, with scores of 116–112, 117–111 and 119–109. He struggled to compete at his usual range and was only able to land 101 total punches through the twelve rounds, 43 less than Foster, and 66 power punches, 21 less than Foster.

=== Return to featherweight ===
==== Vargas vs. Ball ====
On 8 March 2024 in Riyadh, Saudi Arabia, Vargas retained his WBC featherweight title via split draw against Nick Ball.

==== Champion in Recess ====
Following his fight with Ball, Vargas took time off from the ring due to an undisclosed injury that required surgery. During this time, he was made Champion in Recess, with Stephen Fulton capturing the vacant title in February 2025. On 27 June, it was announced that Vargas would return to the ring to face Carlos Castro. This news came following the announcement that Fulton would be moving up in weight to face O'Shaquie Foster for his WBC super-featherweight title that month, with Fulton potentially vacating his featherweight title and leaving Vargas free to be reinstated as champion and defend against Castro. However, the bout with Castro never took place as Fulton's bout with Foster was pushed back to October, thus extending his reign. It is unclear if there are plans to reschedule Vargas' bout with Castro.

== Professional boxing record ==
38 fights	36 wins	1 loss
By knockout	22	0
By decision	14	1
Draws	1	

No.	Result	Record	Opponent	Type	Round, time	Date	Location	Notes
38	Draw	36–1–1	Nick Ball	SD	12	8 March 2024	Kingdom Arena, Riyadh, Saudi Arabia	Retained WBC featherweight title
37	Loss	36–1	O'Shaquie Foster	UD	12	11 February 2023	Alamodome, San Antonio, Texas, U.S.	For vacant WBC super featherweight title
36	Win	36–0	Mark Magsayo	SD	12	9 July 2022	Alamodome, San Antonio, Texas, U.S.	Won WBC featherweight title
35	Win	35–0	Leonardo Baez	UD	10	6 November 2021	MGM Grand Garden Arena, Paradise, Nevada, U.S.	
34	Win	34–0	Tomoki Kameda	UD	12	13 July 2019	Dignity Health Sports Park, Carson, California, U.S.	Retained WBC super bantamweight title
33	Win	33–0	Franklin Manzanilla	UD	12	9 February 2019	Fantasy Springs Casino, Indio, California, U.S.	Retained WBC super bantamweight title
32	Win	32–0	Azat Hovhannisyan	UD	12	12 May 2018	Turning Stone Resort Casino, Verona, New York, U.S.	Retained WBC super bantamweight title
31	Win	31–0	Oscar Negrete	UD	12	2 December 2017	Madison Square Garden, New York, New York, U.S.	Retained WBC super bantamweight title
30	Win	30–0	Ronny Rios	UD	12	26 August 2017	StubHub Center, Carson, California, U.S.	Retained WBC super bantamweight title
29	Win	29–0	Gavin McDonnell	MD	12	25 February 2017	Hull Arena, Hull, England	Won vacant WBC super bantamweight title
28	Win	28–0	Alexander Muñoz	TKO	5 (12), 2:22	3 September 2016	Deportivo Zaragoza, Atizapán, Mexico	Won vacant WBC International Silver super bantamweight title
27	Win	27–0	Alexis Kabore	UD	12	11 June 2016	Arena Coliseo, Mexico City, Mexico	
26	Win	26–0	Christian Esquivel	TKO	3 (8), 1:01	27 February 2016	Honda Center, Anaheim, California, U.S.	
25	Win	25–0	Lucian González	UD	8	5 September 2015	Feria de San Isidro, Metepec, Mexico	
24	Win	24–0	Eduardo Mancito	UD	10	23 May 2015	Feria de San Isidro, Metepec, Mexico	
23	Win	23–0	Néstor Panigua	TKO	2 (12), 1:17	24 January 2015	Centro de Convenciones, Ixtapa, Mexico	Won vacant WBC International Silver super bantamweight title
22	Win	22–0	Sylvester Lopez	TKO	8 (12), 2:12	1 November 2014	Arena Coliseo, Mexico City, Mexico	Retained WBC Youth Silver super bantamweight title
21	Win	21–0	Daniel Ferreras	TKO	2 (10)	23 August 2014	Convention Center Surman Villa de las Flores, Coacalco, Mexico	Retained WBC Youth Silver super bantamweight title
20	Win	20–0	Vergel Nebran	TKO	6 (10), 2:34	14 June 2014	Explanada Municipal, Tlalnepantla, Mexico	Retained WBC Youth Silver super bantamweight title
19	Win	19–0	Sylvester Lopez	RTD	7 (10)	15 March 2014	Estadio de Beisbol, Cabo San Lucas, Mexico	
18	Win	18–0	Ernie Sánchez	UD	10	21 December 2013	Gimnasio Rodrigo M. Quevedo, Chihuahua, Mexico	Retained WBC Youth Silver super bantamweight title
17	Win	17–0	Yuki Murai	UD	10	26 October 2013	Deportivo Agustín Ramos Millán, Toluca, Mexico	Won vacant WBC Youth Silver super bantamweight title
16	Win	16–0	Juanito Rubillar	KO	4 (8), 2:58	24 August 2013	StubHub Center, Carson, California, U.S.	
15	Win	15–0	Cecilio Santos	KO	2 (10)	8 June 2013	Monumental Villa Charra, Tijuana, Mexico	
14	Win	14–0	Seizo Kono	TKO	3 (10), 2:22	27 April 2013	Arena Mexico, Mexico City, Mexico	Won vacant WBC Youth Intercontinental super bantamweight title
13	Win	13–0	Marcos Cárdenas	TKO	5 (8), 1:41	22 December 2012	Auditorio Bicentenario, Morelia, Mexico	
12	Win	12–0	Luis Lugo	TKO	5 (10), 2:47	2 June 2012	Coliseo Olímpico de la UdeG, Guadalajara, Mexico	
11	Win	11–0	Gabriel Aguillón	TKO	1 (10), 1:17	25 February 2012	Coliseo Olímpico de la UdeG, Guadalajara, Mexico	Won vacant IBF Youth super bantamweight title
10	Win	10–0	Rene Vázquez	TKO	2 (6), 0:26	23 July 2011	Coliseo Olímpico de la UdeG, Guadalajara, Mexico	
9	Win	9–0	Jorge Morales	TKO	2 (6)	25 March 2011	Arena Jalisco, Guadalajara, Mexico	
8	Win	8–0	Mario Alberto García	TKO	3 (8), 2:22	26 February 2011	Poliforum Zamna, Mérida, Mexico	
7	Win	7–0	Jesus Santillan	TKO	7 (8)	22 January 2011	Arena Neza, Ciudad Nezahualcóyotl, Mexico	
6	Win	6–0	Jorge Otocani Reynoso	TKO	1 (6), 2:07	6 November 2010	Poliforum Zamna, Mérida, Mexico	
5	Win	5–0	Fabian Ruiz	KO	1 (6), 2:23	2 October 2010	Coliseo Olímpico de la UdeG, Guadalajara, Mexico	
4	Win	4–0	Jose Luis Medellin	TKO	2 (4)	4 September 2010	Arena Solidaridad, Monterrey, Mexico	
3	Win	3–0	Juan Antonio Duque	TKO	2 (4)	21 August 2010	Arena Jalisco, Guadalajara, Mexico	
2	Win	2–0	Hector Esnar Bobadilla	UD	4	29 May 2010	Arena Tecate, Guadalajara, Mexico	
1	Win	1–0	Claudio Palacios	KO	1 (4)	10 April 2010	Palenque de la Feria, Durango, Mexico	

== Titles in boxing ==
=== Major world titles ===
- WBC super bantamweight champion (122 lbs)
- WBC featherweight champion (126 lbs)

=== Regional/International titles ===
- IBF Youth super bantamweight champion (122 lbs)
- WBC Youth Intercontinental super bantamweight champion (122 lbs)
- WBC Youth Silver super bantamweight champion (122 lbs)
- WBC International Silver super bantamweight champion (122 lbs) (2x)

== See also ==
- List of world super-bantamweight boxing champions
- List of world featherweight boxing champions
- List of Mexican boxing world champions

Sporting positions
Regional boxing titles
Vacant Title last held by Jaderes Padua	WBC Youth Intercontinental super bantamweight champion 27 April 2013 – June 2013	Vacant Title next held by Kittithat Ungsrivongs
Vacant Title last held by Fatiou Fassniou	WBC International Silver super bantamweight champion 24 January 2015 – May 2015	Vacant Title next held by Guillermo Rigondeaux
Vacant Title last held by Guillermo Rigondeaux	WBC International Silver super bantamweight champion 3 September 2016 – January 2017; Vacated	Vacant Title next held by Paulus Ambunda
Minor world boxing titles
Vacant Title last held by Jeremy Parodi	IBF Youth super bantamweight champion 25 February 2012 – June 2012	Vacant Title next held by Kid Galahad
Vacant Title last held by Ray Perez	WBC Youth Silver super bantamweight champion 26 October 2013 – December 2014	Vacant Title next held by David Reyes Cota
Major world boxing titles
Vacant Title last held by Hozumi Hasegawa	WBC super bantamweight champion 25 February 2017 – 14 August 2020; Stripped	Vacant Title next held by Luis Nery
Preceded by Mark Magsayo	WBC featherweight champion 9 July 2022 – 18 October 2024; Status changed	Succeeded by Brandon Figueroa interim champion promoted
