= Thomas Patrick Ward =

British professional boxer (born 1994)

Personal information
- Nickname: Taylor Ward
- Nationality: British
- Born: 15 May 1994 (age 32) County Durham, England
- Height: 5 ft 6 in (168 cm)
- Weight: Super-bantamweight

Boxing career
- Stance: Orthodox

Boxing record
- Total fights: 37
- Wins: 34
- Win by KO: 5
- Losses: 2
- Draws: 1

Thomas Patrick Ward (born 15 May 1994) is a British professional boxer. He has held the NABA super-bantamweight title since 2019, and previously held the British super-bantamweight title in 2017.

== Professional career ==
Born in County Durham in 1994, and based in West Rainton, Ward had a junior amateur record of 60 wins from 64 fights, including winning a gold medal at the European under-17s championship in Ukraine, and was voted Best Junior Boxer by the ABA.

He turned professional at the age of 17 without having any senior amateur fights, and made his professional debut in July 2012 with a points win over Elemir Rafael.

By 2017 he had won 20 straight fights, including wins over former Ghanaian bantamweight champion Isaac Owusu, Nasibu Ramadhan, Everth Briceno, and Robbie Turley, leading to a British title shot.

Ward challenged for Jazza Dickens' British title at the First Direct Arena in Leeds in May 2017. An accidental clash of heads in the ninth round left Ward with a cut above his left eye that caused the fight to be stopped. Ahead on the scorecards at the time, Ward became British champion. He made one successful defence of the title in November, beating Sean Davis by unanimous decision.

== Professional boxing record ==
36 fights	34 wins	1 loss
By knockout	5	1
By decision	29	0
Draws	1	

No.	Result	Record	Opponent	Type	Round, time	Date	Location	Notes
35	Win	34–1–1	(Tanzania) Amani Bariki	PTS	8	16 Mar 2024	(United Kingdom) Rainton Meadows Arena, Houghton-le-Spring, England	
35	Loss	33–1–1	(Uzbekistan) Otabek Kholmatov	TKO	5 (12), 2:58	4 Mar 2023	(United Kingdom) Newcastle Arena, Newcastle, England	
34	Win	33–0–1	(Tanzania) Ally Mwerangi	TKO	3 (10), 3:00	17 Jul 2022	(United Kingdom) Stadium of Light, Sunderland, England	
33	Win	32–0–1	(Burkina Faso) Alexis Boureima Kabore	PTS	10	25 Mar 2022	(United Kingdom) Newcastle Arena, Newcastle, England	
32	Win	31–0–1	(Venezuela) Leonardo Padilla	UD	10	18 Dec 2021	(United Kingdom) Rainton Meadows Arena, Houghton-le-Spring, England	
31	Win	30–0–1	(Mexico) Edy Valencia Mercado	UD	10	12 Jun 2021	(United Kingdom) Vertu Motors Arena, Newcastle, England	
30	Draw	29–0–1	(Cameroon) Thomas Essomba	TD	8 (10), 3:00	17 Oct 2020	(United Kingdom) East of England Arena, Peterborough, England	Split TD after Ward cut from accidental head clash
29	Win	29–0	(Mexico) Martin Casillas	UD	8	22 Nov 2019	(United Arab Emirates) Caesars Palace, Dubai, UAE	
28	Win	28–0	(Nicaragua) Yesner Talavera	PTS	10	28 Sep 2019	(United Kingdom) Eagles Community Arena, Newcastle, England	
27	Win	27–0	(Nicaragua) Brayan Mairena	PTS	8	20 Jul 2019	(United Kingdom) Brentwood Centre, Brentwood, England	
26	Win	26–0	(United States) Jesse Angel Hernandez	UD	10	15 Feb 2019	(United States) Kansas Star Arena, Mulvane, Kansas, U.S.	Won vacant WBA-NABA super-bantamweight title
25	Win	25–0	(Germany) Tom Tran	KO	1 (4), 2:58	13 Oct 2018	(United Kingdom) Metro Radio Arena, Newcastle, England	
24	Win	24–0	(Spain) Alvaro Rodriguez	UD	10	27 Jul 2018	(United Kingdom) Rainton Meadows Arena, Houghton-le-Spring, England	Won vacant IBF European super-bantamweight title
23	Win	23–0	(Nicaragua) Lesther Cantillano	TKO	5 (6), 2:05	10 Mar 2018	(United Kingdom) Rainton Meadows Arena, Houghton-le-Spring, England	
22	Win	22–0	(United Kingdom) Sean Davis	UD	12	11 Nov 2017	(United Kingdom) Metro Radio Arena, Newcastle, England	Retained British super-bantamweight title
21	Win	21–0	(United Kingdom) Jazza Dickens	TD	9 (12), 1:12	13 May 2017	(United Kingdom) First Direct Arena, Leeds, England	Won British super-bantamweight title; Unanimous TD after Ward cut from accidental head clash
20	Win	20–0	(Lithuania) Simon Volosinas	PTS	6	4 Mar 2017	(United Kingdom) Rainton Meadows Arena, Houghton-le-Spring, England	
19	Win	19–0	(Hungary) Norbert Kalucza	KO	4 (6), 2:55	8 Oct 2016	(United Kingdom) Leisure Centre, Ashington, England	
18	Win	18–0	(Nicaragua) Elvis Guillen	PTS	6	10 Jul 2016	(United Kingdom) Stadium of Light, Sunderland, England	
17	Win	17–0	(United Kingdom) Robbie Turley	UD	10	5 Mar 2016	(United Kingdom) Rainton Meadows Arena, Houghton-le-Spring, England	
16	Win	16–0	(Nicaragua) Everth Briceno	PTS	6	20 Nov 2015	(United Kingdom) Rainton Meadows Arena, Houghton-le-Spring, England	
15	Win	15–0	(Tanzania) Nasibu Ramadhani	PTS	10	19 Sep 2015	(United Kingdom) Lancastrian Suite, Dunston, England	
14	Win	14–0	(Latvia) Dmitrijs Gutmans	PTS	6	5 Jul 2015	(United Kingdom) Stadium of Light, Sunderland, England	
13	Win	13–0	(Georgia (country)) Giorgi Gachechiladze	PTS	6	8 Mar 2015	(United Kingdom) Rainton Meadows Arena, Houghton-le-Spring, England	
12	Win	12–0	(Ghana) Isaac Owusu	PTS	6	6 Feb 2015	(United Kingdom) Village Urban Resort, Blackpool, England	
11	Win	11–0	(United Kingdom) Chris Adaway	PTS	6	13 Dec 2014	(United Kingdom) Hillsborough Leisure Centre, Sheffield, England	
10	Win	10–0	(United Kingdom) Jamie Quinn	PTS	4	12 Oct 2014	(United Kingdom) Temple Park Leisure Centre, North Shields, England	
9	Win	9–0	(Croatia) Antonio Horvatic	PTS	4	6 Sep 2014	(United Kingdom) Doncaster Dome, Doncaster, England	
8	Win	8–0	(South Africa) Michael Ramabeletsa	PTS	6	7 Jun 2014	(United Kingdom) Metro Radio Arena, Newcastle, England	
7	Win	7–0	(United Kingdom) Qasim Hussain	PTS	4	29 Mar 2014	(United Kingdom) Metro Radio Arena, Newcastle, England	
6	Win	6–0	(United Kingdom) Qasim Hussain	PTS	4	7 Dec 2013	(United Kingdom) Centre for Sport, Newcastle, England	
5	Win	5–0	(Hungary) Adrian Fuzesi	PTS	6	13 Sep 2013	(United Kingdom) Lancastrian Suite, Dunston, England	
4	Win	4–0	(United Kingdom) Ben Morrish	PTS	4	7 Jul 2013	(United Kingdom) Stadium of Light, Sunderland, England	
3	Win	3–0	(United Kingdom) Delroy Spencer	PTS	4	24 Nov 2012	(United Kingdom) 02 Academy, Newcastle, England	
2	Win	2–0	(United Kingdom) David Lake	TKO	4 (4), 2:27	9 Sep 2012	(United Kingdom) 02 Academy, Newcastle, England	
1	Win	1–0	(Slovenia) Elemir Rafael	PTS	4	15 Jun 2012	(United Kingdom) Stadium of Light, Sunderland, England	

Sporting positions
Regional boxing titles
Preceded by Jazza Dickens	British super-bantamweight champion 13 May 2017 – 2018	Vacant Title next held by Brad Foster
