= Rolando Magbanua =

Filipino boxer

Personal information
- Nickname: Smooth Operator
- Nationality: (Philippines) Filipino
- Born: Rolando Magbanua; March 17, 1985 (age 41) Pigcawayan, Cotabato, Philippines
- Height: 5 ft 7 in (1.70 m)
- Weight: Bantamweight

Boxing career
- Stance: Orthodox

Boxing record
- Total fights: 20
- Wins: 19
- Win by KO: 14
- Losses: 1
- Draws: 0

Rolando Magbanua (born March 17, 1985) is a Filipino professional boxer.

He is the current interim WBO Oriental bantamweight champion.

== Boxing career ==
Magbanua made his professional debut on January 20, 2007, defeating Joe Galamition at the NotreDame of Midsayap Gym in Midsayap, Cotabato, Philippines.

== Professional boxing record ==
36 fights	29 wins	7 losses
By knockout	21	5
By decision	8	2

No.	Result	Record	Opponent	Type	Round, time	Date	Location	Notes
36	Loss	29–7	Joet Gonzalez	KO	5 (10), 2:06	22 Mar 2018	Fantasy Springs Casino, Indio, California, U.S.	
35	Win	29–6	Eddie Estibat	TKO	5 (6), 2:41	1 Nov 2017	Barangay Saint Felomina, Iligan, Philippines	
34	Win	28–6	Jeffrey Jimenez	TKO	3 (10), 2:21	27 Sep 2017	Central Market Gym, Iligan, Philippines	
33	Loss	27–6	Eduardo Hernández	KO	1 (10), 2:24	24 Jun 2017	Gimnasio Municipal "José Neri Santos", Ciudad Juárez, Mexico	For WBC Youth super featherweight title
32	Loss	27–5	Roman Andreev	KO	5 (12), 2:51	20 Sep 2016	Manezh, Vladikavkaz, Russia	For vacant WBO Inter-Continental lightweight title
31	Win	27–4	Melchar Valiente	TKO	3 (8), 1:31	27 Mar 2016	Central Market Gym, Iligan, Philippines	
30	Loss	26–4	Alberto Guevara	TKO	6 (10)	10 Oct 2015	Auditorio Municipal de Cabo San Lucas, Los Cabos, Mexico	
29	Loss	26–3	Rey Laspinas	TKO	6 (10), 2:59	26 Jun 2015	Almendras Gym, Davao City, Philippines	
28	Win	26–2	JP Macadumpis	KO	3 (8), 0:29	8 Dec 2014	M'lang, Cotabato, Philippines	
27	Win	25–2	Joel Escol	KO	1 (10), 1:53	11 Oct 2014	Almendras Gym, Davao City, Philippines	
26	Win	24–2	JR Mendoza	UD	8	28 Jun 2014	Almendras Gym, Davao City, Philippines	
25	Win	23–2	Philip Parcon	UD	6	4 Aug 2013	M'lang Municipal Gymnasium, M'lang, Philippines	
24	Win	22–2	Rene Manlapaz	UD	10	28 Apr 2012	CCDC Gym, La Trinidad, Philippines	
23	Win	21–2	Landy Cris Leon	KO	1 (6), 2:58	17 Mar 2012	Makilala, Cotabato, Philippines	
22	Win	20–2	Gilbert Garciano	RTD	2 (6)	4 Dec 2011	M'lang, Cotabato, Philippines	
21	Loss	19–2	Jason Egera	SD	10	15 Jan 2011	I.T. Park, Cebu City, Philippines	
20	Win	19–1	Rolando Omela	KO	2 (6), 2:42	25 Sep 2010	M'lang, Cotabato, Philippines	
19	Win	18–1	Nicardo Calamba	KO	2 (8), 1:15	1 Aug 2010	M'lang Municipal Gymnasium, M'lang, Philippines	
18	Loss	17–1	Eric Barcelona	UD	10	9 Aug 2009	Magpet Municipal Gym, Magpet, Philippines	
17	Win	17–0	Reggie Binueza	TKO	3 (8), 1:01	4 Jul 2009	Midsayap Municipal Gym, Midsayap	
16	Win	16–0	Dunryl Marcos	TKO	5 (10), 2:05	23 May 2009	Medina Gymnasium, Ozamiz, Philippines	
15	Win	15–0	Yong Sathong	KO	3 (12), 1:27	25 Apr 2009	Cebu Coliseum, Cebu City, Philippines	Retained WBO Oriental interim bantamweight title
14	Win	14–0	José Ángel Cota	TKO	6 (12), 1:08	29 Feb 2009	Cebu Coliseum, Cebu City, Philippines	Won vacant WBO Oriental interim bantamweight title
13	Win	13–0	Richard Betos	UD	8	20 Dec 2008	M'lang, Cotabato, Philippines	
12	Win	12–0	Thiti Sit-Kosol	TKO	3 (8), 2:04	30 Nov 2008	Mandaue City Sports and Cultural Complex, Mandaue, Philippines	
11	Win	11–0	Yodchanchai Sithsoei	TKO	1 (10), 1:29	19 Oct 2008	Municipal Gymnasium, Pigcawayan, Philippines	
10	Win	10–0	Ruben Santillanosa	TKO	5 (10), 1:19	27 Sep 2008	M'lang Municipal Gymnasium, M'lang, Philippines	
9	Win	9–0	Jerry Manganip	TKO	6 (8), 2:40	9 Aug 2008	Magpet Municipal Gym, Magpet, Philippines	
8	Win	8–0	Jerry Manganip	UD	8	21 Jun 2008	Midsayap Municipal Gym, Midsayap, Philippines	
7	Win	7–0	Jaime Acerda	TKO	2 (8), 2:27	12 Apr 2008	Municipal Gymnasium, Pigcawayan, Philippines	
6	Win	6–0	Edison Berwela	TKO	2 (6), 2:51	19 Jan 2008	Midsayap, Cotabato, Philippines	
5	Win	5–0	Romnick Rapista	UD	6	29 Sep 2007	M'lang, Cotabato, Philippines	
4	Win	4–0	Roland Econas	UD	6	10 Aug 2007	Magpet Municipality Gym, Magpet, Philippines	
3	Win	3–0	Daniel Solis	UD	6	30 Jun 2007	Barangay Amas, Kidapawan, Philippines	
2	Win	2–0	Jujith Aredidon	TKO	1 (4), 2:27	28 Apr 2007	Kidapawan, Cotabato, Philippines	
1	Win	1–0	Joe Galamition	TKO	3 (4), 1:12	20 Jan 2007	Notre Dame of Midsayap College Gym, Midsayap, Philippines	
