= Muhammadkhuja Yaqubov =

Tajikistani boxer

Personal information
- Nationality: Tajikistani
- Born: 31 March 1995 (age 31) Isfara, Tajikistan
- Height: 5 ft 5 in (1.65 m)
- Weight: Super-featherweight; Lightweight

Boxing career
- Stance: Southpaw

Boxing record
- Total fights: 25
- Wins: 23
- Win by KO: 12
- Losses: 1
- Draws: 1

Muhammadkhuja Iskandarovich Yaqubov (born 31 March 1995) is a Tajikistani professional boxer who has held the WBC International super-featherweight title since 2018.

== Amateur career ==
Yaqubov started boxing at the age of 10 and reached the rank of Candidate for Master of Sport (кмс).

== Professional career ==
Yaqubov turned professional in late 2015, signing a deal with RCC Boxing Promotions. He soon made his debut on 12 December of that year, defeating fellow debutant Vladimir Terekhov in Saint Petersburg. After three more victories he received his first title shot on 15 November 2016, and defeated Nikolai Buzolin by eighth-round technical knockout (TKO) to win the WBC–ABCO Continental lightweight title. He retained it three months later against veteran Yogli Herrera by way of unanimous decision (UD). In his next fight he picked up the vacant WBO Youth lightweight title; his opponent Feruzbek Yuldashev didn't answer the bell for the fifth round due to injury. Two months later he successfully defended it, scoring three knockdowns en route to a first-round TKO of Japanese challenger Daiki Ichikawa.

On 10 February 2018, Yaqubov defeated young prospect Mark Urvanov by UD in Yekaterinburg, adding the WBA Continental and IBF Baltic super-featherweight titles to his résumé. He won the vacant WBC International super-featherweight title a few months after that, stopping Víctor Alejandro Zúñiga in the first round with a shot to the solar plexus on 19 August. In his first defense of the WBC International belt in February 2019, he decisioned Emanuel López at the KRK Uralets. He also outpointed NABF champ Abraham Montoya and former world champ Tomás Rojas in subsequent title bouts. Yaqubov made his fourth WBC International title defense against Lunga Sitemela on 27 March 2021, whom he beat by unanimous decision.

Yaubov faced O'Shaquie Foster in a WBC title eliminator on 18 March 2022, on the undercard of the Sunny Edwards and Muhammad Waseem IBF title bout. He lost the fight by unanimous decision, with scores of 118–109, 117–110 and 117–110. Yaqubov rebounded from the first loss of his professional career with a unanimous decision victory over Carlos Daniel Cordoba on 11 September 2022, and a knockout of Javokhirbek Karimov on April 28, 2023.

== Professional boxing record ==
25 fights	23 wins	1 loss
By knockout	12	0
By decision	11	1
Draws	1	

No.	Result	Record	Opponent	Type	Round, time	Date	Location	Notes
26	Loss	23–2–1	Erdenebatyn Tsendbaatar	UD	10	13 Nov 2026	County Coliseum, El Paso, Texas, U.S.	For WBC USA super featherweight title
25	Draw	23–1–1	Cristian Cruz Chacon	SD	10	29 Nov 2025	Save Mart Arena, Fresno, California, U.S.	Retained WBC USA super featherweight title
24	Win	23–1	William Foster III	MD	10	15 Aug 2025	ProBox Event Center, Plant City, Florida, U.S.	Won vacant WBC USA super featherweight title
23	Win	22–1	Zafar Parpiev	RTD	4 (8), 3:00	12 Dec 2024	Soviet Wings Sport Palace, Moscow, Russia	
22	Win	21–1	Pablo Vicente	UD	10	25 Nov 2023	Michelob Ultra Arena, Las Vegas, Nevada, U.S.	
21	Win	20–1	Javokhirbek Karimov	KO	1 (8), 2:51	28 Apr 2023	Dushanbe Tennis Palace, Dushanbe, Tajikistan	
20	Win	19–1	Carlos Daniel Cordoba	UD	8	11 Sep 2022	Traktor Sport Palace, Chelyabinsk, Russia	
19	Loss	18–1	O'Shaquie Foster	UD	12	18 Mar 2022	Aviation Club Tennis Centre, Dubai, United Arab Emirates	For WBC Silver super-featherweight title
18	Win	18–0	Christian Palma	RTD	4 (10), 3:00	11 Sep 2021	RCC Boxing Academy, Yekaterinburg, Russia	Retained WBC International super-featherweight title
17	Win	17–0	Lunga Sitemela	UD	10	27 Mar 2021	RCC Boxing Academy, Yekaterinburg, Russia	Retained WBC International super-featherweight title
16	Win	16–0	Tomás Rojas	UD	12	7 Mar 2020	RCC Boxing Academy, Yekaterinburg, Russia	Retained WBC International super-featherweight title
15	Win	15–0	Abraham Montoya	UD	12	2 Nov 2019	RCC Boxing Academy, Yekaterinburg, Russia	Retained WBC International super-featherweight title
14	Win	14–0	Jhon Gemino	KO	2 (8), 1:26	13 Jul 2019	RCC Boxing Academy, Yekaterinburg, Russia	
13	Win	13–0	Emanuel López	UD	10	22 Feb 2019	KRK Uralets, Yekaterinburg, Russia	Retained WBC International super-featherweight title
12	Win	12–0	Víctor Alejandro Zúñiga	KO	1 (10), 2:51	19 Aug 2018	DIVS, Yekaterinburg, Russia	Won vacant WBC International super-featherweight title
11	Win	11–0	Mark Urvanov	UD	12	10 Feb 2018	DIVS, Yekaterinburg, Russia	Won vacant WBA Continental and IBF Baltic super-featherweight titles
10	Win	10–0	Jaime Barcelona	KO	1 (8), 1:34	15 Dec 2017	DIVS, Yekaterinburg, Russia	
9	Win	9–0	Ernie Sanchez	KO	4 (8), 1:01	9 Sep 2017	Traktor Sport Palace, Chelyabinsk, Russia	
8	Win	8–0	Daiki Ichikawa	TKO	1 (8), 1:50	9 Jul 2017	DIVS, Yekaterinburg, Russia	Retained WBO Youth lightweight title
7	Win	7–0	Feruzbek Yuldashev	RTD	4 (8), 3:00	2 May 2017	Dom Pechati, Yekaterinburg, Russia	Won vacant WBO Youth lightweight title
6	Win	6–0	Yogli Herrera	UD	10	18 Feb 2017	Traktor Sport Palace, Chelyabinsk, Russia	Retains WBC–ABCO Continental lightweight title
5	Win	5–0	Nikolai Buzolin	TKO	8 (10), 0:29	15 Nov 2016	Dom Pechati, Yekaterinburg, Russia	Won vacant WBC–ABCO Continental lightweight title
4	Win	4–0	Andranik Hloyan	KO	4 (8), 1:58	17 Sep 2016	SKK im Blinova, Omsk, Russia	
3	Win	3–0	Nikolai Buzolin	SD	6	8 May 2016	Sports Palace, Vidnoye, Russia	
2	Win	2–0	Amir Saltayev	MD	4	22 Apr 2016	SuperClub, Pskov, Russia	
1	Win	1–0	Vladimir Terekhov	RTD	3 (4), 3:00	12 Dec 2015	Saturn Boxing Club, Saint Petersburg, Russia	
