= Fernando Beltrán Jr. =

Mexican boxer (born 1981)

Fernando Beltrán
Personal information
- Nickname: Pinocho
- Born: Fernando Manuel Beltrán Machado; 18 August 1981 (age 44) Culiacán, Sinaloa, Mexico
- Height: 5 ft 10 in (180 cm)
- Weight: Featherweight; Super featherweight Lightweight

Boxing career
- Reach: 73 in (185 cm)
- Stance: Southpaw

Boxing record
- Total fights: 47
- Wins: 37
- Win by KO: 20
- Losses: 8
- Draws: 1
- No contests: 1

Fernando Manuel Beltrán Machado (born 18 August 1981) is a Mexican former professional boxer who competed from 2000 to 2015. He held the IBO featherweight title and twice challenged for a world super bantamweight title.

== Professional career ==
=== IBO Featherweight Championship ===
On August 22, 2008 Beltrán won the IBO Featherweight title by beating South Africa's Takalani Ndlovu in Sommet Center, Nashville, Tennessee.

== Professional boxing record ==
47 fights	37 wins	8 losses
By knockout	20	1
By decision	16	7
By disqualification	1	0
Draws	1	
No contests	1	

No.	Result	Record	Opponent	Type	Round, time	Date	Location	Notes
47	Win	37–8–1 (1)	Jorge Sillas Amor	UD	6	8 Oct 2015	Rancho Grande Bar, Tijuana, Mexico	
46	Loss	36–8–1 (1)	Diego Magdaleno	TKO	7 (10), 2:28	23 Mar 2012	Casino del Sol, Tucson, Arizona, U.S.	For WBC-NABF super-featherweight title
45	Loss	36–7–1 (1)	Efrain Esquivias Jr.	MD	10	4 Nov 2011	DoubleTree Hotel, Ontario, California, U.S.	For vacant WBC-NABF super-bantamweight title
44	Win	36–6–1 (1)	Yair Secundino	TKO	3 (10), 2:42	1 Oct 2011	Auditorio de la Unidad Deportiva Morelos, Colima, Mexico	
43	Loss	35–6–1 (1)	Michael Farenas	SD	8	16 Jul 2011	Neal S. Blaisdell Center, Honolulu, Hawaii, U.S.	
42	Loss	35–5–1 (1)	Jorge Lacierva	UD	12	2 Apr 2011	Auditorio del Estado, Mexicali, Mexico	
41	Win	35–4–1 (1)	Ricardo Castillo	UD	10	16 Dec 2010	Parque Revolución, Culiacán, Mexico	
40	Loss	34–4–1 (1)	Miguel Ángel González	UD	10	29 May 2010	Arena Tecate, Guadalajara, Mexico	
39	Win	34–3–1 (1)	Rafael Urias	RTD	8 (10), 3:00	5 Mar 2010	Parque Revolución, Culiacán, Mexico	
38	Win	33–3–1 (1)	Monty Meza-Clay	UD	12	19 Jun 2009	Entertainment Center, Laredo, Texas, U.S.	Retained IBF Latino featherweight title
37	Win	32–3–1 (1)	Miguel Román	SD	12	20 Mar 2009	Entertainment Center, Laredo, Texas, U.S.	Won vacant IBF Latino featherweight title
36	Win	31–3–1 (1)	Takalani Ndlovu	SD	12	22 Aug 2008	Sommet Center, Nashville, Tennessee, U.S.	Won vacant IBO featherweight title
35	Loss	30–3–1 (1)	Steve Molitor	UD	12	5 Apr 2008	Casino, Rama, Canada	For IBF super-bantamweight title
34	Win	30–2–1 (1)	José Arboleda	TKO	10 (12)	15 Dec 2007	Auditorio Benito Juárez, Guadalajara, Mexico	
33	Win	29–2–1 (1)	Baudel Cárdenas	UD	10	9 Mar 2007	Dodge Arena, Hidalgo, Texas, U.S.	
32	Win	28–2–1 (1)	Édel Ruiz	DQ	5 (8), 2:00	18 Nov 2006	Thomas & Mack Center, Paradise, Nevada, U.S.	
31	NC	27–2–1 (1)	Salvador Garcia	NC	2 (12), 2:22	8 Sep 2006	Gilley's, Dallas, Texas, U.S.	For vacant WBC Continental Americas super-bantamweight title
30	Win	27–2–1	Hugo Vargas	UD	10	17 Jun 2006	Emerald Queen Casino, Tacoma, Washington, U.S.	
29	Loss	26–2–1	Hugo Dianzo	MD	10	15 Oct 2005	Speaking Rock Casino, El Paso, Texas, U.S.	
28	Win	26–1–1	Félix Flores	UD	10	21 Jul 2005	HP Pavilion, San Jose, California, U.S.	
27	Win	25–1–1	Moisés Zamudio	UD	10	1 Jul 2005	Parque Revolución, Culiacán, Mexico	
26	Loss	24–1–1	Joan Guzmán	UD	12	22 Apr 2005	Dodge Arena, Hidalgo, Texas, U.S.	For WBO super-bantamweight title
25	Win	24–0–1	Gerardo Martínez	TD	6 (10), 3:00	14 Mar 2005	Parque Revolución, Culiacán, Mexico	Unanimous TD
24	Win	23–0–1	Alejandro Medina	TKO	7 (10), 1:17	18 Dec 2004	Universidad Autónoma de Sinaloa, Culiacán, Mexico	
23	Win	22–0–1	José Navarrete	TKO	6 (10)	18 Nov 2004	Culiacán, Sinaloa, Mexico	
22	Win	21–0–1	David Vasquez	UD	6	2 Apr 2004	Gimnasio, Mexicali, Mexico	
21	Win	20–0–1	Osvaldo Guerrero	TKO	4 (10)	10 Dec 2003	Culiacán, Sinaloa, Mexico	
20	Win	19–0–1	Victor Rabanales	UD	10	21 Nov 2003	Culiacán, Sinaloa, Mexico	
19	Win	18–0–1	Pedro Domínguez	TKO	4 (10)	10 Oct 2003	Parque Revolución, Culiacán, Mexico	
18	Win	17–0–1	José Guadalupe Gastélum	TKO	5 (10)	29 Aug 2003	Parque Revolución, Culiacán, Mexico	
17	Win	16–0–1	Manuel Ibáñez	TKO	3 (10)	1 Aug 2003	Culiacán, Sinaloa, Mexico	
16	Win	15–0–1	Genaro Valencia	TKO	1 (10)	27 Jun 2003	Culiacán, Sinaloa, Mexico	
15	Draw	14–0–1	José Guadalupe Gastélum	TD	4 (10)	30 May 2003	Parque Revolución, Culiacán, Mexico	
14	Win	14–0	Arturo Valenzuela	TKO	8 (10)	24 Mar 2003	Tijuana, Baja California, Mexico	
13	Win	13–0	Saúl López	KO	3 (8)	25 Oct 2002	Parque Revolución, Culiacán, Mexico	
12	Win	12–0	José Alberto Mendoza	TKO	3 (8)	16 Aug 2002	Culiacán, Sinaloa, Mexico	
11	Win	11–0	Raúl Ruiz	TKO	1 (8)	2 Aug 2002	Parque Revolución, Culiacán, Mexico	
10	Win	10–0	Antonio Torres Nava	UD	6	20 Jul 2002	Tijuana, Baja California, Mexico	
9	Win	9–0	Antonio Valencia	KO	1 (6)	14 Jun 2002	Auditorio Benito Juárez, Los Mochis, Mexico	
8	Win	8–0	Carlos Ríos	UD	6	15 Feb 2002	Culiacán, Sinaloa, Mexico	
7	Win	7–0	Arnoldo Castro	TKO	1 (6)	12 Dec 2001	Culiacán, Sinaloa, Mexico	
6	Win	6–0	Carlos Miguel Arce	UD	6	20 Oct 2001	Guamúchil, Sinaloa, Mexico	
5	Win	5–0	Aarón Sepúlveda	TKO	3 (6)	20 Jul 2001	Culiacán, Sinaloa, Mexico	
4	Win	4–0	Aarón Sepúlveda	TKO	2 (4)	1 Jun 2001	Culiacán, Sinaloa, Mexico	
3	Win	3–0	Gilberto Hernández	UD	4	9 Dec 2000	Auditorio Municipal, Tijuana, Mexico	
2	Win	2–0	Aarón Sepúlveda	TKO	4 (4)	19 May 2000	Culiacán, Sinaloa, Mexico	
1	Win	1–0	Arnoldo Valles	TKO	3 (4)	14 Apr 2000	Los Mochis, Sinaloa, Mexico	

Preceded by Cristóbal Cruz	IBO Featherweight Champion; August 22, 2008 – November 6, 2009; Vacated	Vacant Title next held by Jackson Asiku

== See also ==
- List of Mexican boxing world champions
- List of IBO World Champions
