= Daniel Ponce de León =

Mexican boxer (born 1980)

Personal information
- Nickname: El León ("The Lion")
- Born: July 27, 1980 (age 46) Ciudad Cuauhtémoc, Chihuahua, Mexico
- Height: 5 ft 5 in (165 cm)
- Weight: Bantamweight; Super bantamweight; Featherweight; Super featherweight

Boxing career
- Reach: 67 1/2 in (171 cm)
- Stance: Southpaw

Boxing record
- Total fights: 52
- Wins: 45
- Win by KO: 35
- Losses: 7
Medal record
Men's amateur boxing
Representing Mexico
Pan American Games
Bronze medal – third place	1999 Winnipeg	Flyweight

Daniel Ponce de León (born July 27, 1980) is a Mexican former professional boxer who competed from 2001 to 2014. He was a world champion in two weight classes, having held the World Boxing Organization (WBO) super bantamweight title from 2005 and 2008, and the World Boxing Council (WBC) featherweight title from 2012 to 2013. As an amateur, Ponce de León won a bronze medal in the flyweight division at the 1999 Pan American Games, and was a member of the 2000 Mexican Olympic team in the featherweight division. He was trained by Vicente Juárez.

== Early life ==
Ponce de León is a Tarahumara Amerindian, raised in the Sierra Madre Occidental mountain range. Out of five brothers he was the only one to survive, due to the harsh conditions in his tribal area, the Sierra Madre.

== Amateur career ==
Ponce de León was a Mexican National Amateur champion and a bronze medalist at the 1999 Pan American Games. He then went on to represent Mexico at the 2000 Summer Olympics, where he was defeated in the first round by Ukraine's Volodymyr Sydorenko.

=== WBO junior featherweight champion ===
On October 29, 2005 he defeated Sod Kokietgym by unanimous decision, handing Looknongyangtoy his first career loss. He has defended his WBO junior featherweight title eight times against Gerson Guerrero, Reynaldo Lopez, Sod Kokietgym twice, Al Seeger, Gerry Peñalosa, Rey Bautista and Eduardo Escobedo. Ponce de León's first loss was a unanimous decision loss to Celestino Caballero on February 17, 2005.

Ponce de León retained his title against Eduardo Escobedo on December 8, 2007 via unanimous decision, as part of the undercard of the Floyd Mayweather Jr.–Ricky Hatton fight. On June 7, 2008 Ponce de León was defeated by technical knockout in the first round by Juan Manuel López, losing his WBO Super Bantamweight title.

Ponce de León was the headliner of a sold out Golden Boy show and inched closer to another world title shot by knocking out Puerto Rican, Orlando Cruz. Ponce de León defeated Cornelius Lock on May 1, 2010 the undercard of Floyd Mayweather Jr. vs. Shane Mosley in the MGM Grand Garden Arena on HBO PPV to retain his WBC Latino featherweight title.

=== Super featherweight contention ===
On March 5, 2011, Ponce de León moved up to the super featherweight division to face undefeated prospect Adrien Broner. The fight was expected to be a showcase bout for the younger and larger Broner, however, Ponce de León proved to be more competitive than anticipated as Broner was awarded a highly disputed ten round unanimous decision.

=== WBC featherweight champion ===
In an upset, Ponce de León emerged victorious over WBC featherweight champion Jhonny Gonzalez, coming away with an eighth-round unanimous technical decision victory before a sold-out crowd at a Showtime-televised event at the MGM Grand.

The bout ended when a nasty gash emerged over the right eye of Gonzalez (52–8, 45 KOs), of Mexico City, after which it was determined that Gonzalez could not continue, they went to the scorecards and he won via: 79–72, 79–72, 77–74, all for Ponce de León. Ponce de León fought Abner Mares in the Mayweather-Guerrero undercard on May 4, 2013 and got knocked down in the second and ninth rounds en route to a TKO loss at 2:20 of the ninth round, losing his WBC featherweight title in the process.

== Professional boxing record ==
52 fights	45 wins	7 losses
By knockout	35	4
By decision	10	3

No.	Result	Record	Opponent	Type	Round, time	Date	Location	Notes
52	Loss	45–7	Miguel Roman	TKO	9 (10), 1:50	Jun 7, 2014	Estadio de Béisbol, Ciudad Cuauhtémoc, Mexico	For vacant WBC–USNBC Silver super featherweight title
51	Loss	45–6	Juan Manuel López	TKO	2 (10), 2:42	Mar 15, 2014	Coliseo Roberto Clemente, San Juan	For vacant WBO International super featherweight title
50	Win	45–5	Joksan Hernandez	UD	10	Nov 16, 2013	Grand Oasis, Cancún, Mexico	
49	Loss	44–5	Abner Mares	TKO	9 (12), 2:20	May 4, 2013	MGM Grand Garden Arena, Paradise, Nevada, U.S.	Lost WBC featherweight title
48	Win	44–4	Jhonny González	TD	8 (12), 2:36	Sep 15, 2012	MGM Grand Garden Arena, Paradise, Nevada, U.S.	Won WBC featherweight title; Unanimous TD after González was cut from an accidental head clash
47	Win	43–4	Eduardo Lazcano	UD	10	May 4, 2012	The Joint, Paradise, Nevada, U.S.	Won vacant WBC–USNBC super featherweight title
46	Win	42–4	Omar Estrella	KO	6 (12), 1:31	Jan 21, 2012	La Bodega del Boxeo, Ensenada, Mexico	Won vacant WBC–USNBC featherweight title
45	Loss	41–4	Yuriorkis Gamboa	TD	8 (12), 1:24	Sep 10, 2011	Boardwalk Hall, Atlantic City, New Jersey, U.S.	Unanimous TD after Ponce de León was cut from an accidental head clash
44	Loss	41–3	Adrien Broner	UD	10	Mar 5, 2011	Honda Center, Anaheim, California, U.S.	For vacant WBO Inter-Continental super featherweight title
43	Win	41–2	Sergio Manuel Medina	TKO	7 (10), 2:59	Dec 4, 2010	Estadio Universitario Beto Ávila, Veracruz, Mexico	
42	Win	40–2	Antonio Escalante	KO	3 (12), 2:40	Sep 18, 2010	Staples Center, Los Angeles, California, U.S.	
41	Win	39–2	Cornelius Lock	UD	10	May 1, 2010	MGM Grand Garden Arena, Paradise, Nevada, U.S.	Retained WBC Latino featherweight title
40	Win	38–2	Orlando Cruz	KO	3 (12), 2:37	Feb 20, 2010	El Plaza Condesa, Mexico City, Mexico	Won vacant WBC Latino featherweight title
39	Win	37–2	Roinet Caballero	UD	12	Sep 5, 2009	Roberto Durán Arena, Panama City, Panama	
38	Win	36–2	Marlon Aguilar	UD	12	Apr 25, 2009	Arena Miguel Canto Solis, Cozumel, Mexico	Won vacant WBC-NABF featherweight title
37	Win	35–2	Damian Marchiano	KO	4 (10), 1:41	Nov 1, 2008	Gymnasio Manuel Bernardo Aguirre, Chihuahua City, Mexico	
36	Loss	34–2	Juan Manuel López	TKO	1 (12), 2:25	Jun 7, 2008	Boardwalk Hall, Atlantic City, New Jersey, U.S.	Lost WBO super bantamweight title
35	Win	34–1	Eduardo Escobedo	UD	12	Dec 8, 2007	MGM Grand Garden Arena, Paradise, Nevada, U.S.	Retained WBO super bantamweight title
34	Win	33–1	Reynaldo Lopez	KO	5 (10), 2:39	Sep 28, 2007	Morongo Casino Resort & Spa, Cabazon, California, U.S.	Retained WBO super bantamweight title
33	Win	32–1	Rey Bautista	TKO	1 (12), 2:30	Aug 11, 2007	ARCO Arena, Sacramento, California, U.S.	Retained WBO super bantamweight title
32	Win	31–1	Gerry Peñalosa	UD	12	Mar 17, 2007	Mandalay Bay Events Center, Paradise, Nevada, U.S.	Retained WBO and IBA super bantamweight titles
31	Win	30–1	Al Seeger	TKO	8 (12), 1:43	Oct 21, 2006	Williams Convention Center, El Paso, Texas, U.S.	Retained WBO super bantamweight title; Won IBA super bantamweight title
30	Win	29–1	Sod Kokietgym	KO	1 (12), 0:52	Jul 15, 2006	MGM Grand Garden Arena, Paradise, Nevada, U.S.	Retained WBO super bantamweight title
29	Win	28–1	Gerson Guerrero	KO	2 (12), 1:50	May 27, 2006	Home Depot Center, Carson, California, U.S.	Retained WBO super bantamweight title
28	Win	27–1	Sod Kokietgym	UD	12	Oct 29, 2005	Desert Diamond Casino, Tucson, Arizona, U.S.	Won vacant WBO super bantamweight title
27	Win	26–1	Phillip Payne	TKO	7 (12), 0:57	Jun 24, 2005	The Show Palace, Oceanside, California, U.S.	Won vacant WBO–NABO super bantamweight title
26	Win	25–1	Ricardo Barajas	KO	2 (10), 2:13	Apr 29, 2005	Entertainment Center, Laredo, Texas, U.S.	
25	Loss	24–1	Celestino Caballero	UD	12	Feb 17, 2005	Avalon Hollywood, Los Angeles, California, U.S.	
24	Win	24–0	Julio Gamboa	KO	4 (10), 2:04	Nov 19, 2004	Desert Diamond Casino, Tucson, Arizona, U.S.	Retained WBO–NABO super bantamweight title
23	Win	23–0	Emmanuel Lucero	KO	3 (12), 2:51	Oct 22, 2004	County Coliseum, El Paso, Texas, U.S.	Won vacant WBO–NABO super bantamweight title
22	Win	22–0	Carlos Contreras	UD	10	Jun 11, 2004	Sundance Square, Fort Worth, Texas, U.S.	
21	Win	21–0	Anthony Martinez	TKO	7 (10), 1:15	Apr 17, 2004	Activity Center, Maywood, California, U.S.	
20	Win	20–0	Ivan Alvarez	TKO	5 (10), 2:02	Mar 19, 2004	Grand Olympic Auditorium, Los Angeles, California, U.S.	
19	Win	19–0	Cesar Figueroa	TKO	6 (10), 2:12	Feb 26, 2004	Sports Arena, San Diego, California, U.S.	
18	Win	18–0	Jesus Salvador Perez	TKO	1 (10), 2:45	Jan 16, 2004	Dodge Arena, Hidalgo, Texas, U.S.	
17	Win	17–0	Carlos Duran	TKO	3	Nov 20, 2003	Mexico	
16	Win	16–0	Marcos Badillo	KO	3 (8), 1:58	Sep 18, 2003	Santa Ana Stadium, Santa Ana, California, U.S.	
15	Win	15–0	Francisco Tejedor	TKO	1 (8), 3:00	Aug 28, 2003	Marriott Hotel, Irvine, California, U.S.	
14	Win	14–0	Missael Nunez	TKO	4 (6), 1:14	Jul 19, 2003	Activities Center, Maywood, California, U.S.	
13	Win	13–0	Trinidad Mendoza	TKO	2 (10)	Feb 22, 2003	Plaza de Toros México, Mexico City, Mexico	Retained WBC Youth bantamweight title
12	Win	12–0	Idelfonso Martinez	TKO	3 (10)	Aug 17, 2002	Santa Ana Star Casino, Santa Ana Pueblo, New Mexico, U.S.	Won WBC Youth bantamweight title
11	Win	11–0	Manuel Castro	KO	1 (10), 1:31	Aug 2, 2002	Centro de Espectaculos Corona, Ciudad Juárez, Mexico	
10	Win	10–0	Julio Cesar Avila	TKO	2 (10)	Jun 29, 2002	Arena México, Mexico City, Mexico	
9	Win	9–0	Miguel Ramirez	KO	1	Feb 23, 2002	Mexico	
8	Win	8–0	Terry Evans	KO	2	Dec 15, 2001	Ensenada, Mexico	
7	Win	7–0	Victor Manuel Barreto	KO	1 (10), 1:44	Nov 23, 2001	Salon Flamingos, Ciudad Cuauhtémoc, Mexico	
6	Win	6–0	Diego Andrade	KO	4	Nov 2, 2001	Gimnasio Rodrigo M. Quevedo, Chihuahua City, Mexico	
5	Win	5–0	Julio Luna	TKO	5 (6), 0:46	Sep 1, 2001	Don Haskins Center, El Paso, Texas, U.S.	
4	Win	4–0	Jesus Jimenez	TKO	1 (4), 2:45	Jul 21, 2001	Feather Falls Casino & Lodge, Oroville, California, U.S.	
3	Win	3–0	Ernesto Rivera	TKO	3	May 18, 2001	Estadio de la Victoria, Ciudad Juárez, Mexico	
2	Win	2–0	Victor Rodriguez	TKO	1 (4)	May 1, 2001	Mexico	
1	Win	1–0	Servando Solis	TKO	1 (10)	Mar 31, 2001	Poliforo Juan Gabriel, Ciudad Juárez, Mexico	

== Exhibition boxing record ==
1 fight	0 wins	0 losses
Non-scored	1	

No.	Result	Record	Opponent	Type	Round, time	Date	Location	Notes
1	—N/a	0–0 (1)	Marco Antonio Barrera	—N/a	6	Nov 20, 2021	Inn of the Mountain Gods, Mescalero, New Mexico, U.S.	Non-scored bout

== Titles in boxing ==
=== Major world titles ===
- WBO super bantamweight champion (122 lbs)
- WBC featherweight champion (126 lbs)

=== Minor world titles ===
- IBA super bantamweight champion (122 lbs)

=== Regional/International titles ===
- WBC Youth bantamweight champion (118 lbs)
- WBO-NABO super bantamweight champion (122 lbs) (2x)
- WBC-NABF featherweight champion (126 lbs)
- WBC Latino featherweight champion (126 lbs)
- WBC-USNBC featherweight champion (126 lbs)
- WBC-USNBC super featherweight champion (130 lbs)

== See also ==
- List of super bantamweight boxing champions
- List of featherweight boxing champions
- List of WBO world champions
- List of WBC world champions
- List of Mexican boxing world champions

Sporting positions
Regional boxing titles
Preceded by Idelfonso Martinez	WBC Youth bantamweight champion August 17, 2002 – July 2003; Vacated	Vacant Title next held by Alejandro Valdez
Vacant Title last held by Jorge Lacierva	WBO–NABO super bantamweight champion October 22, 2004 – February 2005; Vacated	Vacant Title next held by Himself
Vacant Title last held by Himself	WBO–NABO super bantamweight champion June 24, 2005 – September 2005; Vacated	Vacant Title next held by Steven Luevano
Vacant Title last held by Ricardo Castillo	NABF featherweight champion April 25, 2009 – September 2009; Vacated	Vacant Title next held by Matt Remillard
Vacant Title last held by Renan Acosta	WBC Latino featherweight champion February 20, 2010 – August 2010; Vacated	Vacant Title next held by Gregorio Torres
Vacant Title last held by Luis Cruz	WBC–USNBC featherweight champion January 21, 2012 – May 2012; Vacated	Vacant Title next held by Romulo Koasicha
Vacant Title last held by Adrien Broner	WBC–USNBC super featherweight champion May 4, 2012 – September 2012; Vacated	Vacant Title next held by Brandon Bennett
Minor world boxing titles
Vacant Title last held by Al Seeger	IBA super bantamweight champion October 21, 2006 – August 2007; Vacated	Title discontinued
Major world boxing titles
Vacant Title last held by Joan Guzmán	WBO super bantamweight champion October 29, 2005 – June 7, 2008	Succeeded by Juan Manuel López
Preceded by Jhonny González	WBC featherweight champion September 15, 2012 – May 4, 2013	Succeeded by Abner Mares
