= Billy Dib =

Australian boxer (born 1985)

Personal information
- Nickname: Billy the Kid
- Nationality: Australian
- Born: Bilal Dib; 17 August 1985 (age 41) Kogarah, Sydney, Australia
- Height: 171 cm (5 ft 7 in)
- Weight: Featherweight; Super-featherweight; Lightweight; Welterweight
- Website: billydib.com

Boxing career
- Reach: 179 cm (70 in)
- Stance: Orthodox

Boxing record
- Total fights: 56
- Wins: 48
- Win by KO: 27
- Losses: 6
- No contests: 2

Bilal Dib (born 17 August 1985), known as Billy Dib, is an Australian professional boxer. He held the IBF featherweight title from 2011 to 2013, and the IBO super-featherweight title in 2008.

== Early years ==
Dib was born on 17 August 1985 at Kogarah Hospital in Sydney. He has suffered from chronic asthma since birth, and he spent the first six months of his life in an incubator fighting the ailment. He took up boxing at the age of 12 to try to overcome the condition. His parents had emigrated to Australia from Lebanon, and owned a small greengrocer store in Engadine, where he grew up.

He is brothers to professional boxer, Youssef, and New South Wales Labor MP, Jihad.

== Amateur career ==
After starting boxing at the age of 12 at the local Police and Community Youth Club (PCYC), he soon began appearing in amateur competitions, winning 98 out of 113 bouts. During this period he was the Australian Champion on three occasions, and he was selected to train at the Australian Institute of Sport (AIS). However, his preparation for the 2004 Olympic Games was hindered by a motorcycle accident, and he was not selected for the Australian team. He subsequently turned down an offer to join Lebanon's Olympic team, arguing that he had been representing Australia and would not feel right if drawn against an Australian in the tournament as Australia was his, and his family's home.

After missing out on the Olympics Dib traveled to Sheffield to train with Prince Naseem Hamed, who encouraged him to turn professional.

== Professional career ==
Dib's first professional fight was against Chad Roy Naidu in August 2004, as an 18-year-old. He won, and subsequently went on to win the next 20 bouts, not losing until October 2008, against Steven Luevano. Dib traveled to the United States in 2006, after being offered the opportunity to train with Mike Tyson. While there he met Shane Mosley, and this led to Dib signing with Golden Boy Promotions.

=== IBO super-featherweight title challenge ===
On 30 July 2008, Billy Dib faced South African Zolani Marali for the IBO super featherweight title. Although Marali had a greater reach, and despite being knocked down in the third round, Dib was able to win on a unanimous points decision (116–114, 116–112 and 114–113), allowing him to capture the title.

=== WBO featherweight title challenge ===
Billy Dib fought against Steven Luevano, the WBO featherweight champion, on 18 October 2008. He was unsuccessful, losing to Luevano in a unanimous points decision. After the match Dib announced that he would come back as a better boxer, stating that he would learn from the experience.

=== Return after first loss ===
On Wednesday, 11 March 2009, at the Campbelltown Cube in Sydney, Dib returned to the ring in a spectacular performance, beating 22-year-old local Campbelltown fighter undefeated Davey Browne Jnr via an 8th round technical decision after Browne was cut above both eyes. The first cut opened after an accidental head clash, while the second came from a clean punch. The fight was stopped on the first cut and went to the scorecards.

On 9 July 2009, Billy Dib and Kenichi Yamaguchi were the main event on One HD's first Superboxer promotion. After being knocked down during the opening stages of the first round, Dib rallied late in the piece to down Yamaguchi. While Yamaguchi was on his knees, Dib hit him with a late left-handed punch, and although Yamaguchi returned to his feet, he appeared unsteady, leading the referee to stop the fight at 2:59 seconds of the first round in Dib's favour. As Yamaguchi protested the call to the referee Dib without reason shoved Yamaguchi as well as his trainer sparking a small brawl between the two corners.

Questions regarding the decision were raised after the fight, with some expressing the belief that the punch constituted a foul, and thus Yamaguchi should either have been given time to recover, the fight declared a no-contest, or Dib should have been disqualified.

Subsequently, the NSW Boxing Authority announced that they are undertaking an investigation into the events, and at their monthly board meeting on 4 August, the officials determined to change the result to a no-contest.

=== IBF featherweight champion ===
After nine straight victories, in July 2011 Dib took on longtime contender Jorge Lacierva and captured the IBF Featherweight belt via Unanimous Decision. Occasionally getting involved in a few lively and engaging exchanges, out-boxing his smaller opponent.

On 19 November 2011, Billy made the first defense of his title, knocking out Italian challenger Alberto Servidei in 2:38 of the first round from a left hook to the body.

Dib made his second title defense against Eduardo Escobedo on 7 March 2012 in retaining his title with a seventh-round TKO, his aggressive body attack broke down Escobedo who did not come out for round seven.

He lost the title to Evgeny Gradovich on 1 March 2013. A rematch between the two was scheduled for 23 November 2013, when Evgeny Gradovich won by TKO in the 9th round.

==== Dib vs. Farmer ====
On 3 August 2018, Dib fought Tevin Farmer for the vacant IBF super featherweight championship. Farmer was ranked #4 by the IBF at the time. Farmer dominated Dib and dropped him once en route to a convincing unanimous decision win, 120–107, 119-108 and 118–109.

==== Dib vs. Khan ====
After a brief retirement following a loss to Tevin Farmer in 2018, Dib returned to the ring in August 2019, losing in a WBC welterweight title fight to Amir Khan. Dib lost via a fourth-round TKO. Khan was ranked #15 by the WBC at welterweight.

He has fought three times since his come back, twice in 2019, once in 2021.

== Professional boxing record ==
57 fights	49 wins	6 losses
By knockout	27	3
By decision	20	3
By disqualification	2	0
No contests	2	

No.	Result	Record	Opponent	Type	Round, time	Date	Location	Notes
57	Win	49–6 (2)	Atilla Kayabasi	UD	8	12 Dec 2024	Grand Elysée, Rotherbaum, Germany	
56	Win	48–6 (2)	Jacob Ng	DQ	6 (10), 2:32	19 Mar 2022	The Star Gold Coast, Broadbeach, Australia	Won IBF International and WBO Oriental lightweight title
55	Win	47–6 (2)	Joey Baylon	TKO	7 (10), 2:10	30 Jan 2021	Hurstville Entertainment Centre, Sydney, Australia	
54	Win	46–6 (2)	Van Thao Tran	UD	10	21 Dec 2019	Hurstville Entertainment Centre, Sydney, Australia	
53	Loss	45–6 (2)	Amir Khan	TKO	4 (12), 1:06	12 Jul 2019	King Abdullah Sports City, Jeddah, Saudi Arabia	For vacant WBC International welterweight title
52	Win	45–5 (2)	Fonluang Sor Singyu	KO	1 (8), 2:25	26 Apr 2019	Hurstville Entertainment Centre, Sydney, Australia	
51	Loss	44–5 (2)	Tevin Farmer	UD	12	3 Aug 2018	Technology Park, Sydney, Australia	For vacant IBF super featherweight title
50	Win	44–4 (2)	Rachamongkol Sor Pleonchit	KO	2 (8)	31 Dec 2017	Ambassador Hotel, Bangkok, Thailand	
49	Win	43–4 (2)	Khunkhiri Wor Wisaruth	UD	8	2 Dec 2017	Mediterranean House, Sydney, Australia	
48	NC	42–4 (2)	Yardley Armenta Cruz	NC	3 (8), 3:00	29 Jul 2017	Barclays Center, New York City, New York, U.S.	NC after Cruz cut from accidental head clash
47	Win	42–4 (1)	Emilio Norfat	TKO	1 (10), 0:52	16 Dec 2016	Emporium Function Centre, Sydney, Australia	
46	Win	41–4 (1)	Pharanpetch Tor Buamas	UD	12	3 Jun 2016	Emporium Function Centre, Sydney, Australia	Won vacant IBF Australasian super featherweight title
45	Win	40–4 (1)	Sukkasem Kietyongyuth	UD	8	26 Feb 2016	Emporium Function Centre, Sydney, Australia	
44	Loss	39–4 (1)	Takashi Miura	TKO	3 (12), 1:29	1 May 2015	Ōta General Gymnasium, Tokyo, Japan	For WBC super featherweight title
43	Win	39–3 (1)	Isaias Santos Sampaio	TKO	2 (12), 1:22	6 Dec 2014	Hurstville Entertainment Centre, Sydney, Australia	Won vacant PABA super featherweight title
42	Win	38–3 (1)	Ruben Manakane	KO	8 (10), 2:54	31 Oct 2014	Pavilion, Melbourne, Australia	
41	Win	37–3 (1)	Alberto Garza	UD	10	2 Jul 2014	Foxwoods Resort Casino, Ledyard, Connecticut, U.S.	
40	Loss	36–3 (1)	Evgeny Gradovich	TKO	9 (12), 1:10	24 Nov 2013	Cotai Arena, Macau	For IBF featherweight title
39	Win	36–2 (1)	Mike Oliver	MD	10	7 Jul 2013	Convention Center, Hartford, Connecticut, U.S.	
38	Loss	35–2 (1)	Evgeny Gradovich	SD	12	1 Mar 2013	MGM Grand at Foxwoods, Ledyard, Connecticut, U.S.	Lost IBF featherweight title
37	Win	35–1 (1)	Juan Antonio Rodríguez	UD	10	13 Jul 2012	Orion Function Centre, Sydney, Australia	
36	Win	34–1 (1)	Eduardo Escobedo	RTD	6 (12), 3:00	7 Mar 2012	Derwent Entertainment Centre, Hobart, Australia	Retained IBF featherweight title
35	Win	33–1 (1)	Alberto Servidei	KO	1 (12), 2:38	19 Nov 2011	Homebush Sports Centre, Sydney, Australia	Retained IBF featherweight title
34	Win	32–1 (1)	Jorge Lacierva	UD	12	29 Jul 2011	State Sports Centre, Sydney, Australia	Won vacant IBF featherweight title
33	Win	31–1 (1)	Ricky Sismundo	TKO	8 (8), 1:51	12 Mar 2011	WA Italian Club, Perth, Australia	
32	Win	30–1 (1)	Mick Shaw	KO	6 (8), 1:46	8 Dec 2010	Acer Arena, Sydney, Australia	
31	Win	29–1 (1)	Jack Asis	KO	4 (8), 2:18	15 Sep 2010	WIN Entertainment Centre, Wollongong, Australia	
30	Win	28–1 (1)	Ceferino Dario Labarda	TKO	6 (8), 0:01	2 Sep 2010	Le Montage, Sydney, Australia	
29	Win	27–1 (1)	Wacharakrit Senahan	KO	1 (12), 1:24	2 Jun 2010	WIN Entertainment Centre, Wollongong, Australia	Won vacant IBF Pan Pacific featherweight title
28	Win	26–1 (1)	Reynaldo Belandres	KO	6 (8), 1:40	8 Apr 2010	Le Montage, Sydney, Australia	
27	Win	25–1 (1)	Carlos Lopez	KO	6 (8), 1:28	6 Mar 2010	Sharkies Leagues Club, Sydney, Australia	
26	Win	24–1 (1)	Roel Mangan	UD	8	18 Dec 2009	Sharkies Leagues Club, Sydney, Australia	
25	Win	23–1 (1)	Flash Villacura	RTD	4 (8), 3:00	11 Oct 2009	Punchbowl Croatian Club, Sydney, Australia	
24	NC	22–1 (1)	Kenichi Yamaguchi	NC	1 (12), 2:59	9 Jul 2009	Luna Park, Sydney, Australia	Vacant WBO Asia Pacific interim featherweight title at stake; Originally a TKO win for Dib, later ruled an NC after incorrect referee call
23	Win	22–1	Davey Browne Jr.	TD	8 (10)	11 Mar 2009	Campbelltown Convention Centre, Sydney, Australia	Won IBF Pan Pacific Youth and WBC Youth interim featherweight titles; Split TD after Browne was cut from an accidental head clash
22	Loss	21–1	Steven Luevano	UD	12	18 Oct 2008	Boardwalk Hall, Atlantic City, New Jersey, U.S.	For WBO featherweight title
21	Win	21–0	Zolani Marali	UD	12	30 Jul 2008	Entertainment Centre, Newcastle, Australia	Won vacant IBO super featherweight title
20	Win	20–0	Rey Anton Olarte	TKO	3 (8), 2:33	27 Jun 2008	Campbelltown Catholic Club, Sydney, Australia	
19	Win	19–0	Leon Maratas	TKO	5 (8), 1:58	16 May 2008	Orion Function Centre, Sydney, Australia	
18	Win	18–0	Edgar Fabian Vargas	SD	10	22 Mar 2008	Morongo Casino Resort & Spa, Cabazon, California, U.S.	
17	Win	17–0	Rogers Mtagwa	UD	8	10 Nov 2007	Madison Square Garden, New York City, New York, U.S.	
16	Win	16–0	Jose Alberto Gonzalez	UD	8	5 May 2007	MGM Grand Garden Arena, Paradise, Nevada, U.S.	
15	Win	15–0	Carlos Contreras	UD	10	10 Feb 2007	Mandalay Bay Events Center, Paradise, Nevada, U.S.	
14	Win	14–0	Phillip Payne	UD	8	2 Dec 2006	St. Pete Times Forum, Tampa, Florida, U.S.	
13	Win	13–0	Feliciano Dario Azuaga	TKO	5 (10), 1:06	4 Aug 2006	Campbelltown Catholic Club, Sydney, Australia	Retained IBO Asia Pacific featherweight title
12	Win	12–0	Ruben Santillanosa	KO	4 (10), 2:32	23 Jun 2006	Blacktown RSL Club, Sydney, Australia	Won vacant IBO Asia Pacific featherweight title
11	Win	11–0	Ariel Omongos	TKO	1 (4), 2:47	17 May 2006	Football Stadium, Sydney, Australia	
10	Win	10–0	Imad Khamis	PTS	6	26 Nov 2005	Hallam FM Arena, Sheffield, England	
9	Win	9–0	Rey Martizano	TKO	1 (8), 2:47	7 Oct 2005	Campbelltown Catholic Club, Sydney, Australia	
8	Win	8–0	Jesar Ancajas	DQ	5 (10), 1:31	16 Sep 2005	Blacktown RSL Club, Sydney, Australia	Retained IBO Asia Pacific super-featherweight title
7	Win	7–0	Michael Kizza	KO	2 (10), 2:29	24 Aug 2005	Entertainment Centre, Sydney, Australia	Retained IBO Asia Pacific super-featherweight title
6	Win	6–0	Roberto Oyan	UD	12	24 Apr 2005	State Sports Centre, Sydney, Australia	Won vacant IBO Asia Pacific super-featherweight title
5	Win	5–0	John Min	KO	2 (10), 1:40	10 Dec 2004	Hurstville Entertainment Centre, Sydney, Australia	Won vacant Australian super-featherweight title
4	Win	4–0	Rolando Gerongco	UD	6	29 Oct 2004	State Sports Centre, Sydney, Australia	
3	Win	3–0	Kraisamut Hothaisong	KO	4 (6), 1:22	8 Oct 2004	Panthers World of Entertainment, Penrith, Australia	
2	Win	2–0	Binnu Singh	KO	3 (6)	17 Sep 2004	State Sports Centre, Sydney, Australia	
1	Win	1–0	Chad Roy Naidu	TKO	4 (4), 1:34	15 Aug 2004	State Sports Centre, Sydney, Australia	

== Media appearances ==
In 2022, Dib competed on the reality competition series The Challenge: Australia.

== Personal life ==
Billy is a practising Muslim and regularly features in fundraising events within the Muslim community.

In October 2022, he was diagnosed with stomach cancer which forced his early retirement from boxing. He was given a 23% chance of survival and doctors reportedly told him that he had 6 months to live. In 2025, he declared that he was cancer free.

Sporting positions
Regional boxing titles
Vacant Title last held by Ben Cruz	Australian super-featherweight champion 10 December 2004 – April 2005; Vacated	Vacant Title next held by Ahmed Elomar
New title	IBO Asia Pacific super-featherweight champion 24 April 2005 – May 2006; Vacated	Vacant Title next held by Allan Luxford
Vacant Title last held by Ahmed Elomar	IBO Asia Pacific featherweight champion 23 June 2006 – December 2006; Vacated	Vacant Title next held by Afrizal Cotto
Preceded by Davey Browne Jr.	IBF Pan Pacific Youth featherweight champion 11 March 2009 – July 2009; Vacated	Title discontinued
Preceded by Davey Browne Jr.	WBC Youth featherweight champion Interim title 11 March 2009 – October 2009; Vacated	Vacant Title next held by Davey Browne Jr.
Vacant Title last held by Surasak Makordae	IBF Pan Pacific featherweight champion 2 June 2010 – 29 July 2011; Won world title	Vacant Title next held by Aekkawee Kaewmanee
Vacant Title last held by Terdsak Kokietgym	PABA super-featherweight champion 6 December 2010 – May 2015; Vacated	Vacant Title next held by Corey McConnell
New title	IBF Australasian super-featherweight champion 3 June 2016 – August 2018; Vacated	Vacant
Minor world boxing titles
Vacant Title last held by Cassius Baloyi	IBO super-featherweight champion 30 July 2008 – October 2008; Vacated	Vacant Title next held by Zolani Marali
Major world boxing titles
Vacant Title last held by Yuriorkis Gamboa	IBF featherweight champion 29 July 2011 – 1 March 2013	Succeeded by Evgeny Gradovich
