= Takalani Ndlovu =

South African boxer

Personal information
- Nickname: Panther
- Born: Takalani Hyweth Ndlovu; 11 January 1978 (age 48) Soweto, Gauteng, South Africa
- Height: 5 ft 8 in (173 cm)
- Weight: Super bantamweight; Featherweight

Boxing career
- Stance: Orthodox

Boxing record
- Total fights: 44
- Wins: 34
- Win by KO: 19
- Losses: 10

Takalani Ndlovu (born 11 January 1978), is a South African former professional boxer.

== Pro career ==
Ndlovu turned professional in 1999 & compiled a record of 27–3 before unsuccessfully challenging world champion Steve Molitor, for the IBF super-bantamweight title. He would face Molitor in a rematch three year later in another losing effort. The following year he would face Molitor for a third time but this time would be successful & won the IBF super-bantamweight title

== Professional boxing record ==
44 fights	34 wins	10 losses
By knockout	19	1
By decision	15	9

No.	Result	Record	Opponent	Type	Round, time	Date	Location	Notes
44	Win	34–10	Lwandile Gugushe	TKO	4 (12)	2014-10-25	Cathcart, South Africa	Won vacant WBF International featherweight title
43	Loss	33–10	Mzonke Fana	UD	12 (12)	2013-09-21	Mdantsane Indoor Centre, Mdantsane, South Africa	
42	Loss	33–9	Jeffrey Mathebula	UD	12 (12)	2013-03-23	Carnival City, Brakpan, South Africa	
41	Loss	33–8	Alejandro López	UD	12 (12)	2012-10-27	County Coliseum, El Paso, Texas, U.S.	
40	Loss	33–7	Jeffrey Mathebula	SD	12 (12)	2012-03-24	Carnival City, Brakpan, South Africa	Lost IBF super-bantamweight title
39	Win	33–6	Giovanni Caro	SD	12 (12)	2011-10-29	Palenque de la Feria, Colima, Mexico	Retained IBF super-bantamweight title
38	Win	32–6	Steve Molitor	UD	12 (12)	2011-03-26	Nasrec Indoor Arena, Johannesburg, South Africa	Won IBF super-bantamweight title
37	Win	31–6	Jeffrey Mathebula	SD	12 (12)	2010-09-01	Carnival City, Brakpan, South Africa	
36	Loss	30–6	Steve Molitor	UD	12 (12)	2010-03-27	Casino Rama, Rama, Ontario, Canada	For vacant IBF super-bantamweight title
35	Win	30–5	Kiko Martínez	UD	12 (12)	2009-09-25	Nasrec Indoor Arena, Johannesburg, South Africa	
34	Win	29–5	Oscar Chauke	UD	12 (12)	2009-03-20	Graceland Hotel Casino, Secunda, South Africa	Won vacant WBF featherweight title
33	Loss	28–5	Fernando Beltrán Jr.	SD	12 (12)	2008-08-22	Sommet Center, Nashville, Tennessee, U.S.	For vacant IBO featherweight title
32	Win	28–4	Raymond Sermona	TKO	4 (8)	2008-02-02	Emperors Palace, Kempton Park, South Africa	
31	Loss	27–4	Steve Molitor	TKO	9 (12)	2007-07-14	Casino Rama, Rama, Ontario, Canada	For IBF super-bantamweight title
30	Win	27–3	Ricardo Castillo	SD	12 (12)	2006-12-01	Cicero Stadium, Cicero, Illinois, U.S.	Retained IBO super-bantamweight title
29	Win	26–3	Giovanni Andrade	KO	2 (12)	2006-05-25	Carnival City, Brakpan, South Africa	Retained IBO super-bantamweight title
28	Win	25–3	Fabio Daniel Oliva	KO	3 (12)	2006-04-21	Dover Downs Hotel & Casino, Dover, Delaware, U.S.	Retained IBO super-bantamweight title
27	Win	24–3	Armando Guerrero	UD	12 (12)	2005-11-04	Hammerstein Ballroom, New York City, New York, U.S.	Won vacant IBO super-bantamweight title
26	Win	23–3	Willie Mabasa	KO	3 (12)	2004-11-26	Carousel Casino, Hammanskraal, South Africa	Retained South African featherweight title
25	Win	22–3	Michael Matsunyane	KO	8 (12)	2004-04-24	Superbowl, Moses Kotane, South Africa	Retained South African featherweight title
24	Loss	21–3	Vuyani Bungu	SD	12 (12)	2004-02-07	Carnival City, Brakpan, South Africa	For vacant IBO featherweight title
23	Win	21–2	Luyolo Kotsana	KO	6 (12)	2003-11-25	Carousel Casino, Hammanskraal, South Africa	Retained South African featherweight title
22	Loss	20–2	Vuyani Bungu	SD	10 (10)	2003-05-31	Carnival City, Brakpan, South Africa	
21	Win	20–1	Anthony Martinez	UD	8 (8)	2003-03-08	Preussag Arena, Hanover, Germany	
20	Win	19–1	Edward Mpofu	MD	12 (12)	2002-10-26	Carnival City, Brakpan, South Africa	Retained South African featherweight title
19	Win	18–1	Solomzi Govuza	UD	12 (12)	2002-08-27	Carousel Casino, Hammanskraal, South Africa	Retained South African featherweight title
18	Win	17–1	Anthony Tshehla	KO	1 (12)	2002-05-31	Graceland Hotel Casino, Secunda, South Africa	Won South African featherweight title
17	Win	16–1	Mpho Mothiba	TKO	3 (8)	2002-02-06	Carousel Casino, Hammanskraal, South Africa	
16	Win	15–1	Nkosinathi Moholo	TKO	2 (8)	2001-06-02	Carnival City, Brakpan, South Africa	
15	Win	14–1	Danile Botman	UD	6 (6)	2001-04-22	Carnival City, Brakpan, South Africa	
14	Win	13–1	Silulami Dindile	TKO	1 (6)	2001-03-07	Carousel Casino, Hammanskraal, South Africa	
13	Win	12–1	Ebenezer Tumane	TKO	2 (6)	2001-01-24	Carousel Casino, Hammanskraal, South Africa	
12	Win	11–1	William Mpongo	UD	6 (6)	2000-11-14	Carnival City, Brakpan, South Africa	
11	Win	10–1	Jason Thomas	TKO	2 (6)	2000-10-06	Leisure Centre, Maidstone, England, U.K.	
10	Win	9–1	Mpho Mothiba	PTS	6 (6)	2000-09-03	Sundome Casino, Randburg, South Africa	
9	Win	8–1	Thabo May	TKO	1 (6)	2000-06-27	Carousel Casino, Hammanskraal, South Africa	
8	Win	7–1	Malcolm Klassen	PTS	6 (6)	2000-04-26	Carousel Casino, Hammanskraal, South Africa	
7	Win	6–1	Trevor Gouws	KO	1 (4)	2000-01-25	Carousel Casino, Hammanskraal, South Africa	
6	Win	5–1	Vhalinavho Matamela	KO	1 (4)	1999-11-23	Carousel Casino, Hammanskraal, South Africa	
5	Loss	4–1	Joshua Khoase	PTS	4 (4)	1999-10-26	Carousel Casino, Hammanskraal, South Africa	
4	Win	4–0	Johannes Grobler	TKO	3 (4)	1999-10-01	Teachers Training College, Pretoria, South Africa	
3	Win	3–0	William Mpongo	KO	1 (6)	1999-09-13	Carousel Casino, Hammanskraal, South Africa	
2	Win	2–0	Joshua Khoase	PTS	4 (4)	1999-07-03	Duduza Hall, Nigel, South Africa	
1	Win	1–0	Johnson Singwanda	TKO	4 (6)	1999-04-28	City Hall, Benoni, South Africa	

== See also ==
- List of world super-bantamweight boxing champions

Sporting positions
Regional boxing titles
Preceded by Anthony Tshehla	South African featherweight champion May 31, 2002 – 2005; Vacated	Vacant Title next held by Malcolm Klassen
Vacant Title last held by Sergio Lopez Garcia	WBF International featherweight champion October 25, 2014 – 2015; Retired	Vacant Title next held by John Vincent Moralde
Minor World boxing titles
Vacant Title last held by Thomas Mashaba	IBO super-bantamweight champion November 4, 2005 – 2007; Vacated	Vacant Title next held by Mike Oliver
Vacant Title last held by Ludumo Galada	World Boxing Foundation featherweight champion March 20, 2009 – March 26, 2011; Won world title	Vacant Title next held by Kamil Łaszczyk
Major World boxing titles
Preceded by Steve Molitor	IBF super-bantamweight champion March 26, 2011 – March 24, 2012	Succeeded by Jeffrey Mathebula
