= Celestino Caballero =

Panamanian boxer (born 1976)

Personal information
- Nicknames: Pelenchín; Towering Inferno
- Born: June 21, 1976 (age 50) Colón, Panama
- Height: 5 ft 11 in (180 cm)
- Weight: Super bantamweight; Featherweight; Super featherweight

Boxing career
- Reach: 73 1/2 in (187 cm)
- Stance: Orthodox

Boxing record
- Total fights: 43
- Wins: 37
- Win by KO: 24
- Losses: 6

Celestino Caballero (born June 21, 1976) is a Panamanian former professional boxer who competed from 1998 to 2014. He held world championships in two weight classes, including the unified WBA (Super) and IBF super bantamweight titles between 2006 and 2010, and the WBA (Regular) featherweight title from 2011 to 2012.

== Professional career ==
Caballero began boxing professionally in 1998. During the majority of his early career, Caballero won a number of minor regional championships: the Panamanian, WBA Fedecentro, WBA Fedelatin, WBO Latino, and NABA Super Bantamweight titles.

He had won the first four of his titles and had a record of 17-0 before losing by a third-round knockout to José Rojas on May 16, 2003.

Seven months later, Caballero won the vacant NABA title by defeating Giovanni Andrade. The fight, which was held in Coconut Creek, Florida, was Caballero's first one outside of Panama. In his next fight, back in Panama, Caballero was knocked down in the tenth round and lost the title by unanimous decision to Ricardo Cordoba on May 25, 2004.

On February 17, 2005, Caballero fought the then unbeaten and would-be world champion Daniel Ponce de León in Hollywood, California. Caballero, who was a heavy underdog, won the bout by unanimous decision.

On October 15, 2005, Caballero defeated Yober Ortega by unanimous decision for the WBA Super Bantamweight interim championship. He defended the title on February 4, 2006 against Roberto Bonilla. After knocking down Bonilla in the third and fifth rounds, Caballero won via TKO in the seventh.

One of his trainers was María Toto.

=== WBA super bantamweight champion ===
Caballero fought against WBA world Super Bantamweight champion Somsak Sithchatchawal in Sithchatchawal's native country of Thailand on October 4, 2006 in order to win the real WBA title. He won by TKO by knocking Sithchatchawal down three times in the third round—causing the referee to stop the bout. Caballero has defended the title five times with the last one being that he knocked out Elvis Meija in one round.

On November 21, 2008, Caballero knocked out the unbeaten IBF Super Bantamweight champion Steve Molitor in the 4th round at the Casino Rama, Ontario. With the victory, he added the IBF title with his WBA crown. Caballero won his first defense on both titles with a split decision win over Jeffery Mathebula on April 30, 2009. He defended the titles for second time on August 29 in the same year against Francisco Leal who conceded in the 8th round.

Caballero was stripped of his IBF title on February 5, 2010 for failing to have a defense against Takalani Ndlovu, his mandatory challenger in that sanctioning body, in a timely manner. On April 10, 2010, Caballero defeated Daud Yordan. After that fight Celestino expressed his high interest in fighting Cuban Gold Medalist Yuriorkis Gamboa but that fight failed to come off being unsuccessful in securing a fight at Featherweight. Celestino was able to schedule a fight with Junior Lightweight Jason Litzau at the MGM Grand Garden Arena in Las Vegas on the opening bout of the HBO Televised undercard of Juan Manuel Marquez vs. Michael Katsidis on November 27. Cabellero subsequently, lost that fight via unanimous decision.

Celestino Caballero has dropped from Junior Lightweight to Featherweight division for a career-high against Jonathan Victor Barros, champion in property of the WBA version of this division, which fight is dated for June 18, 2011 and to take place at Mendoza, Argentina.

The WBC final Featherweight eliminator ordered by the World Boxing Council between Caballero and the Romanian Viorel Simion (16-0, 7KOs), with the winner landing a shot at current champion Daniel Ponce de León, should have taken place on a date in spring 2013. The fight did not happen, however.

== Professional boxing record ==
| 43 fights | 37 wins | 6 losses |
|---|---|---|
| By knockout | 24 | 1 |
| By decision | 11 | 5 |
| By disqualification | 2 | 0 |

| No. | Result | Record | Opponent | Type | Round, time | Date | Location | Notes |
|---|---|---|---|---|---|---|---|---|
| 43 | Loss | 37–6 | Adrian Estrella | UD | 12 | Oct 4, 2014 | Centro de Usos Múltiples, Los Mochis, Mexico | For WBC FECARBOX super featherweight title |
| 42 | Win | 37–5 | Jimmy Aburto | TKO | 2 (8), 1:41 | Nov 30, 2013 | Arena Panama Al Brown, Colón, Panama | Won vacant WBC Latino featherweight title |
| 41 | Loss | 36–5 | Robinson Castellanos | SD | 12 | Apr 20, 2013 | Roberto Durán Arena, Panama City, Panama | For WBC Silver featherweight title |
| 40 | Win | 36–4 | Satoshi Hosono | UD | 12 | Dec 31, 2011 | Cultural Gymnasium, Yokohama, Japan | Retained WBA (Regular) featherweight title |
| 39 | Win | 35–4 | Jonathan Victor Barros | UD | 12 | Oct 14, 2011 | Estadio Luna Park, Buenos Aires, Argentina | Won WBA (Regular) featherweight title |
| 38 | Loss | 34–4 | Jonathan Victor Barros | SD | 12 | Jun 18, 2011 | Polideportivo La Colonia, Junín, Argentina | For WBA (Regular) featherweight title |
| 37 | Loss | 34–3 | Jason Litzau | SD | 10 | Nov 27, 2010 | MGM Grand Garden Arena, Paradise, Nevada, U.S. | |
| 36 | Win | 34–2 | Daud Yordan | UD | 12 | Apr 10, 2010 | BankAtlantic Center, Sunrise, Florida, U.S. | |
| 35 | Win | 33–2 | Francisco Leal | RTD | 7 (12), 3:00 | Aug 29, 2009 | Ciudad Deportiva, Mexicali, Mexico | Retained WBA (Unified) and IBF super bantamweight titles |
| 34 | Win | 32–2 | Jeffrey Mathebula | SD | 12 | Apr 30, 2009 | Roberto Durán Arena, Panama City, Panama | Retained WBA (Unified) and IBF super bantamweight titles |
| 33 | Win | 31–2 | Steve Molitor | TKO | 4 (12), 0:52 | Nov 21, 2008 | Casino, Rama, Ontario, Canada | Retained WBA (Unified) super bantamweight title; Won IBF super bantamweight title |
| 32 | Win | 30–2 | Elvis Mejia | TKO | 1 (12), 2:51 | Sep 18, 2008 | Figali Convention Center, Panama City, Panama | Retained WBA super bantamweight title |
| 31 | Win | 29–2 | Lorenzo Parra | RTD | 11 (12), 3:00 | Jun 7, 2008 | Centro Olimpico, San Juan de los Morros, Venezuela | Retained WBA super bantamweight title |
| 30 | Win | 28–2 | Mauricio Pastrana | TKO | 8 (12), 0:53 | Dec 1, 2007 | Roberto Durán Arena, Panama City, Panama | Retained WBA super bantamweight title |
| 29 | Win | 27–2 | Jorge Lacierva | UD | 12 | Aug 4, 2007 | Dodge Arena, Hidalgo, Texas, U.S. | Retained WBA super bantamweight title |
| 28 | Win | 26–2 | Ricardo Castillo | DQ | 9 (12), 2:02 | Mar 16, 2007 | Hard Rock Live, Hollywood, Florida, U.S. | Retained WBA super bantamweight title; Castillo disqualified after his corner entered ring |
| 27 | Win | 25–2 | Somsak Sithchatchawal | TKO | 3 (12), 1:48 | Oct 4, 2006 | Wat, Ban Rai, Thailand | Won WBA super bantamweight title |
| 26 | Win | 24–2 | Roberto Bonilla | TKO | 7 (12) | Feb 4, 2006 | Figali Convention Center, Panama City, Panama | Retained WBA interim super bantamweight title |
| 25 | Win | 23–2 | Yober Ortega | UD | 12 | Oct 15, 2005 | Figali Convention Center, Panama City, Panama | Won vacant WBA interim super bantamweight title |
| 24 | Win | 22–2 | José Luis Valbuena | TKO | 5 (12), 3:08 | May 5, 2005 | Desert Diamond Casino, Tucson, Arizona, U.S. | |
| 23 | Win | 21–2 | Daniel Ponce de León | UD | 12 | Feb 17, 2005 | Avalon Hollywood, Los Angeles, California, U.S. | |
| 22 | Win | 20–2 | Victor Peralta | TKO | 5 (10) | Oct 15, 2004 | Coliseo Bernardo Caraballo, Cartagena, Colombia | |
| 21 | Loss | 19–2 | Ricardo Cordoba | UD | 12 | May 25, 2004 | Atlapa Convention Centre, Panama City, Panama | Lost WBA–NABA and Panamanian super bantamweight titles |
| 20 | Win | 19–1 | Giovanni Andrade | DQ | 10 (10) | Dec 5, 2003 | Seminole Casino, Coconut Creek, Florida, U.S. | Won vacant WBA–NABA super bantamweight title |
| 19 | Win | 18–1 | Arcelio Ibarra | TKO | 3 (10), 2:18 | Sep 20, 2003 | Jardín Nuevas Glorias Soberanas, Panama City, Panama | |
| 18 | Loss | 17–1 | Jose Rojas | KO | 3 (12), 2:59 | May 16, 2003 | Roberto Durán Arena, Panama City, Panama | Lost WBA Fedelatin super bantamweight title |
| 17 | Win | 17–0 | Leonardo Gonzalez | TKO | 2 (12), 0:57 | Feb 15, 2003 | Roberto Durán Arena, Panama City, Panama | Retained WBA Fedelatin and WBO Latino super bantamweight titles |
| 16 | Win | 16–0 | Jorge Monsalvo | TKO | 4 (12) | Oct 31, 2002 | Atlapa Convention Centre, Panama City, Panama | Won vacant WBO Latino super bantamweight title |
| 15 | Win | 15–0 | Angel Valencia | KO | 3 (12), 1:45 | Sep 21, 2002 | Arena Panama Al Brown, Colón, Panama | Retained Panamanian super bantamweight title; Won vacant WBA Fedelatin super bantamweight title |
| 14 | Win | 14–0 | Andres Ciriaco | UD | 8 | Jun 14, 2002 | Arena Panama Al Brown, Colón, Panama | |
| 13 | Win | 13–0 | Marcos Verbel | KO | 3 (12), 2:47 | Nov 30, 2001 | Riande Continental Hotel Bella Vista, Panama City, Panama | Won vacant WBA Fedecentro super bantamweight title |
| 12 | Win | 12–0 | Euclides Espitia | KO | 4 (10), 2:14 | Oct 5, 2001 | Roberto Durán Arena, Panama City, Panama | |
| 11 | Win | 11–0 | Armando Rojas | TKO | 7 (12) | Aug 18, 2001 | Arena Panama Al Brown, Colón, Panama | Retained Panamanian super bantamweight title; Won vacant WBA Fedecentro super bantamweight title |
| 10 | Win | 10–0 | Santos Marimon | KO | 6 (10), 0:32 | Mar 17, 2001 | Arena Panama Al Brown, Colón, Panama | |
| 9 | Win | 9–0 | Antonio Jaramillo | TKO | 2 (10), 1:39 | Feb 3, 2001 | Gimnasio Nuevo Panama, Panama City, Panama | |
| 8 | Win | 8–0 | Armando Cordoba | UD | 12 | Jun 16, 2000 | Gimnasio Nuevo Panama, Panama City, Panama | Won Panamanian super bantamweight title |
| 7 | Win | 7–0 | Arquimedes Gonzalez | KO | 4 (8), 1:48 | Apr 29, 2000 | Gimnasio, Puerto Pilón, Panama | |
| 6 | Win | 6–0 | Raul Alonso | RTD | 5 (8), 3:00 | Mar 31, 2000 | Jardin "El Rancho", Panama City, Panama | |
| 5 | Win | 5–0 | Henry Francis | UD | 6 | Feb 16, 2000 | Magnum Eventus, Panama City, Panama | |
| 4 | Win | 4–0 | Garibaldo Morris | KO | 1 (6), 3:00 | Mar 3, 1999 | Discoteca Congo, Panama City, Panama | |
| 3 | Win | 3–0 | Leopoldo Arrocha | TKO | 3 (4), 2:39 | Jan 20, 1999 | Discoteca Congo, Panama City, Panama | |
| 2 | Win | 2–0 | Arquimedes Gonzalez | RTD | 3 (4), 3:00 | Dec 2, 1998 | Discoteca Congo, Panama City, Panama | |
| 1 | Win | 1–0 | Victor Perez | UD | 4 | Nov 18, 1998 | Discoteca Congo, Panama City, Panama | |

Sporting positions
Regional boxing titles
| Preceded by Armando Cordoba | Panamanian super bantamweight champion June 16, 2000 – May 25, 2004 | Succeeded by Ricardo Cordoba |
| Vacant Title last held by Humberto Soto | WBA Fedecentro super bantamweight champion August 18, 2001 – October 2001; Vacated | Vacant Title next held by Óscar Larios |
| Vacant Title last held by Óscar Larios | WBA Fedecentro super bantamweight champion November 30, 2001 – September 21, 2002; Won Fedelatin title | Vacant Title next held by Jose Rojas |
| Vacant Title last held by Anthony Martinez | WBA Fedelatin super bantamweight champion September 21, 2002 – May 16, 2003 | Succeeded by Jose Rojas |
| Vacant Title last held by Joan Guzmán | WBO Latino super bantamweight champion October 31, 2002 – May 2003; Vacated | Vacant Title next held by Oscar Rene Ponce |
| Vacant Title last held by Alejandro Barrera | WBA–NABA super bantamweight champion December 5, 2003 – May 25, 2004 | Succeeded by Ricardo Cordoba |
| Vacant Title last held by Jezreel Corrales | WBC Latino featherweight champion November 30, 2013 – April 2014; Vacated | Succeeded by Sergio Romero |
World boxing titles
| Vacant Title last held by Yober Ortega | WBA super bantamweight champion Interim title October 15, 2005 – October 4, 2006; Won full title | Vacant Title next held by Ricardo Cordoba |
| Preceded by Somsak Sithchatchawal | WBA super bantamweight champion October 4, 2006 – November 21, 2008; Won Super title | Succeeded by Ricardo Cordoba interim champion promoted |
| New title | WBA super bantamweight champion Super title November 21, 2008 – November 2010; Unified title from December 2008 to March 2010; Vacated | Vacant Title next held by Guillermo Rigondeaux |
| Preceded by Steve Molitor | IBF super bantamweight champion November 21, 2008 – February 10, 2010; Stripped | Vacant Title next held by Steve Molitor |
| Preceded by Jonathan Victor Barros | WBA featherweight champion Regular title October 14, 2011 – October 7, 2012; Vacated | Vacant Title next held by Nicholas Walters |
