= Jeffrey Mathebula =

South African boxer (born 1979)

Jeffrey Tutu Mathebula
Personal information
- Nickname: Mongoose
- Nationality: South African
- Born: Jeffrey Mathebula; 22 June 1979 (age 47) Malamulele, South Africa
- Height: 5 ft 10 in (178 cm)
- Weight: Super Bantamweight

Boxing career
- Stance: Orthodox

Boxing record
- Total fights: 34
- Wins: 27
- Win by KO: 14
- Losses: 5
- Draws: 2

Jeffrey Mathebula (born 22 June 1979) is a South African professional boxer who competed from 2001 to 2013. He held the IBF junior featherweight title in 2012.

== Amateur career ==
Mathebula competed for his native country at the 2000 Summer Olympics in Sydney in the Men's Featherweight division, where he defeated Noureddine Madjhoud in the first round and lost to Bekzat Sattarkhanov in the second round. He finished his amateur career with a record of 101–4.

== Professional career ==
Mathebula made his professional debut on 17 February 2001, and has been managed and trained by Nick Durandt and promoted by Branco Sports Promotions. He fought to a draw with Malcolm Klassen in a six-round bout in Temba, North West in September 2004.

Mathebula defeated Julio Zarate via a unanimous decision with the scores of 117–109 twice and 118–109 in an IBF super bantamweight title eliminator in Temba on 29 August 2008, after knocking him down twice in the tenth-round. He was supposed to challenge the then IBF super bantamweight champion Steve Molitor, but Molitor lost to Celestino Caballero. Hence, Mathebula fought against Caballero for the WBA Super World and IBF World super bantamweight title. However, he lost his first world title shot against Caballero via a split decision at the Roberto Duran Arena in Panama on 30 April 2009.

After losing to Takalani Ndlovu via a split decision in an IBF junior featherweight title eliminator in Brakpan, Gauteng in September 2010, Mathebula defeated Ndlovu via a split decision in their rematch in Brakpan to be crowned the IBF junior featherweight champion. It was the SABC-televised first boxing event after one year interruption.

== Mathebula v. Donaire ==
In one of the more defining and memorable fights, Mathebula fought the hard-hitting, WBO Super Bantamweight Champion Nonito Donaire (29–1 18 KO's). Donaire is rated by The Ring as the number five pound-for-pound boxer in the world. It was a unification fight for IBF and WBO Super Bantamweight belts. The bout was Live on HBO Boxing After Dark on 7 July 2012 at The Home Depot Center in Carson, California. Donaire defeated Methebula by unanimous decision. Donaire knocked Mathebula down in round four, breaking his jaw in two places.

== Professional boxing record ==
| 34 fights | 27 wins | 5 losses |
|---|---|---|
| By knockout | 14 | 2 |
| By decision | 13 | 3 |
| Draws | 2 | |

| No. | Result | Record | Opponent | Type | Round, time | Date | Location | Notes |
|---|---|---|---|---|---|---|---|---|
| 34 | Loss | 27–5–2 | Kiko Martínez | KO | 9 (12), 2:05 | 21 Dec 2013 | Pabellón Esperanza Lag, Elche, Spain | For IBF super bantamweight title |
| 33 | Win | 27–4–2 | Takalani Ndlovu | UD | 12 | 23 Mar 2013 | Carnival City Casino, Brakpan, South Africa | |
| 32 | Loss | 26–4–2 | Nonito Donaire | UD | 12 | 7 Jul 2012 | Home Depot Center, Carson, California, U.S. | Lost IBF super bantamweight title; For WBO super bantamweight title |
| 31 | Win | 26–3–2 | Takalani Ndlovu | SD | 12 | 24 Mar 2012 | Carnival City Casino, Brakpan, South Africa | Won IBF super bantamweight title |
| 30 | Win | 25–3–2 | Oscar Chauke | SD | 12 | 11 Jun 2011 | Carnival City, Brakpan, South Africa | |
| 29 | Win | 24–3–2 | Siviwe Hasheni | TKO | 2(8) | 30 Oct 2010 | Mafikeng University Hall, Mafikeng, South Africa | |
| 28 | Loss | 23–3–2 | Takalani Ndlovu | SD | 12 | 1 Sep 2010 | Carnival City, Brakpan, South Africa | |
| 27 | Win | 23–2–2 | Rashid Ally | KO | 4 (6) | 20 Nov 2009 | Wembley Arena, Johannesburg, South Africa | |
| 26 | Loss | 22–2–2 | Celestino Caballero | SD | 12 | 30 Apr 2009 | Arena Roberto Duran, Panama City, Panama | For WBA (Super) and IBF super bantamweight title |
| 25 | Win | 22–1–2 | Julio Zarate | UD | 12 | 29 Aug 2008 | Carousel Hotel & Casino, Temba, South Africa | |
| 24 | Win | 21–1–2 | Yoshinori Miyata | TKO | 8(12) | 22 Feb 2008 | Carousel Hotel & Casino, Temba, South Africa | Retained WBC International featherweight title |
| 23 | Win | 20–1–2 | Themba Tshicila | RTD | 11 (12), 3:00 | 29 Jun 2007 | Orient Theatre, East London, South Africa | Retained WBC International featherweight title |
| 22 | Win | 19–1–2 | Mkhuseli Kondile | KO | 2(10) | 8 Dec 2006 | Nasrec Indoor Arena, Johannesburg, South Africa | |
| 21 | Win | 18–1–2 | Aaron Melgarejo | UD | 12 | 30 Jun 2006 | Nasrec Indoor Arena, Johannesburg, South Africa | Retained WBC International featherweight title |
| 20 | Win | 17–1–2 | Osumanu Akaba | UD | 12 | 30 Sep 2005 | Graceland Hotel Casino, Secunda, South Africa | Won WBC International featherweight title |
| 19 | Win | 16–1–2 | Oscar Chauke | PTS | 6 | 15 Apr 2005 | Sunnypark Shopping Centre, Pretoria, South Africa | |
| 18 | Draw | 15–1–2 | Malcolm Klassen | PTS | 6 | 28 Sep 2004 | Carousel Hotel & Casino, Temba, South Africa | |
| 17 | Win | 15–1–1 | Elias Skhosana | PTS | 6 | 23 Jul 2004 | Carousel Hotel & Casino, Temba, South Africa | |
| 16 | Win | 14–1–1 | Sonwabo Matayi | PTS | 6 | 24 Feb 2004 | Carousel Casino, Hammanskraal, South Africa | |
| 15 | Loss | 13–1–1 | Thomas Mashaba | TKO | 6(12) | 30 Sep 2003 | Carousel Casino, Hammanskraal, South Africa | For vacant South African super bantamweight title |
| 14 | Win | 13–0–1 | Oupa Lubisi | TKO | 3 (12) | 31 May 2003 | Carousel Casino, Hammanskraal, South Africa | |
| 13 | Win | 12–0–1 | Bonani Hlwatika | UD | 12 | 15 Feb 2003 | Meropa Sun Casino, Polokwane, South Africa | Won IBO Inter-Continental super bantamweight title |
| 12 | Win | 11–0–1 | Petros Motsoahole | KO | 1 (6) | 22 Nov 2002 | Portuguese Hall, Johannesburg, South Africa | |
| 11 | Win | 10–0–1 | Martin Mnyandu | PTS | 6 | 5 Oct 2002 | Wembley Indoor Arena, Johannesburg, South Africa | |
| 10 | Draw | 9–0–1 | Bonani Hlwatika | PTS | 6 | 27 Aug 2002 | Carousel Casino, Hammanskraal, South Africa | |
| 9 | Win | 9–0 | Wladimir Borov | PTS | 6 | 15 May 2002 | Carnival City, Brakpan, South Africa | |
| 8 | Win | 8–0 | Ebenezer Tumane | TKO | 3 (6) | 27 Mar 2002 | Carousel Casino, Hammanskraal, South Africa | |
| 7 | Win | 7–0 | Molefe Benzane | TKO | 4 (8) | 6 Feb 2002 | Carousel Casino, Hammanskraal, South Africa | |
| 6 | Win | 6–0 | Koos Sibiya | KO | 2 (6) | 24 Oct 2001 | Carousel Casino, Hammanskraal, South Africa | |
| 5 | Win | 5–0 | Dumisani Zulu | TKO | 1 (6) | 19 Sep 2001 | Ubuntu Kraal Resort, Soweto, South Africa | |
| 4 | Win | 4–0 | Takatso Hlahane | PTS | 4 | 22 Aug 2001 | Carousel Casino, Hammanskraal, South Africa | |
| 3 | Win | 3–0 | Tshumbedzo Tshishonge | KO | 3 (4) | 2 Jun 2001 | Carnival City, Brakpan, South Africa | |
| 2 | Win | 2–0 | Goodman Mavuso | TKO | 2 (4) | 9 May 2001 | Carnival City, Brakpan, South Africa | |
| 1 | Win | 1–0 | Tally Disoloane | KO | 3 (4) | 17 Feb 2001 | Carnival City, Brakpan, South Africa | |

| Preceded by Takalani Ndlovu | IBF Junior Featherweight Champion; 24 March 2012 – 7 July 2012 | Succeeded by Nonito Donaire |
