= Bernard Dunne =

Irish boxer

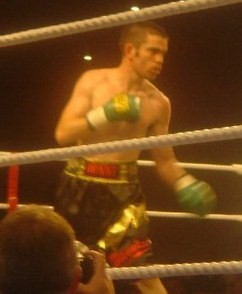

Personal information
- Nickname: The Dublin Dynamo
- Nationality: Irish
- Born: Bernard Dunne; 6 February 1980 (age 46) Clondalkin, Dublin, Ireland
- Height: 5 ft 7 in (1.70 m)
- Weight: Super Bantamweight

Boxing career
- Stance: Orthodox

Boxing record
- Total fights: 30
- Wins: 28
- Win by KO: 15
- Losses: 2
- Draws: 0
- No contests: 0

Bernard Dunne (born 6 February 1980) is an Irish former professional boxer and a former WBA (Regular), and European Super Bantamweight champion.

On Saturday 21 March 2009, Dunne defeated Ricardo Cordoba in the 11th round to become the WBA (Regular) super bantamweight champion in a fight that won ESPN's 2009 Fight of The Year with 6 knockdowns occurring in the fight between the two fighters (4 for Dunne and 2 for Cordoba). Dunne lost his title on 26 September 2009 in the 02 Dublin. Dunne retired on 19 February 2010.

In November 2009, Irish publishers Liberties Press released the first biography of Dunne. Entitled Bernard Dunne: The Ecstasy and the Agony, it is an up-to-date account of Dunne's beginnings until his defeat to Poonsawat Kratingdaenggym. In 2012, Dunne was an analyst on the 2012 Olympics boxing coverage on RTÉ Sport.

== Amateur career ==
Dunne was born in Neilstown, Clondalkin, County Dublin. He boxed at amateur level for Ireland where he had a record of 119–11, captured 13 Irish titles but did not qualify for the 2000 Summer Olympics in Sydney.

== Professional career ==
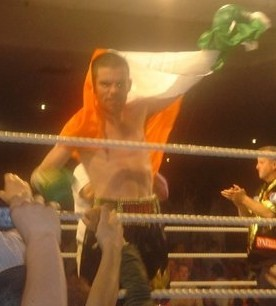
Dunne celebrates in Dublin

Dunne began his professional boxing career in December 2001 in the United States, winning his first fight in Feather Falls Casino in Oroville, California. In LA, Bernard trained under the world-renowned boxing coach Freddie Roach in the Wild Card Boxing Gym, training with many champions including Manny Pacquiao. Dunne won his first fourteen bouts in the United States before returning to Dublin under manager Brian Peters. Peters negotiated a deal with Irish public broadcaster RTÉ whereby Dunne's fights in Dublin would be shown live on national television. It was the first such deal for an Irish boxer.

Dunne won the lowly regarded IBC super bantamweight title by beating Sean Hughes in the National Stadium in Dublin. Dunne won the European Super bantamweight title on 11 November 2006 beating Esham Pickering on points in his home town of Dublin. In March 2007 he defended the title by technical knock-out over Yersin Jailauov in the third round, in a mandatory EBU title defence. He followed that streak in June 2007, when he defended his EBU title, defeating Walstad Reider by unanimous decision.

The EBU made Kiko Martínez the mandatory challenger for Dunne's European super bantamweight title. Martinez and Dunne clashed on 25 August 2007 at the Point Theatre, Dublin, Ireland. This was Martinez's first fight outside of Spain. On the night of the fight the Point Depot filled with expectant Irish boxing fans and the fight was beamed live on RTÉ, the Irish national television broadcaster. The fight started with Dunne keeping his guard low and circling Martinez. However, Martinez quickly had Dunne on the canvas with an overhand right. Dunne appeared stunned and unaware of what had happened. Dunne beat the count but was floored twice more before the referee stopped the fight within only 90 seconds of round one. The Martinez camp stated that they knew there would be a first round victory and that many of them had placed bets worth thousands of pounds with Irish bookmakers at odds of 66/1 that Martinez would win in the first round.

Dunne had next been scheduled to fight Marcos Jiménez 13–1 (8 KO) of the Dominican Republic at the National Stadium on 12 July 2008. However, his opponent pulled out of the fight. His replacement was Damian David Marchiano 15–4–1 (5 KO) of Argentina. Marchiano came into the bout on the back of an unsuccessful attempt at taking Silence Mabuza's IBO Bantamweight title. Dunne won the 10 round bout on points.

On 21 March 2009 Dunne faced off against Panamanian WBA Super Bantamweight world champion Ricardo Cordoba in the O_{2} Arena, Dublin. This was the first world boxing championship fight in Dublin for 13 years and would win ESPN's Fight of the Year. Dunne went on to win in a thrilling fight knocking Cordoba out in the 11th round marking the end to a historic day for Irish sports as the international rugby team had won a Six Nations Grand Slam earlier in the day. Jimmy Magee pointed out that 61 years previously Ireland won a Six Nations Grand Slam and a Boxing World Title on the same day. On 10 April 2009 Dunne was crowned boxer of the month for March by the World Boxing Association.

In May 2009, Dunne was offered £200,000 by promoter Frank Maloney to defend his world title against Commonwealth Super-Bantamweight holder Rendall Munroe, but Dunne said no. On 20 August 2009, it was confirmed that Dunne would make the first defence of his World title at The O2 Arena, Dublin on 26 September 2009 against the number one rated contender Poonsawat Kratingdaenggym. Dunne subsequently lost his belt to Poonsawat by way of the WBA three knockdown rule in the third round of the fight.

In late January 2010 Dunne was named Boxer of the Year at the Irish National Boxing Awards. Three weeks later on 19 February he announced his retirement from the sport.

== International Championship Belts ==
Sanctioning Body and Weight Class	Defeated	Lost to	Years
International Boxing Council Super Bantamweight	Sean Hughes (boxer) (United Kingdom) (Vacant Title)	(Vacated)	2005
European Boxing Union Super Bantamweight	Reidar Walstad (Norway) (Vacant Title)	Kiko Martinez (Spain)	2007
World Boxing Association Super Bantamweight	Ricardo Cordoba (Panama)	Poonsawat Kratingdaenggym (Thailand)	2009

== Gaelic games involvement ==
Dunne worked with Davy Fitzgerald when Fitzgerald managed the Waterford county hurling team. Dunne was involved the Galway county hurling team's search for a new manager in 2021. When Fitzgerald's name was mentioned as a possibility, Dunne withdrew from the interview panel Galway had appointed to decide (the job was ultimately given to Henry Shefflin).

Dunne worked with Jim Gavin as the senior Dublin county football team's performance and lifestyle coach from 2013 onwards, having previously worked alongside Gavin with the county under-21 team. He left during the 2017 season.

Dunne joined the Galway county football team in 2022.

Sporting positions
World boxing titles
Preceded by Ricardo Cordoba	WBA super-bantamweight champion Regular title 21 March 2009 – 26 September 2009	Succeeded by Poonsawat Kratingdaenggym
