= Mashaba =

Mashaba may refer to:

- Mashava (formerly known as Mashaba), mining village in Masvingo Province, Zimbabwe
- Ephraim Mashaba (born 1950), South African football coach
- Herman Mashaba (born 1959), a Mayor of Johannesburg.
- Thomas Mashaba, South African is a featherweight professional boxer
