= Benjamín Flores (Mexian boxer) =

1. REDIRECT Benjamín Flores (Mexican boxer)
