= Esham Pickering =

British boxer (born 1976)

Personal information
- Nickname: Brown Sugar
- Nationality: British
- Born: Esham Pickering; 7 August 1976 (age 50) Newark, Nottinghamshire, England
- Height: 5 ft 5 in (1.65 m)
- Weight: Bantamweight; Super bantamweight; Featherweight

Boxing career
- Reach: 68 in (173 cm)
- Stance: Orthodox

Boxing record
- Total fights: 45
- Wins: 34
- Win by KO: 14
- Losses: 11
- Draws: 0

Esham Pickering (born 7 August 1976) is a British former professional boxer who competed from 1996 to 2014. He challenged once for the WBO bantamweight title in 2000. At regional level, he held the British super bantamweight title twice between 2003 and 2008; the Commonwealth super bantamweight title from 2003 to 2005; and the EBU European super bantamweight title from 2004 to 2005. He also challenged twice for the British featherweight title, in 1998 and 2008, and once for the EBU European featherweight title in 2009.

== Early career ==
Pickering started his professional career in September 1996, with a 1st round win over Brendan Bryce in Cleethorpes. By November 1997, he had compiled an unbeaten record of 11 wins against no defeats and had earned a shot at the full British featherweight title. He travelled to Sheffield to challenge holder Jon Jo Irwin in May 1998 and lasted the full 12 rounds in what was to be an unsuccessful attempt. The defeat to Irwin was to be his first as a professional.

== World Title Challenge ==
Pickering bounced back from his first career defeat to register six back to back wins including Chris Lyons, Marc Smith and Leeroy Williamson to line himself up for a shot at the World Boxing Organisation's version of the bantamweight title. On 16 December 2000, at the Sheffield Arena he challenged the reigning champion Panamanian, Mauricio Martinez and suffered a stoppage defeat after only 1 round. Martinez himself would go on to lose the belt in his next defence.

== British and Commonwealth champion ==
Following the defeat to Martinez, Pickering fought only twice in 2001 on both occasions beating journeyman Carl Allen. In 2002 Pickering fought Allen twice more again winning both times. Sandwiched in between those wins came a third career defeat for Pickering, travelling to the Canary Islands to challenge Spaniard Alejandro Monzon and dropping a split decision. On 8 February 2003 Pickering fought for the vacant Commonwealth super bantamweight title and finally lifted a title defeating Kenyan Duncan Karanja to take the belt. In his next fight on 12 July 2003 Pickering made his first defence of the title against Brian Carr in a fight which also saw the vacant British title on the line. Pickering stopped Carr in the fourth round at the Braehead Arena in Glasgow to leave Scotland with both championships. One more defence of his Commonwealth title took place on 24 October 2003 with Pickering retaining the belt by beating Ghana's Alfred Tetteh at the York Hall. He would not go on to defend the British title choosing instead to go the European route meaning that Michael Hunter would go on to take the vacant belt.

== European Champion and challenger ==
On 16 January 2004 Pickering travelled to the Town and Country club in Bradford to lift the European super bantamweight title. His opponent, Italian Vincenzo Gigliotti was stopped in the 10th round meaning that Pickering held the Commonwealth and European titles at the same time. Pickering would defend the belt twice more against Juan Garcia Martin in May 2004 and Miguel Mallon in June 2005, the latter victory taking place in Madrid. Sandwiched between the defence's on 8 May 2005 also came an 8-round victory over former British and European champion Noel Wilders. Pickering put his belts on the line, when on 28 October 2005, he challenged new British champion Michael Hunter for the belt that he never lost in the ring. In an exciting contest Pickering eventually went home empty handed dropping a majority decision for his fourth career defeat in a fight which took place in Hunter's backyard, the Borough Hall in Hartlepool. Pickering rebounded from the defeat with a victory over French journeyman Frederic Bonifai and with Hunter choosing to challenge for the IBF World title he found himself challenging for the now vacant title. The fight on 11 November 2006 took place in Dublin and saw Ireland's Bernard Dunne lift the belt with a unanimous victory over 12 rounds.

== Two time British champion and challenger ==
on 16 March 2007 Pickering once again challenged for the now vacant British title and lifted the belt for the second time, defeating Marc Callaghan at the Norwich Showground. The victory was followed up with two non-title fights for the Newark man with a victory over Steve Gethin in October 2007 closely followed by an 8-round defeat to Sean Hughes in November. The defeat to Hughes meant that Pickering's next title defence was to be against the man from Pontefract and the defeat was avenged with Hughes stopped in the 9th round. On 27 June 2008, Pickering made his second defence and lost the title to prospect Matthew Marsh at the York Hall. His next fight saw a move up to featherweight and another chance at a British title against another prospect in Scotland's Paul Appleby only to drop another 12-round decision in Glasgow for the 8th defeat of his career.

== Later career ==
Pickering returned to the ring on 23 May 2009 to defeat journeyman Sid Razak in Sleaford, Lincolnshire and followed this by traveling to Ukraine for an unexpected chance to regain the European title. Meeting reigning champion Oleg Yefimovych on 3 October 2009 in what was a voluntary defence for the champion, Pickering was outclassed and stopped in the third round. He returned once more on 29 May 2010 this time to compete in the Prizefighter series held at the York Hall in Bethnal Green. Pickering faced Josh Wale in the quarter final of the tournament, losing on a split decision to the younger man.

Preceded by Michael Alldis vacated	Commonwealth Super bantamweight champion 8 February 2003 – 28 October 2005	Succeeded by Michael Hunter
Preceded by Michael Alldis vacated	British Super bantamweight champion 12 July 2003 – 16 April 2004 vacated	Succeeded by Michael Hunter
Preceded by Mahyar Monshipour	EBU Super bantamweight champion 16 January 2004 – 28 October 2005	Succeeded by Michael Hunter
Preceded by Michael Hunter vacated	British Super bantamweight champion 16 March 2007 – 27 June 2008	Succeeded by Matthew Marsh
