= Steve Molitor =

Canadian boxer

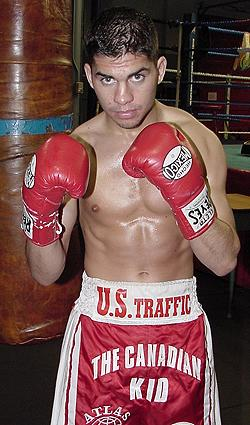

Personal information
- Nickname: The Canadian Kid
- Born: April 4, 1980 (age 46) Sarnia, Ontario, Canada
- Height: 5 ft 7 in (170 cm)
- Weight: Bantamweight; Super-bantamweight

Boxing career
- Stance: Southpaw

Boxing record
- Total fights: 37
- Wins: 34
- Win by KO: 12
- Losses: 3

Steve Molitor (born April 4, 1980) is a Canadian former professional boxer who competed from 2000 to 2012 and held the IBF super-bantamweight title twice between 2006 and 2011.

== Career history ==
Born in Sarnia, Ontario, Molitor began boxing at the age of nine, following in the footsteps of his brother, former commonwealth champion Jeremy Molitor. He won five national titles at 112 pounds. He participated in the Olympic trials but lost a decision to Mike Messel. His final amateur record was 93 wins and eleven losses.

Molitor became a professional boxer on May 18, 2000, with an eight-round decision over Julio Luna. In 2002 he scored his most notable win to date when he beat former Olympian Scotty Olson for the Canadian super bantamweight title. Later that year he beat Englishman Nicky Booth for the Commonwealth bantamweight championship. On April 21, 2004, Molitor defeated Hugo Dianzo for the vacated NABA North American title, by a unanimous decision.

On November 10, 2006, he knocked out Michael Hunter in the fifth round for the vacant IBF super bantamweight championship title. On July 14, 2007, Molitor dismantled South Africa's Takalani Ndlovu in his first title defense, by scoring a 9th-round TKO at Casino Rama in Rama, Ontario. He also defeated Thailand's Fahsan 3K Battery by unanimous decision on October 27 in his second defense, also at Casino Rama. On January 19, 2008, Molitor defended his title against Ricardo Castillo, with a unanimous decision victory.

On April 5, 2008, Molitor again defended his title defeating Fernando Beltran in a twelve-round unanimous decision, running his record to 27–0. The fight took place at Casino Rama.

In the early summer of 2008, Molitor parted ways with his trainer Chris Johnson and replaced him by Stéphan Larouche. On August 29 Molitor defended his title against the then unbeaten Ceferino Labarda. He won the match by TKO. The fight took place at Casino Rama.

On November 21, 2008, Molitor lost in his attempt to unify his IBF super bantamweight title with the WBA title against Celestino Caballero of Panama, the current defending WBA champion. Caballero won the fight in the fourth round by TKO at the Casino Rama, Ontario.

Molitor next fought Heriberto Ruiz on June 26, 2009, again at Casino Rama. Molitor won the fight on a split decision.

Molitor reunited with Chris Johnson before his 5th-round knockout win against Feliciano Ledezma on September 4, 2009, at Casino Rama.

On November 21, 2009, Molitor beat Jose Saez in 8 rounds via a unanimous decision.

On March 27, 2010, Molitor regained the IBF Junior Featherweight championship, again defeating Takalani Ndlovu in 12 rounds by unanimous decision.

On March 26, 2011, in his third bout against Ndlovu, Molitor lost his title via unanimous decision. The judges' scores were 118–110, 116–112, and 118–110.

On September 22, 2012, Molitor challenged for the IBF Inter-Continental Super-Bantamweight title in Belfast against Carl Frampton in front of Frampton's home town crowd in the city's Odyssey Arena. Frampton scored an impressive sixth-round TKO and had Molitor on the canvas three times during the one-sided bout.

== Professional boxing record ==
| 37 fights | 34 wins | 3 losses |
|---|---|---|
| By knockout | 12 | 2 |
| By decision | 22 | 1 |

| No. | Result | Record | Opponent | Type | Round, time | Date | Location | Notes |
|---|---|---|---|---|---|---|---|---|
| 37 | Loss | 34–3 | Carl Frampton | TKO | 6 (12), 2:21 | 22 Sep 2012 | Odyssey Arena, Belfast, Northern Ireland | For Commonwealth and IBF Inter-Continental super-bantamweight titles |
| 36 | Win | 34–2 | Sebastien Gauthier | SD | 10 | 5 Nov 2011 | Pepsi Coliseum, Quebec City, Quebec, Canada | |
| 35 | Loss | 33–2 | Takalani Ndlovu | UD | 12 | 26 Mar 2011 | Nasrec Indoor Arena, Johannesburg, South Africa | Lost IBF super-bantamweight title |
| 34 | Win | 33–1 | Jason Booth | MD | 12 | 11 Sep 2010 | Rainton Meadows Arena, Houghton-le-Spring, England | Retained IBF super-bantamweight title |
| 33 | Win | 32–1 | Takalani Ndlovu | UD | 12 | 27 Mar 2010 | Casino Rama, Rama, Ontario, Canada | Won vacant IBF super-bantamweight title |
| 32 | Win | 31–1 | Jose Saez | UD | 8 | 21 Nov 2009 | Casino Rama, Rama, Ontario, Canada | |
| 31 | Win | 30–1 | Feliciano Dario Azuaga | KO | 5 (8), 1:50 | 4 Sep 2009 | Casino Rama, Rama, Ontario, Canada | |
| 30 | Win | 29–1 | Heriberto Ruiz | SD | 12 | 26 Jun 2009 | Casino Rama, Rama, Ontario, Canada | |
| 29 | Loss | 28–1 | Celestino Caballero | TKO | 4 (12), 0:52 | 21 Nov 2008 | Casino Rama, Rama, Ontario, Canada | Lost IBF super-bantamweight title; For vacant WBA (Super) super-bantamweight title |
| 28 | Win | 28–0 | Ceferino Labarda | TKO | 10 (12), 2:34 | 29 Aug 2008 | Casino Rama, Rama, Ontario, Canada | Retained IBF super-bantamweight title |
| 27 | Win | 27–0 | Fernando Beltrán Jr. | UD | 12 | 5 Apr 2008 | Casino Rama, Rama, Ontario, Canada | Retained IBF super-bantamweight title |
| 26 | Win | 26–0 | Ricardo Castillo | UD | 12 | 19 Jan 2008 | Casino Rama, Rama, Ontario, Canada | Retained IBF super-bantamweight title |
| 25 | Win | 25–0 | Fahsan 3K Battery | UD | 12 | 27 Oct 2007 | Casino Rama, Rama, Ontario, Canada | Retained IBF super-bantamweight title |
| 24 | Win | 24–0 | Takalani Ndlovu | TKO | 9 (12), 1:42 | 14 Jul 2007 | Casino Rama, Rama, Ontario, Canada | Retained IBF super-bantamweight title |
| 23 | Win | 23–0 | Michael Hunter | KO | 5 (12), 1:32 | 10 Nov 2006 | Borough Hall, Hartlepool, England | Won vacant IBF super-bantamweight title |
| 22 | Win | 22–0 | Jorge Antonio Paredes | TKO | 3 (8), 2:05 | 21 Oct 2005 | Kool Haus, Toronto, Ontario, Canada | |
| 21 | Win | 21–0 | Debendra Thapa | TKO | 8 (10), 3:00 | 19 Aug 2005 | Hanover Marriott, Whippany, New Jersey, U.S. | |
| 20 | Win | 20–0 | Henry Arjona | UD | 8 | 18 Feb 2005 | The Docks Nightclub, Toronto, Ontario, Canada | |
| 19 | Win | 19–0 | Pedro Javier Torres | UD | 10 | 25 Jun 2004 | Sports & Entertainment Centre, Sarnia, Ontario, Canada | |
| 18 | Win | 18–0 | Hugo Dianzo | UD | 12 | 21 Apr 2004 | Royal York Hotel, Toronto, Ontario, Canada | Won vacant WBA–NABA bantamweight title |
| 17 | Win | 17–0 | John Mackay | PTS | 8 | 16 Jan 2004 | Town and Country Club, Bradford, England | |
| 16 | Win | 16–0 | Fausto del Rosario | TKO | 10 (12), 1:50 | 17 Sep 2003 | Diamond Aircraft Hangar, London, Ontario, Canada | |
| 15 | Win | 15–0 | Julio Coronel | UD | 10 | 25 Apr 2003 | Sandia Casino, Albuquerque, New Mexico, U.S. | |
| 14 | Win | 14–0 | Vicente Luis Burgo | TKO | 4 (10), 3:00 | 7 Mar 2003 | Niagara Falls Arena, Niagara Falls, Ontario, Canada | |
| 13 | Win | 13–0 | Nicky Booth | PTS | 12 | 21 Sep 2002 | Brentwood Centre, Brentwood, England | Won Commonwealth bantamweight title |
| 12 | Win | 12–0 | Jose de Jesus Lopez | UD | 10 | 21 Jun 2002 | Hershey Centre, Mississauga, Ontario, Canada | Retained WBF (Federation) bantamweight title |
| 11 | Win | 11–0 | Teofilo Manzueta | KO | 3 (12), 2:15 | 10 Apr 2002 | Royal York Hotel, Toronto, Ontario, Canada | Won vacant WBF (Federation) bantamweight title |
| 10 | Win | 10–0 | Scotty Olson | TKO | 5 (12) | 15 Feb 2002 | Shaw Conference Centre, Edmonton, Alberta, Canada | Won vacant Canada super-bantamweight title |
| 9 | Win | 9–0 | Silvio Luzon | UD | 12 | 4 Apr 2001 | Royal York Hotel, Toronto, Ontario, Canada | |
| 8 | Win | 8–0 | Shane Langford | UD | 4 | 19 Jan 2001 | Hevan's Banquet Hall, Toronto, Ontario, Canada | |
| 7 | Win | 7–0 | Steve Trumble | UD | 6 | 15 Dec 2000 | Molson Centre, Montreal, Quebec, Canada | |
| 6 | Win | 6–0 | Jason Adams | UD | 4 | 3 Nov 2000 | Molson Centre, Montreal, Quebec, Canada | |
| 5 | Win | 5–0 | Shane Langford | UD | 6 | 28 Sep 2000 | Fort Garry Place, Winnipeg, Manitoba, Canada | |
| 4 | Win | 4–0 | Joel Lopez | UD | 4 | 8 Sep 2000 | Molson Centre, Montreal, Quebec, Canada | |
| 3 | Win | 3–0 | Thierry Naulleau | TKO | 2 (4), 2:55 | 16 Aug 2000 | Molson Centre, Montreal, Quebec, Canada | |
| 2 | Win | 2–0 | Mark McQueen | TKO | 3 (4), 2:57 | 29 Jul 2000 | Antheniem Greektown Hotel, Detroit, Michigan, U.S. | |
| 1 | Win | 1–0 | Julio Luna | UD | 8 | 18 May 2000 | Fort Garry Place, Winnipeg, Manitoba, Canada | |

Sporting positions
World boxing titles
| Vacant Title last held by Israel Vázquez | IBF super-bantamweight champion November 10, 2006 – November 21, 2008 | Succeeded by Celestino Caballero |
| Vacant Title last held by Celestino Caballero | IBF super-bantamweight champion March 27, 2010 – March 26, 2011 | Succeeded by Takalani Ndlovu |
