= Santa Marta, Panama =

Santa Marta
- Corregimiento
- Location within Panama
- Coordinates: 8°31′12″N 82°42′0″W
- Country: Panama
- Province: Chiriquí
- District: Bugaba

Area
  - Land: 30.4 km^{2} (11.7 sq mi)

Population (2010)
  - Total: 3,679
  - Density: 120.9/km^{2} (313/sq mi)
- Population density calculated based on land area.
- Time zone: UTC−5 (EST)

Santa Marta is a corregimiento in Bugaba District, Chiriquí Province, Panama. It has a land area of 30.4 square kilometres (11.7 sq mi) and had a population of 3,679 as of 2010, giving it a population density of 120.9 inhabitants per square kilometre (313/sq mi). Its population as of 1990 was 2,940; its population as of 2000 was 3,396.

== Notable people ==
Ricardo Cordoba, former World Boxing Champion.
