= Al Seeger =

American boxer

Personal information
- Nickname: The Quiet Storm
- Born: Al Seeger; January 23, 1980 (age 46) Savannah, Georgia
- Height: 5 ft 9 in (175 cm)
- Weight: Super bantamweight

Boxing career
- Stance: Orthodox

Boxing record
- Total fights: 32
- Wins: 28
- Win by KO: 22
- Losses: 4
- Draws: 0
- No contests: 1

Al Seeger (born January 23, 1980), nicknamed "The Quiet Storm", is a boxer from the United States.

== Background ==
Al Seeger was born in Savannah, Georgia to Bonnie and Al Seeger. He spent most of his younger years traveling abroad with the family. Seeger began boxing at age eleven under the guidance of Mike Jarrell, Sr., and Jimmy Chumley of Jarrell's Boxing Gym in Savannah. Seegers first amateur fight was on March 22, 1991. As an amateur, he fought several times in the 80 lb weight division, and went on to compile a record of 26-6 while capturing several Junior Olympics and open division titles.

== Professional career ==
He made his professional debut on April 27, 2002, against Daniel Amaro (1-1-1). Through December 2008, Seeger had compiled a professional record of 27 wins and 4 losses.

Seeger first won the IBA Americas Super Bantamweight title on August 30, 2003. His first loss was on May 29, 2004, to Phillip Payne when he suffered a heat stroke. Seeger, however, rebounded from this loss and regained the IBA Americas title by defeating Luis Rivera. He went on to fight several more times before a rematch with Phillip Payne on April 14, 2006, which Seeger won by a third round TKO.

On September 2, 2005, Seeger won the International Boxing Association (IBA) World Super Bantamweight title by defeating Cesar Figueroa. He then successfully defended his title in a second-round TKO on July 28, 2006, against former Mexican Olympian, César Morales. On October 21, 2006, however, he lost the title to Daniel Ponce de León (WBO, IBA).

Seeger has since fought Mike Oliver on November 8, 2007 (IBO), and Yuriorkis Gamboa (WBC Intercontinental) on July 18, 2008. He lost both fights - the former by majority decision, and the second by a first-round TKO (a fight he took on two days' notice).

On April 30, 2009, Seeger fought Benjamin Flores (NABF). The referee stopped the fight in the eighth round. Flores was led to his corner but collapsed shortly afterward. He was rushed to hospital but never regained consciousness and died five days later.
