= Davey Browne =

Australian boxer

Davey Browne Jr (21 December 1986 – 14 September 2015) was an Australian professional boxer (22–2–1, 8 knockouts).

Browne died three days after sustaining brain injuries in a boxing match against Filipino Carlo Magali (19–7–3, 9 KOs) on 11 September 2015 in Ingleburn, Australia. He was knocked out with 30 seconds left in the 12th and final round. One report had Browne winning the fight before the knockout; another report stated that Browne was in control early, but that Magali had him in trouble in the 6th round and had knocked him down in the 11th. There was speculation that Browne may have been distracted by loose tape on his gloves and taken his eyes off his opponent when the knockout punch landed. Australian National Boxing Federation president John McDougall, who was in attendance, said after seeing Browne taken unconscious to hospital: "Now it’s in the hands of God, unfortunately." The match was for an IBF regional title.

Before his death, Browne's only loss was to fellow countryman Billy Dib.

Professionally, Browne was a regional, national and youth champion winning the following titles:

Jul 2006 – Super Bantamweight Australia Champion
Nov 2007 – WBF Super Bantamweight International Champion
Apr 2008 – IBF Super Bantamweight Pan Pacific Youth Champion
May 2008 – IBF Super Bantamweight Pan Pacific Youth Champion
Oct 2008 – IBF Featherweight Pan Pacific Youth Champion and WBC Youth World Featherweight Champion
Oct 2009 – WBC Youth World Featherweight Champion
Sep 2014 – WBC Eurasian Pacific Super Featherweight Champion

Browne was a father of two children and came from Sydney's south-west.
