= Joan Guzmán =

Dominican professional boxer (born 1976)

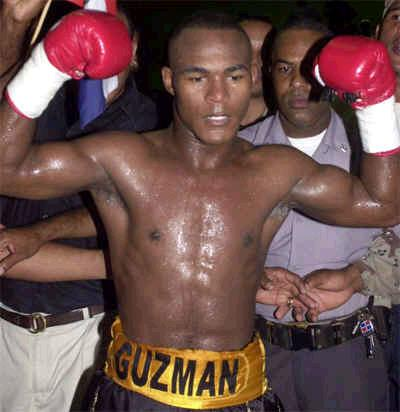

Personal information
- Nicknames: El Pequeño Tyson ("The Little Tyson"); Sycuan Warrior
- Born: May 1, 1976 (age 50) Santo Domingo, Dominican Republic
- Height: 5 ft 7 in (170 cm)
- Weight: Super bantamweight; Featherweight; Super featherweight; Lightweight; Light welterweight

Boxing career
- Reach: 66 in (168 cm)
- Stance: Orthodox

Boxing record
- Total fights: 37
- Wins: 34
- Win by KO: 21
- Losses: 1
- Draws: 1
- No contests: 1
Medal record
Men's amateur boxing
Representing Dominican Republic
Pan American Games
| Gold medal – first place | 1995 Mar del Plata | Flyweight |
Central American and Caribbean Games
| Gold medal – first place | 1993 Ponce | Light flyweight |

Joan Guzmán (born May 1, 1976) is a Dominican former professional boxer who competed from 1997 to 2014. He held world championships in two weight classes, including the World Boxing Organization (WBO) super bantamweight title from 2002 to 2005, and the WBO junior lightweight title from 2006 to 2008.

== Amateur career ==
Having started boxing at nine, Guzman won 310 out of 320 bouts as an amateur. Included in these victories was a gold medal winning bout at the 1995 Pan American Games. He also competed in the 1996 Olympics in Atlanta, Georgia where he lost to future record setting world champion Omar Andrés Narváez from Argentine.

== Professional career ==
Guzmán began his professional career in the United States. His debut fight, on September 23, 1997, was held in Phoenix, Arizona. There, he knocked out Juan Miguel Rivera in two rounds. After another second-round knockout win (this time at the Madison Square Garden in New York City), he returned to the Dominican Republic.

He took off two years from boxing, then he came back for his first fight in his homeland. On March 11, 1999, he outpointed Orlando Mateo over eight rounds at Santo Domingo. He fought six more times before being given a title try for the Dominican featherweight title.

During his two-year lay-off, he dropped off in weight, from the featherweight division to the super bantamweight division.

On October 25, 1999, he knocked out Francisco de Leon in round eleven to win the national title. He retained the title once, with a two-round knockout of Santiago Matos. He later knocked out Hector Julio Avila in the second round on August 9, 2001, for the vacant NABO regional super bantamweight title.

Another win was especially significant, since it was for the WBO's Latino title, as well as for the WBO's vacant intercontinental title and for Guzman's NABO title. Guzman added those two new regional championships and retained the one he already owned, by beating Edel Ruiz by decision, in a fight held in Tacoma, Washington on September 29, 2001.

=== World championships ===
Guzmán became ranked number one in the super bantamweight division of the WBO. The WBO's world super bantamweight champion, Agapito Sanchez, travelled to Cardiff, Wales, to defend his title against Guzmán, but was diagnosed with a detached retina during a required medical check-up days before the fight and was then removed of the title. Sánchez temporarily retired from boxing and Guzmán found himself fighting Fabio Oliva for the vacant WBO's world super bantamweight title on August 17, 2002. Guzmán won the championship with a 3rd-round knockout win. Sánchez returned to boxing and at last fought Guzmán on February 26, 2004, in San Diego, California. Guzmán retained the title, knocking out the former world champion in seven rounds. He later defended that title, defeating previously unbeaten Fernando Beltrán by unanimous decision on April 22, 2005. Following his impressive victory, Guzmán moved to the super featherweight division.

At the weigh-in before his scheduled fight for the WBO super featherweight title on September 16, 2006, the title holder, Jorge Rodrigo Barrios, was overweight was eventually stripped of the WBO super featherweight title. Guzman then won the fight and the title by split decision. Guzman then defended his new title with wins over contender Antonio Davis on December 18, 2006, and future two division champion Humberto Soto on November 17, 2007, both by unanimous decision.

=== Move to lightweight ===
In May 2008, Guzman elected to vacate his WBO super featherweight title in order to continue his career in the lightweight division. He was supposed to fight for Nate Campbell's unified WBA super, WBO and IBF titles, on September 13, 2008. Disappointingly, he came in 3½ pounds over the 135 lb. limit. Thus, the fight was cancelled and Guzman was rushed to a hospital after experiencing dehydration and coughing blood. A dismayed Campbell who went through such trouble to fight him, branded Guzman's pull-out as an unprofessional gesture. With regards to his failure, Guzman issued an apology to his fans, people surrounding the scheduled bout, and to Campbell in particular.

On December 20, 2008, Guzman took on Ameth Diaz for the WBA lightweight title eliminator. Unlike his bout with Campbell, Guzman successfully made the weight limit. Guzman won his first-ever match as a lightweight by unanimous decision.

In an attempt to win a world title at a third weight division, Guzman challenged well regarded Ali Funeka on November 28, 2009, for the vacant IBF lightweight title. Unfortunately for both fighters, the bout resulted in a majority draw which most believed Funeka won by a wide margin.

Guzman and Funeka fought again on March 27, 2010, for the same championship. This time however, only Funeka had a chance to win the title as Guzman was 9 pounds above the lightweight limit. Nevertheless, the bout went on as scheduled. There, Guzman managed to score a knockdown as well as scoring enough points to win by split decision, leaving the belt vacant.

=== Light welterweight ===
Guzman's well documented struggles to make the 135 lb lightweight limit prompted him to move to junior welterweight. His first bout at 140 lbs against Jason Davis took place on the undercard of Amir Khan vs. Marcos Maidana on December 11 at the Mandalay Bay Resort & Casino in Las Vegas. The bout was ended by TKO in just the second round in the favour of Guzman, although he notably failed to make the weight for the second consecutive bout, coming in at 144.5 lbs

=== Positive testing drug controversy ===
In the post-fight drug test after the bout against Davis, however, Guzman tested positive for Furosemide, a diuretic banned by the Nevada State Athletic Commission, and the same kind used by Ali Funeka who was suspended for nine months after the rematch with Guzman. As a penalty, Guzman was suspended from boxing for eight months and his latest victory was turned into a no-contest. After complying with an eight-month suspension for, admittedly, having used a diuretic in an attempt to make weight for his fight against Jason Davis in December, 2010; Joan Guzman returned to the ring at 140 lbs. (Super lightweight) in his homeland, Dominican Republic, against Colombian Florencio Castellano in January 2012. Guzman knocked out Castellano in the first round, roughly 2:59 minutes into it. It was his first fight under the roster of Acquinity Sports (now Iron Mike Productions), a Florida-based promotion company, which has bet on the athlete's talent; and his first knock-out in at least ten fights(Excluding Davis's turned no-contest). On March 2, 2012, Guzman faced Puerto Rican Jesus Pabón. The fight was presented as the main event at ESPN2's Friday Night Fights. The event was named 'D-Day Dominican Domination' and featured several Dominican boxers, including Ed 'The Lion' Paredes and Juan Carlos Payano. Guzman came in for the first official weigh-in a quarter-pound heavier than the mandatory 140 lbs., needing two more attempts to finally make weight. However, Joan seemed pretty strong at 140. He knocked down Pabon in the very first round with a left hook; followed by consecutive knock-downs in the second and third rounds. Although Joan dominated all rounds, critics complained about his lack of 'killer instinct' and his showboating, which they say the ex-titlist might have used to hide the fact that he had grown physically tired. Pabon, even though he won no rounds, showed some guts in rounds five and six, landing a few good punches. In round eight, Joan came out strong again, and both boxers exchanged some punches. Pabon, the weaker of the two, was caught with a left hook that dropped him for good. Joan Guzman remained undefeated in 35 professional bouts. His record then stood at 33-0-1 and one No-contest (20 ko).

=== Unbeaten streak ends ===
On November 30, 2012, Guzman challenged Khabib Allakhverdiev for the IBO and vacant WBA super lightweight championship. The bout ended in the 8th round as Guzman hurt his knee which resulted from an accidental foul. The verdict was a technical decision in favor of Allakhverdiev. Guzman was knocked down in the third round, the result of a left; and blood readily flowing from the boxer's nose in the fifth set the momentum for the loss. The Sycuan Warrior did not show his trademark elusive style until it was practically too late in the fight. Only in rounds 6 and 7 did Guzman employ the kind of fighting technique that had kept him undefeated during his career. He circled, jabbed, and effectively counter-punched the Russian, evidently frustrating him. But, when in the 8th, he tripped and hurt his leg in the fall, Khabib responded with everything he had, setting the impression that he was the dominant fighter. Guzman could not go on due to the leg injury and the referee stopped the fight due to 'accidental foul', which led to the score cards deciding the winner. Two judges declared Khabib the better man on the ring. Talks of a rematch immediately ensued.

== Professional boxing record ==
| 37 fights | 34 wins | 1 loss |
|---|---|---|
| By knockout | 21 | 0 |
| By decision | 13 | 1 |
| Draws | 1 | |
| No contests | 1 | |

| No. | Result | Record | Opponent | Type | Round, time | Date | Location | Notes |
|---|---|---|---|---|---|---|---|---|
| 37 | Win | 34–1–1 (1) | Kevin Carter | TKO | 5 (6) | Oct 31, 2014 | San Jose Fiesta, Nashville, Tennessee, U.S. | |
| 36 | Loss | 33–1–1 (1) | Khabib Allakhverdiev | TD | 8 (12) | Nov 30, 2012 | BB&T Center, Sunrise, Florida, U.S. | For IBO and vacant WBA (Regular) light welterweight titles; Split TD: Guzmán unable to continue after a knee injury |
| 35 | Win | 33–0–1 (1) | Jorge Pimentel | KO | 1 (10), 2:04 | Jul 21, 2012 | Hard Rock Live, Hollywood, Florida, U.S. | Won vacant WBA–NABA interim light welterweight title |
| 34 | Win | 32–0–1 (1) | Jesus Pabon | KO | 8 (10), 1:23 | Mar 2, 2012 | Westin Diplomat Resort and Spa, Hollywood, Florida, U.S. | Won vacant WBC FECARBOX light welterweight title |
| 33 | Win | 31–0–1 (1) | Florencio Castellano | KO | 1 (12), 2:58 | Nov 18, 2011 | Renaissance Jaragua Hotel & Casino, Santo Domingo, Dominican Republic | Won vacant IBF Caribbean light welterweight title |
| 32 | NC | 30–0–1 (1) | Jason Davis | KO | 2 (10), 0:29 | Dec 11, 2010 | Mandalay Bay Events Center, Paradise, Nevada, U.S. | Originally a KO win for Guzmán, later ruled an NC after he failed a drug test |
| 31 | Win | 30–0–1 | Ali Funeka | SD | 12 | Mar 27, 2010 | The Joint, Paradise, Nevada, U.S. | |
| 30 | Draw | 29–0–1 | Ali Funeka | MD | 12 | Nov 28, 2009 | Colisée Pepsi, Quebec City, Quebec, Canada | For vacant IBF lightweight title |
| 29 | Win | 29–0 | Ammeth Diaz | UD | 12 | Dec 20, 2008 | Palacio de los Deportes Virgilio Travieso Soto, Santo Domingo, Dominican Republic | Won WBA Fedelatin lightweight title |
| 28 | Win | 28–0 | Humberto Soto | UD | 12 | Nov 17, 2007 | Borgata, Atlantic City, New Jersey, U.S. | Retained WBO junior lightweight title |
| 27 | Win | 27–0 | Antonio Davis | UD | 12 | Dec 18, 2006 | Palacio de los Deportes Virgilio Travieso Soto, Santo Domingo, Dominican Republic | Retained WBO junior lightweight title |
| 26 | Win | 26–0 | Jorge Rodrigo Barrios | SD | 12 | Sep 16, 2006 | MGM Grand Garden Arena, Paradise, Nevada, U.S. | Won WBO junior lightweight title |
| 25 | Win | 25–0 | Javier Jáuregui | UD | 10 | May 6, 2006 | MGM Grand Garden Arena, Paradise, Nevada, U.S. | |
| 24 | Win | 24–0 | Terdsak Kokietgym | UD | 12 | Aug 26, 2005 | Westchester County Center, White Plains, New York, U.S. | |
| 23 | Win | 23–0 | Fernando Beltrán Jr. | UD | 12 | Apr 22, 2005 | Dodge Arena, Hidalgo, Texas, U.S. | Retained WBO super bantamweight title |
| 22 | Win | 22–0 | Joe Morales | UD | 10 | Nov 6, 2004 | Glendale Arena, Glendale, Arizona, U.S. | |
| 21 | Win | 21–0 | Agapito Sánchez | TKO | 7 (12), 1:05 | Feb 26, 2004 | Sports Arena, San Diego, California, U.S. | Retained WBO super bantamweight title |
| 20 | Win | 20–0 | Alfaro Gonzalez | KO | 1 (8), 1:56 | Aug 29, 2003 | Magnum Eventos, Panama City, Panama | |
| 19 | Win | 19–0 | Jorge Monsalvo | KO | 1 (10) | Jul 27, 2003 | Club San Carlos, Santo Domingo, Dominican Republic | |
| 18 | Win | 18–0 | Fabio Daniel Oliva | KO | 3 (12), 1:10 | Aug 17, 2002 | Cardiff Castle, Cardiff, Wales | Won vacant WBO super bantamweight title |
| 17 | Win | 17–0 | Armando Guerrero | UD | 10 | Feb 26, 2002 | Sunset Station, San Antonio, Texas, U.S. | |
| 16 | Win | 16–0 | Edel Ruiz | UD | 12 | Sep 29, 2001 | Emerald Queen Casino, Tacoma, Washington, U.S. | Retained WBO–NABO super bantamweight title; Won vacant WBO Inter-Continental and WBO Latino super bantamweight titles |
| 15 | Win | 15–0 | Héctor Ávila | KO | 2 (12) | Aug 9, 2001 | Santo Domingo, Dominican Republic | Won Dominican Republic and vacant WBO–NABO super bantamweight titles |
| 14 | Win | 14–0 | Julio Jerez | TKO | 2 | Mar 8, 2001 | Santo Domingo, Dominican Republic | |
| 13 | Win | 13–0 | Aneudis Cuevas Pena | TKO | 1 | Dec 21, 2000 | La Romana, Dominican Republic | |
| 12 | Win | 12–0 | Dionisio Moreno | KO | 1 | Nov 23, 2000 | Santo Domingo, Dominican Republic | |
| 11 | Win | 11–0 | Julio Jerez | KO | 1 | Jun 29, 2000 | Santo Domingo, Dominican Republic | |
| 10 | Win | 10–0 | Santiago Matos | TKO | 2 (12) | Feb 1, 2000 | Santo Domingo, Dominican Republic | Retained Dominican Republic featherweight title |
| 9 | Win | 9–0 | Francisco De Leon | TKO | 11 (12) | Oct 25, 1999 | Santo Domingo, Dominican Republic | Won Dominican Republic featherweight title |
| 8 | Win | 8–0 | Rafael de la Cruz | KO | 5 | Aug 3, 1999 | Santo Domingo, Dominican Republic | |
| 7 | Win | 7–0 | Francisco Pena | TKO | 1 | Jul 19, 1999 | Santo Domingo, Dominican Republic | |
| 6 | Win | 6–0 | Orlando Mateo | KO | 1 | Jun 5, 1999 | Santo Domingo, Dominican Republic | |
| 5 | Win | 5–0 | Pascual Polanco | TKO | 1 | Apr 17, 1999 | La Romana, Dominican Republic | |
| 4 | Win | 4–0 | Jose Luis Sulbaran | PTS | 6 | Mar 29, 1999 | Santo Domingo, Dominican Republic | |
| 3 | Win | 3–0 | Orlando Mateo | PTS | 8 | Mar 11, 1999 | Santo Domingo, Dominican Republic | |
| 2 | Win | 2–0 | Henry Bowden | KO | 2 (4), 2:51 | Dec 19, 1997 | Madison Square Garden, New York City, New York, U.S. | |
| 1 | Win | 1–0 | Juan Miguel Rivera | TKO | 2 (4), 1:29 | Sep 23, 1997 | Celebrity Theatre, Phoenix, Arizona, U.S. | |

== Post-boxing ==
Guzman is currently serving as a trainer to newcomer boxer named Mikkel LesPierre.

Sporting positions
Regional boxing titles
| Preceded by Francisco De Leon | Dominican Republic featherweight champion October 25, 1999 – November 9, 2003; Vacated | Vacant Title next held by Jose Anibal Cruz |
| Preceded by Francisco De Leon | Dominican Republic junior featherweight champion August 9, 2001 – November 21, 2005; Vacated | Vacant Title next held by Hector Julio Avila |
| Vacant Title last held by Danny Romero Jr | WBO-NABO super bantamweight champion August 9, 2001 – August 10, 2002; Vacated | Vacant Title next held by Gerardo Espinoza |
| Vacant Title last held by Jorge Monsalvo | WBO Latino super bantamweight champion September 29, 2001 – October 31, 2002; Vacated | Vacant Title next held by Celestino Caballero |
| Vacant Title last held by Agapito Sanchez | WBO Inter-Continental super bantamweight champion September 29, 2001 – December 11, 2004; Vacated | Vacant Title next held by Yersin Zhailauov |
| Preceded by Ammeth Diaz | WBA Fedelatin lightweight champion December 20, 2008 – February 28, 2009; Vacated | Vacant Title next held by Oscar Jesus Pereyra |
| Inaugural Champion | IBF Caribbean light welterweight champion November 18, 2011 – ? | Succeeded by Incumbent |
| Vacant Title last held by Armando Robles | WBC FECARBOX light welterweight champion March 2, 2012 – December 14, 2012; Vacated | Vacant Title next held by Armando Robles |
| Preceded by Dierry Jean | WBA-NABA light welterweight champion Interim title July 21, 2012 – October 26, 2012; Vacated | Vacant Title next held by Dierry Jean |
World boxing titles
| Vacant Title last held by Agapito Sánchez | WBO super bantamweight champion August 17, 2002 – July 4, 2005; Vacated | Vacant Title next held by Daniel Ponce de León |
| Vacant Title last held by Jorge Rodrigo Barrios | WBO junior lightweight champion September 16, 2006 – May 14, 2008; Vacated | Succeeded by Alex Arthur promoted from interim status |
Olympic Games
| Preceded by Altagracia Contreras | Flagbearer for Dominican Republic; Atlanta 1996 | Succeeded by Wanda Rijo |
