= Ricardo Cordoba =

Panamanian boxer

Personal information
- Nickname: Maestrito
- Born: Ricardo Alberto Cordoba Mosquera; 11 October 1983 (age 42) Santa Marta, Panama
- Height: 5 ft 8 in (173 cm)
- Weight: Super flyweight; Bantamweight; Super bantamweight; Featherweight

Boxing career
- Stance: Southpaw

Boxing record
- Total fights: 44
- Wins: 39
- Win by KO: 25
- Losses: 3
- Draws: 2

Ricardo Alberto Cordoba Mosquera (born 11 October 1983 in Santa Marta, Panama) is a former professional boxer who fought in the super bantamweight division.

== Professional career ==
Cordoba turned professional in September 2000. In his debut at the Gimnasio de los Leones, David, Panama, Cordoba defeated fellow debutant Hussein Sanchez with a knockout in the first round.

On September 18, 2008, Cordoba defeated Luis Pérez via twelve-round unanimous decision in Panama City for the vacant WBA Interim Super Bantamweight Title.

Cordoba was promoted to the full-fledge WBA Super Bantamweight champion on November 21, 2008 after fellow-Panamanian Celestino Caballero won an IBF title to become unified champion.

Cordoba lost his WBA title to Irishman Bernard Dunne on March 21, 2009, being knocked out in the 11th (of 12) round.

Cordoba would get another shot at a world title when he faced Guillermo Rigondeaux for the WBA super bantamweight interim title, he would lose a close decision.

== Professional boxing record ==
44 fights	39 wins	3 losses
By knockout	25	1
By decision	14	2
Draws	2	

No.	Result	Record	Opponent	Type	Round, time	Date	Location	Notes
44	Win	39–3–2	Eduardo Garcia	KO	5 (10)	2012-03-31	Hotel Melia, Colón, Panama	Won vacant WBC Latino featherweight title
43	Win	38–3–2	Miguel Dionisio Cogollo Valdez	KO	2 (8)	2012-02-03	Hotel Sheraton, Colón, Panama	
42	Loss	37–3–2	Guillermo Rigondeaux	SD	12 (12)	2010-11-13	Cowboys Stadium, Arlington, Texas, U.S.	For interim WBA super-bantamweight title
41	Win	37–2–2	Jose Gutierrez	UD	8 (8)	2010-04-30	Hotel Melia Panama Canal, Colón, Panama	
40	Win	36–2–2	Luis Felipe Cuadrado	TKO	4 (10)	2009-12-18	Karibe Convention Center, Pétion-Ville, Haiti	
39	Win	35–2–2	Eddy Julio	TKO	10 (10)	2009-10-09	Roberto Durán Arena, Panama City, Panama	
38	Loss	34–2–2	Bernard Dunne	TKO	11 (12)	2009-03-21	The O2, Dublin, Ireland	Lost WBA super-bantamweight title
37	Win	34–1–2	Luis Alberto Pérez	UD	12 (12)	2008-09-18	Figali Convention Center, Panama City, Panama	Won interim WBA super-bantamweight title
36	Win	33–1–2	Jose Arboleda	MD	10 (10)	2008-07-02	Atlapa Convention Centre, Panama City, Panama	
35	Win	32–1–2	Franklin Solis	TKO	3 (8)	2008-05-07	Atlapa Convention Centre, Panama City, Panama	
34	Win	31–1–2	Danys Diaz	TKO	5 (10)	2007-09-22	Roberto Durán Arena, Panama City, Panama	Won vacant WBA Fedelatin super-bantamweight title
33	Win	30–1–2	Heivinson Herrera	UD	8 (8)	2007-06-02	Roberto Durán Arena, Panama City, Panama	
32	Draw	29–1–2	Volodymyr Sydorenko	MD	12 (12)	2007-03-17	Hanns-Martin-Schleyer-Halle, Stuttgart, Germany	For WBA bantamweight title
31	Win	29–1–1	Edinson Jimenez	UD	8 (8)	2006-12-29	Gimnasio Municipal, Antón, Panama	
30	Win	28–1–1	Miguel Dionisio Cogollo Valdez	KO	1 (8)	2006-07-15	Gimnasio Municipal, Antón, Panama	
29	Draw	27–1–1	Volodymyr Sydorenko	MD	12 (12)	2006-03-11	Color Line Arena, Hamburg, Germany	For WBA bantamweight title
28	Win	27–1	Yogli Herrera	UD	10 (10)	2005-12-10	Figali Convention Center, Panama City, Panama	Won vacant WBA Fedelatin bantamweight title
27	Win	26–1	Diego Martinez	KO	5 (8)	2005-10-15	Figali Convention Center, Panama City, Panama	
26	Loss	25–1	Poonsawat Kratingdaenggym	SD	12 (12)	2005-08-31	Rajadamnern Stadium, Bangkok, Thailand	For interim WBA bantamweight title
25	Win	25–0	Jean Javier Sotelo	UD	10 (10)	2005-04-16	Roberto Durán Arena, Panama City, Panama	
24	Win	24–0	Dairo Julio	KO	1 (10)	2005-01-28	Jardin El Suspiro, San Miguelito, Panama	
23	Win	23–0	Carlos Meza	TKO	12 (12)	2004-12-03	Arena Panama Al Brown, Colón, Panama	Retained WBC Latino bantamweight title
22	Win	22–0	Celestino Caballero	UD	12 (12)	2004-05-25	Atlapa Convention Centre, Panama City, Panama	Won NABA & Panamanian super-bantamweight titles
21	Win	21–0	Sergio Gonzalez	TKO	1 (12)	2004-03-16	Atlapa Convention Centre, Panama City, Panama	Won vacant WBC Latino bantamweight title
20	Win	20–0	Davis Arosemena	TKO	3 (12)	2003-10-03	Roberto Durán Arena, Panama City, Panama	Won vacant WBC Latino super-flyweight title
19	Win	19–0	Pedro Rincon Miranda	UD	10 (10)	2003-05-16	Arena Panama Al Brown, Colón, Panama	
18	Win	18–0	Arquimedes Gonzalez	KO	5 (6)	2003-01-31	Arena Panama Al Brown, Colón, Panama	
17	Win	17–0	Javier Espinoza	KO	1 (6)	2002-09-14	Gimnasio Escolar, David, Panama	
16	Win	16–0	Andres Ciriaco	UD	8 (8)	2002-08-03	Gimnasio de los Leones, Panama City, Panama	
15	Win	15–0	Jose Morales	TKO	2 (6)	2002-05-18	Rancho Local, La Mata, Panama	
14	Win	14–0	William Gonzalez	TKO	10 (10)	2002-03-23	Centro Recreativo del Educador, Penonomé, Panama	
13	Win	13–0	Anel Mitre	TKO	1 (4)	2002-03-10	Gimnasio Belisario Porras, Boquete, Panama	
12	Win	12–0	Marcos Sanchez	KO	3 (12)	2002-01-30	Hotel Continental, Panama City, Panama	Won Panamanian bantamweight title
11	Win	11–0	Jose Plinio Gonzalez	TKO	5 (6)	2001-12-15	Arena Panama Al Brown, Colón, Panama	
10	Win	10–0	Davis Arosemena	UD	12 (12)	2001-11-16	Hotel El Panamá, Panama City, Panama	Won vacant Panamanian super-flyweight title
9	Win	9–0	Alex Saavedra	KO	3 (6)	2001-09-22	Gimnasio Municipal, Santiago de Veraguas, Panama	
8	Win	8–0	Roinet Caballero	TKO	6 (6)	2001-08-18	Arena Panama Al Brown, Colón, Panama	
7	Win	7–0	Alex Saavedra	TKO	9 (12)	2001-07-13	Atlapa Convention Centre, Panama City, Panama	Won vacant WBC FECARBOX super-flyweight title
6	Win	6–0	Roinet Caballero	SD	4 (4)	2001-06-02	Jardín Oasis, Santa Marta, Panama	
5	Win	5–0	Roinet Caballero	UD	6 (6)	2001-05-19	Arena Panama Al Brown, Colón, Panama	
4	Win	4–0	Jose Plinio Gonzalez	TKO	3 (6)	2001-03-31	Salón Magnum Eventus, Panama City, Panama	
3	Win	3–0	Jose Plinio Gonzalez	UD	4 (4)	2000-11-18	Jardin El Rancho, Panama City, Panama	
2	Win	2–0	Luis Carpintero	TKO	2 (4)	2000-10-28	Gimnasio Yuyin Luzcando, Panama City, Panama	
1	Win	1–0	Hussein Sanchez	TKO	1 (4)	2000-09-23	Gimnasio del Club de Leones, David, Panama	

== Personal life ==
Cordoba is now an attorney in Panama.

== See also ==
- List of southpaw stance boxers
- List of world super-bantamweight boxing champions

Sporting positions
Regional boxing titles
Vacant Title last held by Roberto Bonilla	WBC FECARBOX super-flyweight champion July 13, 2001 – 2001; Vacated	Vacant Title next held by Miguel Alfonso Garcia Lopez
Vacant Title last held by Evangelio Pérez	Panamanian super-flyweight champion November 16, 2001 – 2004; Vacated	Vacant Title next held by Alberto Mitre
Preceded by Marcos Sánchez	Panamanian bantamweight champion January 30, 2002 – September 18, 2008; Won interim title	Vacant Title next held by Édgar Valencia
New title	WBC Latino super-flyweight champion October 3, 2003 – 2004; Vacated	Vacant Title next held by José Antonio López Bueno
Vacant Title last held by Angel Antonio Priolo	WBC Latino bantamweight champion March 16, 2004 – 2006; Vacated	Vacant Title next held by Cristian Faccio
Preceded by Celestino Caballero	NABA super-bantamweight champion May 25, 2004 – May, 2004; Vacated	Vacant Title next held by Phillip Payne
Preceded by Celestino Caballero	Panamanian super-bantamweight champion May 25, 2004 – September 18, 2008; Won interim title	Vacant Title next held by Jhonatan Arenas
Vacant Title last held by Pablo David Sepúlveda	WBA Fedelatin bantamweight champion December 10, 2005 – 2006; Vacated	Vacant Title next held by Nehomar Cermeño
Vacant Title last held by Jose Arboleda	WBA Fedelatin super-bantamweight champion September 22, 2007 – September 18, 2008; Won interim title	Vacant Title next held by Sergio Manuel Medina
Vacant Title last held by Gregorio Torres	WBC Latino featherweight champion March 31, 2012 – 2013; Vacated	Vacant Title next held by Jezreel Corrales
World boxing titles
Vacant Title last held by Celestino Caballero	WBA super-bantamweight champion Interim title September 18, 2008 – November 21, 2008; Promoted	Vacant Title next held by Poonsawat Kratingdaenggym
New title	WBA super-bantamweight champion Regular title November 21, 2008 – March 21, 2009	Succeeded by Bernard Dunne
