= Michael Hunter (boxer) =

English boxer

Personal information
- Nationality: British
- Born: Michael Hunter; 5 May 1978 (age 48) Hartlepool, England
- Height: 5 ft 7½ in
- Weight: Super bantamweight

Boxing career
- Reach: 69 in (175 cm)
- Stance: Orthodox

Boxing record
- Total fights: 33
- Wins: 30
- Win by KO: 13
- Losses: 2
- Draws: 1

Michael Hunter (born 5 May 1978) is a British professional boxer who competed from 2000 to 2012. He challenged once for the vacant IBF super bantamweight title in 2006. At regional level, he held the British super bantamweight title from 2004 to 2005; the Commonwealth super bantamweight title in 2005; and the EBU European super bantamweight title from 2005 to 2006.

== Amateur career ==
He won the 1997 Amateur Boxing Association British flyweight title and 1999 bantamweight title, when boxing out of the Hartlepool Boys Welfare ABC.

== Professional career ==
He won his British super bantamweight title against Mark Payne in April 2004, before that landing Northern Area (W John Barnes) and WBF World Title (W Frankie De Milo) honours. He made two British title defences before meeting Esham Pickering in October 2005. In a classic encounter for the European, Commonwealth and British titles, Hunter was knocked down twice before rallying to secure a close, controversial win via a majority decision victory.

He made three quick European title defences – all stoppage wins – before he was beaten for the first time by Steve Molitor on 10 November 2006 by 5th-round KO for the IBF Super Bantamweight Title. Hunter regrouped and defeated Ben Odamattey on points in March 2007.

He lost to Jason Booth for the British super bantamweight belt in Sunderland in October 2009, and ended his career with a points win over Sid Razak at Borough Hall in 2012.

Most of his career happened under the oversight of coach Neil Fannan and promoter Dave Garside.
