= Eduardo Escobedo =

Mexican boxer (born 1984)

Personal information
- Nickname: Canilla
- Born: Eduardo Felipe Escobedo Mateo; 4 February 1984 (age 42) Mexico City, Mexico
- Height: 1.68 m (5 ft 6 in)
- Weight: Super featherweight Featherweight; Super bantamweight

Boxing career
- Reach: 182 cm (72 in)
- Stance: Orthodox

Boxing record
- Total fights: 39
- Wins: 34
- Win by KO: 24
- Losses: 5
- Draws: 0
- No contests: 0

Eduardo Felipe Escobedo Mateo (born 4 February 1984) is a Mexican professional boxer.

== Professional career ==
=== WBO Super Bantamweight Championship ===
On December 8, 2007, Eduardo lost to Daniel Ponce de León, the bout was for Ponce's WBO Super Bantamweight title.

In June 2010, Escobedo beat the veteran Aristides Perez by T.K.O. to win the WBC Silver super featherweight title, the bout was held at the Estadio Centenario in Los Mochis, Sinaloa, Mexico.
