= Benjamín Flores (Mexican boxer) =

Mexican boxer (1984–2009)

Personal information
- Nationality: (Mexico) Mexican
- Born: May 24, 1984 Morelia, Michoacán, Mexico
- Died: May 5, 2009 (aged 24) Dallas, Texas, United States
- Height: 5 ft 6 in (1.68 m)
- Weight: Super Bantamweight

Boxing career
- Stance: Orthodox

Boxing record
- Total fights: 23
- Wins: 19
- Win by KO: 6
- Losses: 4
- Draws: 0
- No contests: 0

Benjamín Flores (May 24, 1984 – May 5, 2009) was a Mexican professional boxer from Morelia, Michoacán. He died from a brain injury sustained during his defeat on April 30, 2009, by Al Seeger.
