= Sean Hughes (boxer) =

British professional boxer (born 1982)

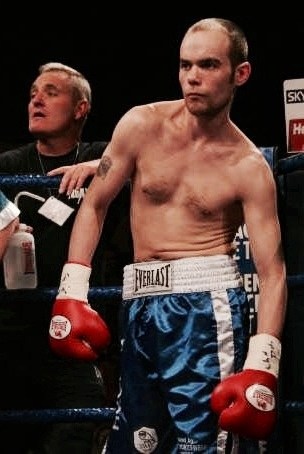

Personal information
- Nickname: Short Fuse
- Nationality: British
- Born: 5 June 1982 (age 44) Pontefract, England
- Height: 5 ft 9 in (1.75 m)
- Weight: Bantamweight, super bantamweight, featherweight

Boxing career
- Stance: Southpaw

Boxing record
- Total fights: 31
- Wins: 17
- Win by KO: 1
- Losses: 12
- Draws: 2

Sean Hughes (born 5 June 1982) is a British former professional boxer born in Pontefract, West Yorkshire. He now resides in South Shields. He is most notable for defeating the then British Super Bantamweight Champion, Esham Pickering in December 2007. Pickering was on the verge of stepping up to European and even World level before the bout and it was expected to be a routine victory for the Newark champion. However, at the Nottingham Arena in front of the SKY TV cameras Hughes won a points victory over 8 rounds.

In the rematch for the British title on 18 January 2008, Pickering avenged that loss and stopped Hughes in round 9 in a contest which was nominated for fight of the year.

Hughes was an undefeated central area super bantamweight champion who had three British title fights, 2 English titles and an International Boxing Council (IBC) world title fight, and unsuccessfully challenged Jason Booth for the Commonwealth bantamweight title. Hughes was ranked number 1 in Great Britain and in the top 100 in the world in 2007.

Hughes announced his retirement on 7 December 2013 in the ring, after defeat in his bout in Newcastle.
