= Cristóbal Cruz =

Mexican boxer

Personal information
- Nickname: Lacandón
- Born: Cristóbal Cruz Rivera; 19 May 1977 (age 49) Chiapas, Mexico
- Height: 1.70 m (5 ft 7 in)
- Weight: Featherweight

Boxing career
- Stance: Orthodox

Boxing record
- Total fights: 68
- Wins: 41
- Win by KO: 25
- Losses: 22
- Draws: 4

Cristóbal Cruz Rivera, also known as Lacandón (born 19 May 1977) is a Mexican professional boxer and former IBO and IBF featherweight Champion.

== Career ==
On 17 January 1992, Cruz began his professional career, beating fellow Mexican debutant Manuel Morales with a second round knockout in Monterrey.

After racking up 24 fights with 21 wins and 11 knockouts in just over tens years, Cruz faced Francisco Dianzo for the WBC Continental Americas featherweight title. Cruz overcame Dianzo in the eleventh round about would beat him again in 2005 with a 6th-round knockout.

== Road to the IBF title ==
Between October 2005 and May 2007 Cruz's career looked to be coming to an end when he had seven fights with four losses and a no contest including two losses to Francisco Lorenzo.

In August 2007, Cruz started back on the comeback trail when he defeated Alberto Garza with a tenth-round knockout to capture the WBC FECOMBOX featherweight title. This victory lead to a shot at the IBO featherweight title against South African champion Thomas Mashaba who had only one loss in a ten-year 25 fight career. The clash took place in March 2008 at the Foxwoods Casino, Connecticut. The pair fought twelve tough rounds with Cruz having blood running from his nose from the eighth round onwards. In a major upset Cruz finished strongly breaking CompuBox record for punches thrown in a 12-round fight to take the victory by majority decision with one judge calling the fight even and two giving it to Cruz by one solitary round.

In October 2008, Cruz would vacate his newfound IBO title and aim for a bigger prize - the IBF featherweight title - which had been recently vacated by Robert Guerrero who moved up to super featherweight. He faced fellow Mexican Orlando Salido who had won an eliminator less than a year previous and had fought for the title previously, losing to Juan Manuel Márquez in 2004, his only loss since 2001 and a no contest again Guerrero in 2006. Once again Cruz overcame the odds to defeat the bookies favourite to take one of the most prestigious titles in boxing by beating a battered and swollen Salido on points.

He followed this up with a defeat of once-beaten Jorge Solís, avenging a loss earlier in his career.

== Professional boxing record ==
68 fights	41 wins	22 losses
By knockout	25	5
By decision	16	17
Draws	4	
No contests	1	

No.	Result	Record	Opponent	Type	Round, time	Date	Age	Location	Notes
68	Loss	41–22–4 (1)	Luis Solis	UD	8	Jun 17, 2017	40 years, 29 days	Palenque de Gallos, Comitan, Mexico	
67	Loss	41–21–4 (1)	Maurice Hooker	UD	10	Feb 24, 2017	39 years, 281 days	Salon Mezzanine, Tijuana, Mexico	
66	Win	41–20–4 (1)	Manuel Valdez	TKO	7 (10), 1:12	Feb 4, 2017	39 years, 261 days	Auditorio Municipal, Villa Las Rosas, Mexico	
65	Loss	40–20–4 (1)	Luis Ramos Jr.	UD	8	Apr 2, 2016	38 years, 319 days	Oceanview Pavilion, Port Hueneme, California, US	
64	Loss	40–19–4 (1)	Gervonta Davis	TKO	3 (8), 1:31	Oct 30, 2015	38 years, 164 days	The Venue at UCF, Orlando, Florida, US	
63	Loss	40–18–4 (1)	Eddie Ramirez	UD	6	Sep 8, 2015	38 years, 112 days	Hollywood Palladium, Hollywood, California, US	
62	Loss	40–17–4 (1)	Alejandro Luna	UD	8	Jun 6, 2015	38 years, 18 days	StubHub Center, Carson, Mexico	
61	Draw	40–16–4 (1)	Emanuel López	PTS	10	Jun 27, 2014	37 years, 39 days	Comitan, Mexico	
60	Loss	40–16–3 (1)	Fernando Montiel	MD	10	Mar 15, 2014	36 years, 300 days	Palenque, Mexico	
59	Loss	40–15–3 (1)	Miguel Berchelt	TKO	5 (10), 2:25	Aug 31, 2013	36 years, 104 days	Complejo Deportivo La Inalámbrica, Merida, Mexico	
58	Win	40–14–3 (1)	Enrique Lugo	TKO	5 (8), 2:13	Jun 1, 2013	36 years, 13 days	Club de Leones, Guasave, Mexico	
57	Loss	39–14–3 (1)	Javier Fortuna	TKO	2 (10), 2:22	Jul 6, 2012	35 years, 48 days	Hard Rock Hotel and Casino, Las Vegas, Nevada, US	
56	Loss	39–13–3 (1)	Juan Carlos Burgos	UD	10	Feb 24, 2012	34 years, 281 days	Dover Downs Hotel & Casino, Dover, Delaware, US	For WBC silver super featherweight title
55	Draw	39–12–3 (1)	Art Hovhannisyan	TD	4 (10), 2:36	Aug 5, 2011	34 years, 78 days	Chumash Casino, Santa Ynez, California, US	Accidental head clash cuts Cruz over right eye
54	Loss	39–12–2 (1)	Orlando Salido	UD	12	May 15, 2010	32 years, 361 days	Estadio "Tomás Oroz Gaytán, Ciudad Obregon, Mexico	Lost IBF featherweight title
53	Draw	39–11–2 (1)	Ricardo Castillo	TD	3 (12), 1:15	Dec 19, 2009	32 years, 214 days	Palenque de Gallos, Tuxtla Gutierrez, Mexico	Retained IBF featherweight title; Accidental head clash cuts Cruz over left eye
52	Win	39–11–1 (1)	Jorge Solís	UD	12	Jul 11, 2009	32 years, 53 days	Palenque de Gallos, Tuxtla Gutierrez, Mexico	Retained IBF featherweight title
51	Win	38–11–1 (1)	Cyril Thomas	UD	12	Feb 14, 2009	31 years, 271 days	Palais des Sports, Saint-Quentin, France	Retained IBF featherweight title
50	Win	37–11–1 (1)	Orlando Salido	SD	12	Oct 23, 2008	31 years, 157 days	Northern Quest Casino, Airway Heights, Washington, US	Won vacant IBF featherweight title
49	Win	36–11–1 (1)	Thomas Mashaba	MD	12	Mar 7, 2008	30 years, 293 days	Foxwoods Resort, Mashantucket, Connecticut, US	Won IBO featherweight title
48	Win	35–11–1 (1)	Alberto Garza	TKO	10 (12), 2:41	Aug 20, 2007	30 years, 93 days	El Foro, Tijuana, Mexico	Won inaugural WBC FECOMBOX featherweight title
47	Loss	34–11–1 (1)	Zahir Raheem	UD	10	May 18, 2007	29 years, 364 days	Million Dollar Elm Casino, Tulsa, Oklahoma, US	
46	Loss	34–10–1 (1)	Francisco Lorenzo	UD	12	Apr 13, 2007	29 years, 329 days	Cicero Stadium, Cicero, Illinois, US	
45	Win	34–9–1 (1)	Jose Reyes	MD	12	Dec 8, 2006	29 years, 203 days	Kissimmee Civic Center, Kissimmee, Florida, US	Won vacant Fedecentro and Latino super featherweight titles
44	Loss	33–9–1 (1)	Francisco Lorenzo	UD	8	Dec 1, 2006	29 years, 196 days	Cicero Stadium, Cicero, Illinois, US	
43	Win	33–8–1 (1)	Leonardo Resendiz	RTD	5 (10), 3:00	Sep 8, 2006	29 years, 112 days	El Foro, Tijuana, Mexico	Resendiz injured right hand
42	Loss	32–8–1 (1)	Steve Luevano	UD	12	Jul 21, 2006	29 years, 63 days	Mohegan Sun Casino, Uncasville, Connecticut, US	For vacant WBO NABO featherweight title
41	NC	32–7–1 (1)	Gerardo Zayas	NC	4 (10), 1:53	Oct 28, 2005	28 years, 162 days	Orleans Hotel & Casino, Las Vegas, Nevada, US	
40	Win	32–7–1	Francisco Dianzo	TKO	6 (10), 2:27	May 6, 2005	27 years, 352 days	El Foro, Tijuana, Mexico	
39	Win	31–7–1	Luisito Espinosa	KO	3 (10)	Feb 18, 2005	27 years, 275 days	Memorial Civic Auditorium, Stockton, California, US	
38	Win	30–7–1	Jose Navarrete	TKO	4 (10)	Jan 7, 2005	27 years, 233 days	El Foro, Tijuana, Mexico	
37	Win	29–7–1	Cornelius Lock	TKO	8 (10), 2:59	Oct 29, 2004	27 years, 163 days	Orleans Hotel & Casino, Las Vegas, Nevada, US	
36	Win	28–7–1	Mario Flores	UD	6	Oct 8, 2004	27 years, 142 days	Salon Las Pulgas, Tijuana, Mexico	
35	Loss	27–7–1	Jose Miguel Aguiniga	SD	10	Jul 23, 2004	27 years, 65 days	Convention Center, Oxnard, California, US	
34	Win	27–6–1	Julio Cesar Acosta	TKO	1 (6)	Jun 7, 2004	27 years, 19 days	Salon Las Pulgas, Tijuana, Mexico	
33	Loss	26–6–1	Juan Ruiz	UD	12	Feb 27, 2004	26 years, 284 days	Orleans Hotel & Casino, Las Vegas, Nevada, US	For vacant WBA Fedebol super bantamweight title
32	Loss	26–5–1	Jorge Solís	UD	10	Dec 11, 2003	26 years, 206 days	Olympic Auditorium, Los Angeles, California, US	
31	Loss	26–4–1	Heriberto Ruiz	UD	10	Sep 12, 2003	26 years, 116 days	MGM Grand, Las Vegas, Nevada, US	
30	Win	26–3–1	Edgar Barcenas	TKO	9 (10)	Jun 20, 2003	26 years, 32 days	Palenque del Hipódromo de Agua Caliente, Tijuana, Mexico	
29	Win	25–3–1	Eduardo Gutierrez	TKO	3 (?)	Apr 12, 2003	25 years, 328 days	San Luis Rio Colorado, Mexico	
28	Win	24–3–1	Cesar Huizar	RTD	6 (12), 0:10	Mar 21, 2003	25 years, 306 days	Parque Vicente Guerrero, Mexicali, Mexico	Won vacant Baja California super bantamweight title
27	Win	23–3–1	Ricardo Castillo	UD	8	Jan 1, 2003	25 years, 227 days	Gimnasio de Mexicali, Mexicali, Mexico	
26	Loss	22–3–1	Martin Honorio	KO	1 (10), 1:49	Aug 10, 2002	25 years, 83 days	Arena Mexico, Mexico City, Mexico	
25	Win	22–2–1	Francisco Dianzo	TKO	11 (12)	Jan 26, 2002	24 years, 252 days	Tuxtla Gutierrez, Mexico	Won vacant WBC Continental Americas featherweight title
24	Draw	21–2–1	Agustin Lorenzo	PTS	10	Aug 16, 2001	24 years, 89 days	Cunduacan, Mexico	
23	Win	21–2	Ruben Estanislao	PTS	10	Jun 16, 2001	24 years, 28 days	Macuspana, Mexico	
22	Win	20–2	Cristin Rojas	PTS	10	Mar 10, 2001	23 years, 295 days	Mexico City, Mexico	
21	Win	19–2	Nino Gonzalez	PTS	10	Jan 20, 2001	23 years, 246 days	Mexico	
20	Win	18–2	Polo Camacho	PTS	12	Oct 29, 2000	23 years, 163 days	Mexico	
19	Win	17–2	Erelyn Valencia	KO	9 (?)	Jan 31, 1998	20 years, 257 days	Mexico	
18	Loss	16–2	Jose Martinez	PTS	10	Nov 29, 1997	20 years, 194 days	Chihuahua, Mexico	
17	Win	16–1	Luis Espinoza	TKO	7 (?)	Aug 27, 1997	20 years, 100 days	Mexico	
16	Loss	15–1	Manuel Arjona	KO	6 (?)	Apr 19, 1997	19 years, 335 days	Mexico	
15	Win	15–0	Agustin Sanchez	PTS	10	Dec 30, 1996	19 years, 225 days	Ensenada, Mexico	
14	Win	14–0	Frank Lorenzana	TKO	2 (?)	Nov 15, 1996	19 years, 180 days	Ciudad Juarez, Mexico	
13	Win	13–0	Israel Cruz	TKO	2 (?)	Oct 13, 1996	19 years, 147 days	Mexico	
12	Win	12–0	Jose Martinez	PTS	10	Sep 28, 1996	19 years, 132 days	Mexico	
11	Win	11–0	Enrique Zuniga	TKO	9 (10)	Aug 26, 1996	19 years, 99 days	Mexico	
10	Win	10–0	Jose Martin	PTS	10	May 3, 1996	18 years, 350 days	Ciudad Obregon, Mexico	
9	Win	9–0	Eduardo Caballero	TKO	9 (?)	Mar 11, 1996	18 years, 297 days	Mexico	
8	Win	8–0	Humberto Velazquez	TKO	5 (?)	Feb 5, 1996	18 years, 262 days	Mexico	
7	Win	7–0	Jorge Escobar	PTS	8	Dec 25, 1995	18 years, 220 days	Mexico	
6	Win	6–0	Martin Martinez	TKO	3 (?)	Nov 17, 1995	18 years, 182 days	Mexico	
5	Win	5–0	Jose Lara	TKO	3 (?)	Dec 12, 1993	16 years, 207 days	Mexico	
4	Win	4–0	Ceciclio Rios	TKO	5 (?)	Feb 6, 1993	15 years, 263 days	Mexico	
3	Win	3–0	Edwin Armando Zarate	PTS	6	Dec 11, 1992	15 years, 206 days	Mexico	
2	Win	2–0	Sergio Morales	TKO	5 (?)	Nov 27, 1992	14 years, 253 days	Mexico	
1	Win	1–0	Manuel Morales	TKO	2 (?)	Jan 17, 1992	14 years, 243 days	Monterrey, Mexico	

== See also ==
- List of IBF world champions
- List of Mexican boxing world champions

Vacant Title last held by Robert Guerrero	IBF Featherweight Champion; October 23, 2008 – May 15, 2010	Succeeded by Orlando Salido
