= Thomas Mashaba =

South African boxer

Personal information
- Nickname: "The Rock"
- Nationality: South African
- Born: Thomas Mashaba Khutsong, Gauteng, South Africa
- Height: 5 ft 6 in (1.68 m)
- Weight: featherweight

Boxing career
- Reach: 70 cm (28 in)
- Stance: Orthodox

Boxing record
- Total fights: 30
- Wins: 27
- Win by KO: 10
- Losses: 3

Thomas Mashaba (born Khutsong, Gauteng, South Africa) is a professional boxer in the featherweight division holding the lightly regarded IBO title.

His KO over Eric Aiken was voted South Africa's KO of the year 2007 (according to Fightnews). He lost an upset decision to Cristobal Cruz in March 2008, a major setback in his hopes for a title shot.
