= Jorge Lacierva =

Mexican boxer (born 1978)

Jorge Lacierva Medina (born 14 July 1978) is a Mexican former professional boxer who competed from 1994 to 2014, challenging for the IBF super flyweight title in 1999.

He lives and trains Atlanta, Georgia. He is a former IBA Super Bantamweight, Bantamweight, and global boxing union featherweight champion, currently ranked sixth by the World Boxing Association. He also has a son.

== Professional career ==
Known as "Babyface", Lacierva is a former three-division bantamweight, super bantamweight and featherweight champion (also a former WBO NABO Super Bantamweight Champion).
