= Ricardo Castillo (boxer) =

Mexican boxer (born 1979)

Personal information
- Nickname: Piolo
- Born: Ricardo Edgar Castillo; 7 June 1979 (age 47) Empalme, Sonora, Mexico
- Height: 1.74 m (5 ft 9 in)
- Weight: Featherweight

Boxing career
- Reach: 178 cm (70 in)
- Stance: Orthodox

Boxing record
- Total fights: 50
- Wins: 39
- Win by KO: 26
- Losses: 10
- Draws: 1
- No contests: 0

Ricardo Edgar Castillo (born 7 June 1979) is a Mexican professional boxer NABF Featherweight Champion. Ricardo is the younger brother of former world champion, José Luis Castillo.

== Professional career ==
On 19 December 2009, Carrillo fought to a draw against IBF Featherweight champion Cristobal Cruz at the Palenque de Gallos in Tuxtla Gutiérrez, Chiapas, Mexico.

== See also ==
- Notable boxing families
