= Yuriorkis Gamboa =

Cuban world champion boxer (born 1981)

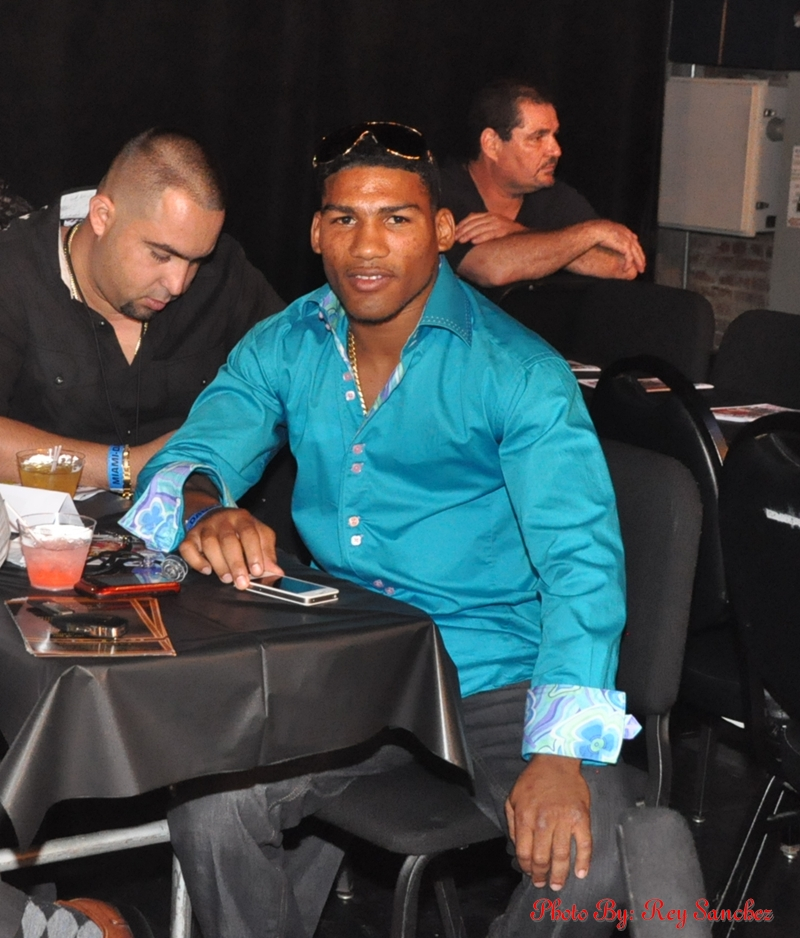
- Gamboa (center) in 2011

Personal information
- Nicknames: El Ciclon de Guantánamo ("The Cyclone from Guantánamo")
- Born: Yuriorkis Gamboa Toledano; 23 December 1981 (age 44) Guantánamo, Cuba
- Height: 5 ft 4 1/2 in (164 cm)
- Weight: Featherweight; Super featherweight; Lightweight

Boxing career
- Reach: 65 in (165 cm)
- Stance: Orthodox

Boxing record
- Total fights: 36
- Wins: 30
- Win by KO: 18
- Losses: 6
Medal record
Men's amateur boxing
Representing Cuba
Olympic Games
Gold medal – first place	2004 Athens	Flyweight
World Championships
Bronze medal – third place	2005 Mianyang	Featherweight
World Cup
Silver medal – second place	2005 Moscow	Featherweight
Gold medal – first place	2006 Baku	Featherweight
Pan American Games
Gold medal – first place	2003 Santo Domingo	Flyweight
Central American and Caribbean Games
Bronze medal – third place	2006 Cartagena	Featherweight
Goodwill Games
Bronze medal – third place	2001 Brisbane	Light flyweight

Yuriorkis Gamboa Toledano (born 23 December 1981) is a Cuban professional boxer. He held the World Boxing Association (WBA) featherweight title (Regular version) from 2009 to 2011, and the International Boxing Federation (IBF) featherweight title from 2010 to 2011. As an amateur, he won a gold medal in the flyweight division at the 2004 Olympics, and a bronze in the featherweight division at the 2005 World Championships.

== Amateur highlights ==
- Four-time Cuban national champion
- 2003 Pan American Games gold medalist
- 2004 Olympic gold medalists
- 2005 World Amateur Boxing Championships bronze medalist
- 2006 Central American and Caribbean Games bronze medalist
- 2006 World Cup champion

Gamboa's 2004 Olympic Boxing results were:

- Round of 32 – Defeated Igor Samoilenco of Moldava – PTS (46–33)
- Round of 16 – Defeated Somjit Jongjohor of Thailand – PTS (26–21)
- Quarterfinals – Defeated Georgy Balakshin of Russia – PTS (26–18)
- Semifinals – Defeated Rustamhodza Rahimov of Germany – PTS (20–11)
- Gold Medal Match – Defeated Jérôme Thomas of France – PTS (38–23)

== Defection ==
While training in Venezuela, Gamboa, along with Cuban teammates Odlanier Solís and Yan Bartelemí, snuck out of camp and found their way to Colombia and eventually to Germany, where they applied for visas to enter the United States. Before defecting, he had sold his Olympic gold medal to support his family.

== Professional career ==
=== Debut in Germany ===
Gamboa made his professional boxing debut on 27 April 2007, in Hamburg, Germany against Alexan Manvelyan. He prepared for his pro debut and his next seven fights with technical specialist Manny Masson. Gamboa put Manvelyan on the canvas in the third round and won via unanimous decision victory. Two months later, he defeated Araik Sachbazjan when Sachbazjan retired before the beginning of round four.

=== Debut in the United States ===
After winning his first four fights in Germany, Gamboa made his United States debut on 30 October 2007, at the Seminole Hard Rock Hotel and Casino in Hollywood, Florida, against Adailton De Jesus, who was dropped to the canvas halfway through the first round. A Gamboa slip in the fourth round was ruled a knockdown by the referee. Gamboa's relentless pressure eventually forced a stoppage in the sixth and final round.

Gamboa fought Gilberto Luque on 5 January 2008, at Bally's Hotel & Casino in Atlantic City, New Jersey. Gamboa sent his opponent to the canvas less than 30 seconds into first round with a left hand. After two more knockdowns, the referee stopped the fight. On 22 February 2008, in Fort Lauderdale, Florida, he made his American television debut against Johnnie Edwards. Gamboa knocked Edwards down in the first 30 seconds of the fight after connecting with a left hand to the head. Edwards got up, but was met with left-hand punches from Gamboa, ending with two consecutive right hands that knocked Edwards down for the second and final time as the referee moved in and halted the fight in round one. Gamboa won the vacant WBC-NABF super featherweight title.

On 17 May 2008, at Buffalo Bill's Star Arena in Primm, Nevada, Gamboa fought Darling Jimenez. Gamboa started off well in the first three rounds of the fight, swarming Jimenez and hitting him with punches over and over but got careless and was knocked down by a right hand behind the ear from Jimenez. Gamboa got up and finished the fight strong, winning by unanimous decision and claiming the vacant WBC International super featherweight title. After the fight, Gamboa's promoter Ahmet Öner fired Gamboa's trainer Osmiri Fernandez, replacing him with Ismeal Salas. On 18 July 2008, stepping down to featherweight, Gamboa scored a first-round technical knockout (TKO) victory over Al Seeger to win the vacant WBO-NABO featherweight title at Buffalo Bill's Star Arena. A left hook to the body set up a right hand that landed across Seeger's face, causing him to collapse backwards flat onto the canvas. The referee stepped over Seeger without bothering to count, officially stopping the bout.

On 5 October 2008, Gamboa stepped up in class and fought Marcos Ramirez, a Kansas City featherweight in Temecula, California. Gamboa exhibited amazing hand speed and quick combination punching in the first round before he was dropped by Ramirez. Gamboa quickly came to his feet and resumed fighting until the bell rang to signify the end of the round. In the second round, Gamboa picked up where he left off and knocked Ramirez down with a fast right uppercut, followed by another combination. Ramirez let the referee administer the eight count before rising to his feet. Gamboa then finished the fight by pressuring Ramirez into the ropes and landing a left hook to the body, followed by a right uppercut to the jaw. Gamboa's next fight took place at Buffalo Bill's Star Arena on 9 January 2009 against Roger Gonzalez. Gamboa used quick combinations from the beginning of the third round to relentlessly attack Gonzalez. Gamboa began his assault after going down during the second round, after absorbing a sneaky right hand by Gonzalez. The referee halted the one-sided bout with 48 seconds remaining after Gonzalez sustained a barrage of punches to the head. Gamboa led 89–82 on one judge's scorecard and 89–83 on the other two judges' cards through nine rounds.

On 20 February 2009, Gamboa fought Walter Estrada at The University Center at Nova Southeastern University. Gamboa knocked out Estrada with a left hook to the body followed by a right hand to the face 25 seconds into the fight.

=== Featherweight ===
On 17 April 2009 Gamboa stopped Jose Rojas via tenth-round TKO to win the WBA interim featherweight title. On 10 October 2009 Gamboa stopped Whyber Garcia in the fourth round to win the WBA featherweight title.

On 23 January 2010, at the WaMu Theater in Madison Square Garden, he defeated Rogers Mtagwa in two rounds. Gamboa buzzed Mtagwa several times from several angles and scored a knockdown in the final ten seconds with a counter hook. He continued the damage in the second round, battering Mtagwa and sending him down two more times before the fight was stopped. On 27 March 2010 at Hamburg, Germany Gamboa dominated Argentinian boxer Jonathan Victor Barros in twelve rounds to retain the WBA featherweight title with a unanimous decision.

==== Gamboa vs. Salido ====
On 11 September 2010, Gamboa fought The Ring No. 3 ranked featherweight Orlando Salido to unify the WBA and IBF featherweight titles with the result being Gamboa winning by unanimous decision. Salido knocked down Gamboa in the eighth round. Gamboa knocked Salido down twice in the twelfth round, but was docked two points for hitting Salido in the back of his head while Salido was down. With this win Gamboa became the first Cuban boxer to hold the IBF world title since the organization's inception.

==== Gamboa vs. Solís ====
On 26 March 2011 Gamboa fought Jorge Solís to defend his WBA featherweight title. Although the fight was originally agreed to contest both of Gamboa's WBA and IBF featherweight titles, Gamboa missed a mandatory re-weighing procedure established by the IBF which resulted in the title being withdrawn. The fight lasted only four rounds after Gamboa sent Solis to the floor a total of five times, causing referee David Fields to stop the fight, giving Gamboa the victory by TKO. After the fight, Gamboa was interviewed, a moment that Gamboa took advantage of to express his awareness and support towards the victims of Japan's latest earthquake and tsunami. Gamboa also took the opportunity to proclaim his desire to fight higher caliber featherweight boxers such as Indonesian Chris John and Puerto Rican Juan Manuel López, who was attending the fight as a spectator and decided to come up to the ring and proclaim his desire for a possible fight with Gamboa as he also made the observation that it was a business decision to be taken by their shared promoter Bob Arum.

==== Gamboa vs. de León ====
On 10 September 2011, Gamboa fought Ring top 10 ranked featherweight Daniel Ponce de León in a non-title fight. Gamboa managed to connect more punches in every round to keep the scorecards in his favor. Although there were not many exchanges, Gamboa's hand speed and reflexes were on display as he connected with quick and short combinations and managed to avoid some of de León's left swings with his characteristic upper body movement. In the eighth round, during a short exchange, Gamboa and de León accidentally clashed heads, resulting in de León suffering a cut to his forehead, consequently the referee stopped the fight and asked de León's corner to check the boxer's wound. After having tried and failed to stop the bleeding it was determined by de León's team that their fighter was unable to continue in the fight.

On 26 October 2011, Gamboa hired world-famous Emanuel Steward as his head trainer. Gamboa was initially set to return in April 2012 against lightweight champion Brandon Rios, but he pulled out of the bout citing problems with his contract with Top Rank. After a long dispute between Gamboa and Top Rank, the two sides agreed to part ways, with Gamboa's contract being bought out for a flat fee. In July 2012, Gamboa signed a promotional contract with 50 Cent and Floyd Mayweather's promotional company, The Money Team Promotions.

=== Super featherweight ===
After the 50 Cent-Mayweather TMT Promotions never came to fruition, 50 Cent decided to make his own promotional company SMS Promotions and officially signed Gamboa. 50 Cent worked with Top Rank's Bob Arum and Mayweather's rival Manny Pacquiao. Gamboa then landed a fight on the undercard of Manny Pacquiao vs. Juan Manuel Márquez IV on 8 December 2012. He fought Michael Farenas, who fought to a draw in his previous fight with WBA title holder Takashi Uchiyama. Gamboa was show boating throughout the fight while Farenas maintained his focus. Farenas was dropped twice which gave Gamboa more confidence, dropping his hands occasionally. In the ninth round Gamboa tried to finish Farenas off with a barrage of punches but Farenas countered him with a left hook that dropped Gamboa. Gamboa stopped show boating after the ninth round, winning the fight by unanimous decision.

=== Performance-enhancing drug scandal ===
As he was moving up to lightweight, Gamboa was linked to performance-enhancing drugs through the Biogenesis scandal, which included Alex Rodriguez.

=== Lightweight ===
Gamboa eventually moved up in weight to take on undefeated Darleys Pérez (28–0) for the vacant WBA interim lightweight title. Gamboa dropped Pérez in the first round and easily won most of the follow-up rounds, Yuriorkis continued to have success on the outside winning almost all the middle rounds as well. Gamboa although fighting at an unusually measured pace at times consistently beat Pérez to the punch amassing a clear lead in the bout. Pérez came alive momentarily to drop Gamboa in the eleventh but this was ruled a slip and Yuriorkis Gamboa won a comfortable unanimous decision improving to 23–0.

==== Gamboa vs. Crawford ====
On 28 June 2014 Gamboa faced off against undefeated WBO titlist Terence Crawford on HBO Boxing After Dark. Gamboa got off to a hot start, winning the first four rounds and using his superior foot speed and hand speed but was caught and dropped by a right hook in the fifth round. Gamboa continued to fight back but was dropped again in the eighth and finally was stopped in the ninth round after two knockdowns and a huge right hook by Crawford. "We were just two warriors in the ring trying to get the victory, and he won." stated Gamboa after the bout. This was Gamboa's first loss as a professional ending his undefeated streak.

==== Career from 2014 ====
After losing to Crawford, Gamboa started to become less active. He won three straight fights before suffering an upset loss against Robinson Castellanos. Gamboa faced Jason Sosa on 25 November 2017 stepping in as a late replacement for Robinson Castellanos, Yuriorkis won a controversial majority decision. On 27 July 2019, Gamboa fought Roman Martinez. Gamboa knocked out Martinez in the second round.

==== Gamboa vs. Davis ====
On 28 December 2019, Gamboa fought Gervonta Davis for the vacant WBA (Regular) lightweight title. Davis was ranked #1, while Gamboa was ranked #2 at lightweight by the WBA. Davis knocked down Gamboa three times en route to a twelfth-round technical knockout win.

==== Gamboa vs. Haney ====
In his next fight, Gamboa challenged Devin Haney for his WBC lightweight title. Gamboa was ranked #10 by the WBC, while Haney was the world's number two lightweight according to The Ring magazine rankings. Haney completely outboxed Gamboa en route to a unanimous decision victory, 120–107, 120–107 and 118–109 on the scorecards.

== Bare-knuckle boxing ==
In February 2026, Gamboa signed a contract with BKB Bare Knuckle Boxing.

== Professional boxing record ==
35 fights	30 wins	5 losses
By knockout	18	4
By decision	12	1

No.	Result	Record	Opponent	Type	Round, time	Date	Location	Notes
36	Loss	30–6	Alexander Espinoza	SD	8	30 May 2026	War Memorial Auditorium, Fort Lauderdale, Florida, U.S.	
35	Loss	30–5	Isaac Cruz	TKO	5 (10), 1:32	16 Apr 2022	AT&T Stadium, Arlington, Texas, U.S.	For vacant WBO Inter-Continental lightweight title
34	Loss	30–4	Devin Haney	UD	12	7 Nov 2020	Hard Rock Live, Hollywood, Florida, U.S.	For WBC lightweight title
33	Loss	30–3	Gervonta Davis	TKO	12 (12), 1:17	28 Dec 2019	State Farm Arena, Atlanta, Georgia, U.S.	For vacant WBA (Regular) lightweight title
32	Win	30–2	Román Martínez	KO	2 (10), 2:00	27 Jul 2019	Royal Farms Arena, Baltimore, Maryland, U.S.	
31	Win	29–2	Miguel Beltrán Jr.	UD	10	10 Nov 2018	Marlins Park, Miami, Florida, U.S.	
30	Win	28–2	Jason Sosa	MD	10	25 Nov 2017	The Theater at Madison Square Garden, New York City, New York, U.S.	
29	Win	27–2	Alexis Reyes	MD	10	12 Aug 2017	Arena Oasis, Cancún, Mexico	
28	Loss	26–2	Robinson Castellanos	RTD	7 (10), 3:00	5 May 2017	Cosmopolitan of Las Vegas, Paradise, Nevada, U.S.	
27	Win	26–1	René Alvarado	UD	10	11 Mar 2017	Turning Stone Resort Casino, Verona, New York, U.S.	
26	Win	25–1	Hylon Williams Jr.	UD	10	19 Dec 2015	Turning Stone Resort Casino, Verona, New York, U.S.	
25	Win	24–1	Joel Montes de Oca	TKO	6 (10), 1:13	15 Nov 2014	Plaza de Toros, Cancún, Mexico	
24	Loss	23–1	Terence Crawford	KO	9 (12), 2:53	28 Jun 2014	CenturyLink Center, Omaha, Nebraska, U.S.	For WBO lightweight title
23	Win	23–0	Darleys Pérez	UD	12	8 Jun 2013	Bell Centre, Montreal, Quebec, Canada	Won WBA vacant interim lightweight title
22	Win	22–0	Michael Farenas	UD	12	8 Dec 2012	MGM Grand Garden Arena, Paradise, Nevada, U.S.	Won WBA interim super featherweight title
21	Win	21–0	Daniel Ponce de León	TD	8 (12), 1:24	10 Sep 2011	Boardwalk Hall, Atlantic City, New Jersey, U.S.	Unanimous TD after de León cut from accidental head clash
20	Win	20–0	Jorge Solís	TKO	4 (12), 1:31	26 Mar 2011	Boardwalk Hall, Atlantic City, New Jersey, U.S.	Retained WBA (Unified) and IBF featherweight titles
19	Win	19–0	Orlando Salido	UD	12	11 Sep 2010	Pearl Concert Theater, Paradise, Nevada, U.S.	Retained WBA (Unified) featherweight title; Won vacant IBF featherweight title
18	Win	18–0	Jonathan Victor Barros	UD	12	27 Mar 2010	Alsterdorfer Sporthalle, Hamburg, Germany	Retained WBA (Regular) featherweight title
17	Win	17–0	Rogers Mtagwa	KO	2 (12), 2:35	23 Jan 2010	The Theater at Madison Square Garden, New York City, New York, U.S.	Retained WBA (Regular) featherweight title
16	Win	16–0	Whyber Garcia	TKO	4 (12), 0:58	10 Oct 2009	The Theater at Madison Square Garden, New York City, New York, U.S.	Retained WBA (Regular) featherweight title
15	Win	15–0	Jose Rojas	TKO	10 (12), 1:31	17 Apr 2009	Star of the Desert Arena, Primm, Nevada, U.S.	Won vacant WBA interim featherweight title
14	Win	14–0	Walter Estrada	KO	1 (8), 0:35	20 Feb 2009	Don Taft University Center, Fort Lauderdale, Florida, U.S.	
13	Win	13–0	Roger Gonzalez	TKO	10 (10), 2:12	9 Jan 2009	Star of the Desert Arena, Primm, Nevada, U.S.	
12	Win	12–0	Marcos Ramirez	KO	2 (10), 1:41	4 Oct 2008	Pechanga Resort & Casino, Temecula, California, U.S.	
11	Win	11–0	Al Seeger	TKO	2 (10), 2:30	18 Jul 2008	Star of the Desert Arena, Primm, Nevada, U.S.	Won vacant WBO–NABO featherweight title
10	Win	10–0	Darling Jimenez	UD	10	17 May 2008	Star of the Desert Arena, Primm, Nevada, U.S.	Won vacant WBC International super featherweight title
9	Win	9–0	Johnnie Edwards	TKO	1 (10), 1:34	22 Feb 2008	Xtreme Action Park, Fort Lauderdale, Florida, U.S.	Won vacant NABF super featherweight title
8	Win	8–0	Gilberto Luque	TKO	1 (8), 1:54	5 Jan 2008	Bally's, Atlantic City, New Jersey, U.S.	
7	Win	7–0	Adailton de Jesus	TKO	6 (6), 0:35	30 Oct 2007	Hard Rock Live, Hollywood, Florida, U.S.	
6	Win	6–0	Samuel Kebede	TKO	2 (6), 2:11	19 Oct 2007	Estrel Hotel, Berlin, Germany	
5	Win	5–0	Nestor Hugo Paniagua	KO	1 (6), 1:05	21 Sep 2007	Hansehalle, Lübeck, Germany	
4	Win	4–0	Thomas Hengstberger	TKO	1 (4), 1:04	2 Sep 2007	Universal Hall, Berlin, Germany	
3	Win	3–0	Joel Mayo	TKO	2 (4), 0:35	6 Jul 2007	Arena Gym, Hamburg, Germany	
2	Win	2–0	Araik Sachbazjan	RTD	3 (6), 3:00	16 Jun 2007	Atatürk Sport Hall, Ankara, Turkey	
1	Win	1–0	Alexan Manvelyan	UD	4	27 Apr 2007	Arena Gym, Hamburg, Germany	

Sporting positions
Regional boxing titles
Vacant Title last held by Agnaldo Nunes	NABF super featherweight champion 22 February 2008 – May 2008; Vacated	Vacant Title next held by Urbano Antillon
Vacant Title last held by Manny Pacquiao	WBC International super featherweight champion 17 May 2008 – July 2008; Vacated	Vacant Title next held by Roy Mukhlis
Vacant Title last held by Rafael Valenzuela	WBO–NABO featherweight champion 18 July 2008 – October 2008; Vacated	Vacant Title next held by Cornelius Lock
World boxing titles
Vacant Title last held by Chris John	WBA featherweight interim champion 17 April – 27 June 2009; Promoted	Vacant Title next held by Javier Fortuna
Vacant Title last held by Chris John	WBA featherweight champion Regular title 27 June 2009 – 11 September 2010; Promoted	Vacant Title next held by Jonathan Victor Barros
Preceded by Chris John declared champion in recess	WBA featherweight champion 11 September 2010 – 5 December 2010; Relegated	Next: Chris John reinstated as Super champion
Vacant Title last held by Orlando Salido	IBF featherweight champion 11 September 2010 – 26 March 2011; Stripped	Vacant Title next held by Billy Dib
Vacant Title last held by Juan Manuel Márquez	WBA featherweight champion Unified title 5 December 2010 – 11 June 2011	Title discontinued
Vacant Title last held by Bryan Vázquez	WBA super featherweight champion Interim title 8 December 2012 – June 2013; Vacated	Vacant Title next held by Bryan Vázquez
Vacant Title last held by Robert Guerrero	WBA lightweight champion Interim title 8 June 2013 – June 2014; Vacated	Vacant Title next held by Darleys Pérez
