= Bernabe Concepcion =

Filipino boxer

Personal information
- Nicknames: The Real Deal; Kamaong Llave ("Wrench Fist")
- Nationality: (Philippines) Filipino
- Born: Bernabe Concepcion; January 20, 1988 (age 38) Virac, Catanduanes, Philippines
- Height: 5 ft 4 in (1.63 m)
- Weight: Featherweight

Boxing career
- Stance: Orthodox

Boxing record
- Total fights: 43
- Wins: 34
- Win by KO: 20
- Losses: 7
- Draws: 2

Bernabe "Abe" Concepcion (born 1988) is a retired Filipino featherweight boxer. Concepcion resides in Rizal, Viga, Catanduanes, Philippines. Being from a boxing-oriented family, he trained from a young age. He turned professional at the age of 16.

== Early life ==
Concepcion has two older brothers who were also professional boxers. They were his inspiration for having taken up boxing himself. He started boxing at an early age, watching his brothers at first and eventually training with them. He then went into amateur boxing but almost immediately turned professional when he turned 16.

== Professional career ==
=== Oriental bantamweight ===
He capture the vacant WBO Oriental super bantamweight title on July 31, 2015, at the 12,000-seater Cuneta Astrodome in Pasay, Philippines against Tanzanian boxer Juma Fundi.

=== Super bantamweight ===
Having developed his boxing skill in his early life, by 2005, he was considered to be a promising boxing talents. Today, Concepcion fights mainly in the United States, carving out wins away from his homeland Philippines

He won his first title via KO in China against a Chinese hometown boxer, and gained his two recent belts in the United States against rated opposition. During this first professional bout, he gained his first knockdown, but was able to floor his veteran opponent as well in the early rounds of that fight (Concepcion was 17 years of age at the time). A year later, he won the WBC youth super bantamweight title by scoring a unanimous decision win over a then undefeated opponent, Joksan "El Torito" Hernandez.

Bob Arum immediately signed Concepcion up for Top Rank Boxing following this win.

=== Featherweight ===
For his first world title shot, Concepcion took on Steven Luevano for the WBO featherweight title on August 15, 2009. Originally, the fight was supposed to be included in the undercard of the May 2, 2009 bout between Manny Pacquiao and Ricky Hatton but Luevano pulled out due to an injury. Instead, Concepcion fought Colombian Yogli Herrera that night and managed to eke out a 6-round decision.

Concepcion lost his title bout against Steven Luevano via disqualification. Luevano was ahead on the scorecards when Concepcion landed late blows after the seventh round, resulting in a disqualification.

On February 13, 2010, Concepcion faced Puerto Rican Mario “Principe Ponceño” Santiago at the Las Vegas Hilton in Paradise, Nevada. The Filipino boxer won the 10-round bout by unanimous decision with the scores 98–91, 96–93, 97–92. Concepcion was also able to knock the opponent down in the 6th-round with a powerful right. This win brought Concepcion to a potential fight against Puerto Rican sensation Juan Manuel López.

Bernabe Concepcion fought for the WBO featherweight championship again on July 10, 2010. This time, he took on Juan Manuel Lopez who won the belt from Luevano. In the opening round, Concepcion was floored by Lopez but rose back up to respond with a knockdown of his own. In the next round where the bout concluded, Concepcion was brought down by Lopez twice, prompting the referee to call a halt to the match. This was Concepcion's first defeat by stoppage. In response to the outcome of the match, Manny Pacquiao, who coached him in the days leading to the fight, blamed Concepcion for not taking his (Pacquiao's) advice. Bernabe Concepcion is now going to fight Alejandro Perez 14-2-1 9KOs on the undercard to the showtime super fight between Juan Manuel Lopez vs. Rafael Marquez.

== Professional boxing record ==
| 43 fights | 34 wins | 7 losses |
|---|---|---|
| By knockout | 20 | 2 |
| By decision | 14 | 4 |
| By disqualification | 0 | 1 |
| Draws | 2 | |

| No. | Result | Record | Opponent | Type | Round, Time | Date | Location | Notes |
|---|---|---|---|---|---|---|---|---|
| 43 | Loss | 34–7–2 | Jimmy Paypa | SD | 12 | 12 Mar 2016 | Yñares Sports Arena, Pasig City, Philippines | Lost WBO Oriental super bantamweight title |
| 42 | Win | 34–6–2 | Juma Fundi | TKO | 2 (12), 0:56 | 31 Jul 2015 | Cuneta Astrodome, Pasay City, Philippines | Won vacant WBO Oriental super bantamweight title |
| 41 | Win | 33–6–2 | Rasmanudin | KO | 2 (10), 2:10 | 23 Jan 2015 | Fortuno Civic Center, Nabua, Philippines | |
| 40 | Draw | 32–6–2 | Eden Sonsona | TD | 3 (10), 2:22 | 26 Jul 2014 | Mandaluyong Gym, Mandaluyong Sports Center, Mandaluyong City, Philippines | Fight stopped due to a cut on Concenpcion's right eyelid caused by an accidental headbutt in round 3 |
| 39 | Win | 32–6–1 | Boido Simanjuntak | RTD | 7 (10), 3:00 | 21 Apr 2013 | Muntinlupa Sports Complex, Barangay Tunasan, Muntinlupa City, Philippines | |
| 38 | Win | 31–6–1 | Richard Olisa | KO | 2 (10), 0:31 | 13 Oct 2012 | Batangay City Coliseum, Batangas City, Philippines | |
| 37 | Loss | 30–6–1 | Mikey Garcia | TKO | 7 (10), 2:33 | 10 Mar 2012 | Coliseo Roberto Clemente, San Juan, Puerto Rico | For NABF and NABO featherweight titles |
| 36 | Win | 30–5–1 | Aaron Garcia | SD | 10 | 27 Oct 2011 | San Miguel Indian Casino, Highland California | |
| 35 | Loss | 29–5–1 | Juan Carlos Martinez | SD | 8 | 6 May 2011 | Mandalay Bay Resort & Casino, Paradise, Nevada, U.S. | |
| 34 | Loss | 29–4–1 | Juan Manuel López | TKO | 2 (12), 2:37 | 10 Jul 2010 | Coliseo Jose Miguel Agrelot, San Juan, Puerto Rico | For WBO featherweight title |
| 33 | Win | 29–3–1 | Mario Santiago | UD | 10 | 13 Feb 2010 | Las Vegas Hilton, Las Vegas, U.S. | |
| 32 | Loss | 28–3–1 | Steven Luevano | DQ | 7 (12), 3:00 | 15 Aug 2009 | Hard Rock Hotel and Casino, Paradise, Nevada U.S. | For WBO featherweight title;Concepcion disqualified after he hit Luevano after the bell ringed to end the 7th round |
| 31 | Win | 28–2–1 | Yogli Herrera | UD | 6 | 2 May 2009 | MGM Grand Garden Arena, Paradise, Nevada, U.S. | |
| 30 | Win | 27–2–1 | Sande Otieno | TD | 5 (12), 3:00 | 11 Jan 2009 | Araneta Coliseum, Barangay Cubao, Quezon City, Philippines | Won vacant WBC International featherweight title;Otieno sustains a cut above his right eye and his nose also begun to bleed both caused by punches, after consulting with the ring physician and Otieno's corner, Bruce McTavish stops the contest |
| 29 | Win | 26–2–1 | Giovanni Caro | KO | 8 (10), 2:35 | 25 Sep 2008 | Sycuan Resort & Casino, El Cajon, U.S. | |
| 28 | Win | 25–2–1 | Adam Carrera | TKO | 3 (10), 2:14 | 26 Jul 2008 | MGM Grand Garden Arena, Paradise, Nevada, U.S. | |
| 27 | Win | 24–2–1 | Torrence Daniels | TKO | 2 (10), 2:42 | 26 Apr 2008 | Plaza de Toros Juriquilla, Queretaro, Mexico | Defended NABF super bantamweight title |
| 26 | Win | 23–2–1 | Juan Ruiz Jr. | UD | 12 | 9 Feb 2008 | Domo De La Feria, Leon, Mexico | Defended NABF super bantamweight title |
| 25 | Win | 22–2–1 | Salvador Garcia | TKO | 9 (10), 0:47 | 4 Oct 2007 | Hard Rock Hotel and Casino, Paradise, Nevada, U.S. | |
| 24 | Win | 21–2–1 | Gabriel Elizondo | TKO | 4 (10), 2:11 | 4 Aug 2007 | Allstate Arena, Rosemont, U.S. | Won vacant NABF super bantamweight title |
| 23 | Win | 20–2–1 | Benjamín Flores | UD | 10 | 14 Apr 2007 | Alamodome, San Antonio, U.S. | Defended WBC Youth super bantamweight title |
| 22 | Win | 19–2–1 | Jae Choon Moon | TKO | 4 (10), 2:59 | 25 Feb 2007 | Baguio City Convention Center, Baguio City, Philippines | |
| 21 | Win | 18–2–1 | Joksan Hernandez | UD | 10 | 18 Nov 2006 | Thomas & Mack Center, Las Vegas, U.S. | Won vacant WBC Youth super bantamweight title |
| 20 | Win | 17–2–1 | Sonny Gonzalez | UD | 10 | 17 Sep 2006 | Cantada Sports Center, Barangay Bagumbayan, Taguig City, Philippines | |
| 19 | Win | 16–2–1 | Ariel Delgado | TD | 5 (10), 2:27 | 22 Jul 2006 | Ynares Plaza Gymnasium (Covered Court), Binangonan, Philippines | Concepcion suffered a significant cut which caused fight to be charged as technical decision |
| 18 | Win | 15–2–1 | Jojo Arnado | KO | 1 (10), 2:55 | 26 Jun 2006 | Salceda Sports Complex, Polangui, Philippines | |
| 17 | Win | 14–2–1 | Jake Verano | SD | 10 | 20 May 2006 | Ynares Plaza Gymnasium (Covered Court), Binangonan, Philippines | |
| 16 | Win | 13–2–1 | Rey Martizano | TKO | 1 (10), 1:35 | 23 Apr 2006 | Cantada Sports Center, Barangay Bagumbayan, Taguig City, Philippines | |
| 15 | Win | 12–2–1 | Jiang Weiyang | KO | 7 (10) | 24 Feb 2006 | Shanghai, China | |
| 14 | Win | 11–2–1 | Rico Genon | TKO | 6 (10) | 7 Jan 2006 | Provincial Capitol Grounds, Cagayan de Oro City, Philippines | |
| 13 | Draw | 10–2–1 | Alex Escaner | SD | 12 | 10 Dec 2005 | St. Lucia East Mall, Cainta, Philippines | For GAB super bantamweight title |
| 12 | Win | 10–2 | Noel Sungahid | KO | 1 (10) | 27 Aug 2005 | Mandaluyong Gym, Mandaluyong Sports Center, Mandaluyong City, Philippines | |
| 11 | Win | 9–2 | Flash Murillo | TKO | 1 (10), 2:59 | 25 Jun 2005 | Pag-asa Gym, Binangonan, Philippines | |
| 10 | Win | 8–2 | Elden Dela Cruz | KO | 1 (10), 2:50 | 2 May 2005 | Tagudin Covered Court, Tagudin, Philippines | |
| 9 | Loss | 7–2 | Mark Sales | MD | 10 | 5 Mar 2005 | Cantada Sports Center, Barangay Bagumbayan, Taguig City, Philippines | |
| 8 | Win | 7–1 | Sonny Gonzalez | KO | 4 (8), 0:42 | 12 Feb 2005 | Mandaluyong Gym, Mandaluyong Sports Center, Mandaluyong City, Philippines | |
| 7 | Win | 6–1 | Danilo Logramonte | KO | 1 (8), 0:44 | 3 Jan 2005 | Palaez Sports Center, Cagayan de Oro City, Philippines | |
| 6 | Win | 5–1 | Edgar Gabejan | UD | 8 | 21 Oct 2004 | Cantada Sports Center, Barangay Bagumbayan, Taguig City, Philippines | |
| 5 | Win | 4–1 | Felix Manalansan | UD | 6 | 28 Aug 2004 | Angono Sports Complex (Angono Municipal Gym), Barangay Mahabang, Angono, Philippines | |
| 4 | Win | 3–1 | Chris Dujali | UD | 6 | 4 Jul 2004 | Ynares Sr. Memorial Gym, Binangonan, Philippines | |
| 3 | Loss | 2–1 | Richard Garcia | MD | 6 | 23 Apr 2004 | Mandaluyong Gym, Mandaluyong Sports Center, Mandaluyong City, Philippines | |
| 2 | Win | 2–0 | Jerry Duaso | TKO | 3 (4), 1:25 | 28 Mar 2004 | Ynares Sr. Memorial Gym, Binangonan, Philippines | |
| 1 | Win | 1–0 | George Zerrudo | MD | 4 | 14 Feb 2004 | Mandaluyong Elementary School, Mandaluyong City, Philippines | |
