= Jorge Solís =

Mexican boxer (born 1979)

Personal information
- Nickname: Coloradito ("Colorful")
- Born: Jorge Iván Solís Pérez; 23 October 1979 (age 46) Guadalajara, Jalisco, Mexico
- Height: 5 ft 8 in (173 cm)
- Weight: Super bantamweight; Featherweight; Super featherweight

Boxing career
- Reach: 69 in (175 cm)
- Stance: Orthodox

Boxing record
- Total fights: 48
- Wins: 41
- Win by KO: 30
- Losses: 4
- Draws: 2
- No contests: 1

Jorge Iván Solís Pérez (born 23 October 1979) is a Mexican former professional boxer. He is a former holder of various minor and regional titles including, the Jalisco State Featherweight title, Mexican Super Bantamweight and Featherweight divisions and WBA Fedecentro titles. He's also the brother of former IBF Champion Ulises Solís.

== Professional career ==
Solís started his professional boxing career in 1998 at 112 pounds at the age of 19. His early fights usually took place in Mexico. His first professional fight was a four-round bout against Bernardo Tule (2-1-0) on February 6, 1998, which Solís won via technical knockout (TKO).

His first fight in the United States was against Juan Jose Mendez (3-2-1) on September 2, 2000 in the Don Haskins Center, El Paso, Texas, which he won in the 6th round by technical knockout.

On October 27, 2001 Solís faced Ruben Estanislao (13-3-1) for the Mexican Super Bantamweight Championship, which he won and defended it against Jorge Munoz (22-17-2), Sammy Ventura (17-8-0) and Fernando Alanis (16-14-3).

On June 6, 2003 Solis faced Wilson Alcorro (20-4-2) for the WBC Latin America Super Featherweight Title but the bout ended in a draw.

In September 2004, Solis fought future champion Humberto Soto (35-5-2) in a bout which resulted in a "no contest" decision. Solis was knocked to the canvas by Soto in the third round, but the fight was stopped later in the round after Solis suffered a cut due to an accidental clash of heads. Humberto Soto, who was ahead on all scorecards, disputed the outcome claiming that the cut was the result of a punch and not a head clash.

=== Solis vs Pacquiao ===
On April 14, 2007, Solis faced off against reigning WBC International Super-Featherweight champion, then three-division world champion Manny Pacquiao (43-3-2) in San Antonio, Texas. Solis provided a tougher challenge than expected, however, Pacquiao proved too much for the number four ranked challenger. Pacquiao unleashed a barrage of lethal punches to knock out the unbeaten Solis in the eighth round. In the Philippines, this match was called as The Blaze of Glory.

After being beaten by Pacquiao, Jorge defeated Santiago Allione (13-4-0) at the Arena Coliseo in Guadalajara by technical knockout. On January 31, 2009 in Zapopan, Jalisco, Solís scored a fifth-round technical knockout of Monty Meza Clay (28-1-0) in an IBF title eliminator.

=== Solis vs Cruz ===
On July 11, 2009, Solis challenged IBF featherweight champion Cristobal Cruz (38-11-1), whom Solis had previously defeated, but lost by unanimous decision. During the bout, Solis was docked 4 points for intentional low blows while Cruz was docked two points for headbutting. The final scores were 113-110, 113-110, and 113-111 in favor of Cruz. Solis moved up to the Super Featherweight division in his next bout and defeated Likar Ramos by 7th-round TKO to claim the WBA interim Super featherweight title.

On May 8, 2010, Solis defended his interim title against Mario Santiago by a wide unanimous decision on the under-card of Latin Fury 14.

=== Gamboa vs Solis ===
On March 26, 2011, Solis got a chance to take on the Unified WBA World and IBF Featherweight Champion Yuriorkis Gamboa (19-0, 15 KO's). Solis was completely and utterly dominated by Gamboa and was knocked out in the fourth round in what was a dazzling display of boxing skills from Gamboa.

== Professional boxing record ==
| 48 fights | 41 wins | 4 losses |
|---|---|---|
| By knockout | 30 | 3 |
| By decision | 11 | 1 |
| Draws | 2 | |
| No contests | 1 | |

| No. | Result | Record | Opponent | Type | Round, time | Date | Location | Notes |
|---|---|---|---|---|---|---|---|---|
| 48 | Loss | 41–4–2 (1) | Takashi Uchiyama | TKO | 11 (12) | 2011-12-31 | Bunka Gym, Yokohama, Japan | For WBA super-featherweight title |
| 47 | Loss | 41–3–2 (1) | Yuriorkis Gamboa | TKO | 4 (12) | 2011-03-26 | Boardwalk Hall, Atlantic City, New Jersey, U.S. | For WBA (Regular) & vacant IBF featherweight titles |
| 46 | Win | 41–2–2 (1) | Francisco Cordero | TKO | 6 (12) | 2010-09-04 | Coliseo Olímpico, Guadalajara, Mexico | Retained Interim WBA super-featherweight title |
| 45 | Win | 40–2–2 (1) | Mario Santiago | UD | 12 | 2010-05-08 | Feria Nacional de San Marcos, Aguascalientes, Mexico | Retained Interim WBA super-featherweight title |
| 44 | Win | 39–2–2 (1) | Likar Ramos Concha | KO | 7 (12) | 2010-02-06 | Complejo Deportivo La Inalámbrica, Mérida, Mexico | Won Interim WBA super-featherweight title |
| 43 | Loss | 38–2–2 (1) | Cristóbal Cruz | UD | 12 | 2009-07-11 | Palenque de Gallos, Tuxtla Gutiérrez, Mexico | For IBF featherweight title |
| 42 | Win | 38–1–2 (1) | Monty Meza Clay | TKO | 5 (12) | 2009-01-31 | Telmex Auditorium, Zapopan, Mexico | |
| 41 | Win | 37–1–2 (1) | Jorge Samudio | TKO | 4 (12) | 2008-09-15 | Arena México, Mexico City, Mexico | |
| 40 | Win | 36–1–2 (1) | Miguel Román | UD | 10 | 2008-05-17 | Plaza Monumental, Aguascalientes, Mexico | |
| 39 | Win | 35–1–2 (1) | Santiago Allione | KO | 4 (10) | 2007-08-18 | Coliseo Olímpico, Guadalajara, Mexico | |
| 38 | Loss | 34–1–2 (1) | Manny Pacquiao | KO | 8 (12) | 2007-04-14 | Alamodome, San Antonio, Texas, U.S. | For WBC International super-featherweight title |
| 37 | Win | 34–0–2 (1) | Fernando Omar Lizarraga | TKO | 5 (10) | 2007-01-25 | The Orleans, Paradise, Nevada, U.S. | |
| 36 | Win | 33–0–2 (1) | Lizardo Moreno | UD | 10 | 2006-07-21 | Arena Coliseo, Guadalajara, Mexico | |
| 35 | Win | 32–0–2 (1) | Adalberto Borquez Covarrubias | RTD | 3 (10) | 2006-04-08 | Apache Gold Casino, Globe, Arizona, U.S. | |
| 34 | Win | 31–0–2 (1) | Hector Javier Marquez | UD | 10 | 2006-01-14 | Emerald Queen Casino, Tacoma, Washington, U.S. | |
| 33 | Win | 30–0–2 (1) | Nicky Bentz | TKO | 5 (12) | 2005-07-01 | American Bank Center, Corpus Christi, Texas, U.S. | Retained Mexican featherweight title |
| 32 | Win | 29–0–2 (1) | Hector Javier Marquez | UD | 12 | 2005-02-25 | Arena Coliseo, Guadalajara, Mexico | Retained Mexican featherweight title |
| 31 | Win | 28–0–2 (1) | Martin Fing | TKO | 9 (10) | 2004-12-17 | Arena Coliseo, Guadalajara, Mexico | |
| 30 | NC | 27–0–2 (1) | Humberto Soto | NC | 3 (10) | 2004-09-17 | The Orleans, Paradise, Nevada, U.S. | |
| 29 | Win | 27–0–2 | Martín Sánchez | KO | 4 (12) | 2004-06-25 | Arena Coliseo, Guadalajara, Mexico | Retained Mexican featherweight title |
| 28 | Win | 26–0–2 | Orlando Soto | TKO | 3 (12) | 2004-03-19 | Civic Center, Kissimmee, Florida, U.S. | |
| 27 | Win | 25–0–2 | Cristóbal Cruz | UD | 10 | 2003-12-11 | Grand Olympic Auditorium, Los Angeles, California, U.S. | |
| 26 | Win | 24–0–2 | Wilson Alcorro | UD | 12 | 2003-11-07 | Civic Center, Kissimmee, Florida, U.S. | |
| 25 | Win | 23–0–2 | Jose Luis Tula | UD | 12 | 2003-09-18 | Santa Ana Stadium, Santa Ana, California, U.S. | Won vacant Mexican featherweight title |
| 24 | Draw | 22–0–2 | Wilson Alcorro | SD | 12 | 2003-06-06 | Miccosukee Resort & Gaming, Miami, Florida, U.S. | For vacant WBC Latino super-featherweight title |
| 23 | Win | 22–0–1 | Jose Mura | TKO | 5 (?) | 2002-09-28 | Tepic, Mexico | |
| 22 | Win | 21–0–1 | Fernando Alanis | KO | 5 (12) | 2002-07-21 | Tepic, Mexico | Retained Mexican super-bantamweight title |
| 21 | Win | 20–0–1 | Samuel Ventura | KO | 5 (12) | 2002-04-06 | Villahermosa, Mexico | Retained Mexican super-bantamweight title |
| 20 | Win | 19–0–1 | Jorge Munoz | TKO | 6 (12) | 2001-12-21 | Mexico | Retained Mexican super-bantamweight title |
| 19 | Win | 18–0–1 | Ruben Estanislao | MD | 12 | 2001-10-27 | Mexico City, Mexico | Won Mexican super-bantamweight title |
| 18 | Win | 17–0–1 | Miguel Ochoa | TKO | 2 (12) | 2001-08-24 | Arena Coliseo, Guadalajara, Mexico | |
| 17 | Win | 16–0–1 | Ernesto Fuentes | TKO | 3 (?) | 2001-03-02 | Mexico | |
| 16 | Win | 15–0–1 | Oscar Galindo | TKO | 3 (?) | 2000-10-13 | Mexico | |
| 15 | Win | 14–0–1 | Juan Jose Mendez | TKO | 6 (?) | 2000-09-02 | Don Haskins Center, El Paso, Texas, U.S. | |
| 14 | Win | 13–0–1 | Hector Mancina | KO | 3 (10) | 2000-07-16 | Guadalajara, Mexico | |
| 13 | Win | 12–0–1 | Miguel Ochoa | KO | 1 (?) | 2000-06-16 | Guadalajara, Mexico | |
| 12 | Win | 11–0–1 | Alfredo de Jesus Mendez | TKO | 5 (10) | 2000-02-25 | Guadalajara, Mexico | |
| 11 | Win | 10–0–1 | Juan Manuel Chavez | KO | 6 (?) | 1999-12-17 | Arena Coliseo, Guadalajara, Mexico | |
| 10 | Win | 9–0–1 | Israel Gonzalez Bringas | TKO | 1 (?) | 1999-10-22 | Guadalajara, Mexico | |
| 9 | Win | 8–0–1 | Ricardo Sanchez | TKO | 3 (?) | 1999-07-30 | Arena Coliseo, Guadalajara, Mexico | |
| 8 | Win | 7–0–1 | Enrique Zavala | TKO | 3 (?) | 1999-06-25 | Guadalajara, Mexico | |
| 7 | Win | 6–0–1 | Enrique Zavala | UD | 8 | 1999-03-26 | Guadalajara, Mexico | |
| 6 | Win | 5–0–1 | Pedro Ayala | KO | 2 (?) | 1998-11-06 | Mexico | |
| 5 | Draw | 4–0–1 | Juan Carlos Brena | PTS | 4 | 1998-09-05 | Mexico City, Mexico | |
| 4 | Win | 4–0 | Hector Mancina | PTS | 6 | 1998-07-10 | Guadalajara, Mexico | |
| 3 | Win | 3–0 | Jaime Nava | TKO | 3 (4) | 1998-06-06 | Mexico City, Mexico | |
| 2 | Win | 2–0 | Gilberto Arellano | TKO | 1 (4) | 1998-02-27 | Arena Coliseo, Guadalajara, Mexico | |
| 1 | Win | 1–0 | Bernardo Tule | TKO | 3 (4) | 1998-02-06 | Mexico | |

== Pay-per-view bouts ==
United States
| Date | Fight | Billing | Buys | Network | Revenue |
|---|---|---|---|---|---|
| April 14, 2007 | Pacquiao vs. Solís | Blaze of Glory | 150,000 | Top Rank | $5,992,000 |

== See also ==
- List of male boxers
- Notable boxing families

Sporting positions
Regional boxing titles
| Preceded by Ruben Estanislao | Mexican super-bantamweight champion October 27, 2001 - 2003; Vacated | Vacant Title next held by Adrian Valdez |
| Vacant Title last held by Jose Luis Tula | Mexican featherweight champion September 18, 2003 - 2005; Vacated | Vacant Title next held by Carlos Garcia |
World boxing titles
| Preceded by Likar Ramos Concha | WBA super-featherweight champion Interim title February 6, 2010 – November 2011; Vacated | Vacant Title next held by Bryan Vázquez |
