= Manny Pacquiao vs. Ricky Hatton =

2009 boxing match

The Battle of East and West
- Date: 2 May 2009
- Venue: MGM Grand Garden Arena, Las Vegas, Nevada, U.S.
- Title(s) on the line: IBO and The Ring light welterweight titles

Tale of the tape
Boxer	Manny Pacquiao	Ricky Hatton
Nickname	Pac-Man	The Hitman
Hometown	General Santos, Soccsksargen, Philippines	Stockport, Greater Manchester, UK
Pre-fight record	48–3–2 (36 KO)	45–1 (32 KO)
Age	30 years, 4 months	30 years, 6 months
Height	5 ft 6 1/2 in (169 cm)	5 ft 6 in (168 cm)
Weight	138 lb (63 kg)	140 lb (64 kg)
Style	Southpaw	Orthodox
Recognition	The Ring No. 1 ranked pound-for-pound fighter 5-division world champion	IBO and The Ring light welterweight champion The Ring No. 8 ranked pound-for-pound fighter 2-division world champion

Result
- Pacquiao wins via 2nd-round KO

Manny Pacquiao vs. Ricky Hatton, billed as The Battle of East and West, was a professional boxing match for the IBO and The Ring light welterweight championship between Manny Pacquiao of General Santos, Philippines and Ricky Hatton of Manchester, United Kingdom. The bout was held on 2 May 2009 at the MGM Grand in Las Vegas, Nevada, United States and drew 1.75 million pay-per-view buys.

Pacquiao defeated Hatton by knockout in the second round. It was named Knockout of the Year by The Ring magazine. Pacquiao's victory made him, at the time, one of only two boxers (the other being Oscar De La Hoya) to win a world title in six different weight divisions; Pacquiao would later win a world title in an unprecedented seventh weight division on 14 November 2009 against Miguel Cotto and another in an eighth weight division on 13 November 2010 against Antonio Margarito.

== Negotiations ==
With Pacquiao winning his bout against Oscar De La Hoya, Ricky Hatton was seen as the next opponent for Pacquiao. At mid-December, both boxers verbally agreed on a 50% split of the proceeds; however, Pacquiao changed his decision to a favorable 60%–40% split of the pay-per-view (PPV) revenues, while Hatton wanted an even 50% split. Pacquiao's promoter Bob Arum of Top Rank Boxing said on 22 January that the fight "was off", citing Pacquiao's decision not to sign the contract. Arum increased Pacquiao's guaranteed purse to US$12 million from $11 million and a 52%–48% split. Pacquiao's camp asked for "more demands and the deal fell apart", he said.

On 23 January, Pacquiao officially signed the contract of the 2 May fight vs Hatton. Pacquiao signed the contract with the 52%–48% split, in favour of him, and a $12 million purse.

== Pre-fight hype ==
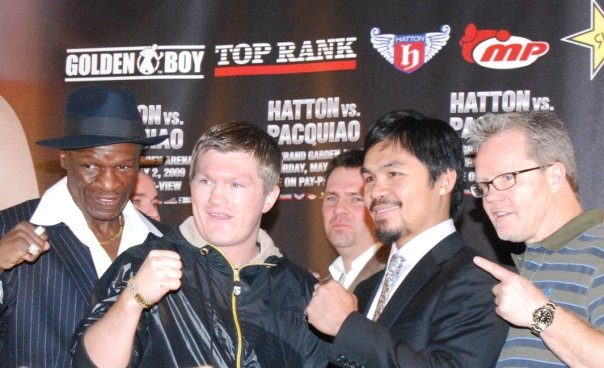
Hatton and Pacquiao with their trainers, Floyd Mayweather Sr. and Freddie Roach, at the Press Conference at The Trafford Centre in Manchester.

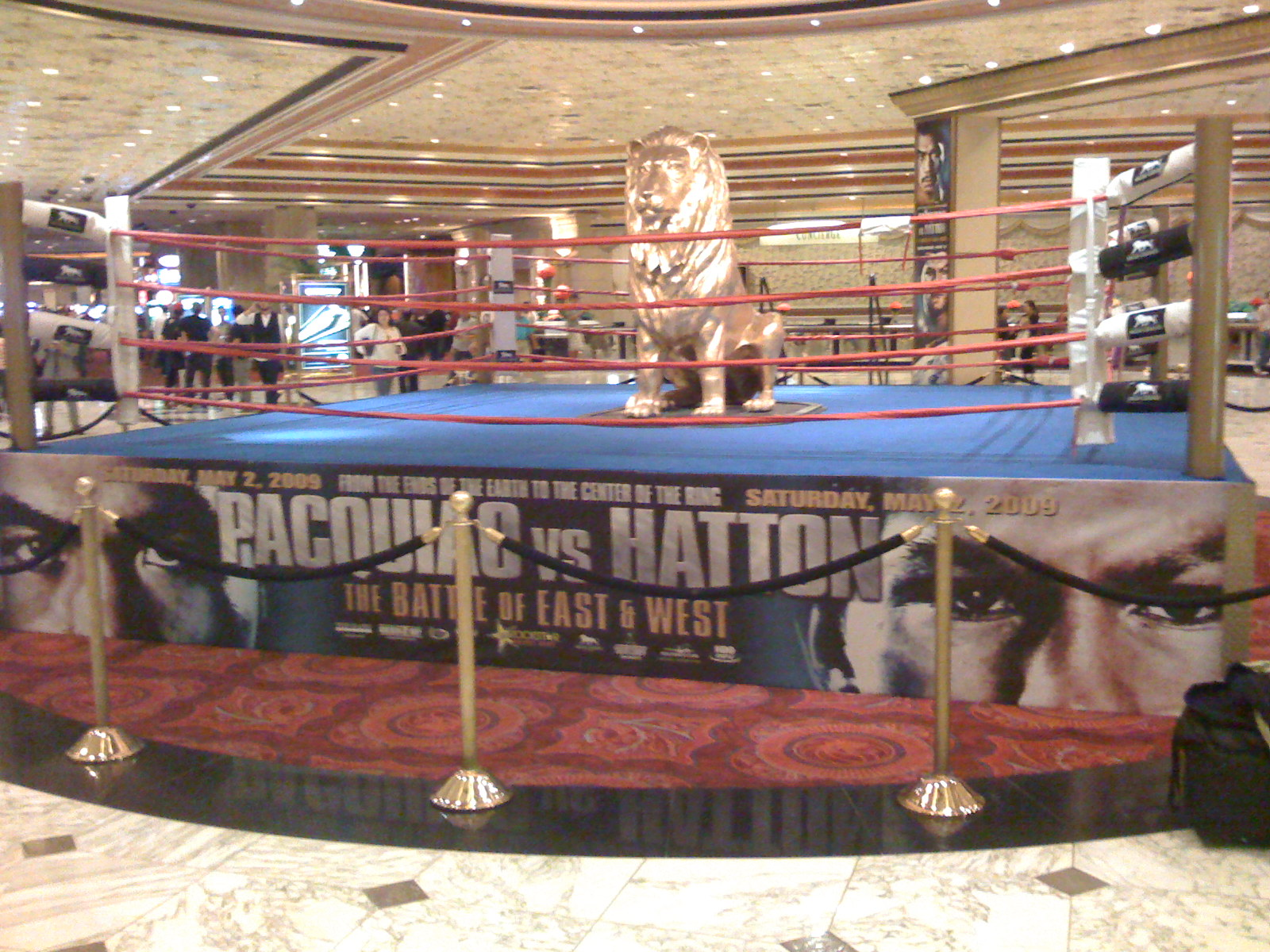
The pre-fight ring for Hatton vs. Pacquiao. This was built up in the foyer of the MGM.

Pacquiao and Hatton toured the United Kingdom for the promotion of their fight; while in the UK, Hatton beat Pacquiao in a game of darts. Hatton presented Pacquiao a Manchester City F.C. shirt after the game.

Martin Nievera was chosen to sing the Lupang Hinirang, the Philippine national anthem, for Pacquiao's battle against Hatton. He was the first ever male singer to sing the anthem at a Pacquiao bout. Also, WWE star Batista led Pacquiao to the ring. Sir Tom Jones sang "God Save the Queen" while American-raised Filipino-Mexican Jasmine Villegas sang "The Star-Spangled Banner."

As support for the fight, HBO aired "Pacquiao/Hatton: 24/7" for two weeks prior to the fight on television and on the internet; it aired in the Philippines on GMA the night before the fight on 2 May.

On 22 April, Hatton labelled Pacquiao as a one-dimensional fighter: "Manny fights the same way all the time. He's effective at what he does but he's not a versatile fighter". Pacquiao's trainer Freddie Roach shot back at Hatton saying his "Hitman" tag is accurate "because on May 2, Hatton is going to get hit, man, and a lot!" Roach also predicted that the fight wouldn't last for more than three rounds. Pacquiao also took a break from training at the Wildcard Gym in Los Angeles to throw a ceremonial first pitch at the San Francisco Giants-San Diego Padres Major League Baseball game at the AT&T Park in San Francisco as part of the annual Filipino Heritage Night.

At the 30 April press conference, the last before the fight, Hatton admitted that he was the underdog for the fight, but insisted he could still cause an upset. "I can understand I am the underdog but it doesn't scare me", adding that "He is the best pound for pound fighter but this is my weight division". He continued, "This fat, beer drinking Englishman is going to shock the world again". Pacquiao was picked by Las Vegas bookmakers as the favorite prior to the fight.

Hatton expected, and got, 25,000 British fans to come and support him. This fight was Hatton's fifth in Las Vegas in less than 2½ years, and the MGM Grand Garden Arena sold out.

Prior to the bout, it was reported that Hatton's camp was in "turmoil", with Roach's source saying that "Hatton was miserable with Mayweather and was unhappy that Mayweather had arrived late for several workouts." Mayweather had addressed his issues with Hatton, his co-trainer Lee Beard, but wouldn't disclose the issues. Hatton had earlier said that he is happy with Mayweather, with whom he replaced his long-time trainer Billy Graham.

Some have embraced the fact that Hatton and Pacquiao did not engage in any kind of rampant antagonism during the pre-fight hype, as is most characterized by Floyd Mayweather Jr.; examples being his bouts against Oscar De La Hoya, where he mocked and abused his opponent in front of him, and Hatton, where some physical jostling was not unheard of. While both did try and downsize the other, there was a friendly and cordial atmosphere to the fighters' meetings, especially in Manchester.

== Broadcasting ==
ABS-CBN's advertisement for their airing of the bout; ABS-CBN previously aired several Pacquiao bouts before he went back to Solar.

=== Pay-per-view ===
Pacquiao vs. Hatton was broadcast as a pay-per-view produced by HBO. In the United States, the fight reportedly attracted around 850,000 buys, bringing in at least $50 million in revenue.

In Hatton's home country, the United Kingdom, the fight generated 900,000 buys on Sky Box Office. At a pay-per-view price of £14.63, the fight generated a pay-per-view revenue of £13.2 million ($21.2 million) on Sky Box Office.

In both the US and UK, the fight sold a total of 1.75 million pay-per-view buys. Combined with the live gate revenue of $8.85 million, the fight grossed a total revenue of $80.2 million from the live gate and pay-per-view.

=== Philippine TV rights ===
In Pacquiao's home country of the Philippines, a contractual dispute developed over broadcast rights to the fight. Initially, Solar Sports was expected to be the holder of broadcast rights to the fight; airing it first on its pay-per-view channel Solar All-Access, with repeat airings afterward on the Solar Sports channel and GMA Network. However, on 16 March, rumors surfaced reporting that Solar Sports would not air the fight, and that Pacquiao had made a new deal with a "giant" network to air the match. Two days later, Pacquiao officially announced that he had reached a deal with ABS-CBN to serve as the broadcaster of the fight. Details of this contract were not disclosed.

It was later revealed that Pacquiao had terminated his contract with Solar Sports because it had been delaying the payments of 60 million pesos it was expected to make per-bout for the broadcast rights under the contract, which was originally supposed to last until 2011. However, Solar countered, claiming that "Pacquiao has no reasons [to leave] because we have settled all our [financial] obligations with him." In response, Solar filed a lawsuit against both Pacquiao and ABS-CBN, seeking 150 million pesos in damages. A representative for ABS-CBN countered the filing of the lawsuit, saying that it would fight to protect Pacquiao's wishes. Solar denied claims that Pacquiao broke off from their deal because of delayed payments, adding that what they had not forwarded to the fighter were the "advance payments" he was seeking. After Pacquiao requested that Solar provide its financial records related to the deal, Solar distributed copies of its agreement with the boxer at a press conference—however, the financial details of the agreement were omitted from the documents. Solar executives went to Los Angeles to meet with Pacquiao to resolve the issues.

However, after meeting with Solar executives, Pacquiao announced that he and Solar had "favorably resolved their unfortunate misunderstanding". Furthermore, through his lawyer, Pacquiao said that neither party violated the contract and that it is valid and binding. Pacquiao furthermore apologized to his fans for any confusion that may have been caused by his decision to cut and then renew his ties with Solar Entertainment; ABS-CBN said for its part "we will not stand in the way if he decides to change his mind".

== Bout ==
In front of a sellout crowd of 16,262, mostly consisting of Hatton supporters, Pacquiao began by landing three straight rights on Hatton. Pacquiao subsequently knocked Hatton down with a right hook, with a minute to go in the first round. Hatton rose at the count of eight, but Pacquiao knocked Hatton down a second time, with nine seconds remaining in the first round, after he breached Hatton's defences again with a quick combination followed by a strong left.

In the second round, Pacquiao landed with two looping rights and a vicious left-right-left combination. Hatton tried to stem the tide by holding onto Pacquiao's head midway through the round, but Pacquiao finally ended the contest by hitting Hatton with a heavy left hook, knocking Hatton unconscious 2:59 into round two.

Hatton was rendered unconscious before he had even hit the ground, and referee Kenny Bayless later said: "I didn't have to count." Hatton laid on the canvas for several minutes before getting up; he was eventually taken to a local hospital for a precautionary brain scan.

Over the two rounds, Pacquiao landed 73 out of his 127 punches, including 65 power punches, while Hatton connected on 18 of 78 punches, which included 2 jabs.

== Aftermath ==
Pacquiao's win made him one of only two (the other being Oscar De La Hoya) to win six world championships in six different weight divisions at that time (he won his seventh world title in seventh weight division on 14 November 2009 against Miguel Cotto). The knockout won him the Ring Magazine knockout of the year for 2009.

The defeat was the second in Hatton's career but also his second in four fights, after a defeat to Floyd Mayweather Jr.; his mixed performances, combined with the speed of the defeat to Pacquiao, led some to call for Hatton to retire.

The fight had a deep effect on Ricky Hatton. In one of his revelations, Hatton admitted that he contemplated suicide after losing to Pacquiao. The fight also forced Hatton to retire.

== Undercard ==
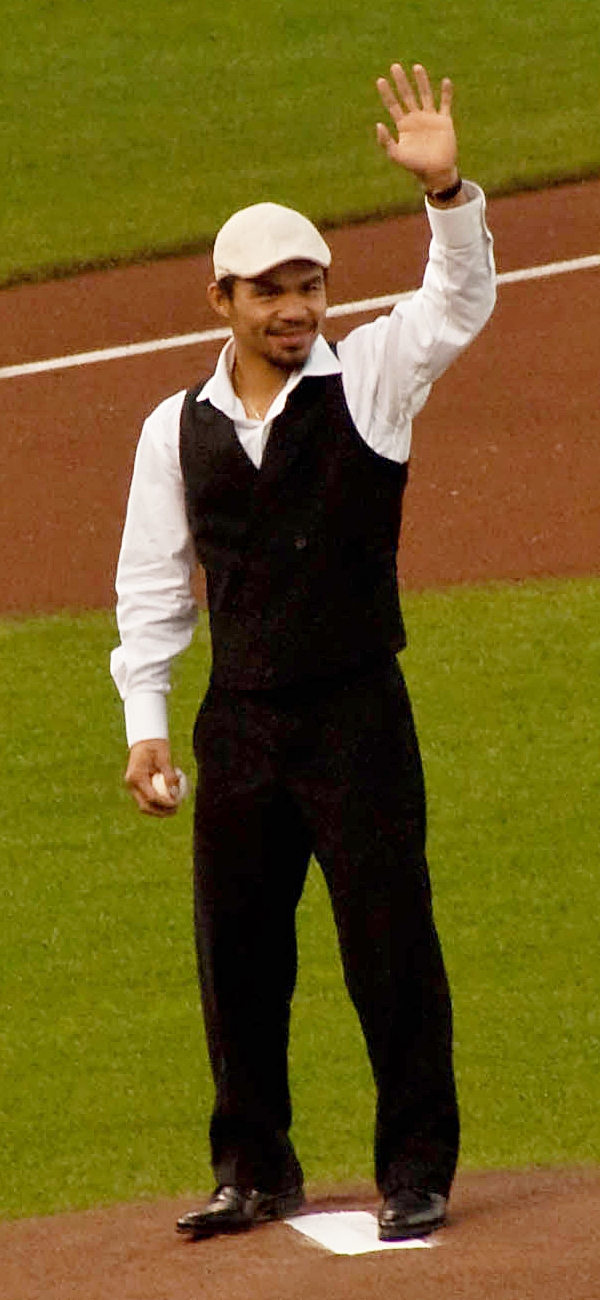
Pacquiao threw a ceremonial first pitch at AT&T Park on 21 April 2009.

Confirmed bouts:

Winner	Loser	Weight division/title belt(s) disputed	Result
(Mexico) Humberto Soto (c)	(Canada) Benoit Gaudet	WBC super featherweight title	9th round TKO.
(United States) Daniel Jacobs*	(United States) Michael Walker	Middleweight (10 rounds)	Unanimous decision.
(Russia) Matt Korobov	(United States) Anthony Bartinelli	Middleweight (4 rounds)	2nd round TKO.
(United States) Erislandy Lara	(United States) Chris Gray	Junior middleweight (4 rounds)	Unanimous decision.
Non-TV bouts
(United Kingdom) Matthew Hatton	(Mexico) Ernesto Zepeda	Welterweight (6 rounds)	Unanimous decision.
(United States) Mike Alvarado	(United States) Joaquin Gallardo	Welterweight (8 rounds)	Unanimous decision.
(Mexico) Abner Mares	(Colombia) Jonathan Perez	Bantamweight (8 rounds)	6th round TKO.
(Philippines) Bernabe Concepcion	(Colombia) Yogli Herrera	Featherweight (6 rounds)	Unanimous decision.
(Mexico) Omar Chávez	(United States) Tyler Zlolowski	Junior welterweight (4 rounds)	2nd round KO.
(United Kingdom) Joe Murray	(Mexico) Missael Nunez	Lightweight (4 rounds)	Unanimous decision.

*James Kirkland (USA) was supposed to fight Walker in the undercard but his arrest on a weapons charge caused him to be struck off the card. Daniel Jacobs (USA) was chosen to fight Walker instead.

Preceded by vs. Paulie Malignaggi	Ricky Hatton's bouts 2 May 2009	Succeeded by vs. Vyacheslav Senchenko
Preceded by vs. Oscar De La Hoya	Manny Pacquiao's bouts 2 May 2009	Succeeded by vs. Miguel Cotto
