= Juan Manuel López vs. Rafael Márquez =

Boxing match

Puerto Rico vs. Mexico
- Date: November 6, 2010
- Venue: MGM Grand, Las Vegas, Nevada, U.S.
- Title(s) on the line: WBO featherweight title

Tale of the tape
Boxer	(Puerto Rico) Juan Manuel López	(Mexico) Rafael Márquez
Nickname	"Juanma"	
Hometown	Rio Piedras, Puerto Rico	Mexico City, Distrito Federal, Mexico
Pre-fight record	29–0 (26 KO)	39–5 (35 KO)
Age	27 years, 4 months	35 years, 7 months
Height	5 ft 7 in (170 cm)	5 ft 5 in (165 cm)
Weight	125 1/2 lb (57 kg)	125 1/2 lb (57 kg)
Style	Orthodox	Orthodox
Recognition	WBO; Featherweight Champion; 2-division world champion	WBO; No. 2 Ranked Featherweight; 2-division world champion

Result
- Lopez defeats Marquez via technical knockout in the eighth round

Juan Manuel López vs Rafael Márquez, billed as Puerto Rico vs. Mexico, was a professional boxing match contested on November 6, 2010, for the WBO featherweight championship. The fight was highly anticipated due to the history of competition between Mexican boxers and those from Puerto Rico.

== Background ==
The fight was originally scheduled for September 18 but postponed due to an injury Marquez sustained on his right thumb. The fight was rescheduled for November 6, which was Lopez's second defense of his WBO title and was broadcast on Showtime.

== The fight ==
Marquez lost the fight in the 8th round by TKO after he was unable to continue due to a shoulder injury. Marquez had chosen to proceed with the bout even though he suffered with a right shoulder injury before the contest because he did not wish to cause a second delay. It was later revealed that Marquez had suffered a hairline fracture in his right shoulder blade during the fight and would require six months to recover from the injury. Despite the loss Marquez expressed his eagerness to face Lopez in a rematch.

== Televised ==
- Featherweight bout: (Puerto Rico) Juan Manuel Lopez vs. (Mexico) Rafael Márquez

Lopez defeated Marquez via technical knockout in the eighth round. Marquez was unable to continue following the eighth round citing a shoulder injury.

- Super Middleweight bout: (United States) Allan Green vs. (Jamaica) Glen Johnson

Johnson defeats Green via knockout in the eighth round.

== Untelevised ==
- Lightweight bout: (Mexico) Marvin Quintero vs. (Nigeria) Daniel Attah

Attah defeated Quintero via knockout in the second round.

- Super Featherweight bout: (United States) Diego Magdaleno vs. (United States) Derrick Campos

Magdaleno defeated Campos via technical knockout in the fourth round.

- Lightweight bout: (United States) Mickey Bey vs. (Puerto Rico) Eric Cruz

Bey Jr defeated Cruz via unanimous decision (60-53, 59-53, 59-53).

- Flyweight bout: (Puerto Rico) McWilliams Arroyo vs. (Mexico) Cesar Grajeda

Arroyo defeated Grajeda via technical knockout in the first round.

- Light Welterweight bout: (United States) Dany Escobar vs. (United States) Anthony Lenk

Lenk defeated Escobar via unanimous decision.

- Featherweight bout: (United States) Jesus Magdaleno vs. (United States) Matthew Salazar

Magdaleno defeated Salazar via technical knockout in the first round. This was Magdaleno's professional debut.

== International broadcast ==
Country	Broadcaster
Albania	SuperSport 1
Argentina	TyC Sports
Australia	Main Event
Brazil	SporTV
Canada	Viewers Choice
Chile	ESPN+
Czech Republic	Sport 1
Denmark	TV2 Sport
Fiji	Sky Pacific
France	Canal+
Germany	Sky Sport 1
Greece	Nova Sports 4
Hungary	Sport 2
Italy	Sky Calcio 12
Malaysia	Astro SuperSport 2
Mexico	Canal 5
New Zealand	SKY Box Office 200
Philippines	*ABS-CBN (free-to-air, via satellite on November 7); Studio 23 (replay on November 8)
Poland	Polsat Sport Extra
Portugal	SPORT TV2
Qatar	Al Jazeera Sports 1
Romania	Sport.ro
Russia	NTV Plus Sport
Slovakia	Sport 1
South Africa	SuperSport 2
Spain	Taquilla 3
Ukraine	Sport 1
United Kingdom	Sky Sports 1, Sky Sports 1 HD
United States	HBO PPV
United States	Movie Theaters via NCM Fathom
United States	US Military via AFN Sports
Venezuela	Meridiano

- ABS-CBN is the official television network of the entry to the ABS-CBN Sports presents Top Rank boxing series.

Preceded by vs. Bernabé Concepción	Juan Manuel López's bouts 6 November 2010	Succeeded by vs. Orlando Salido
Preceded by vs. Rafael Márquez IV	Rafael Márquez's bouts 6 November 2010	Succeeded by vs. Eduardo Becerril
