= Manny Pacquiao vs. Erik Morales III =

Boxing match

The Grand Finale
- Date: November 18, 2006
- Venue: Thomas & Mack Center, Paradise, Nevada, U.S.
- Title(s) on the line: WBC International super featherweight title

Tale of the tape
Boxer	Manny Pacquiao	Erik Morales
Nickname	"Pac-Man"	El Terrible ("The Terrible")
Hometown	General Santos, Soccsksargen, Philippines	Tijuana, Baja California, Mexico
Pre-fight record	42–3–2 (33 KO)	48–4 (34 KO)
Age	27 years, 11 months	30 years, 2 months
Height	5 ft 6 1/2 in (169 cm)	5 ft 8 in (173 cm)
Weight	129 lb (59 kg)	129 lb (59 kg)
Style	Southpaw	Orthodox
Recognition	WBA/WBC/WBO/The Ring; No. 1 Ranked Super Featherweight; WBC International super featherweight champion The Ring No. 3 ranked pound-for-pound fighter 3-division world champion	IBF; No. 4 Ranked Super Featherweight; WBA; No. 6 Ranked Super Featherweight; The Ring; No. 3 Ranked Super Featherweight; 3-division world champion

Result
- Pacquiao wins via 3rd-round KO

Manny Pacquiao vs. Erik Morales III, billed as The Grand Finale, was a professional boxing match contested on November 18, 2006, for the WBC International super featherweight championship.

== Background ==
The bout took place at the Thomas & Mack Center, Las Vegas, Nevada, United States and was distributed by HBO PPV. The bout is the last of the Pacquiao-Morales trilogy, widely considered one of the greatest boxing trilogies of all time. The fight also marked a return to HBO for Pacquiao, and the first fight in his four-year contract with Top Rank as his promoter.

== The fight ==
Similar to the second fight, Pacquiao entirely dominated the fight, scoring a total of three knockdowns to knock out Morales in the third round.

== Aftermath ==
The winner of the fight was supposed to become the mandatory challenger of WBC super featherweight champion Marco Antonio Barrera, but it was cancelled due to a legal dispute between Top Rank and Golden Boy Promotions.

== Undercard ==
Confirmed bouts:

== Broadcasting ==
Country	Broadcaster
United States	HBO

Preceded by vs. Óscar Larios	Manny Pacquiao's bouts 18 November 2006	Succeeded by vs. Jorge Solís
Preceded by vs. Manny Pacquiao II	Erik Morales's bouts 18 November 2006	Succeeded by vs. David Díaz
