= Main Bout, Inc. =

Former American boxing promotional company

- Company type: Privately held company
- Industry: Boxing promotion
- Founded: 1965; 61 years ago
- Founder: Jim Brown; Mike Malitz; Bob Arum
- Successor: Sports Action, Inc. (1967); Top Rank, Inc. (1973)
- Headquarters: New York, U.S.
- Key people: Jabir Herbert Muhammad; John Ali; Muhammad Ali

Main Bout, Inc. was a former American boxing promotional company founded to promote Muhammad Ali, which was incorporated in 1966.

== History ==
Main Bout, Inc. was a company founded for the benefit of Muhammad Ali, then heavyweight champion, in 1966 as a promotional corporation. It was established to oversee Ali's future boxing promotions and pay-per-view closed-circuit television events.

=== Formation ===
The idea for the company arose during promotion of the November 1965 Ernie Terrell–George Chuvalo fight, when professional football player Jim Brown was approached to do color commentary. Television producer Mike Malitz (son of Lester Malitz) and his attorney Bob Arum suggested forming a company to give Ali more financial control. Bob Arum was introduced to Muhammad Ali by Jim Brown. Brown brought Arum's proposal to Ali, who received approval from the Nation of Islam's leader, Elijah Muhammad, leading to the eventual founding of Main Bout, Inc.

Ali had declined to renew his 1959 deal with the Louisville Sponsoring Group (LSG), 11 wealthy Kentucky businessmen who sponsored him. LSG received 40% of Ali's total earnings while covering only training costs. His contractual agreement was up for renewal on October 26, 1966. Ali's move reflected his association with the NOI, Jim Brown's union initiative, and growing scrutiny of how white owners exploited Black athletes. In early talks, Arum proposed boosting Ali's share of his gross earnings from 40% to 60% and engaging more Black entrepreneurs to manage closed-circuit outlets for his fights.

Presided over by Jabir Herbert Muhammad—son of Elijah Muhammad—the promotional group included Jim Brown, John Ali, Mike Malitz, and Bob Arum. With three Black and two white stockholders, Main Bout, Inc. was half-owned by Nation of Islam members and aligned with its economic nationalism philosophy. Herbert Muhammad held 25% of the company's stock. John Ali (national secretary of the Nation of Islam) was the company's treasurer and a 25% stockholder. Jim Brown, recently retired Cleveland Browns star and head of the Negro Industrial and Economic Union (NIEU), controlled 10% of the company. Jim Brown was Main Bout's vice president in charge of public relations. Brown believed famous Black athletes should focus on building economic power to help achieve equality, rather than joining the civil rights movement. Michael Malitz, who took over his father's closed-circuit television company, Lester M. Malitz, Inc., had a piece of the sports promotion. Together, Malitz and his attorney Bob Arum held 40% of the stock—Malitz with 30% and Arum with 10%.

=== Ali-Terrell ===
At a January press conference, Ali revealed the new corporation and named Ernie Terrell as his next title challenger set for March 1966.

Ali became draft-eligible six weeks before the fight and drew criticism for opposing the Vietnam War draft. Ali's opposition to the draft, coupled with Main Bout's NOI links and control over promotional rights, jeopardized his career. Attempts to block the Ali–Terrell fight caused difficulties in finding a venue in Chicago for the original date. During a news conference organized by Adam Clayton Powell Jr., Jim Brown reported that Main Bout exhibitors were being targeted by veterans' groups and other parties.

Following strong criticism in the U.S., Chicago rejected the fighters. Multiple American cities declined to host, leading to the bout's relocation to Maple Leaf Gardens in Toronto. After Ernie Terrell withdrew over contract concerns, Canadian heavyweight George Chuvalo filled in.

=== Ali-Chuvalo ===
In spring 1966, Main Bout Inc. held the ancillary rights to Muhammad Ali vs. George Chuvalo.

As its first major endeavor, Main Bout promoted the theater-TV presentation of the Chuvalo fight. Through Main Bout, Jim Brown partnered with Cookie Gilchrist, granting him rights to televise the fight in Buffalo. Brown gave 15 fellow African American football players the chance to earn through the Main Bout closed-circuit setup as theater exhibitors, including Gilchrist, Ernie Green, and Johnny Brown.

Despite early interest, only 20% of the 200 American theaters committed to the closed-circuit broadcast. Arum commented that Ali, "in the U.S. is a dead piece of merchandise. He's through as far as big-money closed-circuit is concerned. If we can, we'll try to put [Ali's next fight] on home TV.... If not, we'll forget about it. The money we made on this one certainly wasn't worth the effort."

=== Europe Closed-Circuit Market ===
Following Ali-Chuvalo, Ali's managers scheduled his next three title defenses in Europe, including Henry Cooper, Karl Mildenberger, and Brian London. Main Bout, Inc. granted ABC-TV the rights to televise all three bouts live on Wide World of Sports. The fight between Ali and Mildenberger was the first color sports telecast transmitted by satellite. After defeating Brian London by third-round knockout in August 1966, Ali announced Herbert Muhammad as his new boxing manager. Herbert told Jet Magazine his appointment depended on the succession plan at Main Bout, Inc., as rules barred managers from promoting their own fighters.

=== Ali-Williams ===
On November 4, 1966, Main Bout, Inc. handled Muhammad Ali vs. Cleveland Williams, with Ali earning 50%, Williams 14%, Main Bout, Inc. 24%, and 12% going to the Houston Sports Association. A record-setting crowd of over 35,000 filled the Astrodome for the fight.

=== Ali-Terrell ===
The canceled bout with Ernie Terrell was rescheduled 12 weeks after the Williams fight, with Ali returning to the Astrodome. The February 1967 Ali-Terrell bout reached 180 U.S. locations through closed-circuit TV, outpacing the Williams fight by 60. According to John Ali, it aired live in 110 countries, including both Europe and Asia—the first such event—while Africa and the Middle East received delayed coverage.

=== Ali-Chamberlain ===
Ali and Main Bout, Inc. explored a potential match with Wilt Chamberlain in March 1967, but Herbert Muhammad, Ali's manager and key decision-maker, blocked the idea. Jim Brown, then vice president, had planned to leave Main Bout to manage Chamberlain.

By April 1967, Main Bout, Inc., the closed-circuit television firm, handled five of heavyweight champion Muhammad Ali's title bouts.

=== End of Main Bout, Inc. ===
Over his April 28 refusal to join the United States Army during the Vietnam War, Ali faced the possibility of jail time and having his titles stripped. The refusal endangered the promotional firm's future earnings, with millions at stake if he went to prison. After promoting multiple Muhammad Ali fights, Main Bout Inc. faltered following his conviction for refusing military induction and the loss of his boxing licenses on June 20, 1967.

Recognizing Main Bout's collapse, Arum, Malitz, and Brown established Sports Action, Inc. in 1967. Ali's title had been stripped by the World Boxing Association and the New York Athletic Commission, the newly formed firm aimed to televise a tournament to determine his successor.

Bob Arum's early ties to Main Bout, Inc. led to his 1973 partnership with Herbert Muhammad in founding Top Rank.
