= Adailton de Jesus =

Brazilian boxer

Adailton De Jesus
Personal information
- Nickname: Precipicio
- Born: Adailton De Jesus Conçeiçâo; 8 September 1977 (age 49) Salvador, Bahia, Brazil
- Height: 1.72 m (5 ft 8 in)
- Weight: Super featherweight

Boxing career
- Stance: Orthodox

Boxing record
- Total fights: 40
- Wins: 31
- Win by KO: 25
- Losses: 8

Adailton de Jesus (born August 9, 1978) is a Brazilian boxer in the Featherweight division. He was born in Salvador, Bahia.

== Professional career ==
Known as "Precipício", Adailton turned pro in 2002 in his hometown. Adailton's trainer is Servílio de Oliveira, who won a bronze medal at the 1968 Summer Olympics in Mexico City.

After four years fighting in Brazil he made his USA debut against Kevin Carmody, he won a majority decision. Since that fight Adailton has built a career in the USA.

In October 30, 2007, he fought Yuriorkis Gamboa and lost by technical knockout. In his last fight, he lost a controversial Unanimous Decision against Mexican-American Marcos Ramirez for the Vacant IBF Latino Featherweight Title. The fight was held in Kansas City, the hometown of Marcos Ramirez.ESPN announcer Teddy Atlas scored Adailton De Jesus as a two-point winner. Upon hearing the scoring of the judges, Atlas remarked that "... De Jesus should have never even gotten on the plane."

| Preceded by Ricardo Silva; Vacated | CBBP Featherweight Champion; 20 Aug 2004– 20 Aug 2004 | Succeeded by Juciel Lima Nascimento |
