= Steven Luevano =

American boxer (born 1981)

Personal information
- Born: March 3, 1981 (age 45) Los Angeles, California, U.S.
- Height: 5 ft 7 in (170 cm)
- Weight: Super bantamweight; Featherweight

Boxing career
- Reach: 69 in (175 cm)
- Stance: Southpaw

Boxing record
- Total fights: 40
- Wins: 37
- Win by KO: 15
- Losses: 2
- Draws: 1

Steven "Steve" Luevano (born March 3, 1981) is an American former professional boxer who held the WBO featherweight title. He was trained by the former IBF Super Featherweight Champion Robert Garcia.

== Amateur career ==
Steven fought on the Mexican National amateur team. He is the 1997 National Jr. Olympic amateur champion at 119 pounds and had almost 300 amateur bouts before entering the pro ranks.

== Pro career ==
Luevano turned pro in 2000 and defeated many talented veterans including a win over future IBF Featherweight Champion Cristobal Cruz.

=== WBO Featherweight Championship ===
On July 14, 2007, Luevano won the Vacant WBO Featherweight Championship by upsetting an undefeated and the future Super Featherweight WBO champion Nicky Cook by K.O.

On October 6, 2007, Steven Luevano (34-1, 15 KOs) defended his WBO Featherweight title, unanimously defeating 35-year-old Antonio "T-Rex" Davis (24-4) on the undercard of Manny Pacquiao and Marco Antonio Barrera. On March 15 Luevano defended his title magnificently against Thailands Terdsak Jandaeng (29-2-0) winning unanimously. In this pay-per-view fight he landed a featherweight boxing record for most jabs landed.

Even though Steven was born in the United States, he came to the ring with the Mexican flag instead, thus leading the boxing world to believe the fact that Luevano was a Mexican boxer.

Steven Luevano was tested in his 3rd defense against Mario Santiago on the David Diaz-Manny Pacquiao undercard at Mandalay Bay Events Center on June 28, 2008. Luevano retained his 126-pound belt via split draw against Santiago. Judge Harry Davis scored it 117-111 for Luevano, Duane Ford had it 115-113 for Santiago and Dave Moretti had it 114-114. ESPN.com also had it 114-114. Luevano landed 215 of 641 punches (34%) while Santiago connected on 214 of 835 (26%).

On October 18, 2008, Luevano defeated Billy Dib of Australia (21-0-0) for his 4th defense by unanimous decision.

On August 15, 2009, Luevano successfully defended his title for a 5th time via disqualification against Bernabe Concepcion (29-1-2). Luevano was ahead on the scorecards when Concepcion landed late blows after the bell at the end of the seventh round, resulting in Concepcion being disqualified.

Luevano ultimately lost his title on January 23, 2010, as he was stopped in the 7th round by former WBO junior bantamweight champion Juan Manuel Lopez. This was his only knockout loss.

== Professional boxing record ==
40 fights	37 wins	2 losses
By knockout	15	1
By decision	21	1
By disqualification	1	0
Draws	1	

No.	Result	Record	Opponent	Type	Round, time	Date	Location	Notes
40	Loss	37–2–1	Juan Manuel López	TKO	7 (12)	2010-01-23	Madison Square Garden, New York City, New York, U.S.	Lost WBO featherweight title
39	Win	37–1–1	Bernabe Concepcion	DQ	7 (12)	2009-08-15	The Joint, Paradise, Nevada, U.S.	Retained WBO featherweight title
38	Win	36–1–1	Billy Dib	UD	12 (12)	2008-10-18	Boardwalk Hall, Atlantic City, New Jersey, U.S.	Retained WBO featherweight title
37	Draw	35–1–1	Mario Santiago	SD	12 (12)	2008-06-28	Mandalay Bay Resort & Casino, Paradise, Nevada, U.S.	Retained WBO featherweight title
36	Win	35–1	Terdsak Jandaeng	UD	12 (12)	2008-03-15	Mandalay Bay Resort & Casino, Paradise, Nevada, U.S.	Retained WBO featherweight title
35	Win	34–1	Antonio Davis	UD	12 (12)	2007-10-06	Mandalay Bay Resort & Casino, Paradise, Nevada, U.S.	Retained WBO featherweight title
34	Win	33–1	Nicky Cook	KO	11 (12)	2007-07-14	The O2 Arena, London, England, U.K.	Won vacant WBO featherweight title
33	Win	32–1	Baudel Cardenas	UD	12 (12)	2006-10-13	Palo Duro Golf Club, Nogales, Arizona, U.S.	Retained NABO featherweight title
32	Win	31–1	Cristóbal Cruz	UD	12 (12)	2006-07-21	Mohegan Sun Arena, Uncasville, Connecticut, U.S.	Won vacant NABO featherweight title
31	Win	30–1	Jorge Martinez	UD	10 (10)	2006-03-31	Edgewater Hotel and Casino, Laughlin, Nevada, U.S.	
30	Loss	29–1	Martin Honorio	UD	10 (10)	2005-11-25	Santa Ana Star Casino Hotel, Bernalillo, New Mexico, U.S.	
29	Win	29–0	Ruben Estanislao	UD	12 (12)	2005-09-09	Edgewater Hotel and Casino, Laughlin, Nevada, U.S.	Won vacant NABO super-bantamweight title
28	Win	28–0	Genaro Trazancos	TKO	5 (12)	2005-06-17	Dodge Theater, Phoenix, Arizona, U.S.	
27	Win	27–0	Julian Rodriguez	TKO	5 (10)	2005-03-05	Mandalay Bay Resort & Casino, Paradise, Nevada, U.S.	
26	Win	26–0	Aldo Valtierra	UD	10 (10)	2004-11-05	Hawthorne Race Course, Stickney, Illinois, U.S.	
25	Win	25–0	Cristian Favela	UD	10 (10)	2004-10-08	Edgewater Hotel and Casino, Laughlin, Nevada, U.S.	
24	Win	24–0	Fred Neal	RTD	9 (10)	2004-07-02	Field House, Struthers, Ohio, U.S.	
23	Win	23–0	Rodrigo Cerda	KO	1 (8)	2004-05-21	Memorial Coliseum, Corpus Christi, Texas, U.S.	
22	Win	22–0	Armando Cordoba	UD	8 (8)	2004-02-13	Edgewater Hotel and Casino, Laughlin, Nevada, U.S.	
21	Win	21–0	Jose Luis Tula	TKO	2 (8)	2003-12-05	Dodge Theater, Phoenix, Arizona, U.S.	
20	Win	20–0	Miguel Angel Escamilla	UD	6 (6)	2003-08-15	Stodick Park, Gardnerville, Nevada, U.S.	
19	Win	19–0	Aristeo Perez	TKO	2 (6)	2003-06-14	Arrowhead Pond, Anaheim, California, U.S.	
18	Win	18–0	John Nolasco	UD	8 (8)	2003-05-02	Plaza Hotel & Casino, Las Vegas, Nevada, U.S.	
17	Win	17–0	Phillip Payne	UD	6 (6)	2003-03-28	Performing Arts Center, Oxnard, California, U.S.	
16	Win	16–0	Marcos Badillo	KO	1 (6)	2003-02-22	Arrowhead Pond, Anaheim, California, U.S.	
15	Win	15–0	Aristeo Perez	UD	6 (6)	2002-11-01	The Orleans, Paradise, Nevada, U.S.	
14	Win	14–0	Ivan Alvarez	TKO	1 (8)	2002-10-04	Plaza Hotel & Casino, Las Vegas, Nevada, U.S.	
13	Win	13–0	Juan Carlos Garcia	UD	6 (6)	2002-08-09	The Orleans, Paradise, Nevada, U.S.	
12	Win	12–0	Justo Sanchez	RTD	4 (6)	2002-06-21	The Orleans, Paradise, Nevada, U.S.	
11	Win	11–0	Freddy Castro	TD	4 (6)	2001-07-15	Soboba Casino, San Jacinto, California, U.S.	
10	Win	10–0	Juan Carlos Martinez	UD	6 (6)	2001-06-03	Soboba Casino, San Jacinto, California, U.S.	
9	Win	9–0	Martin Llamas	UD	4 (4)	2001-04-08	River Palms Casino, Laughlin, Nevada, U.S.	
8	Win	8–0	Francisco Rodriguez	UD	4 (4)	2001-03-04	Peppermill Hotel & Casino, Reno, Nevada, U.S.	
7	Win	7–0	Jacob Godinez	UD	4 (4)	2001-02-04	Lucky Star Casino, Concho, Oklahoma, U.S.	
6	Win	6–0	Miguel Medina	TKO	1 (4)	2000-11-26	Midnight Rodeo, Phoenix, Arizona, U.S.	
5	Win	5–0	Luis Enrique Valenzuela	KO	2 (4)	2000-11-05	Pepsi Arena, Chula Vista, California, U.S.	
4	Win	4–0	Martin Llamas	SD	4 (4)	2000-09-17	El Gran Mercado, Phoenix, Arizona, U.S.	
3	Win	3–0	Ignacio Gonzalez	TKO	3 (4)	2000-09-03	Casino West, Yerington, Nevada, U.S.	
2	Win	2–0	Joseph Salazar	TKO	3 (4)	2000-08-20	Community Center, Tucson, Arizona, U.S.	
1	Win	1–0	Hugo Elacio Rosales	KO	2 (4)	2000-06-17	Bicycle Club, Bell Gardens, California, U.S.	

== Retirement ==
While only 29 years old and still in his prime, Steven decided to retire from boxing, following his loss to Juan Manuel Lopez. During his professional career, Steven Luevano won the WBO NABO Super Bantamweight, WBC Continental Americas Featherweight, WBO NABO Featherweight, and made six defences of his WBO Featherweight Championship.

== See also ==
- List of southpaw stance boxers
- List of Mexican boxing world champions
- List of world featherweight boxing champions

Sporting positions
Regional boxing titles
Vacant Title last held by Daniel Ponce de León	NABO super-bantamweight champion September 9, 2005 – 2005; Vacated	Vacant Title next held by Juan Ruiz
Vacant Title last held by Marcos Ramirez	NABO featherweight champion July 21, 2006 – 2006; Vacated	Vacant Title next held by Marcos Ramirez
World boxing titles
Vacant Title last held by Juan Manuel Márquez	WBO featherweight champion July 14, 2007 – January 23, 2010	Succeeded by Juan Manuel López
