= Olivier Lontchi =

Cameroonian boxer

Personal information
- Nationality: Canada, Cameroon
- Born: Olivier Lontchi; 8 June 1983 (age 43) Cameroon
- Weight: super bantamweight

Boxing career
- Stance: orthodox

Boxing record
- Total fights: 23
- Wins: 18
- Win by KO: 8
- Losses: 3
- Draws: 2
- No contests: 0

Olivier Lontchi, (born June 8, 1983, in Cameroon) is a Cameroon-born Canada based professional boxer who fights in the super bantamweight division. Lontchi is the current NABA super bantamweight champion and like fellow Cameroon born fighter Herman Ngoudjo he is trained by Howard Grant and based in Montreal.

== Amateur career ==
Lontchi represented the Cameroon as an amateur boxer. He won a bronze medal in the featherweight division at the 2001 Francophone Games in Ottawa. Following this he and Ngoudjo, who also won a bronze, remained in Canada and they continue to be based there.

== Professional career ==
=== Debut ===
Lontchi turned professional in September 2004 at Club Soda, Montreal, Quebec, Canada on an undercard of bill that included stablemate Walid Smichet. In his debut Lontchi drew with Limoilou's Dave Drouin, six month later the pair would fight again and that time Lontchi won with a fourth round knockout.

=== Canadian featherweight title ===
Lontchi remained unbeaten and in 2006 he fought Jason Adams for his Canadian featherweight title in Adams' home province of Alberta. Lontchi knocked out Adams in the ninth of a scheduled ten rounds with an overhand right that left Adams on the canvas for several minutes. Adams had never been stopped in any of his previous fights and following this Lontchi was awarded the prize for Knockout of the Year at the 2006 Canadian Fightnews awards.

=== NABA and WBO NABO super bantamweight titles ===
Six straight victories later Lontchi dropped down a weight to the super bantamweight division to face former Mexican and WBO bantamweight champion Cruz Carbajal for both the NABA and WBO NABO belts. Carbajal was the vastly more experience fighter having challenged for the a variety of world title and this being Lontchi's first fight at super bantam and for an international title. Despite this Lontchi produced a master class with his speed overcoming Carbajal power and he went on to win a clear points victory over twelve rounds with only one judge giving Carbajal a single round.

== Professional record ==
18 Wins (8 knockouts), 3 Losses, 2 Draw
| Result | Record | Opponent | Type | Round, time | Date | Location | Notes |
| Loss | 18–3–2 | (Canada) Tyler Asselstine | UD | 8 | 04/09/2013 | (United States) Fairmont Royal York, Toronto, Ontario, Canada | |
| Loss | 18–2–2 | (United States) Mikey Garcia | KO | 5 (10) | 12/04/2010 | (United States) Honda Center, Anaheim, California, U.S. | |
| Loss | 18–1–2 | (Puerto Rico) Juan Manuel López | RTD | 9 (12) | 06/27/2009 | (United States) Boardwalk Hall, Atlantic City, New Jersey, U.S. | For WBO super bantamweight title |
| Win | 18–0–2 | (Mexico) Cecilio Santos | KO | 7 (12) | 04/04/2009 | Montreal Casino, Montreal, Quebec, Canada | |
| Win | 17–0–2 | (Mexico) Ruben Estanislao | KO | 2 (10) | 11/01/2008 | Montreal Casino, Montreal, Quebec, Canada | |
| Draw | 16–0–2 | (Mexico) Eduardo Garcia | PTS | 10 | 08/29/2008 | Casino Rama, Rama, Ontario, Canada | Retained NABA super bantamweight title |
| Win | 16–0–1 | (Mexico) Roberto Lopez | UD | 12 | 03/08/2008 | Montreal Casino, Montreal, Quebec, Canada | Retained NABA super bantamweight title |
| Win | 15–0–1 | (Mexico) Henry Arjona | UD | 8 | 02/09/2008 | Montreal Casino, Montreal, Quebec, Canada | |
| Win | 14–0–1 | (Mexico) Cruz Carbajal | UD | 12 | 11/10/2007 | Montreal Casino, Montreal, Quebec, Canada | Won vacant NABA super bantamweight and vacant WBO NABO super bantamweight titles |
| Win | 13–0–1 | (Mexico) Fermin de los Santos | UD | 8 | 08/03/2007 | Centre Pierre Charbonneau, Montreal, Quebec, Canada | |
| Win | 12–0–1 | (Mexico) Osvaldo Lara | KO | 2 (8) | 04/14/2007 | Montreal Casino, Montreal, Quebec, Canada | |
| Win | 11–0–1 | (Mexico) Roman Campos | TKO | 5 (8) | 03/10/2007 | Montreal Casino, Montreal, Quebec, Canada | |
| Win | 10–0–1 | (Canada) Mike Pare | TKO | 10 | 11/18/2006 | Colisée de Trois-Rivières, Trois-Rivières, Quebec, Canada | Won Canada featherweight title |
| Win | 9–0–1 | (Mexico) Giovanni Caro | UD | 6 | 09/30/2006 | Montreal Casino, Montreal, Quebec, Canada | |
| Win | 8–0–1 | (Mexico) Saul Gutierrez Hernandez | UD | 4 | 05/24/2006 | Métropolis, Montreal, Quebec, Canada | |
| Win | 7–0–1 | (Canada) Jason Adams | KO | 9 (10) | 04/13/2006 | Capri Centre, Red Deer, Alberta, Canada | Won Canada featherweight title |
| Win | 6–0–1 | (Chile) Hardy Paredes | UD | 8 | 02/25/2006 | Casino du Lac-Leamy, Gatineau, Quebec, Canada | |
| Win | 5–0–1 | (Canada) Mathias Tchikaya | UD | 4 | 10/12/2005 | Árena de Grand-Mère, Grand-Mère, Quebec, Canada | |
| Win | 4–0–1 | (United States) Bobby Conners | TKO | 3 (4) | 10/01/2005 | Delta Hotel, Trois-Rivières, Quebec, Canada | |
| Win | 3–0–1 | (Guyana) Stephen Rose | UD | 6 | 07/13/2005 | Métropolis, Montreal, Quebec, Canada | |
| Win | 2–0–1 | (Canada) Dave Drouin | TKO | 4 (6) | 04/16/2005 | Le Colibri, Victoriaville, Quebec, Canada | |
| Win | 1–0–1 | (United States) Alex Cruz | UD | 4 | 12/01/2004 | Club Soda, Montreal, Quebec, Canada | |
| Draw | 0–0–1 | (Canada) Dave Drouin | PTS | 4 | 09/29/2004 | Club Soda, Montreal, Quebec, Canada | |
