= Manny Pacquiao vs. Jorge Solís =

Boxing match

Blaze of Glory
- Date: April 14, 2007
- Venue: Alamodome, San Antonio, Texas, U.S.
- Title(s) on the line: WBC International super featherweight title

Tale of the tape
Boxer	Manny Pacquiao	Jorge Solís
Nickname	"Pac-Man"	Coloradito ("Red Mole")
Hometown	General Santos, Soccsksargen, Philippines	Guadalajara, Jalisco, Mexico
Purse	$2,000,000	
Pre-fight record	43–3–2 (34 KO)	33–0–2 (25 KO)
Age	28 years, 3 months	27 years, 5 months
Height	5 ft 6 1/2 in (169 cm)	5 ft 10 in (178 cm)
Weight	128 3/4 lb (58 kg)	130 lb (59 kg)
Style	Southpaw	Orthodox
Recognition	WBA/WBC/WBO/The Ring; No. 1 Ranked Super Featherweight; IBF; No. 3 Ranked Super Featherweight; WBC International super featherweight champion The Ring No. 2 ranked pound-for-pound fighter 3-division world champion	WBC; No. 2 Ranked Featherweight; WBO; No. 4 Ranked Featherweight; WBA; No. 10 Ranked Featherweight; The Ring; No. 8 Ranked Featherweight

Result
- Pacquiao wins via 8th-round KO

Manny Pacquiao vs. Jorge Solís, billed as Blaze of Glory, was a professional boxing match contested on April 14, 2007, for the WBC International super featherweight championship.

== Background ==
The bout took place at the Alamodome, San Antonio, Texas, United States and was distributed by Top Rank PPV.

== The fight ==
Pacquiao had a slow start during the first few rounds as he was trying to adjust with Solis' height and reach advantage. He eventually controlled the pace of the fight and landed some flurries punches later on. In the sixth round, Pacquiao suffered a cut over his left eye due to an accidental clash of heads. Solis, on the other hand, had his nose bleeding through the seventh round. The fight ended in the eighth round via KO after Solis' second knockdown of the round.

== Aftermath ==
A month after the fight, Pacquiao lost his congressional seat bid for the 1st district of South Cotabato in the 2007 Philippine general elections against the incumbent congresswoman Darlene Antonino-Custodio.

== Undercard ==
Confirmed bouts:

== Broadcasting ==
Country	Broadcaster
Australia	Main Event
Canada	Viewers Choice
Mexico	TV Azteca
Philippines	Solar Sports / GMA
United Kingdom	Sky Sports (Live) / BBC (Delayed)
United States	Top Rank PPV (Main Card) / ESPN360.com (Undercard)

Preceded by vs. Érik Morales III	Manny Pacquiao's bouts 14 April 2007	Succeeded by vs. Marco Antonio Barrera II
Preceded by vs. Fernando Omar Lizarraga	Jorge Solís's bouts 14 April 2007	Succeeded by vs. Santiago Allione
