= Darling Jimenez =

Dominican Republic boxer

Personal information
- Nationality: Dominican Republic
- Born: March 4, 1980 (age 46) Yonkers, New York, United States
- Height: 5 ft 6 in (1.68 m)
- Weight: Lightweight

Boxing career
- Reach: 69"
- Stance: orthodox

Boxing record
- Total fights: 28
- Wins: 23
- Win by KO: 14
- Losses: 3
- Draws: 2

Darling Jiménez (Yonkers, born March 4, 1980) is an American professional boxer of Dominican descent.

== Biography ==
Jimenez began boxing at the age of 12. He now resides in the Washington Heights section of New York.

== Amateur career ==
Darling Jimenez compiled an exceptional amateur record of 107–3. He is a four-time New York Golden Gloves Champion (1997–2000) who earned the Sugar Ray Robinson Award for Outstanding Boxer at the Golden Gloves three times (1997–1999). He beat Paul Malignaggi twice in his victories at the New York Golden Gloves Championships. He reached the semi-finals of the 2000 Olympic Trials where he was defeated by David Jackson, the eventual 132 lb. representative for the U.S. Olympic Team.

== Professional career ==
In his pro debut on September 15, 2000, Jimenez challenged Artur Petrosyan in Petroysan's Las Vegas, Nevada backyard. Petroysan entered the bout with a record of 5–0. Nevertheless, Jimenez battled Petrosyan from the opening bell, earning a four-round draw (D 4).

Since his pro debut Jimenez has rattled off nine consecutive victories, four by knockout.

On February 2, 2002, Jimenez stunned ringside observers with his three-round demolition of fellow undefeated jr. lightweight Jadschi Green (TKO 3). Green, who entered the bout with a record of 4–0–2, 4 KO's, attempted to utilize his five-inch reach advantage to box and frustrate Jimenez. Jimenez patiently dismantled Green with punishing left hooks to the body and stinging lead rights, flooring Green once in round two and twice in round three. The referee halted the bout at the :47 mark of round three, immediately following the second knockdown of the round.

On March 15, 2002, Jimenez dominated Ronnie Longakit to pitch a six-round shutout by the scores of 60-54 (three times). Jimenez bloodied Longakit's nose and swelled both his eyes with stinging overhand rights to dominate the bout from the opening bell.

On April 12, 2002, Jimenez battled to an eight-round draw against Peter Nieves (D 8).

On August 2, 2002, Jimenez stopped Marty Robbins in the first round with a crippling left hook to the body (TKO 1).

Just weeks later on August 30, 2002, Jimenez won a technical decision over Nelson Medina after suffering a cut from an accidental head butt in round two (TD 4). Jimenez was ahead on all three judges’ scorecards at the time of the stoppage by a margin of 40–35.

On November 22, 2002, Jimenez blasted Corey Ben Alarcon, flooring him twice to earn a second round stoppage (TKO 2). Following the second knockdown at the 2:11 mark of round two, Alarcon's corner men threw in the towel.

On May 17, 2008, at Buffalo Bill's Star Arena in Primm, Nevada, Jimenez fought Yuriorkis Gamboa. Gamboa started off well in the first three rounds of the fight, swarming Jimenez and hitting him with punches over and over. Gamboa looked flustered in the fourth round and began showing signs of fatigue. In the fourth round, Jimenez caught Gamboa with a right hand behind the ear and knocked Gamboa down. Gamboa won a unanimous decision. Two judges had the fight 92–97, and one had it 99–91.
