= Wilson Alcorro =

Colombian boxer (born 1973)

Personal information
- Nickname: El Chapa
- Nationality: Colombian
- Born: March 11, 1974 (age 52) Monteria, Colombia
- Height: 5 ft 9 in (1.75 m)
- Weight: Light Welterweight; Lightweight; Super Featherweight; Featherweight

Boxing career
- Reach: 72 in (183 cm)
- Stance: Southpaw

Boxing record
- Total fights: 42
- Wins: 26
- Win by KO: 17
- Losses: 13
- Draws: 2
- No contests: 0

Wilson Alcorro (born 11 March 1974) is a Colombian former professional boxer who competed from 1994 to 2011. He held the IBF Latino title in 1996.

== Professional career ==
=== IBF Latino Championship ===
In May 1996, Wilson knocked out undefeated Jud Franky Granada to win the IBF Latino title.

=== Soto vs. Alcorro ===
On May 28, 2004 Alcorro lost by T.K.O. to WBC Featherweight champion Humberto Soto over twelve rounds.
