= Juan Manuel López (boxer) =

Puerto Rican boxer (born 1983)

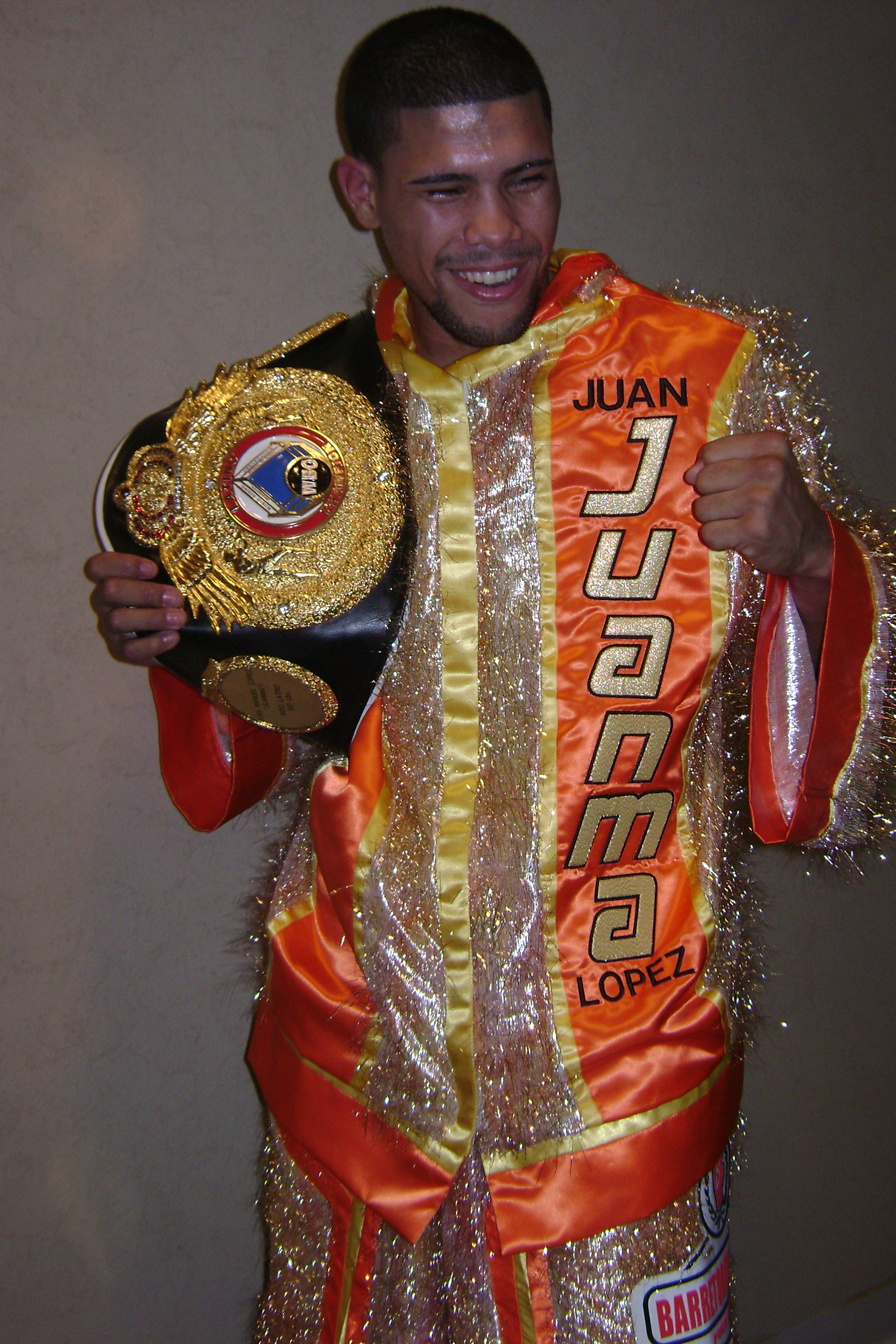
- López with the WBO Latino title, 2007

Personal information
- Nickname: Juanma
- Born: Juan Manuel López Rivera; June 30, 1983 (age 43) Río Piedras, Puerto Rico
- Height: 5 ft 5 1/2 in (166 cm)
- Weight: Super bantamweight; Featherweight; Super featherweight

Boxing career
- Reach: 69 in (175 cm)
- Stance: Southpaw

Boxing record
- Total fights: 44
- Wins: 36
- Win by KO: 32
- Losses: 6
- Draws: 2
Medal record
Men's amateur boxing
Representing Puerto Rico
Central American and Caribbean Games
| Bronze medal – third place | 2002 San Salvador | Bantamweight |

Juan Manuel López Rivera (born June 30, 1983), often known as Juanma Lopez, is a Puerto Rican former professional boxer who competed from 2005 to 2019. He is a world champion in two weight classes, having held the WBO junior featherweight title from 2008 to 2009, and the WBO featherweight title from 2010 to 2011. As an amateur he represented Puerto Rico at numerous international tournaments, including the 2002 Central American and Caribbean Games, the 2003 Pan American Games, and the 2004 Olympics. López was considered a knockout artist at his peak in the late 2000s and early 2010s.

== Amateur career ==
López started boxing when he was ten years old. He won the Puerto Rican national amateur championship for five consecutive years between 2000 and 2004. López represented Puerto Rico internationally, fighting in the bantamweight division (119 pounds (54 kg) in the amateur circuit). In the 2001 Pan American Championships held in San Juan, Puerto Rico, on August 10–18, López ended in the second place after Elio Rojas of the Dominican Republic. He was part of the national team assembled to compete in the 2002 Central American and Caribbean Games, held in San Salvador. In this competition, López debuted by defeating local pugilist Antonio Nuñez by points (23:16), but lost a decision to Abner Mares of Mexico, with scores of 23:19. In the first 2003 Pan American qualifier, López debuted by defeating Francisco Palma of Ecuador, with scores of 12:8. In the semifinals, he lost to Alexander Espinoza of Venezuela by points (11:10). His next major international event was the 2003 Pan American Games, organized in Santo Domingo. Debuting in the preliminaries, López defeated Castulo González of Guatemala by points (27:10) in the inaugural fight. In the quarterfinals, he was matched against Mares, losing another fight by points, on this occasion with results of 24:21. López was among the Puerto Rican boxers that competed in the American Olympic qualification tournament, which took place in Tijuana. He began his participation on March 14, 2004, by defeating Roberto Benítez of the United States via decision. In the tournament's second date, he defeated Algenis Méndez, who represented the Dominican Republic, by points. In the final, López lost a decision to Andrew Kooner of Canada, with scores of 29:18. This performance earned him a position in the national team that participated at the 2004 Summer Olympics, held in Athens. As part of his training for that games, López participated in two "Puerto Rico vs. USA" tournaments, where both national teams paired those qualified for the event. The first of these took place on May 7, 2004, in Reno, Nevada. There, López defeated Eric Hunter by walkover. In the second, organized in Trenton, New Jersey, on October 4, 2004, he defeated Torrence Daniels by points (16–15). This was followed by his last participation in the Jose "Cheo" Aponte Tournament in Caguas, Puerto Rico, where he defeated Luis Peña in the finals, 33–5. López's Olympic debut took place on August 17, 2004, when he was paired against Khavazhi Khatsigov of Belarus, losing the contest by points (27–19). Upon closing his amateur career, he had compiled a record of 126–24.

== Professional career ==
López turned professional in 2005 following the Olympic games, boxing in the junior featherweight division. As a professional he is promoted by Top Rank Boxing and comanaged by Orlando Piñero and Peter Rivera, president of Puerto Rico Best Boxing Promotions. López debuted on January 29, 2005, in Bayamón, Puerto Rico picking a quick knockout victory against also debuting boxer Luis Colón. He would go on to defeat nine straight adversaries by knockout: Ivan Cordero, Efrain Perez, Eric Nemos, Charlie Jones, Roberto Chacón, Luis Bolaño, Manuel Sanabria and Jose Luis Caro. He concluded his first year as a professional with a record of 8–0 with eight knockouts, which earned him the Puerto Rico Boxing Commission's recognition for rookie and prospect of the year. On March 4, 2006, he won his first fight by unanimous decision against Gilberto Bolanos of Mexico. He would win four more fights before the end of 2006, three of them by knockout. One of these fights was against Jose Alonso, for the WBO Latino Super Bantamweight Championship, a regional championship sanctioned by the World Boxing Organization. The fight took place on September 30, 2006, in Caguas and ended in the third round when López defeated Alonso by technical knockout. His first fight of 2007 took place in Dodge Arena in Phoenix, Arizona against Cuauhtemoc Vargas, in a fight he won when Vargas was unable to continue. He would compete again on March 3 in San Juan, against Leivi Brea, in a fight that he won by technical knockout. On April 28, 2007, López would have his first fight outside of Puerto Rico and the United States in a fight that took place in Barranquilla, Colombia. The fight was against Colombian boxer Jorge Otero, the fight ended when the referee stopped the fight thus giving López another technical knockout victory. López's next fight took place on June 22, 2007, in Hato Rey, Puerto Rico against Giovanni Andrade of Brazil as the main event of a card presented by Puerto Rico Best Boxing. López won the fight by technical knockout at 2:59 of the first round when Andrade indicated to the referee that he could not continue. On August 4, 2007, López retained his regional title in a fight where he defeated Hugo Dianzo by technical knockout. López dominated throughout the fight opening wounds on Dianzo's head. On the tenth round one of López's punches opened one of these wounds further which led to Dianzo losing a significant amount of blood, following this incident the referee stopped the fight. López would successfully defend his regional title against Omar Adorno, in a special fight card presented by the WBO that took place on October 31, 2007. Juan scored three knockdowns throughout the course of the fight, and after two minutes of the second round had passed he won the fight by knockout. López's fourth title defense took place on February 23, 2008, when he defeated Jonathan Oquendo by technical knockout in the third round of an event titled Guerra Civil.

=== WBO super bantamweight champion ===
On June 7, 2008, López fought in his first world championship match when he challenged Daniel Ponce de León for the World Boxing Organization's super bantamweight title in a card organized by Home Box Office at the Boardwalk Hall in Atlantic City, New Jersey. He won by technical knockout in the first round, when the referee stopped the fight after Ponce de León failed to respond following two consecutive knockdowns. After attending several homages, presentations and interviews, López received his championship belt from the WBO's president, Francisco "Paco" Valcárcel, on June 13, 2008. During this ceremony, he received a letter from Wilfredo Gómez, offering congratulations and predicting a solid career. López's first defense was against César Figueroa and it took place on October 4, 2008, in an event titled "The First Step" which was organized at the José Miguel Agrelot Coliseum in Puerto Rico. The opponent in this contest was originally expected to be Olivier Lontchi, but he was discarded after earning a draw against what was perceived as a "low quality" adversary. His entrance featured fireworks and personalized music composed by Baby Rasta & Gringo, while Félix Trinidad and Iván Calderón accompanied him in the ring. The fight lasted only 47 seconds, López began by boxing around the ring and throwing sporadic jabs, but in his first offensive attempt he connected a combination that left Figueroa unconscious. Roberto Ramírez, the fight's referee, concluded the protection count without response and stopped the contest by knockout. This marked the fifth fastest knockout victory in a title fight, superating Mike Tyson's win over Michael Spinks. Two days after this fight, Bob Arum confirmed that López would be featured as part of "The Dream Match" card, which presented a fight between Manny Pacquiao and Oscar De La Hoya in the main event. López began training again on October 13, 2008, seeking to conserve and improve his physical condition for this event. During this week, Israel Vázquez responded to a challenge issued following the defense against Figueroa, stating that a matchup between both pugilists would be "interesting" because it would "be a challenge". López concurred, noting that after a preparatory fight in 2009, the plan would be to organize the fight in New York, the night before the Puerto Rican Day Parade. Approaches were made to several of the ranked pugilists, with Sergio Medina and Bernabé Concepción emerging as tentative opponents. The WBO's bantamweight champion, Gerry Peñalosa, expressed interest in pursuing the fight after Abner Mares was injured, but his proposal included a guarantee of $250,000 in earnings, which wasn't considered as cost effective by López and his staff. In the meanwhile, he received a homage as part of the Dominican Parade in San Juan, serving as Padrino Internacional (lit. "International Godfather") along Calderón.

Medina, who at the moment was ranked fourth by the WBO, was ultimately selected as the adversary for the event organized on December 6, 2008. During the activities organized prior to this card, López met Vázquez and Rafael Márquez in person, with both of them expressing interest in competing against him during 2009. The fight lasted 1:38, being stopped by the referee in the first round, when López scored three consecutive knockdowns. According to Compubox, Medina was only able to land one punch in six attempts, while exhibiting a timid pace. López took offensive initiative and continued in control of the fight's tempo throughout the contest. In recognition to his performance during 2008, López received numerous recognitions including "Athlete of the Year" awards from Primera Hora and the Museo del Deporte de Puerto Rico, in addition he was included in a list titled Los pioneros del año published by El Nuevo Día, which discussed the year's most notorious public figures. On February 10, 2009, Golden Boy Promotions' vice president, Eric Gómez, confirmed that López's first mandatory defense would be against Peñalosa.

The event was held on April 25, 2009, being dubbed "Campeón vs.Campeón", emphasizing that both boxers were champions entering the contest. Early in the fight, both pugilists exchanged combinations, with López gaining a slight advantage by targeting the head and body of Peñalosa. This pattern continued in the third and fourth rounds, while the challenger continued counterattacking despite receiving more damage. Between the fifth and sixth chapters, both pugilists exchanged combinations, with Peñalosa scoring his most solid punches. During the following two rounds, López managed to establish control of the offensive's tempo, but Peñalosa continued using his counterattack. Prior to the ninth chapter, Peñalosa's trainer, Freddie Roach, warned him that he had to win by knockout or the fight would be stopped. In the round, the pattern continued with few variations, once it was over Roach submitted the fight. With this technical knockout, López became the first boxer to defeat the veteran by knockout. After the fight, Peñalosa received an ovation from the public for his effort. Throughout the fight, López established divisional records, breaking the marks for most power punches landed in a round and most power punches thrown in a round, both were achieved during the eight round.

Subsequently, López defended against Oliver Lontchi. The pugilist began the fight calmly. In the second round, López scored a knockdown. Consequently, Lontchi switched to a defensive tactic during the following round, before beginning to exchange combinations. López was scoring the stronger punches during these exchanges, winning the sixth and seventh chapters. In the ninth, Lontchi received a second knockdown and his corner decided to stop the fight during the recess. In his last fight at the super bantamweight division, López defended against Rogers Mtagwa. The first stage of the fight featured a head clash that injured López's left eye. In the fifth round, the pugilist scored a knockdown, but Mtagwa recovered and continued. In the eight round, López engaged on the offensive, gaining advantage. Mtagwa scored punches after the bell in the eight and ninth rounds. Despite holding a lead on the scorecards, López decided to continue trading in the latter half of the fight. In the final minute of the eleventh round, Mtagwa injured him with a punch, but was not able to score a knockdown. López, still injured, employed a defensive stance throughout the twelfth round, surviving to receive a unanimous decision with scores of 116–111, 115-111 and 114–113.

=== Featherweight division ===
Immediately following this fight, plans to fight Steven Luevano for the WBO featherweight championship were made public. An economic agreement was reached in November 2009. The event was organized in January 2010, at Madison Square Garden. Both boxed around the ring during the first round, with López gaining a slight advantage. Luevano used his speed to employ a constant jab during the second round, working on counter-punches, which left him open to a combination to end that stage. López began pursuing the offensive during the third round, employing combinations and pursuing Luevano, who attempted to counter. This pattern persisted during the following two rounds. By the sixth round López's offensive had damaged Luevano's left eye, which began to swell. In the seventh round López scored a knockdown following a combination. Luevano was able to stand up but was still injured, which prompted the referee to stop the fight by technical knockout.

López's first featherweight defense took place on July 10, 2010, against the WBO's mandatory challenger, Bernabé Concepción. The first round began with both boxers circling around the ring, studying their respective opponent. During an exchange Concepción received a left hook that forced him to fall back against the ropes, López then engaged on the offensive, scoring a knockdown. This pattern continued, with Concepción staying on the offensive until he was able to counter and score a knockdown. López began the second round more aggressive, scoring two consecutive knockdowns, which prompted the referee to stop the fight by technical knockout.

With this outcome, previous negotiations with Rafael Márquez's camp continued, pursuing an autumn date for the contest. September 18, 2010, was the original scheduled date, but an injury suffered by Márquez during training forced postponement. The event was rescheduled for November 6, 2010. López won the fight by a TKO in the 9th round, when Márquez refused to come back to fight due to an injured shoulder.

On April 16, 2011, he lost the WBO title to Orlando Salido via technical knockout, as the referee stopped the fight in the 8th round. The bout was held in Bayamon, Puerto Rico. The outcome of the fight was a huge upset. It was the first loss of López' career. On March 10, 2012, he lost again to Orlando Salido in a rematch by 10th-round technical knockout in San Juan, Puerto Rico. Lopez's excuse was that he could've continued to fight and that the referee only stopped the fight in that scenario because he had a bet placed on Salido to win the fight.

Then after almost 11 months of inactivity from the ring, Lopez finally returned to face Aldimar Silva on February 2, 2013. Lopez showed no signs of ring rust, dominating Silva from start to finish, before ultimately winning the fight by TKO in the ninth round. Just nearly 3 months later, he then faced Eugenio Lopez in Mexico on April 20, 2013. His fight Eugenio proved to be even easier than his destruction over Aldimar Silva when Lopez defeated him via lop-sided second-round knock-out.

== Personal life ==
López had a relationship with Bárbara De Jesús that lasted nine years. The couple has two children, which share the house with three siblings. The couple met in a public housing project in Juncos where López's mother lived. In the beginning López's family did not support the relationship because De Jesús had three children from a previous relation. They eventually moved together and established a residence in Caguas. De Jesús played a role in López's training, preparing seven daily meals and accompanying him in weight routines. Several members of their family used to attend his daily trainings, which he considered a "tranquility provider". De Jesús also used to be present in López's corner during fights, and received a salary for scheduling his daily agenda. The couple held their civil wedding in August 2009. A catholic wedding was subsequently held on July 18, 2010. In February 2011, only 7 months after his wedding, López filed a divorce claim against Bárbara De Jesús for undisclosed reasons.

In 2012, López started a relationship with Geraldine Crespo, whom she had met while training at the gym. In February 2013, the couple got engaged after his fight with Aldimar Silva. The couple married in August 2014 in a private wedding in Guaynabo, Puerto Rico. On October 31, 2015, Crespo presented a domestic abuse complaint against López after he allegedly hit her in the face after an argument. López went to court the next day and was released after paying bond.

López's professional success garnered him fame in Puerto Rico where he became a mainstream celebrity, having frequent participation in television segments transmitted throughout the archipelago. Due to this, he has attended public celebrations and other activities unrelated to pugilism, including the launch party for TV y Novelas Puerto Rico, a magazine focused in telenovelas. Outside of his own fights, López also attends other boxing cards as a spectator and performed as guest commentator in an event titled Guerra Civil II headlined by a fight between Iván Calderón and Nelson Dieppa. He also participates in charity work, including the WBO's Christmas gift giveaways.

== Professional boxing record ==
| 44 fights | 36 wins | 6 losses |
|---|---|---|
| By knockout | 32 | 6 |
| By decision | 4 | 0 |
| Draws | 2 | |

| No. | Result | Record | Opponent | Type | Round, time | Date | Location | Notes |
|---|---|---|---|---|---|---|---|---|
| 44 | Draw | 36–6–2 | Gallo The Producer | MD | 4 | November 22, 2025 | Coliseo Rubén Rodríguez, Bayamón, Puerto Rico | |
| 43 | Draw | 36–6–1 | Emiliano Martin Garcia | MD | 8 | May 18, 2019 | Coliseo Roger L. Mendoza, Caguas, Puerto Rico | |
| 42 | Win | 36–6 | Cristian Ruben Mino | UD | 10 | Nov 10, 2018 | Marlins Park, Miami, Florida, U.S. | |
| 41 | Loss | 35–6 | Jayson Vélez | TKO | 12 (12), 1:54 | Mar 3, 2018 | Coliseo Mario Quijote Morales, Guaynabo, Puerto Rico | |
| 40 | Win | 35–5 | Wilfredo Vázquez Jr. | TKO | 11 (12), 2:29 | Oct 29, 2016 | Roberto Clemente Coliseum, San Juan, Puerto Rico | |
| 39 | Loss | 34–5 | Jesús Cuellar | KO | 2 (12), 1:36 | Sep 11, 2014 | The Joint, Paradise, Nevada, U.S. | For WBA interim featherweight title |
| 38 | Loss | 34–4 | Francisco Vargas | RTD | 3 (10), 3:00 | Jul 12, 2014 | MGM Grand Garden Arena, Paradise, Nevada, U.S. | Lost WBO International super featherweight title; For vacant NABF super featherweight title |
| 37 | Win | 34–3 | Daniel Ponce de León | TKO | 2 (10), 2:42 | Mar 15, 2014 | Roberto Clemente Coliseum, San Juan, Puerto Rico | Won vacant WBO International super featherweight title |
| 36 | Loss | 33–3 | Mikey Garcia | TKO | 4 (12), 1:34 | Jun 15, 2013 | American Airlines Center Dallas, Texas, U.S. | For The Ring and vacant WBO featherweight titles |
| 35 | Win | 33–2 | Eugenio López | KO | 2 (10), 0:59 | Apr 20, 2013 | Mexico City Arena, Mexico City, Mexico | |
| 34 | Win | 32–2 | Aldimar Silva | TKO | 9 (10), 1:04 | Feb 2, 2013 | Coliseo Rubén Rodríguez, Bayamón, Puerto Rico | |
| 33 | Loss | 31–2 | Orlando Salido | TKO | 10 (12), 0:32 | Mar 10, 2012 | Roberto Clemente Coliseum, San Juan, Puerto Rico | For WBO featherweight title |
| 32 | Win | 31–1 | Mike Oliver | TKO | 2 (12), 2:32 | Oct 1, 2011 | Coliseo Rubén Rodríguez, Bayamón, Puerto Rico | Won WBO Latino interim featherweight title |
| 31 | Loss | 30–1 | Orlando Salido | TKO | 8 (12), 1:30 | Apr 16, 2011 | Coliseo Rubén Rodríguez, Bayamón, Puerto Rico | Lost WBO featherweight title |
| 30 | Win | 30–0 | Rafael Márquez | RTD | 8 (12), 3:00 | Nov 6, 2010 | MGM Grand Garden Arena, Paradise, Nevada, U.S. | Retained WBO featherweight title |
| 29 | Win | 29–0 | Bernabé Concepción | TKO | 2 (12), 2:37 | Jul 10, 2010 | José Miguel Agrelot Coliseum, Hato Rey, Puerto Rico | Retained WBO featherweight title |
| 28 | Win | 28–0 | Steven Luevano | TKO | 7 (12), 2:16 | Jan 23, 2010 | The Theater at Madison Square Garden, New York City, New York, U.S. | Won WBO featherweight title |
| 27 | Win | 27–0 | Rogers Mtagwa | UD | 12 | Oct 10, 2009 | The Theater at Madison Square Garden, New York City, New York, U.S. | Retained WBO junior featherweight title |
| 26 | Win | 26–0 | Olivier Lontchi | RTD | 9 (12), 3:00 | Jun 27, 2009 | Boardwalk Hall, Atlantic City, New Jersey, U.S. | Retained WBO junior featherweight title |
| 25 | Win | 25–0 | Gerry Peñalosa | RTD | 10 (12), 0:10 | Apr 25, 2009 | Coliseo Rubén Rodríguez, Bayamón, Puerto Rico | Retained WBO junior featherweight title |
| 24 | Win | 24–0 | Sergio Manuel Medina | TKO | 1 (12), 1:38 | Dec 6, 2008 | MGM Grand Garden Arena, Paradise, Nevada, U.S. | Retained WBO junior featherweight title |
| 23 | Win | 23–0 | Cesar Figueroa | KO | 1 (12), 0:47 | Oct 4, 2008 | José Miguel Agrelot Coliseum, Hato Rey, Puerto Rico | Retained WBO junior featherweight title |
| 22 | Win | 22–0 | Daniel Ponce de León | TKO | 1 (12), 2:25 | Jun 7, 2008 | Boardwalk Hall, Atlantic City, New Jersey, U.S. | Won WBO junior featherweight title |
| 21 | Win | 21–0 | Jonathan Oquendo | TKO | 3 (12), 0:49 | Feb 23, 2008 | Coliseo Héctor Solá Bezares, Caguas, Puerto Rico | Retained WBO Latino junior featherweight title |
| 20 | Win | 20–0 | Omar Adorno | TKO | 2 (12), 2:18 | Oct 31, 2007 | José Miguel Agrelot Coliseum, Hato Rey, Puerto Rico | Retained WBO Latino junior featherweight title |
| 19 | Win | 19–0 | Hugo Dianzo | TKO | 10 (12), 1:12 | Aug 4, 2007 | Allstate Arena, Rosemont, Illinois, U.S. | Retained WBO Latino junior featherweight title |
| 18 | Win | 18–0 | Giovanni Andrade | TKO | 1 (10), 2:59 | Jun 22, 2007 | José Miguel Agrelot Coliseum, Hato Rey, Puerto Rico | Won vacant WBO Latino junior featherweight title |
| 17 | Win | 17–0 | Jorge Otero | TKO | 7 (10) | Apr 28, 2007 | Universidad del Norte, Barranquilla, Colombia | |
| 16 | Win | 16–0 | Leivi Brea | TKO | 2 (10), 2:24 | Mar 3, 2007 | Roberto Clemente Coliseum, San Juan, Puerto Rico | |
| 15 | Win | 15–0 | Cuauhtemoc Vargas | RTD | 6 (10), 3:00 | Jan 19, 2007 | Dodge Theatre, Phoenix, Arizona, U.S. | |
| 14 | Win | 14–0 | Jose Alonso | TKO | 3 (12), 2:59 | Sep 30, 2006 | Coliseo Héctor Solá Bezares, Caguas, Puerto Rico | Won vacant WBO Latino junior featherweight title |
| 13 | Win | 13–0 | Edel Ruiz | RTD | 7 (8), 0:02 | Jul 21, 2006 | Mohegan Sun Arena, Montville, Connecticut, U.S. | |
| 12 | Win | 12–0 | Sergio Mendez | UD | 6 | Jun 10, 2006 | Madison Square Garden, New York City, New York, U.S. | |
| 11 | Win | 11–0 | Alberto Chuc | TKO | 6 (10), 0:02 | Apr 7, 2006 | Pedrín Zorrilla Coliseum, San Juan, Puerto Rico | |
| 10 | Win | 10–0 | Gilberto Bolanos | UD | 8 | Mar 4, 2006 | Coliseo Rubén Rodríguez, Bayamón, Puerto Rico | |
| 9 | Win | 9–0 | Jose Luis Caro | KO | 3 (6), 1:44 | Jan 21, 2006 | Thomas & Mack Center, Paradise, Nevada, U.S. | |
| 8 | Win | 8–0 | Manuel Sarabia | TKO | 1 (6), 2:50 | Dec 10, 2005 | Roberto Clemente Coliseum, San Juan, Puerto Rico | |
| 7 | Win | 7–0 | Luis Bolano | RTD | 3 (6), 0:10 | Nov 18, 2005 | Pedrín Zorrilla Coliseum, San Juan, Puerto Rico | |
| 6 | Win | 6–0 | Roberto Chacon | KO | 1 (6), 2:10 | Sep 30, 2005 | Pedrín Zorrilla Coliseum, San Juan, Puerto Rico | |
| 5 | Win | 5–0 | Charles Jones | KO | 1 (4), 3:00 | Aug 20, 2005 | Auditorio Juan Pachín Vicéns, Ponce, Puerto Rico | |
| 4 | Win | 4–0 | Eric Nemo | TKO | 3 (4), 1:23 | Jun 11, 2005 | Madison Square Garden, New York City, New York, U.S. | |
| 3 | Win | 3–0 | Efrain Perez | KO | 1 (4) | Apr 30, 2005 | José Miguel Agrelot Coliseum, Hato Rey, Puerto Rico | |
| 2 | Win | 2–0 | Ivan Cordero | TKO | 1 (4) | Feb 26, 2005 | Coliseo Rubén Rodríguez, Bayamón, Puerto Rico | |
| 1 | Win | 1–0 | Luis Daniel Colon | KO | 1 (4), 1:06 | Jan 29, 2005 | Coliseo Rubén Rodríguez, Bayamón, Puerto Rico | |

== Titles in boxing ==
=== Major world titles ===
- WBO junior featherweight champion (122 lbs)
- WBO featherweight champion (126 lbs)

=== Regional/International titles ===
- WBO Latino junior featherweight champion (122 lbs) (2x)
- WBC Latino interim featherweight champion (126 lbs)
- WBO International super featherweight title (130 lbs)

== See also ==
- List of Puerto Rican boxing world champions

Sporting positions
Regional boxing titles
| Vacant Title last held by Cecilio Santos | WBO Latino junior featherweight champion September 30, 2006 – December 2006; Vacated | Vacant Title next held by Carlos Oliveira |
| Vacant Title last held by Carlos Oliveira | WBO Latino junior featherweight champion June 22, 2007 – June 7, 2008; Won world title | Vacant Title next held by Alex De Oliveira |
| Vacant Title last held by Jesús Cuellar | WBO Latino featherweight champion October 1, 2011 – October 14, 2011; Vacated | Vacant Title next held by Orlando Cruz |
| Vacant Title last held by Liam Walsh | WBO Latino junior lightweight champion March 15, 2014 – July 12, 2014 | Vacant Title next held by Francisco Vargas |
World boxing titles
| Preceded by Daniel Ponce de León | WBO junior featherweight champion June 7, 2008 – January 2010; Vacated | Vacant Title next held by Wilfredo Vázquez Jr. |
| Preceded by Steven Luevano | WBO featherweight champion January 23, 2010 – April 16, 2011 | Succeeded by Orlando Salido |
