= Top Rank =

American boxing promotional company

Top Rank, Inc.
- Logo used since 2012.
- Type: Privately held company
- Industry: Boxing promotion
- Predecessor: Main Bout
- Founded: 1973; 53 years ago
- Founder: Jabir Herbert Muhammad; Bob Arum
- Headquarters: Las Vegas, Nevada, United States
- Key people: Bob Arum (CEO)
- Website: www.toprank.com

Top Rank, Inc. is an American boxing promotional company founded by Jabir Herbert Muhammad and Bob Arum, which was incorporated in 1973, and is based in Las Vegas, Nevada.

Since its founding, Top Rank has promoted many world class fighters, including Muhammad Ali, Alexis Argüello, Terence Crawford, Oscar De La Hoya, Roberto Durán, Joe Frazier, George Foreman, Marvin Hagler, Juan Manuel Márquez, Manny Pacquiao, Sugar Ray Leonard, Floyd Mayweather Jr., Érik Morales, Thomas Hearns, Paulie Ayala, Iran Barkley, Michael Carbajal, Larry Holmes, Ray Mancini, Carlos Monzón, Terry Norris, Gabriel Ruelas, Rafael Ruelas, James Toney, Kubrat Pulev, Jared Anderson, Nico Ali Walsh, Guido Vianello and Tyson Fury.

The company has promoted such superfights as Hagler vs Leonard, Chávez vs De La Hoya, Holyfield vs Foreman, Foreman vs Moorer, Leonard vs Hearns, Hagler vs Hearns, Ali vs Frazier II and both Ali vs Spinks fights. The company also promoted George Foreman's comeback to regain the world championship, culminating in the knockout of then IBF/WBA champion Michael Moorer on November 5, 1994.

== History ==
=== Main Bout ===
The precursor to Top Rank was Main Bout, a company founded by Muhammad Ali in 1966 to promote his fights. Along with Muhammad Ali, other early equity owners of the company included Jabir Herbert Muhammad, Bob Arum, and John Ali (chief aide to Nation of Islam leader Elijah Muhammad). The company was founded after the Muhammad Ali vs. Floyd Patterson fight, and the company mainly handled Ali's boxing promotions and pay-per-view closed-circuit television broadcasts in the late 1960s. The company's stockholders included several other fellow Nation of Islam members.

=== Top Rank Boxing on ESPN ===
In the early 1980s, Top Rank Boxing and then-fledgling ESPN formed a partnership to bring a weekly boxing to the cable network which culminated with the first regularly televised boxing series since 1964. The first event was held on April 10, 1980, in Atlantic City, when middleweight Frank Fletcher decisioned Ben Serrano. The original Top Rank Boxing on ESPN was the longest-running cable series and weekly boxing series in history, after celebrating its 16th consecutive year in 1996. ESPN broke away from the contract afterward, replacing it with Friday Night Fights—a new series that would feature fights from other promotions and aired on ESPN2.

In July 2017, Top Rank began to soft launch a new broadcasting agreement with ESPN, beginning with Manny Pacquiao vs. Jeff Horn, followed by two more cards in August. That month, ESPN officially announced a multi-year agreement, calling for events airing across ESPN linear and digital properties (including its recently launched subscription service ESPN+), and an option to carry events on pay-per-view. On August 2, 2018, ESPN extended the agreement through 2025. This coverage ended in 2025.

==== Announcers ====
- Kenneth Anderson (a.k.a. Mr. Kennedy / Mr. Anderson)

===== Blow-by-blow =====
- Sal Marchiano (1980–1983)
- Sam Rosen (1983–1986)
- Al Bernstein (1986–1996)
- Don Chevrier (1987–1988)
- Tom Kelly (1988–1989)
- Barry Tompkins (1989–1994, 2010–2011)
- Bob Papa (1996–2003)
- Joe Tessitore (2003–2025)
- Bob Sheridan (2010–2016)
- Brian Kenny (2012, 2016)

===== Color commentators =====
- Al Bernstein (1980–1986, 1987–1998)
- Tommy Hearns (1980)
- Randy Gordon (1980–1982)
- Donald Curry (1985)
- Dave Bontempo (1986–1998)
- Teddy Atlas (1998–2017)
- Larry Merchant (2013–2014)
- Timothy Bradley (2016–2025)
- Andre Ward (2017–2023)
- Mark Kriegel (2017–2025)

== Current boxers ==
| Boxer | Nationality | Weight | Record | Title |
|---|---|---|---|---|
| Jared Alexander | (United States) American | Heavyweight | 17-1 (15 KO) | |
| Ali Feliz | (United States) American | Heavyweight | 5-0 (4 KO) | |
| Bakhodir Jalolov | (Uzbekistan) Uzbekistani | Heavyweight | 14-0 (14 KO) | |
| Damian Knyba | (Poland) Polish | Heavyweight | 15-0 (9 KO) | |
| Richard Torrez Jr. | (United States) American | Heavyweight | 10-0 (10 KO) | |
| Janibek Alimkhanuly | (Kazakhstan) Kazakhstani | Middleweight | 15-0 (10 KO) | WBO, IBF World Champion |
| Jahi Tucker | (United States) American | Middleweight | 11-1-1 (5 KO) | |
| Christian Mbilli | (Canada) Canadian | Super middleweight | 27-0 (23 KO) | |
| Xander Zayas | (Puerto Rico) Puerto Rican | Junior middleweight | 19-0 (12 KO) | |
| Art Barrera Jr. | (United States) American | Welterweight | 6-0 (4 KO) | |
| Brian Norman Jr. | (United States) American | Welterweight | 26-0 (20 KO) | WBO World Champion |
| Giovani Santillan | (United States) American | Welterweight | 32-1 (17 KO) | |
| Lindolfo Delgado | (Mexico) Mexican | Junior welterweight | 20-0 (15 KO) | |
| Tiger Johnson | (United States) American | Junior welterweight | 13-0 (6 KO) | |
| Teofimo Lopez | (United States) American | Junior welterweight | 21-1 (13 KO) | WBO World Champion |
| Rohan Polanco | (Dominican Republic) Dominican | Junior welterweight | 13-0 (8 KO) | |
| Emiliano Fernando Vargas | (United States) American | Junior welterweight | 11-0 (9 KO) | |
| Keyshawn Davis | (United States) American | Lightweight | 11-0 (7 KO) | |
| Abdullah Mason | (United States) American | Lightweight | 14-0 (12 KO) | |
| Raymond Muratalla | (United States) American | Lightweight | 21-0 (16 KO) | |
| Robson Conceição | (Brazil) Brazilian | Junior lightweight | 19-2-1 (9 KO) | WBC World Champion |
| O'Shaquie Foster | (United States) American | Junior lightweight | 22-3 (12 KO) | Former WBC World Champion |
| Emanuel Navarrete | (Mexico) Mexican | Junior lightweight | 39-2-1 (32 KO) (1 nc) | WBO World Champion |
| Demler Zamora | (United States) American | Junior lightweight | 13-0 (9 KO) | |
| Bruce Carrington | (United States) American | Featherweight | 12-0 (8 KO) | |
| Rafael Espinoza | (Mexico) Mexican | Featherweight | 25-0 (21 KO) | WBO World Champion |
| Albert Gonzalez | (United States) American | Featherweight | 10-0 (6 KO) | |
| Julius Ballo | (United States) American | Featherweight | 0-0 | |
| Steven Navarro | (United States) American | Junior bantamweight | 2-0 (1 KO) | |
| Floyd Diaz | (United States) American | Bantamweight | 12-0 (3 KO) | |

== Notable fighters ==
- Muhammad Ali
- Mikey Garcia
- Miguel Cotto
- Floyd Mayweather
- Oscar De La Hoya
- Mike Alvarado
- Jorge Arce
- Urbano Antillon
- José Benavidez
- Timothy Bradley
- Iván Calderón
- José Luis Castillo
- Martín Castillo
- Julio César Chávez Jr.
- Omar Chávez
- Joshua Clottey
- Bernabe Concepcion
- Terence Crawford
- Kid Diamond
- David Díaz
- Nonito Donaire
- Esquiva Falcão
- Yuri Foreman
- Yuriorkis Gamboa
- Miguel Angel Garcia
- Kendall Holt
- Demetrius Hopkins
- Miguel Angel Huerta
- Nobuhiro Ishida
- Jesus Soto Karass
- Vasiliy Lomachenko
- Juan Manuel Lopez
- Francisco Lorenzo
- Steven Luevano
- Antonio Margarito
- Raul Martinez
- Vanes Martirosyan
- Egor Mekhontsev
- Fernando Montiel
- Tommy Morrison
- Ryota Murata
- Manny Pacquiao
- Arnold Barboza Jr.
- Kelly Pavlik
- Anthony Peterson
- Lamont Peterson
- Hasim Rahman
- Brandon Rios
- Marco Antonio Rubio
- Andy Ruiz
- Mario Santiago
- Giovanni Segura
- Jorge Solís
- Ulises Solís
- Glen Tapia
- Anthony Thompson
- Ricardo Torres
- Brian Viloria
- José Luis Zertuche
- Shiming Zou
- Isaac Dogboe
- Luis Alberto Lopez
- Robeisy Ramirez
- Naoya Inoue
- Seniesa Estrada
- Andrew Moloney
- Jason Moloney
- Oscar Valdez
- Juan Manuel Márquez
- Artur Beterbiev
- Tyson Fury
- Jose Pedraza
- Josh Taylor
- Elvis Rodriguez
- Kelvin Davis
- Mikaela Mayer

== Other events ==
Early in its history, Top Rank promoted the Snake River Canyon jump of daredevil Evel Knievel in September 1974. The event, at Twin Falls, Idaho, was shown live on paid closed circuit television in hundreds of theaters, for about ten dollars each. The steam-powered Skycycle X-2 had a premature deployment of its parachute and Knievel survived.
