= Marcos Ramirez (boxer) =

American boxer (born 1981)

Marcos Ramírez
Personal information
- Nickname: Flaco
- Nationality: American
- Born: Marcos Ramírez; March 31, 1981 (age 45) Des Moines, Iowa
- Height: 5 ft 8 in (175 cm)
- Weight: Featherweight

Boxing career
- Reach: 70 in (180 cm)
- Stance: Orthodox

Boxing record
- Total fights: 27
- Wins: 25
- Win by KO: 16
- Losses: 1
- Draws: 0
- No contests: 1

Marcos Ramírez (born March 31, 1981) is an American former professional boxer who competed from 2000 to 2008. Ramírez is a former WBO-NABO and IBF Latino featherweight champion.

== Personal life ==
Marcos a current firefighter, was once 21-0 and on the fast track to a shot at the world Featherweight championship. Until his first-born son, Diego, died unexpectedly in January 2006 at the age of 13 months. All Ramírez knows is that there was a fever that did not subside. He lost his passion for boxing after Diego's death. After a brief comeback, he retired from boxing in 2008 with a career record of 25–1. "It changed who I was," Ramírez says during his shift as a back-end man at the firehouse. "A big chunk of my heart was ripped out."

== Professional career ==
On October 4, 2008, Ramírez fought Yuriorkis Gamboa after a long layoff and had Gamboa staggered in the first round but would go on to lose the bout.
