= Mario Santiago =

Puerto Rican boxer

Personal information
- Nickname: El Principe Ponceño
- Nationality: Puerto Rico
- Born: Mario Santiago Figueroa; July 13, 1978 (age 47) Ponce, Puerto Rico
- Weight: Featherweight

Boxing career
- Stance: Southpaw

Boxing record
- Total fights: 19
- Wins: 18
- Win by KO: 13
- Losses: 1
- Draws: 0
- No contests: 0

Mario Santiago Figueroa (born July 13, 1978) is a Puerto Rican professional boxer. Santiago debuted as a professional in 2000, and is the current World Boxing Council Caribbean Featherweight Champion.

== Amateur career ==
Santiago Figueroa started boxing when he was seven years old, in his hometown of Ponce, Puerto Rico. He was trained by his late uncle Edwin and his father Mario Santiago, Sr., who were both boxers.

Santiago Figueroa did not enter an amateur tournament until he was 15 years old. His first fight was for the Puerto Rico Southern Region Amateur Title which he won. He caught the eye of the Puerto Rico National Team trainers and seven fights later he was fighting abroad with the National team at the age of 16. He went on to represent Puerto Rico in many amateur tournaments including the 1999 Pan-Am games in Canada where he lost a close decision for the bronze medal. Santiago Figueroa competed on the 2000 Olympic Trials but did not qualify and opted to turn pro in 2000. He finished his amateur career with an 52–3 record.

== Professional career ==
Santiago Figueroa debuted as a professional in 2000 under the direction of Felix Trinidad Sr. and Cesar Seda. He was part of the Trinidad Stable which at the time included former World Champions Félix Trinidad, Nelson Dieppa, Alex Sánchez, and title contenders Fres Oquendo, Carlos Quintana and Daniel Seda. Santiago Figueroa was signed by Don King Productions until Felix Trinidad retired in 2002. He was released and was left with no management. During this time Santiago Figueroa moved to the state of Pennsylvania to look for other opportunities in boxing. In Penssylvania he trained with Barry Strumph and Syd Brumbach and, in 2004, he signed with Gary Shaw Productions where his career blossomed fighting 7 times in 2004.

In 2005 Hector Santiago and Evangelista Cotto, uncle and trainer of World Champion Miguel Cotto, obtained Santiago Figueroa's management rights. Santiago Figueroa returned to his Amateur trainer Jose “Pancha” Aneiro and was back in the ring on October 8, 2005, scoring a 3rd-round KO and 2 weeks later he was the Shobox co-feature bout against the IBF #15 ranked featherweight contender Cornelius “Master” Lock at the Chumash Casino in California. This was the most important fight of Santiago Figueroa's career and one that got him recognition with the media and the fans. Since his 2005 comeback Mario has defeated his last 7 opponents by Knockout. Santiago's next scheduled match was against Daniel Attah in a fight that took place on March 10, 2007, in Ponce. Santiago won the fight by technical knockout in the ninth round. Santiago lost his first fight on July 28, 2007, in a fight against Héctor Velázquez. He remained inactive until February 1, 2008, when he was scheduled to fight Edel Ruiz, whom he defeated by knockout in the first round.

Steven Luevano's victory against Antonio Davis and Terdsak Jandaeng was tested in his third defense on June 28, 2008, night's David Diaz-Manny Pacquiao undercard at Mandalay Bay Events Center. Luevano retained his 126-pound belt via split draw with Santiago Figueroa. Judge Harry Davis scored it 117-111 for Luevano, Duane Ford had it 115-113 for Santiago and Dave Moretti had it 114-114. ESPN.com also had it 114-114. Luevano landed 215 of 641 punches (34%) while Santiago connected on 214 of 835 (26%).

== Personal information ==
Santiago Figueroais married to Caroline Santiago and they have two daughters: Carimar and Yarieli. In his spare time, Santiago Figueroa spends time at his church, where he plays timbales for the church band.

== Professional Championships ==
Preceded by vacant	Caribbean Boxing Federation Featherweight Title; August 19, 2006–present	Succeeded by current
