= Carl Frampton vs. Léo Santa Cruz II =

Boxing match

- Date: January 28, 2017
- Venue: MGM Grand Garden Arena, Paradise, Nevada, U.S.
- Title(s) on the line: WBA (Super) featherweight title

Tale of the tape
Boxer	Carl Frampton	Léo Santa Cruz
Nickname	"The Jackal"	"El Terremoto"
Hometown	Belfast, Northern Ireland, UK	Huetamo, Michoacán, Mexico
Purse	$1,000,000	$900,000
Pre-fight record	23–0 (14 KO)	32–1–1 (18 KO)
Age	29 years, 11 months	28 years, 5 months
Height	5 ft 5 in (165 cm)	5 ft 7 1/2 in (171 cm)
Weight	125 lb (57 kg)	125 lb (57 kg)
Style	Orthodox	Orthodox
Recognition	WBA (Super); Featherweight Champion; TBRB; No. 1 Ranked Featherweight; The Ring; No. 2 Ranked Featherweight; The Ring No. 10 ranked pound-for-pound fighter 2-division world champion	WBA; No. 2 Ranked Featherweight; The Ring; No. 4 Ranked Featherweight; TBRB; No. 5 Ranked Featherweight; 3-division world champion

Result
- Santa Cruz defeats Frampton by majority decision

Carl Frampton vs. Léo Santa Cruz II was a professional boxing match contested on January 28, 2017, for the WBA featherweight championship.

== Background ==
A rematch between Frampton and Santa Cruz was finalised in October. There was talks the fight would take place in Frampton's home town of Belfast; however, the venue was confirmed to be at the MGM Grand in Las Vegas, the first time Frampton would fight there since becoming a professional. The date was set for 28 January 2017.

Speaking at a press conference at the Europa Hotel, Belfast, Santa Cruz said his preparations for the first fight were affected by his father's bone cancer and with it now in remission, the former champion expected to improve in the rematch saying "He was with me for the three weeks only before the bout. My dad was going through cancer and I wasn't 100% focused on my training. We are going to train 100% and my Dad is going to be with me for the whole camp. Preparations are going to go a lot better and while I know it is going to be another tough and really close fight, we are hoping to get the victory this time." In response Frampton said "No doubt, Leo went through a difficult time with his father's illness as anybody would in that situation, but he threw over a thousand punches in the fight. He was very fit. He was punching right to the end and you can't throw much more than a thousand punches in a fight. I don't think he's going to improve his work-rate. He may come up with a bit of a different game plan but whatever he comes up with, I believe I'll be able to deal with it."

It was hoped that a win for Frampton would set up an all british unification bout in the summer against IBF champion Lee Selby, who was set to defend his belt against Jonathan Victor Barros on the Frampton Santa Cruz undercard. However, the day before the fight was set to set place it abruptly cancelled by the Nevada State Athletic Commission stating the challenger didn't meet their "fight requirements".

Frampton was a 5/9 favourite to win with Santa Cruz at 7/5.

== The fights ==
=== Undercard ===
The undercard saw wins for Josh Taylor, David Benavidez and Ivan Redkach.

=== Zlatičanin vs. Garcia ===
Dejan Zlatičanin vs. Mikey Garcia
- Title(s) on the line: WBC lightweight title

Tale of the tape
Boxer	Dejan Zlatičanin	Mikey Garcia
Nickname	"Dynamite"	
Hometown	Podgorica, Podgorica, Montenegro	Oxnard, California, U.S.
Purse	$320,000	$375,000
Pre-fight record	22–0 (15 KO)	35–0 (29 KO)
Age	32 years, 9 months	29 years, 1 month
Height	5 ft 4 in (163 cm)	5 ft 6 in (168 cm)
Weight	134 1/2 lb (61 kg)	134 1/2 lb (61 kg)
Style	Orthodox	Orthodox
Recognition	WBC; Lightweight Champion; The Ring; No. 1 Ranked Lightweight; TBRB; No. 2 Ranked Lightweight	WBC; No. 2 Ranked Lightweight; 2-division world champion

Result
- Garcia defeats Zlatičanin by 3rd round KO

The co-featured bout saw undefeated WBC lightweight champion Dejan Zlatičanin make the first defence of his title against 2-division world champion Mikey Garcia.

==== The fight ====
From the opening bell the challenger controlled Zlatičanin with a sharp and accurate jab a while mixing in combinations. The shorter champion tried to press forward in an attempt to get inside but found it difficult to get past jab. In the 3rd round Garcia landed a two punch combination starting with an uppercut which led Zlatičanin open for a final right hook which dropped Zlatičanin backwards on the floor. Referee Tony Weeks stopped the fight immediately, giving Garcia a KO victory and making him a 3-division world champion.

Garcia landed 50 punches of 176 thrown (28.4%), whilst Zlatičanin landed only 16 of 60 (26.7%).

==== Aftermath ====
In the post fight interview, Garcia said "I'm very happy with the performance. We were controlling the pace and distance right away from the first round. I saw some openings and I thought I could hurt him later down the road, but I wasn't expecting it to be that soon in the fight." He also said that he would like to unify the division and also mentioned fighting undefeated Terence Crawford at light welterweight. Zlatičanin for his part gave Garcia credit for his victory saying "I was just getting ready to pick it up a little bit and I got between the ropes and then he hit me with a good, hard punch. Mikey is a good fighter without a doubt. I never was able to get into the fight."

Preceded by vs. Franklin Mamani	Dejan Zlatičanin's bouts 28 January 2017	Succeeded by vs. Hevinson Herrera
Preceded by vs. Elio Rojas	Mikey Garcia's bouts 28 January 2017	Succeeded by vs. Adrien Broner

=== Main Event ===
10,085 were in attendance as the two again fought a very close and competitive bout. Santa Cruz heavily relied on his jab and made used his height and reach advantage. Compared to the first fight he used more boxing skills and reframed from engaging in as much slugging with the champion. However there were moments such as the final minute of the 4th round where the two men engaged in a fiery exchange with each of them giving and taking shots. Frampton was able to back Santa Cruz up in the 7th, landing left hands to the head of the former champion. The final three rounds featured much toe to toe action and the fight ended with the two men engaged in a heavy exchange in the centre of the ring before embracing at the final bell.

The fight went to the judges, Burt Clements scored the fight 114–114 while Dave Moretti and Glenn Feldman both had it 115–113 in favour of Santa Cruz giving him the victory by majority decision.

ESPN and The Daily Telegraph scored the fight 115–113 for Santa Cruz while The Guardian scored it for Frampton 115–113.

Frampton only landed 133 of his 592 punches thrown (22.4%) whereas Santa Cruz landed 230 of his 884 thrown (26.0%).

== Aftermath ==
In the post-fight interview, Santa Cruz said, "Before the fight I said I wanted revenge and I wanted to work hard. I went to the gym and I worked hard, and I did what I had to do. Carl Frampton is a good fighter. Let's make it a third fight!" Frampton offered no excuses saying "Leo probably deserved it. It was my fault and I want to apologise to the travelling fans, I hope we can do it again - we need to do it again. It was a very tough fight. Some of the rounds were close. I really think Leo deserved it. He was very clever and he used his reach. I think he deserved it. I'm being honest. I think he deserved it. But it was a very good fight. I think I can perform slightly better. No excuses."

Nielsen Media Research reported the fight averaged 587,000 and peaked at 643,000 viewers.

Plans for an immediate third fight between Santa Cruz and Frampton were ended when the WBA ordered Santa Cruz to negotiate with regular titleholder Abner Mares for a mandatory defence, a rematch of their August 2015 bout. Days later the IBF ordered that the previously planned bout between Selby and Barros go to purse bids ending speculation of an immediate match up between the two.

== Undercard ==
Confirmed bouts:

Winner	Loser	Weight division/title belt(s) disputed	Result
(United States) Mikey Garcia	(Montenegro) Dejan Zlatičanin	WBC World Lightweight title	3rd round KO
(Ukraine) Ivan Redkach	(United States) Demond Brock	Lightweight (8 rounds)	8th round TKO
(United States) David Benavidez	(Uzbekistan) Sherali Mamajonov	Super Middleweight (8 rounds)	2nd round KO
(United Kingdom) Josh Taylor	(United States) Alfonso Olvera	Light Welterweight (8 rounds)	Unanimous decision
Preliminary bouts
(Cuba) Leduan Barthelemy	(United States) Jesus Aguinaga	Featherweight (6 rounds)	Unanimous decision
(United States) Herbert Acevedo	(United States) Chris Singleton	Welterweight (6 rounds)	Unanimous decision
(United States) Antonio Santa Cruz	(United States) Victor Torres	Bantamweight (4 rounds)	Unanimous decision
(United States) Jerry Perez	(United States) Javier Cepeda	Featherweight (4 rounds)	1st round TKO

== Broadcasting ==
Country	Broadcaster
Panama	RPC-TV
United Kingdom	Sky Sports
United States	Showtime

Preceded by First bout	Carl Frampton's bouts 28 January 2017	Succeeded by vs. Horacio García
Preceded by First bout	Léo Santa Cruz's bouts 28 January 2017	Succeeded by vs. Chris Avalos
