= Tomas Villa =

Mexican boxer

Personal information
- Nickname: El Norteno
- Born: Tomás Alfonso Villa Sánchez; 14 July 1983 Ojinaga, Chihuahua, Mexico
- Died: 3 April 2018 (aged 34)
- Height: 168 cm (5 ft 6 in)
- Weight: Featherweight

Boxing career
- Reach: 163 cm (64 in)
- Stance: Orthodox

Boxing record
- Total fights: 36
- Wins: 23
- Win by KO: 14
- Losses: 8
- Draws: 5

Tomas Villa (14 July 1983 - 3 April 2018) was a Mexican professional boxer and was the former IBA featherweight champion.

== Professional career ==
On 18 July 2008 Villa beat Gilberto Sanchez-Leon to win the IBA featherweight championship.

In April 2010, Villa lost to undefeated Mikey Garcia on the undercard of Antonio Margarito vs. Roberto García.
