= Sergey Rabchenko =

Belarusian boxer

Personal information
- Nationality: Belarusian
- Born: Siarhei Rabchanka; 23 February 1986 (age 40) Minsk, Belarus
- Height: 5 ft 10 in (1.78 m)
- Weight: Light middleweight

Boxing career
- Stance: Orthodox

Boxing record
- Total fights: 35
- Wins: 30
- Win by KO: 22
- Losses: 5
- Draws: 0
- No contests: 0

Sergey Rabchenko (birth name: Siarhei Rabchanka, born 23 February 1986 in Minsk) is a Belarusian professional boxer. He currently fights in the light middleweight division.

== Professional career ==
After an amateur career which consisted of 217 wins from 238 fights, Rabchenko made his professional debut in September 2006 with a first-round knock-out victory over Andrei Matveeu in Minsk. Since 2011 he has been based in the United Kingdom, where he is promoted by Hatton Promotions and is trained by Ricky Hatton. After a second-round knockout over Martin Concepcion in his first fight in the UK he competed in his first twelve-round fight, beating Bradley Pryce by a unanimous decision. In June 2012 he won his first significant title when he beat Ryan Rhodes in the seventh round via a body shot to win the EBU light middleweight belt. He made the first defence of his title against Cedric Vitu at the Manchester Arena in November 2012 where he won by split decision.

Rabchenko recorded his first professional loss against Australian Anthony Mundine.

== Professional boxing record ==
35 fights	30 wins	5 losses
By knockout	22	2
By decision	8	3

No.	Result	Record	Opponent	Type	Round, time	Date	Location	Notes
35	Win	30-5	(Belarus) Aliaksandr Dzemka	PTS	6 (6)	2019-10-12	(Belarus) MGC Club, Minsk	
34	Loss	29–5	(Spain) Sergio García	UD	12 (12)	2019-06-22	(United Kingdom) Polideportivo Vicente Trueba, Torrelavega	For EBU Light Middleweight title.
33	Loss	29–4	(Russia) Ismail Iliev	UD	10	2018-09-21	(Russia) The Corner Boxing Gym, Moscow	
32	Loss	29–3	(United Kingdom) Kell Brook	KO	2 (12)	2018-03-03	(United Kingdom) FlyDSA Arena, Sheffield, England	For vacant WBC Silver super-welterweight title
31	Win	29–2	(Belarus) Siarhei Krapshyla	TKO	2 (6)	2017-09-23	(Belarus) Palace of Culture, Borisov	
30	Win	28–2	(Georgia (country)) Robizoni Omsarashvili	KO	1 (6)	2016-12-09	(Belarus) Palace of Sport, Minsk	
29	Loss	27–2	(United States) Tony Harrison	TKO	9 (12)	30 Jul 2016	(United States) Barclays Center, Brooklyn, New York, US	
28	Win	27–1	(Nicaragua) Miguel Aguilar	RTD	3 (8)	2016-02-19	(United Kingdom) Walsall Town Hall, Walsall, England	
27	Win	26–1	(Argentina) Walter Osvaldo Gaston Calvo	TKO	4 (8)	2015-05-09	(Bulgaria) Gymnasium of Natural Sciences and Mathematics, Vratsa	
26	Loss	25–1	(Australia) Anthony Mundine	SD	12	2014-11-12	(Australia) Melbourne Park Multi Purpose Venue, Melbourne, Victoria	Lost WBC Silver Light Middleweight title.
25	Win	25–0	(United Kingdom) Bradley Pryce	UD	12	2013-11-16	(Bulgaria) Gymnasium of Natural Sciences and Mathematics, Vratsa	Retained EBU and WBC Silver Light Middleweight titles.
24	Win	24–0	(Georgia (country)) Gari Abajiani	TKO	3 (8)	2013-07-16	(Belarus) Moulin Rouge Club, Minsk	
23	Win	23–0	(Italy) Adriano Nicchi	KO	2 (12), 2:15	2013-03-30	(Monaco) Salle des Étoiles, Monte Carlo	Retained EBU Light Middleweight title.
22	Win	22–0	(France) Cédric Vitu	SD	12	2012-11-24	(United Kingdom) Manchester Arena, Manchester, England	Retained EBU, Won vacant WBC Silver Light Middleweight title.
21	Win	21–0	(United Kingdom) Ryan Rhodes	TKO	7 (12), 2:54	2012-06-16	(United Kingdom) Manchester Velodrome, Manchester, England	Won vacant EBU Light Middleweight title.
20	Win	20–0	(Germany) Ronny Gabel	KO	1 (8), 0:21	2012-03-24	(United Kingdom) Ponds Forge Arena, Sheffield, England	
19	Win	19–0	(Ukraine) Volodymyr Borovskyy	TKO	8 (8)	2011-11-03	(Belarus) Gagarin Club, Minsk	
18	Win	18–0	(United Kingdom) Kevin McCauley	TKO	1 (8), 1:10	2011-07-23	(United Kingdom) Castle Leisure Centre, Bury, England	
17	Win	17–0	(United Kingdom) Bradley Pryce	UD	12	2011-05-20	(United Kingdom) Deeside Leisure Centre, Queensferry, Wales	
16	Win	16–0	(United Kingdom) Martin Concepcion	TKO	2 (8), 1:41	2011-02-26	(United Kingdom) Reebok Stadium, Bolton, England	
15	Win	15–0	(Ukraine) Roman Dzhuman	TKO	6 (10), 0:48	2010-10-21	(Belarus) Club Reaktor, Minsk	
14	Win	14–0	(Georgia (country)) Mikheil Khutsishvili	KO	3 (6)	2010-07-31	(Belarus) Club Reaktor, Minsk	
13	Win	13–0	(Germany) Pietro d'Alessio	TKO	1 (10), 1:59	2010-03-12	(Czech Republic) Millennium Theatre, Prague	
12	Win	12–0	(Belarus) Aliaksei Konovko	TKO	4 (8)	2010-02-09	(Belarus) Club Reaktor, Minsk	
11	Win	11–0	(France) Loic D' Arx	TKO	1 (6), 2:55	2009-11-13	(France) Casino de Deauville, Deauville	
10	Win	10–0	(Belarus) Siarhei Navarka	TKO	4 (10)	2009-10-13	(Belarus) Club Reaktor, Minsk	
9	Win	9–0	(Ukraine) Boris Akopov	KO	3 (6)	2009-07-18	(Ukraine) Sportpalace, Odessa	
8	Win	8–0	(Belarus) Dzmitri Yanushevich	TKO	1 (8)	2009-05-30	(Belarus) Boxing Gym, Minsk	
7	Win	7–0	(Belarus) Siarhei Labkou	TKO	4 (8)	2009-03-24	(Belarus) Club Reaktor, Minsk	
6	Win	6–0	(Belarus) Aliaksandr Abramenka	TKO	3 (6)	2008-12-22	(Belarus) Club Reaktor, Minsk	
5	Win	5–0	(Belarus) Aleh Mihailau	UD	4	2008-11-27	(Belarus) Restaurant Grodno, Grodno	
4	Win	4–0	(Belarus) Uladzimir Sazonau	UD	6	2008-07-06	(Belarus) Restaurant Grodno, Grodno	
3	Win	3–0	(Belarus) Siarhei Navarka	UD	6	2008-05-10	(Belarus) Palace of Sport, Minsk	
2	Win	2–0	(Belarus) Yauheni Kafanau	UD	4	2006-10-31	(Belarus) Minsk	
1	Win	1–0	(Belarus) Andrei Matveeu	KO	1 (4)	2006-09-28	(Belarus) Minsk	Professional debut.

Sporting positions
Regional boxing titles
Vacant Title last held by Lukáš Konečný	EBU Super-welterweight champion June 16, 2012 – 2014; Vacated	Vacant Title next held by Isaac Real
