= Lee Jae-sung (disambiguation) =

Lee Jae-sung is a South Korean international football winger for Mainz 05

Lee Jae-sung may also refer to:

- Lee Jae-sung (boxer) (born 1983), South Korean boxer
- Lee Jae-sung (footballer, born 1988), South Korea international football defender for Chungnam Asan FC
