= Millennium Theatre =

Millennium Theatre may refer to:

- Millennium Theatre (Prague), Czech Republic
- Millennium Theatre, Limerick, Ireland
- Millennium Theatre, former name of Sight & Sound Theatres' theatre in Ronks, Lancaster County, Pennsylvania, USA
- Millennium Theater, former name of Master Theater, Brighton Beach, New York City

== See also ==
- Millennium Forum, theatre in Derry, Northern Ireland
- Millennium Stage, John F. Kennedy Center for the Performing Arts, Washington, D.C.
- Wales Millennium Centre, theatre complex in Cardiff
