= Shemuel Pagan =

American boxer

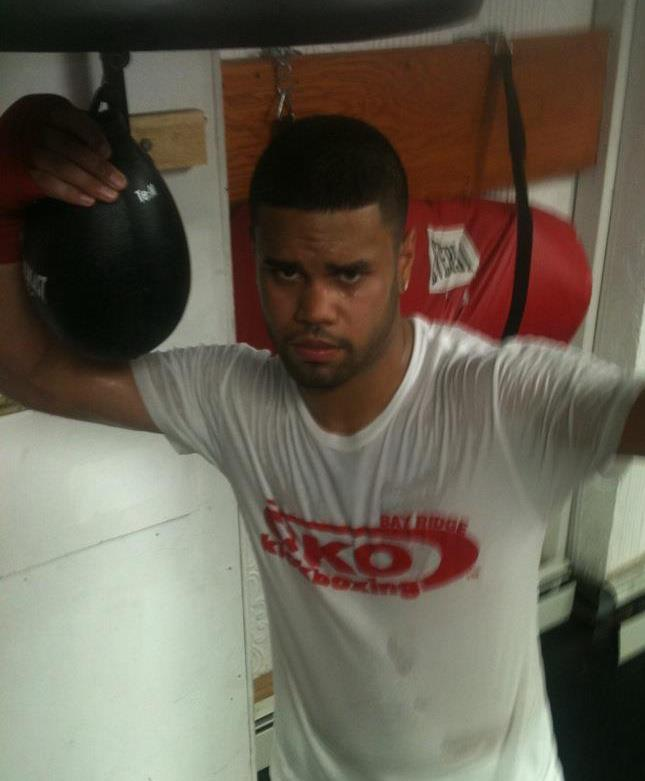

Personal information
- Nickname: The Chosen One/ Shem
- Nationality: (United States) American
- Born: Shemuel Israel Pagan; April 23, 1988 (age 38) Brooklyn, New York, U.S.
- Height: 5 ft 7 in (170 cm)
- Weight: Lightweight

Boxing career
- Stance: Southpaw

Boxing record
- Total fights: 8
- Wins: 8
- Win by KO: 4
- Losses: 0
- Draws: 0

Shemuel Pagan (born April 23, 1988) is an American professional boxer in the lightweight division. He is trained by his father, Robert Pagan. He is currently training at Sadam Ali's gym in Bay Ridge, Brooklyn. Shemuel Pagan is a Puerto Rican American of strict Jewish faith.

At the age of 16, he once gave Zab Judah, former welterweight champion, a black eye in sparring. He did the same to Elio Rojas, a featherweight titlist who made it known he was taking Shemuel lightly in workouts.

== Amateur record ==
He holds an 89-19 career amateur record.

Accomplishments in amateur boxing, titles won by Years

- 2002 & 2003 Ringside National Champion @ KC, MO;
- 2003 Junior Golden Gloves Finalist @ Syracuse, N.Y.;
- 2003 National Boys summer Classic Champion@ Augusta, GA;
- 2003 Junior Olympics N.Y. Metropolitan Champion;
- 2003 N.Y. State Silver Gloves Champion @ Rochester, N.Y. & Silver Gloves Northeast Regional Champion @ Oneonta, N.Y.;
- 2004 Junior Olympics N.Y. State Champion & Northeast Regional finalist @ Lake Placid, N.Y.;
- 2004 Games of Texas Champion;
- 2004 & 2005 Ringside World Champion @ KC, MO.;
- 2005, 2006, 2007, 2008, New York Metropolitan Champion @ N.Y.C.;
- 2005 Under 19 National Champion @ Colorado Springs, CO.;
- 2005 International Bronze Medalist @ Tamere, Finland,
- 2006 Under 19National Finalist Silver Medalist @ KC, MO.;
- 2006 U.S. Northeast Regional Champion @ Utica, N.Y.;
- 2007 U.S. National Championships 3rdplace Bronze Medalist @ Colorado Springs, CO;
- 2007 International Tournament Cheo Aponte 3rd place Bronze Medalist @Caguas, Puerto Rico;
- 2007 Title National Champion @ Memphis, Tenn;
- 2007 Al Brown Invitational Champion @ Atlanta, GA;
- 2007 National P.A.L. Champion & *Outstanding Male Boxer open division winner* @Oxnard, CA.
- 2007 Long Island Amateur Boxing Champion;
- 2007 U.S. Olympic Team Trials 3rd place Bronze Medalist @ Houston, Texas, *Chosen as an alternate @ 125 lbs and allowed to train with 2008 Olympic team;
- 2008 U.S. Northeast Regional Champion @ Lake Placid, N.Y.;
- 2008 U.S. National Championships 3rd place Bronze Medalist @Colorado Springs, CO;
- 2008 International Tournament Cheo Aponte 2ndplace Silver Medalist @ Caguas, Puerto Rico;
- 2008 National P.A.L. Championships 3rd place Bronze Medalist @ Oxnard, CA;
- 2006, 2007, 2008 Empire State Games Champion @ Rochester, N.Y. & Westchester County.
- 2009 National Golden Gloves 2nd place Silver Medalist @ Salt Lake City, Utah.
- 2009 Platinum Gloves Champion.
- 2005, 2006, 2008. 2009 2010 New York Daily News Golden Gloves Champion.

== Professional career ==
On August 21, 2010, Shemuel made his professional debut as a lightweight at the Prudential Center in Newark, New Jersey. The bout took place on the undercard of Tomasz Adamek versus Michael Grant.

== Professional boxing record ==
2 Wins (1 knockout, 1 decision), 0 Losses, 0 Draws, 0 No Contests
Result	Record	Opponent	Type	Round	Date	Location	Notes
Win	2–0	Marcos Garcia	TKO	1 (4), 1:33	2011-03-05	Prudential Center, Newark, New Jersey, United States	
Win	1–0	Raul Rivera	UD	4 (4)	2010-08-21	Prudential Center, Newark, New Jersey, United States	
