= Jae-sung =

- Hangul: 재성
- RR: Jaeseong
- MR: Chaesŏng

Jae-sung, also spelled Jae-seong, is a Korean given name.

People with this name include:

== Entertainers ==
- Choi Jae-sung (born 1964), South Korean actor

== Footballers ==
- Kim Jae-sung (born 1983), South Korean football player
- Ko Jae-sung (born 1985), South Korean football player
- Lee Jae-sung (footballer, born 1988), South Korean football player
- Lee Jae-sung (footballer, born 1992), South Korean football player

== Other sportspeople ==
- Yu Jae-seong (born 1960), South Korean long-distance runner
- Jang Jae-sung (born 1975), South Korean freestyle wrestler
- An Jae-sung (born 1985), South Korean tennis player
- Lee Jae-sung (boxer) (born 1983), South Korean professional boxer
- Jung Jae-sung (1982–2018), South Korean badminton player
- Oh Jae-seong (born 1992), South Korean volleyball player

== See also ==
- List of Korean given names
