= Roberto García (Mexican boxer) =

Mexican boxer (born 1980)

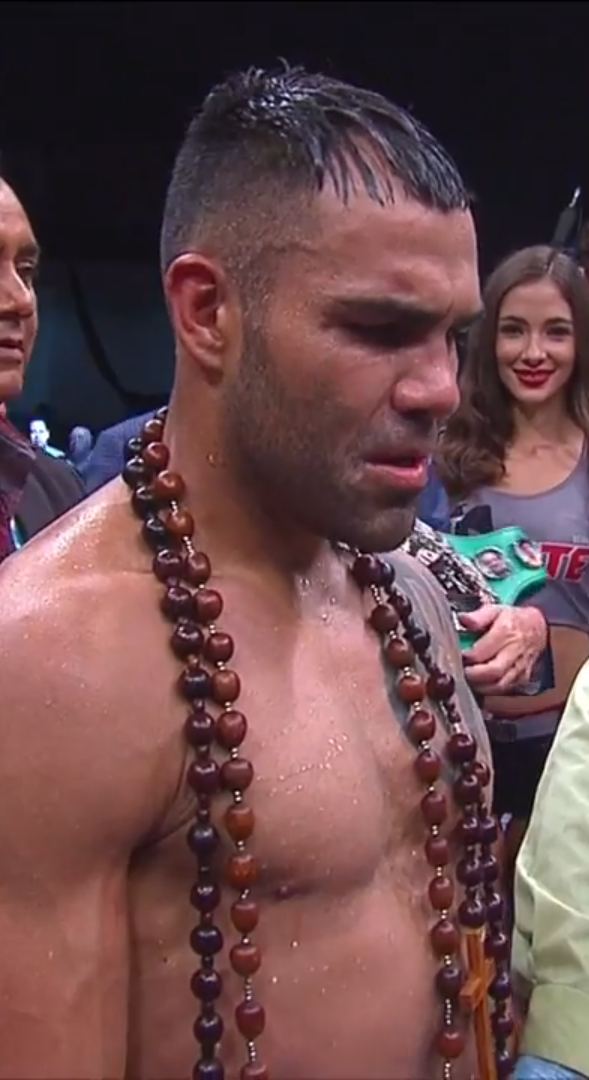

Personal information
- Nickname: La Amenaza
- Born: March 26, 1980 (age 46) Reynosa, Tamaulipas, Mexico
- Height: 5 ft 10 in (181 cm)
- Weight: Light Middleweight; Welterweight

Boxing career
- Reach: 74 in (189 cm)
- Stance: Orthodox

Boxing record
- Total fights: 50
- Wins: 46
- Win by KO: 29
- Losses: 5
- Draws: 0
- No contests: 1

Roberto García (born March 26, 1980) is a Mexican professional boxer.

== Early life ==
García moved to Houston, Texas at an early age. It was in Houston that García began to box. His father turned his home into a gym where he trained, and he began boxing at the age of 16. In his junior year in high school he was challenged by a local Boys and Girls Club Champion at school. "My very first sparring session ended really quick. It was over in the beginning round. Right when I punched him on the nose he quit, I'm it pretty sure it was broken", García was quoted as saying. The local boxing coach spoke to him after the sparring session and convinced him to begin boxing.

During the next three years, García won three consecutive Rio Grande Valley Golden Gloves Championships. He set his sights on the pro ranks. He left home to train in Reynosa, Mexico. García, after a few amateur bouts he knew he would want to turn pro.

== Amateur career ==
On his first Tamamulipas Regional Championship Tournament, García won the first 2 bouts by knockout. In the finals he met last years champion, in what was considered as the fight of the Tamamulipas Regional Championship. García won in a close decision, ending his amateur career with a record of 23 wins and 3 loss (17 KOs).

== Pro career ==
García drew attention in boxing by winning 8 fights, 7 by KO in his first year as a pro. Signing a professional contract he began fighting on more exciting undercards, several televised by Telefutura and NBC. "Fighting on the cards of boxing stars makes me work harder", García said, "because I want to be where they are. I want to be a World Champion!"

Suffering a loss in April 2003 to Calvin Odem, García parted ways with his trainer and found Nelson Fernandez, manager of former WBA Welterweight Champion Andrew Lewis.

=== Latin Fury 14 ===
García worked with Freddie Roach and Eric Brown in preparation for his fight on the Latin Fury card which was highlighted by Garcia taking on three-time world welterweight champion Antonio Margarito from Aguascalientes, Mexico. On May 8, 2010, García lost a bout with America's Antonio Margarito at La Feria de San Marcos, Aguascalientes, Mexico. Jorge Solis and Jose Benavidez were also featured on the card.

=== Premier Boxing Champions ===
García was set to appear in the first Premier Boxing Champions on NBC against Errol Spence Jr. on June 20, 2015. Garcia completely failed to make weight and the fight was called off. Garcia was said to have been ordering tacos and cheeseburgers from room service the week of the fight. The fight was to take place at MGM Grand Casino in Las Vegas, Nevada. García backed out of the fight three days before the card due to weight issues. He was replaced by Phil LoGreco.

== Professional boxing record ==
Result	Rec.	Opponent	Type	Rd, Time	Date	Location	Notes
Win	46-5	(Dominican Republic) Edward Ulloa Diaz	TKO	8 (10)	2022-12-03	(United States) Hynes Event Center, Mercedes, Texas	Won vacant IBA Intercontinental middleweight title
Win	45-5	(Mexico) Jesus Angulo Leija	KO	1 (6)	2022-09-03	(United States) Amigoland Convention Center, Brownsville, Texas	
Win	44-5	(Mexico) Juan Carlos Rojas Sanchez	KO	3 (6)	2021-03-27	(Mexico) Colonia Uniones, Matamoros	
Win	43-5	(Mexico) Erik Mireles Velazquez	KO	2 (8)	2020-12-12	(Mexico) Gimnasio Aguirre, Reynosa	
Loss	42-5	(United Kingdom) Liam Smith	UD	10	2019-12-20	(United States) Talking Stick Resort Arena, Phoenix, Arizona	
Win	42-4	(Mexico) Juan Jose Francisco Marquez Solano	KO	6	2018-08-16	(Mexico) Liga Municipal De Baseball, Matamoros	
Loss	41-4	(United Kingdom) Martin Murray	UD	12	2018-06-23	(United Kingdom) O2 Arena, Greenwich	Lost WBC Silver middleweight title.
Win	41-3	(Mexico) Omar Chavez	UD	10	2017-08-12	(Mexico) Gimnasio Nuevo León Unido, Monterrey	Won vacant WBC Silver middleweight title.
Win	40-3	(Mexico) Nestor Fernando Garcia	UD	8	2017-05-13	(Mexico) Arena Oasis, Cancun	
Win	39-3	(Mexico) Ulises Jimenez	KO	4 (8)	2016-09-24	(United States) Boggus Ford Center, Pharr, Texas	
Win	38-3	(Nicaragua) Santos Benavides	UD	6	2016-04-23	(United States) Events Center, Pharr	
Win	37-3	(United States) James Stevenson	UD	8	2015-04-24	(United States) UIC Pavilion, Chicago, Illinois	
Win	36-3	(Colombia) Breidis Prescott	UD	10	2014-07-25	(United States) UIC Pavilion, Chicago, Illinois	
Win	35-3	(Dominican Republic) Victor Cayo	TKO	6 (10)	2014-05-01	(United States) Hialeah Park Race Track, Hialeah, Florida	
Win	34-3	(Mexico) Norberto Gonzalez	SD	10	2014-02-07	(United States) UIC Pavilion, Chicago, Illinois	
Win	33-3	(United States) Larry Smith	UD	6	2013-11-02	(United States) State Farm Arena, Hidalgo, Texas	
Win	32-3	(Mexico) Miguel Angel Munguia	KO	2 (2:34)	2013-08-16	(United States) Casa de Amistad, Harlingen, Texas, USA	
Win	31-3	(United States) Antwone Smith	UD	10	2012-03-23	(United States) Convention Center, Pharr, Texas, US	
Win	30-3	(United States) Calvin Odom	UD	8	2011-05-06	(United States) Quiet Cannon, Montebello, California, US	
Win	29-3	(Mexico) Jose Flores	UD	8	2011-03-25	(United States) Commerce Casino, Commerce, California, US	
Loss	28-3	(United States) Antonio Margarito	UD	10	2010-05-8	La Feria de San Marcos, Aguascalientes, Aguascalientes, Mexico	vacant WBC International might middleweight title
Win	28-2	(Puerto Rico) Jose Medina	TKO	3(2:58)	2010-03-05	Casa de Amistad, Harlingen, Texas, United States	
Win	27-2	(Nicaragua) Santiago Icabalceta	TKO	2(12)	2009-09-19	Geko Plaza Real Cariari, Desamparados, Costa Rica	
Win	26-2	(Nicaragua) Wilmer Hernandez	RTD	7(:10)	2009-05-16	Gecko Tower, Mall Real Cariari, Costa Rica	
Win	25-2	(Costa Rica) Humberto Aranda	TKO	10	2008-12-05	Gimnasio de la Villa Olímpica, Desamparados, Costa Rica	
N/C|	24-2 (1)	(Mexico) Freddy Hernandez	N/C	3 (12)	2007-11-30	Jacob Brown Auditorium, Brownsville, Texas, United States	Vacant IBA welterweight title
Win	24-2	(United States) Vance Garvey	UD	8	2007-09-08	Edinburg Baseball Stadium, Edinburg, Texas, United States	
Win	23-2	(United States) Carson Jones	UD	10	2007-06-08	Livestock Showground, Mercedes, Texas, United States	
Win	22-2	(United States) Mikel Williams	KO	3(2:04)	2006-12-09	Greg's Ballroom, Mission, Texas, United States	
Win	21-2	(United States) Homer Gibbins	TKO	3(2:04)	2006-09-30	Edinburg Baseball Stadium, Edinburg, Texas, United States	
Win	20-2	(Mexico) Juan Carlos Rubio	UD	12	2006-03-10	La Villa Real Convention Center, McAllen, Texas, United States	Continental Americas IBA Intercontinental welterweight title
Win	19-2	(United States) Enrico Lane	TKO	6(1:45)	2005-11-18	Dodge Arena, Hidalgo, Texas, United States	
Win	18-2	(Puerto Rico) Jose Medina	TKO	3(2:59)	2005-08-25	La Villa Real Convention Center, McAllen, Texas, United States	Interim WBC CABOFE welterweight title
Win	17-2	(United States) Ramon Gomez	KO	1(1:53)	2005-02-26	Dodge Arena, Hidalgo, Texas, United States	USA Texas State welterweight title
Win	16-2	(United States) Chance Leggett	TKO	5(0:10)	2004-12-17	Dodge Arena, Hidalgo, Texas, United States	Miller Light Texas State light middleweight title
Loss	15-2	(Canada) Ian MacKillop	SD	8	2004-04-24	Reliant Park, Houston, Texas, United States	
Win	15-1	(Mexico) Walter Herrera	TKO	1(1:56)	2004-02-19	Dodge Arena, Hidalgo, Texas, United States	
Win	14-1	(United States) Darien Ford	TKO	4(2:05)	2003-12-12	Rio Grande Valley Speedway, McAllen, Texas, United States	
Loss	13-1	(United States) Calvin Odom	UD	8	2003-04-29	La Villa Real Convention Center, McAllen, Texas, United States	
Win	13-0	(United States) Abel Hernandez	KO	2(1:55)	2003-01-30	La Villa Real Convention Center, McAllen, Texas, United States	
Win	12-0	(United States) Danny Reyes	KO	1(1:02)	2002-11-21	La Villa Real Convention Center, McAllen, Texas, United States	
Win	11-0	(United States) Damone Wright	UD	4	2002-10-19	Reliant Park, Houston, Texas, United States	
Win	10-0	(United States) Edson Madrid	UD	6	2002-07-12	La Villa Real Convention Center, McAllen, Texas, United States	
Win	9-0	(United States) Anthony Wilson	UD	6	2002-04-19	Edinburg Baseball Stadium, Edinburg, Texas, United States	
Win	8-0	(Mexico) Jesus Pena	TKO	3(0:10)	2001-12-07	La Villa Real Convention Center, McAllen, Texas, United States	
Win	7-0	(Mexico) Eloy Suarez	TKO	4(0:10)	2001-10-25	La Villa Real Convention Center, McAllen, Texas, United States	
Win	6-0	(Mexico) Leonel Ramos	TKO	2	2001-06-29	Mexico	
Win	5-0	(Mexico) Evaristo Rivera	TKO	2	2001-06-01	Mexico	
Win	4-0	(Mexico) Jesus Pena	KO	2	2001-04-27	Reynosa, Tamaulipas, Mexico	
Win	3-0	(Mexico) Ruben Garcia	UD	4	2001-04-12	Jacob Brown Auditorium, Brownsville, Texas, United States	
Win	2-0	(Mexico) Armando Lopez	KO	2	2001-02-23	Diaz Ordaz, Baja California Sur, Mexico	
Win	1-0	(Mexico) Norberto Flores	KO	1	2001-01-26	Mexico	
