= Rafael Guzmán =

Mexican boxer (1986–2011)

Personal information
- Nickname: Chocho
- Born: Rafael Guzmán Hernández; 9 April 1986 Guadalajara, Jalisco, Mexico
- Died: 18 October 2011 (aged 25)
- Height: 1.80 m (5 ft 11 in)
- Weight: Lightweight; Super featherweight Featherweight

Boxing career
- Reach: 184 cm (72 in)
- Stance: Orthodox

Boxing record
- Total fights: 32
- Wins: 28
- Win by KO: 20
- Losses: 3
- Draws: 1
- No contests: 0

Rafael Guzmán Hernández (9 April 1986 – 18 October 2011) was a Mexican professional boxer. Guzmán is the former WBC FECARBOX Super Featherweight, WBC Mundo Hispano, and WBC FECARBOX Lightweight Champion.

== Early life ==
Guzmán started his amateur boxing career at age ten. He's the son of a former professional boxer and was trained by his father throughout his boxing career.

== Professional career ==
Guzmán knocked out Ernesto González to win the WBC FECARBOX lightweight title and then he won the WBC Mundo Hispano lightweight title by stopping the veteran Jorge Martínez.

On 24 January 2009 Guzmán upset contender Isaac Bejarano to win the WBC FECARBOX super featherweight title. He won his third title in front of his hometown at the Coliseo Olimpico de la UG in Guadalajara, Jalisco, Mexico.

In June 2011, Guzmán lost to an undefeated Mikey Garcia on HBO's undercard of Sebastian Zbik vs. Julio César Chávez Jr.

== Death ==
On 18 October 2011 Guzmán was shot eight times before dying in his hometown of Guadalajara, Jalisco. Reports are that he attempted to escape after the initial shots but was unable to advance more than 100 meters.

In a case of mistaken identity, Rafael had survived a previous attack when on his way to see the birth of his fourth child his vehicle was shot eleven times. With one bullet going through him and another staying lodged in his forearm through the remainder of his boxing career.
