= Anthony Napunyi =

Kenyan boxer

Anthony Napunyi (born October 3, 1982) is a Kenyan professional boxer in the Featherweight division.

== Pro career ==
On August 30, 2008, Napunyi beat the undefeated Hamis Ajali at the Charter Hall in Nairobi, Kenya.

In May 2009, Anthony lost to an undefeated Mikey Garcia, the bout was televised on TV Azteca.
