= Léo Santa Cruz vs. Carl Frampton =

Boxing match

Battle of the Champions
- Date: 30 July 2016
- Venue: Barclays Center, New York City, New York, U.S.
- Title(s) on the line: WBA (Super) featherweight title

Tale of the tape
Boxer	Léo Santa Cruz	Carl Frampton
Nickname	"El Terremoto"	"The Jackal"
Hometown	Huetamo, Michoacán, Mexico	Belfast, Northern Ireland, UK
Purse	$1,000,000	$500,000
Pre-fight record	32–0–1 (18 KO)	22–0 (14 KO)
Age	27 years, 11 months	29 years, 5 months
Height	5 ft 7 1/2 in (171 cm)	5 ft 5 in (165 cm)
Weight	125 1/2 lb (57 kg)	125 1/4 lb (57 kg)
Style	Orthodox	Orthodox
Recognition	WBA (Super); Featherweight Champion; The Ring; No. 2 Ranked Featherweight; TBRB; No. 4 Ranked Featherweight; 3-division world champion	WBA; No. 2 Ranked Featherweight; The Ring/TBRB; No. 2 Ranked Super Bantamweight; Former unified super bantamweight champion

Result
- Frampton defeats Santa Cruz by majority decision

Léo Santa Cruz vs. Carl Frampton, billed as Battle of the Champions, was a professional boxing match contested on 30 July 2016, for the WBA featherweight championship.

== Background ==
On 22 April 2016 negotiations were complete for Santa Cruz to make the second defence of his WBA featherweight title against IBF super bantamweight champion Carl Frampton on 30 July at the Barclays Center in Brooklyn, New York U.S. Frampton's manager Barry McGuigan had held the same title between June 1985 and June 1986.

Frampton had unified the super bantamweight division in February against Scott Quigg, however after WBA ordered him to face "champion in recess" Guillermo Rigondeaux, he was stripped just before the Santa Cruz was signed.

Speaking in build up to the bout Frampton told BBC Radio 5 Live that "people will be in for a shock" and that he was ready to pull off the upset "The Mexican fans are getting worried now it is getting closer. I feel good. It does not feel like I am the away fighter. I am expecting it to be noisy on the night. You will see the best performance yet from me. I am full of energy. I will refuel and then come back a bigger man than Santa Cruz on the night. I will be stronger than him and will do the business." In the pre fight press conference Santa Cruz told reporters "I know that this is going to be an interesting fight. We’re both undefeated and we’re going to make it a war. Neither of us wants that first loss. We’re going to leave it all in the ring. This won’t be an easy fight. It’s a 50-50 fight. The fighter who wants it the most will win the night. I want boxing fans from every background – Latino people from everywhere – Mexicans, Dominicans, Puerto Ricans – to come out and support me and come watch a great fight on Saturday night."

Santa Cruz was a 1 to 2 favourite while Frampton was a 12/5 underdog.

== The fights ==
=== Undercard ===
The preliminary card featured WBO Featherweight champion Amanda Serrano make quick work of the challenger Calixta Silgado. Serrano swarmed Silgado with combinations and hooks, scoring two knockdowns and forcing referee Benjy Esteves to stop the bout in the 1st round.

The first two bouts of the main card saw victories for Tevin Farmer and former 2 division world champion Paulie Malignaggi. This was followed by Tony Harrison stopping Sergey Rabchenko in a IBF light middleweight semi final eliminator.

=== Garcia vs. Rojas ===
The chief support saw former 2 division world champion Mikey Garcia return from an enforced two and half year absence from the ring to face former WBC featherweight titleholder Elio Rojas, who himself was coming off a 23-month layoff. This would be a one-fight deal with promoter Lou DiBella and Showtime.

==== The fight ====
Garcia scored four knockdowns, before finishing Rojas in the 5th round via knockout. Garcia hit Rojas face-first with a left hand and dropping him with a right uppercut-left hook combination. Rojas beat the count, but referee Claudio waved it off.

CompuBox stats showed that Garcia landed 53 of 162 punches thrown (42%) and Rojas landed 47 of 168 thrown (28%).

==== Aftermath ====
After the fight, Garcia said, "I think it was a very good performance. Even though I've been out for two-and-a-half years, people haven't forgotten about me. I did miss [boxing], but the time off helped me regain that fire."

Preceded by vs. Juan Carlos Burgos	Mikey Garcia's bouts 30 July 2016	Succeeded by vs. Dejan Zlatičanin
Preceded by vs. Robert Osiobe	Elio Rojas's bouts 30 July 2016	Retired

=== Main Event ===
The crowd of 9,062 witnessed what was described as potential fight of the year candidate. From the opening bell a pattern developed with Santa Cruz moving forward in an attempt to walk down the challenger, while Frampton used head movement and footwork to score with counters and make the champion miss. Santa Cruz was the more aggressive fighter throughout, but Frampton won many of the early rounds by being the more accurate puncher and the slicker defensively, often making the champion seem flat-footed. Santa Cruz would come on strong late on as Frampton appeared to slightly slow down, however it wasn't enough to overcome Frampton's strong start. The fight went the full 12 rounds, one judge scored it a 114–114 draw but the other two had it 116–112 and 117–111 both in favour of Frampton giving him a majority decision victory.

The victory made Frampton the first Northern Irish boxer to win world titles to two different divisions.

According to CompuBox stats, Frampton landed 242 of 668 punches (36.2%), whilst Santa Cruz connected on 255 of 1,002 blows (25.4%).

== Aftermath ==
Speaking after the bout Frampton said "It's a dream come true, I had the dream of winning a world title and I won it, but I never thought I'd win in two divisions. It was a tough fight. I wanted it to be a tough fight because I wanted a fight the people could remember. I respect [Santa Cruz] a lot. He was a true warrior." He also praised his trainer Shane McGuigan saying "I had a good game plan. Shane was an unbelievable coach. He told me every time I came back into the corner that we could win this a lot easier. But I won it with my heart, not with my head, and I got my hand raised." Later he said that he wanted to defend the title in his home city and did not want to rule out a rematch saying "I want big, memorable fights. I would love to take this man to Belfast for a rematch and show the people there what a great fighter he is."

For his part Santa Cruz "It's hard to get your first loss, but now we'll go back to the gym, we'll get the rematch and we'll win, and that loss will mean nothing. I want to have a rematch in Los Angeles, but I'll go to Belfast, too. He has a difficult style, but we know his style and can get him in the rematch. The crowd was cheering, and I think the judges saw that and maybe, without that, we would have had a draw or maybe a decision."

In addition to a rematch with Santa Cruz, Frampton linked to either WBC champion Gary Russell Jr. or IBF champion Lee Selby.

The fight averaged 480,000 and peaked at 549,000 viewers.

For his performances against both Santa Cruz and Quigg, Frampton beat Terence Crawford, Román González, Vasiliy Lomachenko and Manny Pacquiao to be named as The Ring magazine Fighter of the Year.

== Undercard ==
Confirmed bouts:

Winner	Loser	Weight division/title belt(s) disputed	Result
(United States) Mikey Garcia	(Dominican Republic) Elio Rojas	Light Welterweight (10 rounds)	5th round TKO
(United States) Tony Harrison	(Belarus) Sergey Rabchenko	IBF Light Middleweight eliminator	9th round TKO
(United States) Paulie Malignaggi	(Puerto Rico) Gabriel Bracero	Welterweight (10 rounds)	Unanimous decision
(United States) Tevin Farmer	(Ukraine) Ivan Redkach	Lightweight (10 rounds)	Unanimous decision
Preliminary bouts
(Puerto Rico) Amanda Serrano	(Colombia) Calista Silgado	WBO Featherweight world title	1st round TKO
(United Kingdom) Conrad Cummings	(United States) Dante Moore	Super middleweight (6 rounds)	Unanimous decision
(United Kingdom) Josh Taylor	(United States) Evincii Dixon	Welterweight (8 rounds)	2nd round RTD
(South Korea) Min Wook Kim	(United States) Louis Cruz	Light Welterweight (8 rounds)	1st round TKO
(United States) Jose Gomez	(United States) Josh Crespo	Featherweight (6 rounds)	1st round TKO

== Broadcasting ==
Country	Broadcaster
Latin America	Canal Space
United Kingdom	BoxNation (Live) / BBC Northern Ireland (Delayed)
United States	Showtime

Preceded by vs. Kiko Martínez	Léo Santa Cruz's bouts 30 July 2016	Succeeded by Rematch
Preceded by vs. Scott Quigg	Carl Frampton's bouts 30 July 2016	Succeeded by Rematch
