= Mikey Garcia =

American boxer (born 1987)

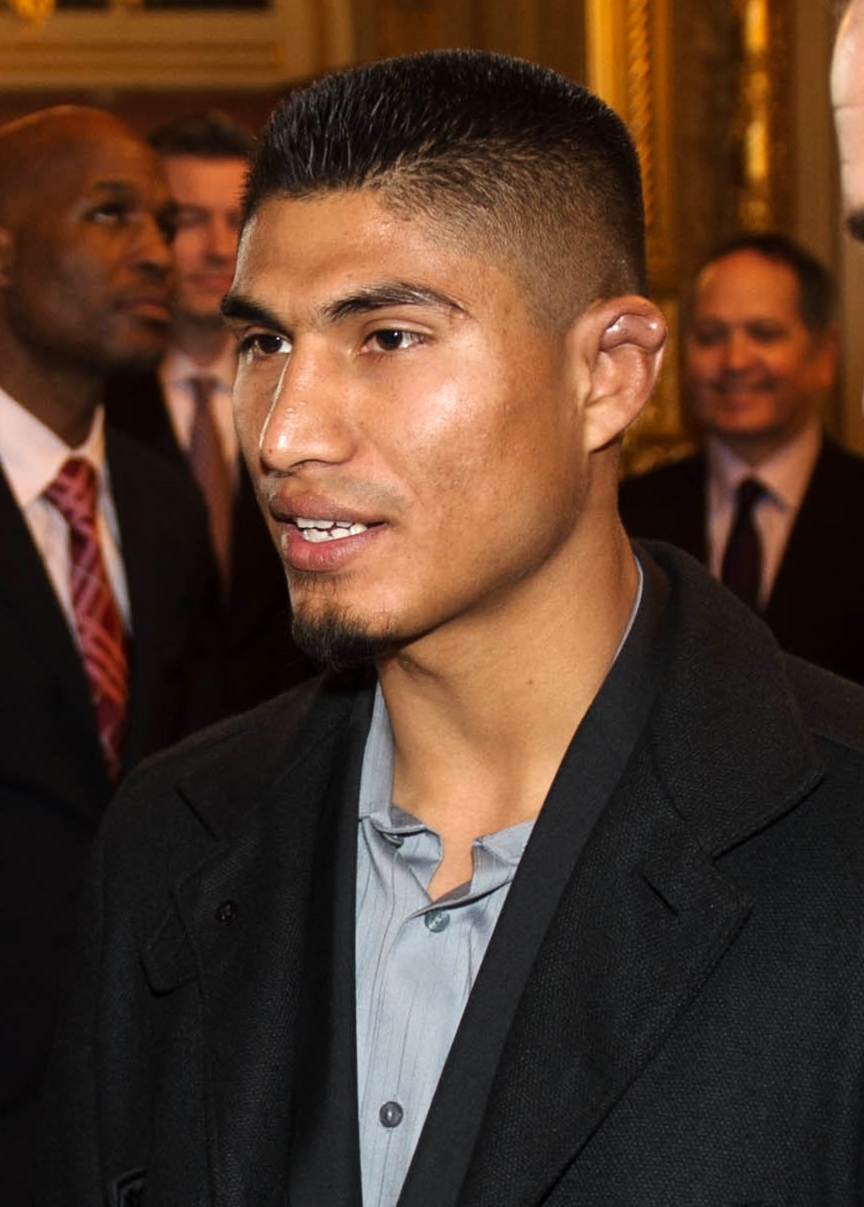
- Garcia at the United States Capitol, 2014

Personal information
- Born: Miguel Angel Garcia Cortez; December 15, 1987 (age 38) Oxnard, California, U.S.
- Height: 5 ft 7 in (170 cm)
- Weight: Featherweight; Super featherweight; Lightweight; Light welterweight; Welterweight

Boxing career
- Reach: 68 in (173 cm)
- Stance: Orthodox

Boxing record
- Total fights: 42
- Wins: 40
- Win by KO: 30
- Losses: 2

Miguel Angel Garcia Cortez (born December 15, 1987), best known as Mikey Garcia, is an American former professional boxer who competed from 2006 to 2021. He held multiple world championships in four weight classes from featherweight to light welterweight, and challenged once for the IBF welterweight title.

== Early life and education ==
Born to Mexican parents, Miguel Angel's father, Eduardo, was an amateur boxer and trainer of world champion boxer Fernando Vargas at La Colonia Youth Boxing Club. His older brother, Roberto was a professional boxer and a former IBF Super Featherweight Champion who lost his belt to the late Diego Corrales. His oldest brother, Daniel, was a boxer and trainer. He has been featured on ABC's show American Latino TV and he talked about balancing studies with the demands of boxing.

Garcia has said he grew up in a "gang-related neighborhood" in Oxnard, California. Garcia said that his parents were both strawberry pickers.

== Amateur career ==
Garcia started his amateur career at the age of fourteen. In 2003, he won a silver medal at the National Junior Olympic Championships in the 125 lb division. In 2004, he won a gold medal at the National Junior Golden Gloves Championships and a silver medal at the National Police Athletic League Championships, both in the 132 lb division. In 2005, he won a bronze medal at the National Golden Gloves Championships and a gold medal at the National Police Athletic League Championships, both in the 132 lb division.

=== Amateur highlights ===
- 2003 National Junior Olympic Championships (Silver Medal, 125 lbs)
- 2004 National Junior Golden Gloves Championships (Gold Medal, 132 lbs)
- 2004 National Police Athletic League Championships (Silver Medal, 132 lbs)
- 2005 National Golden Gloves Championships (Bronze Medal, 132 lbs)
- 2005 National Police Athletic League Championships (Gold Medal, 132 lbs)

== Professional career ==
=== Featherweight ===
==== Early career ====
Garcia is known as a patient fighter with good punching power, a natural right-hander who likes to switch to southpaw during some of his fights. He turned pro in 2006 and signed with Bob Arum's Top Rank. Garcia was undefeated in his first 20 professional fights with 17 of them coming by way of knockout.

In April 2010, Mikey Garcia beat the veteran Tomas Villa by T.K.O. in the first round, to win the USBA Featherweight Championship. He then beat Matt Remillard to win the WBO NABO Featherweight Championship. This would not only be the last boxing bout but also the last event Nick Charles would broadcast, Charles would die a few days later from cancer.

In his next fight HBO asked Garcia to turn down a world title shot against Billy Dib to fight on the undercard of Sebastian Zbik vs. Julio César Chávez Jr. After his win over Rafaël Guzmán, Garcia sent his well wishes to Genaro Hernández who was struggling with cancer, Hernández would die a few days later. Months later he beat Juan Carlos Martinez in under four rounds at the Madison Square Garden in New York City.

==== Garcia vs. Salido ====
Garcia's first major step up in competition came on January 19, 2013 against WBO Featherweight champion and Ring No. 1 ranked featherweight, Orlando Salido. His fight with Salido was originally supposed to happen on November 10, 2012 at Wynn Las Vegas but Salido broke his finger and had to pull out of the fight with Garcia fighting Jonathan Victor Barros as a late replacement. Garcia would get his chance again In front of a near sell out crowd of 4,850 at The Theater at Madison Square Garden in New York City, Garcia dominated the bout from the very beginning, keeping Salido at range with the jab. Garcia knocked Salido down four times early on in the fight, building up a large lead on the scorecards. During the 8th round, Salido accidentally clashed heads with Garcia, causing Garcia's nose to break. The fight was stopped between rounds, with the decision going to the scorecards. Garcia won with the scores of 79–70, 79–69, 79–69 to win his first world title. Speaking of the headbutt, Garcia said, "I had the perfect fight going on. I was beating him up good, and then he drove his head into my face -- but it was accidental." Garcia earned a career-high $220,000 purse for the fight.

==== Garcia vs. López ====
Garcia was scheduled to make his first title defense against Juan Manuel López in Dallas on June 15, 2013. Garcia failed to make 126 lb weight limit coming in two pounds overweight. He was stripped of the title. The fight went ahead after Garcia paid Lopez a penalty of $150,000 for missing weight. Garcia claimed the reason for not making weight was due to missing several days of training. On fight night, Garcia re-hydrated to 142 pounds, whilst Lopez weighed 137.5 pounds on the HBO scales. In front of a crowd of 5,605 at the American Airlines Center in Dallas, Texas, Garcia dominated the fight from the opening bell, dropping Lopez in round 2 following a right straight hand. In round 4, Garcia landed a left hook to Lopez, knocking him down again. At 1 minute and 35 seconds of round 4, referee Raphael Ramos waved the fight off, giving Garcia the win. After the fight, Garcia said, "I was able to land my jab and stand pretty comfortable. When I knocked him down, that gave me confidence that I could put him out early." Garcia landed 53 punches, with 40 of them being jabs.

=== Super featherweight ===
==== Garcia vs. Martínez ====
On August 1, 2013 the WBO ordered their junior lightweight champion Román Martínez (27–1–2, 16 KOs) to make a mandatory defence against Garcia. On September 9, the date of the purse bid, a deal was set for the fight to take place on November 9 at the American Bank Center in Corpus Christi, Texas. The attendance was announced as 5,124. Garcia went down in the second round from a Martínez counter right hand. Garcia, however, recovered and dominated the rest of the fight before knocking out Martínez with a left hook to the body in the eighth round. Speaking off the knockout punch, Garcia said, "I thought it was a very good punch when I landed it. I felt I really hurt him, enough to where he wouldn't get up. I had a feeling it would be over after I connected." Garcia landed nearly half of his total 127 power punches. This included 52 punches landed in the last three rounds compared to 8 landed by Martínez. The victory meant Garcia became a two weight world champion.

==== Garcia vs. Burgos ====
On December 14, 2013 it was announced that Garcia would make his first title defense against mandatory challenger, 25 year old Mexican boxer Juan Carlos Burgos (30–1–2, 20 KOs). The fight was set for January 25, 2014 at the Theater at Madison Square Garden in New York City on a live double-header on HBO Boxing After Dark, with Bryant Jennings vs. Artur Szpilka as co-main event. Burgos was known to have fought to a split draw with former champion Román Martínez on the Garcia-Salido undercard in January 2013. Garcia went into the fight with a 11-fight knockout streak. After being staggered in the second round, Garcia took control of the fight and won close to every round for the remainder of the bout. At the end of the fight, Garcia won via unanimous decision (118–110, 118–110, 119–109), improving to 34–0. Garcia landed 163 of 567 punches thrown (29%) and Burgos landed 89 of his 564 thrown (16%).

In the post fight interview, Garcia admitted he had trouble at the start, "His height gave me difficulty. But I found my range and I found my distance and that was it." Burgos snapped Garcia's knockout streak which stretched back 4 years to 2010 and the fight also marked the first time Garcia saw out the 12 round distance. Garcia called out Yuriorkis Gamboa for a potential fight. The fight averaged 829,000 viewers and peaked at 911,000 viewers.

=== Contract dispute with Top Rank ===
Garcia had been unhappy over his purses, which had been increasing to career-high six-figure levels fight after fight, sued Top Rank in April 2014 to get out of the agreement. Although in arbitration with his promoter, Garcia had expressed plans of returning to the ring under a new contract with Top Rank. On October 15, Garcia vacated his WBO title. He was due to make a mandatory defence against Interim champion Orlando Salido. Garcia also cited difficulty in making the 130 pound limit, the main reason he vacated. On April 8, 2016, it was confirmed that Garcia and Top Rank, who were locked in a dispute over his promotional contract, had reached a settlement, according to Bob Arum. Top Rank vice president Carl Moretti told ESPN.com. "All parties came to a mutual agreement, details of that agreement are a confidential matter. We all move on and do what we do." Although Garcia's Top Rank contract was up in August, they reached a deal.

=== Light welterweight ===
==== Garcia vs. Rojas ====
Top Rank announced on June 28, 2016, after 2 and a half years off, Garcia would be returning to the boxing ring against former world featherweight titleholder Elio Rojas on July 30 on Showtime in a 10-round bout at Barclays Center in Brooklyn on the undercard of Santa-Cruz-Frampton. This would be a one-fight deal with promoter Lou DiBella and Showtime. They met at approximately 138 pounds. The weight had not been contractually hashed out, however Garcia planned to move down with the hopes of challenging for a world title in the 135-pound lightweight division. Garcia scored four knockdowns, before finishing Rojas in the 5th round via knockout. Garcia hit Rojas face-first with a left hand and dropping him with a right uppercut-left hook combination. Rojas, who was only fighting for the second time in four years, beat the count, but referee Claudio waved it off at 2 minutes, 2 seconds. After the fight, Garcia said, "I think it was a very good performance. Even though I've been out for two-and-a-half years, people haven't forgotten about me. I did miss [boxing], but the time off helped me regain that fire." CompuBox stats showed that Garcia landed 53 of 162 punches thrown (42%) and Rojas landed 47 of 168 thrown (28%). Rojas came off a 23-month lay-off. The fight averaged 427,000 viewers.

=== Lightweight ===
==== Garcia vs. Zlatičanin ====
Garcia announced he would be fighting at lightweight to challenge undefeated WBC champion Dejan Zlatičanin (22–0, 15 KOs). Zlatičanin claimed the vacant title by knocking out Franklin Mamani in June and also holds decision victories over the likes of Petr Petrov and former multiple weight world champion Ricky Burns. The fight would take place at the MGM Grand in Las Vegas and again serve as a co-feature to the anticipated rematch between Carl Frampton and Leo Santa Cruz on January 28, 2017.

Garcia stopped Zlatičanin in round three to win the title and give Zlaticanin his first professional defeat. The end came after Garcia hit a two punch combination starting with an uppercut which led Zlatičanin open for a final right hook which dropped him backwards on the floor, a knockout of the year candidate. The referee stopped the fight immediately. Garcia became a three-weight world champion with this knockout win. Garcia's purse for the fight was $375,000 compared to the $320,000 that Zlatičanin received. In the post fight interview, Garcia said that he would like to unify the division and also mentioned fighting undefeated Terence Crawford at light welterweight. Garcia landed 50 punches of 176 thrown (28%), whilst Zlatičanin landed only 16 of 60 (27%). The fight averaged 544,000 and peaked at 617,000 viewers.

=== Return to light welterweight ===
==== Garcia vs. Broner ====
On May 25, 2017 it was announced that talks were underway for a fight between Garcia and four-weight world champion Adrien Broner on July 29, 2017 at Barclays Center in Brooklyn. A deal which would include a catchweight of 140 pounds, the super lightweight limit, with Showtime the likely network to broadcast the fight. On Monday, May 22, Broner was sentenced to 72 hours at the Kenton County Detention Center in Covington, Kentucky, on a contempt charge, after failing to make multiple court appearances. Garcia said he would be returning to lightweight after the fight, adding that the Broner fight was 'too good and too lucrative' to pass up.

If Broner missed weight, he would be fined $500,000. He said he would be more disciplined because he won't give up half a million dollars and claimed he had a reason to not miss weight.

On July 20, 8 days before the official weigh in, Broner reportedly weighed 144 pounds and said that he would 'comfortably make weight tomorrow'. On July 21, the WBC announced that their Diamond light welterweight title would be at stake for the fight. Garcia weighed in a career high 139.5 pounds and more than Broner, who weighed 138.7 pounds.

Garcia won the fight by unanimous decision with the three judges scoring the fight 117–111, 116–112, 116–112. The fight started tentatively, with both boxers landing few punches in the opening round. But over the course of the fight, Garcia took over and by the championship rounds he was significantly outpacing Broner in punches landed and thrown. ESPN scored the fight 120–108 shutout win for Garcia. In the post fight interviews, Garcia praised his performance and Broner, "This is definitely one of my best performances ever. I think I controlled the fight in the early rounds and I kept the activity up. Broner is a great fighter who has great skills. I was the superior fighter tonight." Broner was humble in defeat, but stated that he had to catch Garcia, who he claimed was running, "It was a good fight. At the end of the day, I come to fight, I come to win and I put my heart on the line. It was Tom & Jerry – I had to catch the mouse."

Both fighters earned a $1 million purse for the fight. CompuBox statistics showed that Garcia was the more active boxer, landing 244 of 783 punches (31%), Broner landed only 125 of 400 thrown (31%). Garcia threw over 200 punches in the last four rounds alone, trying to get the stoppage win. Garcia said he was open to any boxer coming over to showtime, whether that be at 135, 140 or even 147 pounds. The fight drew an average 881,000 viewers on Showtime and peaked at 937,000 viewers, making it the most watched fight on Showtime since Deontay Wilder defeated Bermane Stiverne to win the WBC heavyweight title in January 2015. That fight drew an average of 1.24 million.

==== Garcia vs. Lipinets ====
In early September 2017, Garcia took to social media and called out four-weight world champion Miguel Cotto for a fight in December, possibly being Cotto's final fight. Garcia's trainer and brother Roberto explained that it was his friend Rudy Hernandez who first mentioned taking Mikey up to 154 pounds for a one off fight. On September 21, he reiterated his desire to move up to 154 to be Cotto's final foe. Cotto's trainer was also open for the fight to take place.

Robert Garcia said if Mikey is unable to land a fight with Cotto, he could potentially fight Robert Easter Jr. in a unification fight in December. On October 5, the WBC ordered a fight between Garcia and Jorge Linares (43-3, 27 KOs), as Linares holds the WBC Diamond title, in addition to the WBA lightweight title. Garcia commented on Twitter that the Cotto fight couldn't happen as Golden Boy Promotions required him signing an exclusive long-term contract with them in order to make the fight. Garcia also mentioned that the fight with Linares wouldn't happen before the end of the year as Linares was unavailable on December. Lance Pugmire reported for the Los Angeles Times that Garcia would most likely return on December or January against Robert Easter Jr.

Eric Gomez, president of Golden Boy sent out a message to Garcia stating if he wanted the fight with Linares, it could be made, without any add-ons to the contract. Garcia later replied, "No need to put it out [in] public. You also have my number, I'll call you later bro." Gomez later announced that Garcia had rejected their offer for a one-fight agreement with a 50-50 purse split. Garcia said he had received a more lucrative offer. He said, "I have more options, in fact [...] the guaranteed purse is better[...] just as Golden Boy is looking to do what's best for their company, I am also looking to do what's best for me."

On December 14, 2017 RingTV.com announced that Garcia would next challenge recently crowned IBF light welterweight champion Sergey Lipinets (13-0, 10 KOs) on February 10, 2018 on Showtime for a package reportedly worth approximately $3.5 million. According to early reports, the fight was likely to take place at the Alamodome in San Antonio, Texas. WBC president Sulaiman announced that Garcia would keep his lightweight title regardless of the result. On January 17, 2018 it was reported the fight would be postponed due to Lipinets suffering a hand injury whilst in training. Lipinets co-manager, Alex Vaysfeld stated the hand injury occurred in December 2017 and Lipinets had begged him not to postpone the fight. A doctors report suggested he could be out for a month. A few days later, the fight was rescheduled to take place on March 10. The bout would remain in San Antonio, however the Freeman Coliseum was announced as the new venue.

Garcia dropped Lipinets in round 7, en route to becoming a four-weight world champion via unanimous decision after 12 rounds. The final scorecards read 116-111, 117-110 and 117-110 in favor of Garcia. Many of the rounds were close with Garcia doing more to win each round. Lipinets landed the harder punches. Garcia came in to the fight with a gameplan knowing Lipinets was the bigger man, he used different angles behind his jab and remained patient. A left hook to Lipinets's face dropped him for the first time in his professional career. Lipinets managed to get up and finish the round on steady legs. CompuBox Stats showed that Garcia landed 169 of 679 total punches (25%) and Lipinets landed 144 of his 509 thrown (28%). Garcia landed 46% of his power punches; 92 to Lipinets' 73. With the victory, Garcia also became the lineal light welterweight champion and joined Manny Pacquiao and Juan Manuel Marquez as the only fighters in history to win titles at 126, 130, 135 and 140 pounds. The fight averaged 618,000 viewers and peaked at 689,000 viewers on Showtime.

=== Return to lightweight ===
==== Garcia vs. Easter ====
On March 12, 2018, the IBF wrote to Garcia, giving him until March 22 to decide whether he wants to keep his IBF title at light welterweight as they had a mandatory challenger, Ivan Baranchyk (18–0, 11 KOs) lined up next. On April 17, Garcia vacated the IBF title, confirming he would drop back to lightweight to defend his WBC title. On April 24, WBC president Sulaiman stated Garcia would participate in a lightweight unification with IBF beltholder Robert Easter Jr. in the summer. On May 1, it was reported that the fight would likely take place in July or August at the Staples Center in Los Angeles. On May 4, it was reported that Garcia was close to signing a deal with UFC president Dana White's Zuffa Boxing promotions. July 28 was later confirmed as the fight date.

Before a crowd of 12,560, Garcia dropped Easter in round 3 on his way to a unanimous decision win with scores of 116–111, 117–110 and 118–109, to become the unified WBC and IBF lightweight champion. The fight started with Easter using his distance well to keep Garcia at arms reach. In round 3, Garcia knocked Easter down with a left hook to the head. Garcia did not seem to struggle to get close as Easter, who was using his long jab effectively as Garcia himself was also managing to land his jab, despite the reach disadvantage. From round 6, Garcia controlled the fight. It appeared that Easter became wary of Garcia's power and began to fight more cautiously. Both fighters traded in round 9 with Garcia landing hard shots to the body and Easter landing with his left hand. In rounds 10 and 11, Easter took punishment against the ropes. Garcia then finished strong in the final round. CompuBox showed that Garcia outlanded him 95–34 in total punches over the final four rounds. Overall, Garcia landed 176 punches of 555 thrown (32%) and Easter landed 129 of his 507 (25%). Easter landed 89 of 343 jabs, however he had more success in the first half of the fight.

On unifying, Garcia said, "It's a great accomplishment. Now we're back. I told you guys I was coming for bigger things and now we're one step closer to achieving that. I knew he was a tough opponent. He's a tough warrior. He gave a great fight, but I was the better fighter. I was in control of the fight and I did what I had to do to win." Easter was humble in defeat and gave full credit to Garcia, "He was just a better man tonight. I take my hat off to Mikey. He's a true warrior. Whenever we step in the ring, we are both putting our lives on the line, and tonight Mikey was victorious. I just couldn't find the timing and I just couldn't let my right hand go." Garcia also re-iterated his desire to fight IBF welterweight champion Errol Spence Jr. by the end of 2018. Spence, who was sat ringside also admitted the fight was too big to turn down and would not be hard to make. Garcia reportedly earned around a $1 million purse. The fight averaged 680,000 viewers and peaked at 725,000 viewers.

=== Welterweight ===
==== Garcia vs. Spence ====
On July 31, 2018, the IBF ordered Garcia to defend his newly-won title against mandatory challenger Richard Commey (26–2, 23 KOs), with a deal to be reached by August 30. Then-IBF champion Easter was ordered to fight Commey before March 30, 2018 however the IBF granted an exception for the Garcia-Easter unification bout as long as the winner satisfied their mandatory next. On October 19, Commey tweeted that the IBF had ordered the bout to go to purse bids as Garcia had not signed his side of the contract. On October 25, BoxingScene.com reported that negotiations between Garcia and Spence (24–0, 21 KOs) were progressing, with the fight likely to take place in February 2019 on Showtime PPV.

On October 30, 2018, Garcia vacated his IBF lightweight title and the purse bid for the potential Commey fight was cancelled. On November 13, PBC made an official announcement for their 2019 schedule. It was announced the fight between Garcia and Spence would take place at the welterweight limit at the AT&T Stadium in Arlington, Texas on March 16, 2019 exclusively on FOX PPV. Many fans reacted to fight being announced. Some welcomed the fight and praised Garcia for 'daring to be great' and some fans believed the size difference would be too much as Spence is considered a big welterweight.

On the night, Spence completely outclassed and dominated Garcia, using his superior reach to constantly land jabs to the head and body from a distance, landing 108 over the course of the fight. Garcia tried to close the distance, but with Spence's weight and height advantage, he was able to completely dominate Garcia even in the pocket. In rounds 8 and 9, Spence landed over 100 punches in two rounds, with the majority being power shots, constantly using lead hooks and uppercuts on the increasing backing up Garcia. In total, Spence landed 345 punches to Garcia's 75. Garcia was unable to land double-digit punches in any of the twelve rounds. The scorecards on the night read 120-107 and 120–108, twice, to give Spence a perfect 12 round shutout victory. After the fight, Spence was joined in the ring by eight-division world champion Manny Pacquiao. Both stated that they would love to fight each other next.

A crowd of 47,525 attended the event, generating a live gate of $5 million. According to ESPN, FOX's first PPV sold over 360,000 buys, possibly up to 380,000 buys, generating a minimum $27 million domestically. It was considered a success considering PBC's recent PPV's and the fact it was a PPV debut for both boxers. Garcia and Spence had a base purse of $3 million, up to $8 million based on PPV sales.

==== Garcia vs. Vargas ====
After a layoff of almost a year, in December 2019, Garcia signed a one-fight deal to headline a Matchroom Boxing card on DAZN on February 29, 2020 at the Ford Center at the Star in Frisco, Texas, in his second bout at welterweight, against former two-division world champion Jessie Vargas (29-2-2 11 KOs), who was ranked #4 by the WBO at welterweight. The fight was scheduled for 12-rounds. Garcia believed their different styles would make for a good fight. Garcia said the contract he signed was the "right deal and the right agreement". It was well known that Hearn wanted to sign Garcia when he first began to promote fights in the USA. Garcia agreed to sign on a fight-by-fight basis, so he could avoid being tied down into a contract and have more freedom. His purse was reported to be $7 million. Garcia explained he originally wished to return to super lightweight, but wanted a top contender following his professional loss, however there were no boxers available who fitted these criteria, so he instead opted to stay at welterweight. Despite the fight not being contested for a world title, full VADA testing was carried out as both were tested on a regular basis. Two weeks before the fight, the WBC announced their Diamond belt would be awarded to the winner. Garcia weighed 145.8 pounds and Vargas weighed 147 pounds.

In a hard-fought battle, Garcia dropped Vargas in the fifth round and earned a unanimous decision victory, with scores of 114-113, 116-111, and 116-111 to capture the WBC Diamond belt. Garcia began slow, allowing Vargas to out-box him in the opening rounds. The turning point was in round 5 after Garcia landed a right hand, which dropped Vargas. He barely beat the count and was again staggered by another right hand. Vargas did well to avoid further punishment. From the sixth round, Garcia controlled the remainder of the fight. CompuBox punch stats saw Garcia land 151 of 478 (32%) total punches thrown, while Vargas landed 142 punches of 671 (21%) total punches thrown. In his post-fight interview, Garcia stated his intentions to continue fighting in the welterweight division, saying, "I would love to fight against Manny Pacquiao, or a rematch with Errol Spence. I’m better now at this weight class. I want to continue to campaign at 147 [lbs] and seek a title in a fifth division.” Vargas wanted a rematch, citing only the knockdown was the difference, in what he believed was a close fight.

==== Failed negotiations vs. Prograis ====
In July 2021, talks emerged for a fight between Garcia and former world champion Regis Prograis (26-1, 22 KOs), to potentially take place in the fall. Garcia told reporters, the date and venue would depend on when and where Saul Álvarez had his next fight. The main reason was to avoid a clash, and if Texas is available, as it was a preferred state for the fight to take place. Eddie Hearn who had promoted Garcia's last fight, was excited about the possibilities of the match up, as it would also add his DAZN schedule. Neither boxer was aligned with DAZN and Hearn explained that DAZN were no longer over paying for fights, as they had previously done. An example of this was Garcia earning a guaranteed $7 million base purse against Vargas, which was a one-fight deal. The fight never came off. This was down to budget issues and DAZN not wanting to pay over the odds. Prograis was upset, but understood the business side and it making sense. He did not claim Garcia was avoiding him and hoped the fight could take place in the future. It was reported that DAZN would have only paid Garcia and Prograis a combined purse of less than $7 million.

==== Garcia vs. Martin ====
After a layoff of almost twenty months since his last fight, on September 8, 2021 it was announced that Garcia would return to the ring against European super lightweight champion Sandor Martin (38-2, 13 KOs) on October 16 in Fresno, California. The fight was to be contested at a catchweight of 145 pounds. The idea was for Garcia to shake off some ring rust and then move on to fight Regis Prograis in 2022. Martin stated he was here for an upset and would prove to everyone it was a mistake to pick him as an opponent. Martin had a fight scheduled in Barcelona for September 11, but soon pulled out to accept this opportunity. Garcia weighed 143.6 pounds and Martin, who was fighting in the United States for the first time as a professional, weighed 144 pounds. Martin came into the fight with a nine-fight winning streak.

Martin was a 10-1 underdog heading into the bout and was said to be a handpicked opponent by Team Garcia and Matchroom Boxing. Despite being the heavy -2000 pre-fight betting favorite, Garcia suffered his second professional defeat, when he was outboxed to a majority decision loss, with scores of 95–95, and 97–93 twice in favor of Martin. In his post-fight interview, Garcia offered his opinion on the fight: "I thought it was a good fight. He [Martin] fought a very good fight. I thought I did the necessary to close the gap, putting the pressure, looking for the fight. He was the one moving, running around a lot. He countered me a few times, but I was the one actively looking for the fight; I thought I was ahead on the cards." Martin boxed off the backfoot from the start with his best punch being a straight left, which landed many times throughout the fight. Garcia, who intended to gain rounds in the fight and shake off any ring rust, failed to do so as he looked slow. Fans in attendance failed to lift Garcia spirits in the seventh round with "Mikey!" chants and in the tenth round, Martin landed 31 punches. This was the second most landed on Garcia in his career after Spence.

Garcia didn't make any excuses following the loss and despite not having a rematch clause in the contract, both were open to having one. According to Compubox, Garcia was credited with landing 60 of his 318 punches thrown (19%) and Martin out-worked him, landing 75 of his 231 thrown (33%). The event, which took place at Chukchansi Park was attended by 8,000 fans. Garcia's purse for the fight was $1.5 million, with Martin taking home a $150,000 purse. The fight was awarded 2021 BoxingScene.com's 2021 Upset of The Year.

=== Retirement ===
Garcia spoke to ESnews days after the fight. He ensured the loss would not define his career and he would continue fighting. He said, "It's not the end of the world. It's not the end of my career. People might think a loss is such a big deal, and going into depression. No, I'm not. I'm jumping right back in it. I'm not worried about it ... [A loss] is nothing. It's part of boxing. It happens. People take losses in other areas in life. You can't let a loss keep you down. Get the f--- up. Move on. Leave it behind you. Go forward. You can't be dwelling on the past. You get all depressed and sh!t. You have to keep moving forward to what's next. That's how I see it. It's part of the sport. No big deal. It's not the first time I lost. I lost 12 times as an amateur. Who gives a f---? Does anybody talk about that? Who cares? Move on." He also stated the loss was motivation for him, and he hoped to see Martin in a rematch after a few wins. For now, Garcia said he would campaign in the super lightweight division.

In June 2022, Garcia changed his profile on his Instagram account to read “Retired World Champ 126, 130, 135, 140 lbs.”, indicating he had retired. He did not make a post himself, however his older brother and trainer Robert Garcia confirmed the news. He told FightHubTV, “It’s time for him to enjoy his kids, his family, his loved ones. I think he made the right decision. When a fighter doesn’t want it, doesn’t have the hunger, we’re not going to go in there and risk [our lives].” Robert agreed with his decision to hang up his gloves. In July 2022, Garcia himself confirmed his retirement, when he told Boxing Social, “I’m not planning on fighting anymore. We’re done. I had a good career, I’m happy with everything. It’s time to move on.” When asked which fight was the most memorable in his career, he replied, “There have been many, man. “Every fight was special for a reason. I’m happy with everything that I have accomplished with my career and I'm happy to say goodbye as well.” He retired as a former four-division champion, with a record of 40-2, 30 knockouts, at the age of 34.

The media caught up with Garcia in August 2023 to ask how about retirement and if he regretted anything. Garcia responded, "Nope." He was asked due to the number of recently retired boxers, including Floyd Mayweather Jr. and Manny Pacquiao, taking part in exhibition fights.

== Professional boxing record ==
42 fights	40 wins	2 losses
By knockout	30	0
By decision	10	2

No.	Result	Record	Opponent	Type	Round, time	Date	Location	Notes
42	Loss	40–2	Sandor Martin	MD	10	Oct 16, 2021	Chukchansi Park, Fresno, California, U.S.	
41	Win	40–1	Jessie Vargas	UD	12	Feb 29, 2020	Ford Center at The Star, Frisco, Texas, U.S.	
40	Loss	39–1	Errol Spence Jr.	UD	12	Mar 16, 2019	AT&T Stadium, Arlington, Texas, U.S.	For IBF welterweight title
39	Win	39–0	Robert Easter Jr.	UD	12	Jul 28, 2018	Staples Center, Los Angeles, California, U.S.	Retained WBC lightweight title; Won IBF lightweight title
38	Win	38–0	Sergey Lipinets	UD	12	Mar 10, 2018	Freeman Coliseum, San Antonio, Texas, U.S.	Won IBF light welterweight title
37	Win	37–0	Adrien Broner	UD	12	Jul 29, 2017	Barclays Center, New York City, New York, U.S.	
36	Win	36–0	Dejan Zlatičanin	KO	3 (12), 2:21	Jan 28, 2017	MGM Grand Garden Arena, Paradise, Nevada, U.S.	Won WBC lightweight title
35	Win	35–0	Elio Rojas	TKO	5 (10), 2:02	Jul 30, 2016	Barclays Center, New York City, New York, U.S.	
34	Win	34–0	Juan Carlos Burgos	UD	12	Jan 25, 2014	The Theater at Madison Square Garden, New York City, New York, U.S.	Retained WBO junior lightweight title
33	Win	33–0	Román Martínez	KO	8 (12), 0:56	Nov 9, 2013	American Bank Center, Corpus Christi, Texas, U.S.	Won WBO junior lightweight title
32	Win	32–0	Juan Manuel López	TKO	4 (12), 1:34	Jun 15, 2013	American Airlines Center, Dallas, Texas, U.S.	WBO and The Ring featherweight titles at stake only for López after Garcia missed weight
31	Win	31–0	Orlando Salido	TD	9 (12), 0:01	Jan 19, 2013	The Theater at Madison Square Garden, New York City, New York, U.S.	Won WBO and vacant The Ring featherweight titles; Unanimous TD: Garcia's nose broken from an accidental head clash
30	Win	30–0	Jonathan Victor Barros	TKO	8 (10), 2:24	Nov 10, 2012	Wynn Las Vegas, Paradise, Nevada, U.S.	
29	Win	29–0	Mauricio Pastrana	KO	2 (10), 1:05	Sep 1, 2012	Arena TKT Box Tour, Los Mochis, Mexico	
28	Win	28–0	Bernabe Concepcion	TKO	7 (10), 2:33	Mar 10, 2012	Coliseo Roberto Clemente, San Juan, Puerto Rico	Retained WBC–NABF and WBO–NABO featherweight titles
27	Win	27–0	Juan Carlos Martinez	TKO	4 (10), 2:40	Oct 22, 2011	Madison Square Garden, New York City, New York, U.S.	Retained WBC–NABF featherweight title
26	Win	26–0	Rafael Guzmán	KO	4 (12), 1:55	Jun 4, 2011	Staples Center, Los Angeles, California, U.S.	Retained WBC–NABF and WBO–NABO featherweight titles
25	Win	25–0	Matt Remillard	RTD	10 (12), 3:00	Mar 26, 2011	Boardwalk Hall, Atlantic City, New Jersey, U.S.	Won WBC–NABF and WBO–NABO featherweight titles
24	Win	24–0	Olivier Lontchi	KO	5 (10), 1:30	Dec 4, 2010	Honda Center, Anaheim, California, U.S.	
23	Win	23–0	Cornelius Lock	TKO	11 (12), 1:09	Aug 14, 2010	Energy Arena, Laredo, Texas, U.S.	
22	Win	22–0	Pedro Navarrete	UD	8	May 8, 2010	Plaza de Toros Monumental, Aguascalientes City, Mexico	
21	Win	21–0	Tomas Villa	TKO	1 (12), 1:07	Apr 3, 2010	American Bank Center, Corpus Christi, Texas, U.S.	Won vacant IBF–USBA featherweight title
20	Win	20–0	Arturo Gómez	TKO	5 (8), 2:35	Jan 30, 2010	Restaurante Arroyo, Mexico City, Mexico	
19	Win	19–0	Yogli Herrera	KO	3 (8), 2:19	Dec 19, 2009	Beeghly Center, Youngstown, Ohio, U.S.	
18	Win	18–0	Carlos Manuel Rivera	TKO	7 (10), 0:40	Aug 29, 2009	QuikTrip Park, Grand Prairie, Texas, U.S.	
17	Win	17–0	Anthony Napunyi	TKO	3 (10), 1:04	May 16, 2009	Star of the Desert Arena, Primm, Nevada, U.S.	
16	Win	16–0	Lucian Gonzalez	RTD	5 (8), 3:00	Feb 6, 2009	Activity Center, Maywood, California, U.S.	
15	Win	15–0	Walter Estrada	UD	8	Oct 31, 2008	The Joint, Paradise, Nevada, U.S.	
14	Win	14–0	Jose Hernandez	TKO	8 (8), 0:24	Aug 2, 2008	Pearl Concert Theater, Paradise, Nevada, U.S.	
13	Win	13–0	Jae-Sung Lee	TKO	4 (8), 1:14	Jun 26, 2008	The Orleans, Paradise, Nevada, U.S.	
12	Win	12–0	Robinson Castellanos	TKO	5 (6), 0:11	May 17, 2008	Plaza de Toros Monumental, Aguascalientes City, Mexico	
11	Win	11–0	Jorge Ruiz	TKO	5 (6), 1:35	Feb 16, 2008	MGM Grand Garden Arena, Paradise, Nevada, U.S.	
10	Win	10–0	Manuel Sarabia	UD	6	Sep 20, 2007	Sagebrush Cantina, Calabasas, California, U.S.	
9	Win	9–0	Reggie Sanders	KO	3 (6), 2:23	Jul 13, 2007	Congress Theater, Chicago, Illinois, U.S.	
8	Win	8–0	Carlos Zambrano	TKO	2 (6), 2:45	May 25, 2007	Isleta Resort & Casino, Albuquerque, New Mexico, U.S.	
7	Win	7–0	Steve Trumble	TKO	2 (6), 2:30	Apr 27, 2007	Crowne Plaza Hotel, Houston, Texas, U.S.	
6	Win	6–0	Gabriel Rangel	TKO	2 (4), 1:56	Mar 9, 2007	Dodge Arena, Hidalgo, Texas, U.S.	
5	Win	5–0	Frankie Martinez	TKO	2 (4), 1:51	Jan 19, 2007	Dodge Theatre, Phoenix, Arizona, U.S.	
4	Win	4–0	Baladan Trevizo	KO	1 (4), 2:18	Dec 8, 2006	Florentine Gardens, El Monte, California, U.S.	
3	Win	3–0	Mario Franco	KO	2 (4), 0:52	Sep 29, 2006	Performing Arts Center, Oxnard, California, U.S.	
2	Win	2–0	Andrew Gannigan	KO	1 (4), 2:19	Aug 12, 2006	Thomas & Mack Center, Paradise, Nevada, U.S.	
1	Win	1–0	Herrera Mendoza	UD	4	Jul 14, 2006	Quiet Cannon, Montebello, California, U.S.	

== Exhibition boxing record ==
1 fight	0 wins	0 losses
Non-scored	1	

No.	Result	Record	Opponent	Type	Round, time	Date	Location	Notes
1	—N/a	0–0 (1)	Érik Morales	—N/a	4	Jun 23, 2019	E Club Center, San Bernardino, California, U.S.	Non-scored bout

== Titles in boxing ==
=== Major world titles ===
- WBO featherweight champion (126 lbs)
- WBO junior lightweight champion (130 lbs)
- WBC lightweight champion (135 lbs)
- IBF lightweight champion (135 lbs)
- IBF light welterweight Champion (140 lbs)

=== The Ring magazine titles ===
- The Ring featherweight champion (126 lbs)

=== Regional/International titles ===
- NABF featherweight champion (126 lbs)
- USBA featherweight champion (126 lbs)
- NABO featherweight champion (126 lbs)

=== Honorary titles ===
- WBC Diamond light welterweight champion
- WBC Diamond welterweight champion

== Filmography ==
Television Series
Year	Series	Role	Notes
2010	American Latino TV	Himself	Documentary
2013	2 Days: Mikey Garcia	Himself	Documentary
2013	24/7:Pacquiao/Rios	Himself	Documentary
2014	All Access: Mayweather vs. Maidana	Himself	Documentary
2014	All Access: Mayweather vs. Maidana II	Himself	Documentary

== See also ==
- Notable boxing families
- List of boxing quadruple champions
- List of featherweight boxing champions
- List of super-featherweight boxing champions
- List of lightweight boxing champions
- List of light-welterweight boxing champions
- List of Mexican boxing world champions

Sporting positions
Regional boxing titles
Vacant Title last held by Jose Hernandez	IBF–USBA featherweight champion April 3, 2010 – May 2010; Vacated	Vacant Title next held by Eric Hunter
Preceded by Matt Remillard	WBC–NABF featherweight champion March 26, 2011 – September 2012; Vacated	Vacant Title next held by Ronny Rios
Preceded by Matt Remillard	WBO–NABO featherweight champion March 26, 2011 – September 2012; Vacated	Vacant Title next held by Gamalier Rodriguez
World boxing titles
Preceded by Orlando Salido	WBO featherweight champion January 19, 2013 – June 14, 2013; Stripped	Vacant Title next held by Orlando Salido
Vacant Title last held by Manny Pacquiao	The Ring featherweight champion January 19, 2013 – November 24, 2014; Vacated	Vacant
Preceded by Román Martínez	WBO junior lightweight champion November 9, 2013 – October 15, 2014; Vacated	Succeeded by Orlando Salido promoted from interim status
Preceded by Dejan Zlatičanin	WBC lightweight champion January 28, 2017 – April 23, 2019; Vacated	Vacant Title next held by Vasyl Lomachenko
Preceded by Sergey Lipinets	IBF junior welterweight champion March 10, 2018 – April 15, 2018; Vacated	Vacant Title next held by Ivan Baranchyk
Vacant Title last held by Terence Crawford	Lineal junior welterweight champion March 10, 2018 – March 3, 2020; Vacated	Vacant
Preceded by Robert Easter Jr.	IBF lightweight champion July 28, 2018 – October 30, 2018; Vacated	Vacant Title next held by Richard Commey
