= Carlos Manuel Rivera =

Puerto Rican boxer

Carlos Manuel Rivera (born January 1, 1978) is an American professional boxer of Puerto Rican descent, who fights in the Featherweight division. His nickname is El Rayo.

== Pro career ==
On May 8, 2009 Rivera beat the veteran Alex Baba at the A La Carte Event Pavilion in Tampa, Florida.

In August 2009, Carlos lost to an undefeated Mikey Garcia, the bout was televised on TV Azteca.
