= Tevin Farmer =

American boxer

Personal information
- Nickname: American Idol
- Born: July 30, 1990 (age 36) Philadelphia, Pennsylvania, U.S.
- Height: 5 ft 6 in (168 cm)
- Weight: Super featherweight Lightweight

Boxing career
- Reach: 67 in (170 cm)
- Stance: Southpaw

Boxing record
- Total fights: 45
- Wins: 34
- Win by KO: 9
- Losses: 9
- Draws: 1
- No contests: 1

Tevin Farmer (born July 30, 1990) is an American professional boxer who held the IBF super featherweight title from 2018 to 2020. Farmer, who is right handed but fights in a southpaw stance, is known for his excellent boxing skills and speed.

== Professional boxing career ==
Farmer started his boxing career when he was 19 admitting that in his early pro career he wasn't taking boxing seriously enough which lead to some early career losses.

However having have no losses on his record since his 12th fight in 2012 he earned his way to a world title shot and in his 31st professional bout in December 2017 he fought Kenichi Ogawa for the IBF super featherweight world title, which he lost at the time but it was later switched to a no contest due to the fact his opponent had tested positive in a drugs test pre fight.

Farmer travelled to Australia in August 2018 to land the title in the backyard of Sydney's Billy Dib. It was announced in August 2018 Tevin Farmer had signed a co promotional deal with Dibella Entertainment and Eddie Hearn's Matchroom Boxing USA with his first bout being aired on the new sports streaming platform DAZN.

On 15 March 2019, Tevin Farmer was slated to defend his IBF super featherweight title against Jono Carroll. Carroll proved to be a tough opponent and the fight was close. Farmer, however, would win the fight convincingly in all three judges' scorecards, who scored the fight 117-111, 117-111 and 117-110 in favor of the champion.

His fourth title defence came against Guillaume Frenois. Farmer had another convincing unanimous decision win, winning on all three scorecards, 119-108, 116-111 and 116-111.

On 30 January 2020, Farmer defended his title against former title challenger Joseph Diaz Jr. Things went badly pretty early for Farmer, as after the first round he reported to his corner that he broke his hand. Diaz Jr took advantage of the situation and outboxed Farmer throughout most of the fight, earning the unanimous decision victory to win his first world title.

== Personal life ==
Farmer's great uncle is Joe Gans who was the first native born black American to win a world title. In July 2017 Farmer suffered a career threatening injury when he was shot in the hand during an altercation at his niece's birthday party where he attempted to disarm the person holding the gun and was told by doctors he would never box again.

== Professional boxing record ==
45 fights	34 wins	9 losses
By knockout	9	3
By decision	25	6
Draws	1	
No contests	1	

No.	Result	Record	Opponent	Type	Round, time	Date	Location	Notes
45	Win	34–9–1 (1)	Yonfrez Parejo	KO	2 (10), 1:19	May 22, 2026	LIVE Casino, Philadelphia, Pennsylvania, U.S.	
44	Loss	33–9–1 (1)	Floyd Schofield	KO	1 (10), 1:18	Jun 28, 2025	Honda Center, Anaheim, California, U.S.	For vacant WBA Continental lightweight title
43	Loss	33–8–1 (1)	William Zepeda	MD	12	Mar 29, 2025	Poliforum Benito Juarez, Cancún, Mexico	For WBC interim lightweight title
42	Loss	33–7–1 (1)	William Zepeda	SD	10	Nov 16, 2024	The Venue Riyadh Season, Riyadh, Saudi Arabia	For vacant WBC interim lightweight title
41	Loss	33–6–1 (1)	Raymond Muratalla	UD	10	Jul 13, 2024	Palms Casino Resort, Paradise, Nevada, U.S.	For WBC–NABF and vacant WBO–NABO lightweight titles
40	Win	33–5–1 (1)	Alan Castillo	KO	1 (8), 1:49	Mar 2, 2024	Showboat Hotel, Atlantic City, New Jersey, U.S.	
39	Win	32–5–1 (1)	Oscar Barajas	KO	6 (8), 1:51	Sep 29, 2023	2300 Arena, Philadelphia, Pennsylvania, U.S.	
38	Win	31–5–1 (1)	Avery Sparrow	UD	10	Jun 24, 2023	2300 Arena, Philadelphia, Pennsylvania, U.S.	
37	Loss	30–5–1 (1)	Joseph Diaz	UD	12	Jan 30, 2020	Meridian at Island Gardens, Miami, Florida, U.S.	Lost IBF super featherweight title
36	Win	30–4–1 (1)	Guillaume Frenois	UD	12	Jul 27, 2019	College Park Center, Arlington, Texas, U.S.	Retained IBF super featherweight title
35	Win	29–4–1 (1)	Jono Carroll	UD	12	Mar 15, 2019	Liacouras Center, Philadelphia, Pennsylvania, U.S.	Retained IBF super featherweight title
34	Win	28–4–1 (1)	Francisco Fonseca	UD	12	Dec 15, 2018	Madison Square Garden, New York City, New York U.S.	Retained IBF super featherweight title
33	Win	27–4–1 (1)	James Tennyson	KO	5 (12), 1:44	Oct 20, 2018	TD Garden, Boston, Massachusetts, U.S.	Retained IBF super featherweight title
32	Win	26–4–1 (1)	Billy Dib	UD	12	Aug 3, 2018	Technology Park, Sydney, Australia	Won vacant IBF super featherweight title
31	NC	25–4–1 (1)	Kenichi Ogawa	NC	12	Dec 9, 2017	Mandalay Bay Events Center, Paradise, Nevada, U.S.	Vacant IBF super featherweight title at stake; Originally an SD win for Ogawa, later ruled an NC after he failed a drug test
30	Win	25–4–1	Arturo Santos Reyes	UD	10	Apr 29, 2017	Liacouras Center, Philadelphia, Pennsylvania, U.S.	
29	Win	24–4–1	Dardan Zenunaj	UD	10	Dec 2, 2016	2300 Arena, Philadelphia, Pennsylvania, U.S.	Retained WBC–NABF super featherweight title
28	Win	23–4–1	Orlando Rizo	UD	8	Oct 14, 2016	2300 Arena, Philadelphia, Pennsylvania, U.S.	
27	Win	22–4–1	Ivan Redkach	UD	10	Jul 30, 2016	Barclays Center, Brooklyn, New York, U.S.	
26	Win	21–4–1	Gamaliel Diaz	UD	10	Mar 30, 2016	B.B. King Blues Club & Grill, New York, New York, U.S.	Won vacant WBC–NABF super featherweight title
25	Win	20–4–1	Daulis Prescott	KO	8 (10), 0:52	Aug 8, 2015	Fantasy Springs Resort Casino, Indio, California, U.S.	
24	Win	19–4–1	Angel Luna	UD	8	Apr 17, 2015	Mohegan Sun Arena, Montville, Connecticut, U.S.	
23	Win	18–4–1	Viktor Chernous	UD	8	Jan 9, 2015	Morongo Casino, Resort & Spa, Cabazon, California, U.S.	
22	Win	17–4–1	Dominic Coca	TKO	1 (8), 1:41	Oct 11, 2014	ABC Sports Complex, Springfield, Virginia, U.S.	
21	Win	16–4–1	Emanuel Gonzalez	UD	10	Jun 13, 2014	House of Blues, Boston, Massachusetts, U.S.	
20	Win	15–4–1	Noel Echevarria	UD	8	Jan 31, 2014	Harrah's Philadelphia, Chester, Pennsylvania, U.S.	
19	Win	14–4–1	Carlos Vinan	RTD	6 (8), 3:00	Dec 11, 2013	Econo Lodge, Allentown, Pennsylvania, U.S.	
18	Win	13–4–1	Camilo Perez	UD	8	Oct 25, 2013	National Guard Armory, Philadelphia, Pennsylvania, U.S.	
17	Win	12–4–1	Johnny Frazier	UD	8	Jul 20, 2013	The Outdoor Miage, Greensboro, North Carolina, U.S.	
16	Win	11–4–1	Victor Vasquez	TKO	8 (8), 1:58	Jun 15, 2013	Casino Resort, Valley Forge, Pennsylvania, U.S.	Won UBC International lightweight title
15	Win	10–4–1	Jesus Bayron	UD	4	Apr 26, 2013	National Guard Armory, Philadelphia, Pennsylvania, U.S.	
14	Win	9–4–1	Esteban Rodriguez	UD	6	Mar 15, 2013	Convention Center, Valley Forge, Pennsylvania, U.S.	
13	Win	8–4–1	John Willoughby	UD	6	Feb 16, 2013	Benton Convention Center, Winston-Salem, North Carolina, U.S.	
12	Loss	7–4–1	José Pedraza	TKO	8 (8), 0:47	Oct 12, 2012	Ameristar Casino, Saint Charles, Missouri, U.S.	
11	Win	7–3–1	Rasool Shakoor	UD	8	Jul 28, 2012	Civic Center, Columbus, Ohio, U.S.	
10	Win	6–3–1	Tyrone Luckey	SD	4	Jun 1, 2012	Sands Event Center, Bethlehem, Pennsylvania, U.S.	
9	Win	5–3–1	Kareem Cooley	UD	6	May 12, 2012	The NAC, Newton Township, Pennsylvania, U.S.	
8	Loss	4–3–1	Kamil Łaszczyk	UD	8	Mar 24, 2012	Resorts Casino Hotel, Atlantic City, New Jersey, U.S.	For vacant WBO Youth super featherweight title
7	Win	4–2–1	Tim Witherspoon Jr	MD	6	Jan 13, 2012	National Guard Armory, Philadelphia, Pennsylvania, U.S.	
6	Win	3–2–1	Ian James	TKO	2 (4), 0:23	Dec 15, 2011	Schuetzen Park, North Bergen, New Jersey, U.S.	
5	Draw	2–2–1	Frank De Alba	SD	4	Nov 18, 2011	Crowne Plaza Resort, Wyomissing, Pennsylvania, U.S.	
4	Loss	2–2	Josh Bowles	UD	4	Oct 21, 2011	Rodeway Inn, Allentown, Pennsylvania, U.S.	
3	Win	2–1	Joshua Arocho	UD	4	Sep 9, 2011	Asylum Arena, Philadelphia, Pennsylvania, U.S.	
2	Win	1–1	Angelo Ward	UD	4	Apr 15, 2011	Maryland Sportsplex, Millersville, Maryland, U.S.	
1	Loss	0–1	Oscar Santana	TKO	4 (4), 0:24	Feb 10, 2011	Convention Center, Baltimore, Maryland, U.S.	

== See also ==
- List of world super-featherweight boxing champions

Sporting positions
Regional boxing titles
Vacant Title last held by Francisco Vargas	NABF super featherweight champion March 30, 2016 – April 29, 2017; Vacated	Vacant Title next held by Ryan Garcia
World boxing titles
Vacant Title last held by Gervonta Davis	IBF super featherweight champion August 3, 2018 – January 30, 2020	Succeeded by Joseph Diaz
