= Pedro Navarrete =

Mexican boxer (born 1981)

Personal information
- Nickname: El Vaquero
- Born: Pedro Zenon Navarrete Montaño; 30 July 1981 (age 44) Zumpango, Mexico
- Height: 1.70 m (5 ft 7 in)
- Weight: Lightweight

Boxing career
- Stance: Orthodox

Boxing record
- Total fights: 58
- Wins: 30
- Win by KO: 19
- Losses: 25
- Draws: 3

Pedro Zenon Navarrete Montaño (born 30 July 1981) is a Mexican professional boxer. Pedro is the former WBC CABOFE Featherweight and WBC FECOMBOX Super Featherweight Champion.

== Professional career ==
On 3 May 2007 Navarrete beat Gerardo Mijares to win the inaugural WBC FECOMBOX Super Featherweight title.

In May 2010, Pedro lost to undefeated Mikey Garcia on the undercard of Antonio Margarito vs. Roberto García.
