= Sergio García (boxer) =

Spanish boxer (born 1992)

Personal information
- Nickname: El Niño
- Born: Sergio García Gómez; 9 October 1992 (age 33) Torrelavega, Cantabria, Spain
- Height: 6 ft 1 in (185 cm)
- Weight: Light-middleweight

Boxing career
- Reach: 73 in (185 cm)
- Stance: Orthodox

Boxing record
- Total fights: 38
- Wins: 35
- Win by KO: 15
- Losses: 3

Sergio García Gómez (born 9 October 1992) is a Spanish professional boxer who held the European super-welterweight title from 2018 to 2021.

== Professional career ==
=== Early career ===
García began boxing professionally at the age of 19, defeating Celestino Chacon by knockout on his debut in Maliaño, Spain, on 26 May 2012. Having won his first eight fights, García signed a promotional deal with Maravillabox Promotions in September 2013. In his ninth fight, he secured his first professional boxing title when he won the vacant WBC Mundo Hispano super welterweight title courtesy of a late TKO stoppage of compatriot Raul Asencio in Castellón de la Plana on 25 October 2013. He picked up domestic honours, securing the vacant Spanish super welterweight title in Torrelavega on 29 November 2014. He won the title following a third round stoppage of Jose Manuel Lopez Clavero, taking his record to 16–0 in the process.

He fought Russian Pavel Mamontov for the WBC International super welterweight title in Torrelavega on 4 June 2016. García won the fight by unanimous decision, winning comfortably on the judges' scorecards. García made a further step up when he defeated compatriot Isaac Real in Barcelona a year later, on 10 June 2017, in doing so he won the WBC Silver super welterweight title. García won the fight by unanimous decision. He successfully defended his WBC Silver title back in Torrelavega on 22 September 2017, his opponent Felipe Moncelli retired in the seventh round of the contest.

=== European super welterweight champion ===
García was scheduled to fight Zakaria Attou for the vacant European super welterweight title, but Attou was forced to withdraw due to a cut sustained in sparring. Attou was replaced at late notice by Frenchman Maxime Beaussire. The fight took place in Torrelavega on 29 September 2018, García securing a comprehensive victory by unanimous decision, with the judges scoring the bout 120–108, 119–109 and 118–110 respectively.

He agreed a deal to defend his title against unbeaten British boxer Ted Cheeseman at The O2 Arena in London on 2 February 2019, the main event on the card. This meant that García would be fighting outside of his home country for the first time in his professional career. García stated that he hoped that defeating Cheeseman would open up opportunities to fight at world level. García secured a comprehensive unanimous decision victory over Cheeseman to retain his title, with two judges scoring the fight 119–109, whilst the other judge scored it 115–114. García retained his European title once again on 22 June 2019, defeating Sergey Rabchenko by unanimous decision in Torrelavega; the judges scorecards reading 119–109,119–110 and 117–111 in García's favour.

== Professional boxing record ==
37 fights	34 wins	3 losses
By knockout	14	1
By decision	20	2

No.	Result	Record	Opponent	Type	Round, time	Date	Location	Notes
37	Loss	34–3	Yoenis Tellez	TKO	3 (10) 2:01	29 Jul 2023	T-Mobile Arena, Paradise, Nevada, U.S.	
36	Win	34–2	Sebastian Cabaña	UD	10	15 Apr 2023	Polideportivo Vicente Trueba, Torrelavega, Spain	
35	Loss	33–2	Tony Harrison	UD	10	9 Apr 2022	The Theater at Virgin Hotels, Paradise, Nevada, U.S.	For vacant WBC silver super-welterweight title
34	Loss	33–1	Sebastian Fundora	UD	12	5 Dec 2021	Staples Center, Los Angeles, California, U.S.	
33	Win	33–0	Gregory Trenel	TKO	6 (10), 2:39	19 Dec 2020	Bolera Severino Prieto, Torrelavega, Spain	
32	Win	32–0	Pablo Mendoza	UD	10	21 Aug 2020	El Malecon, Torrelavega, Spain	
31	Win	31–0	Fouad El Massoudi	UD	12	7 Dec 2019	Polideportivo Vicente Trueba, Torrelavega, Spain	
30	Win	30–0	Sergey Rabchenko	UD	12	22 Jun 2019	Polideportivo Vicente Trueba, Torrelavega, Spain	Retained European super-welterweight title
29	Win	29–0	Ted Cheeseman	UD	12	2 Feb 2019	The O2 Arena, London, England	Retained European super-welterweight title
28	Win	28–0	Maxime Beaussire	UD	12	29 Sep 2018	Polideportivo Vicente Trueba, Torrelavega, Spain	Won vacant European super-welterweight title
27	Win	27–0	Giorgi Kerdikoshvili	PTS	8	11 May 2018	Palacio de los Deportes, Oviedo, Spain	
26	Win	26–0	Jeffrey Rosales	PTS	8	3 Feb 2018	Frontón Bizkaia, Bilbao, Spain	
25	Win	25–0	Felice Moncelli	RTD	7 (12), 3:00	22 Sep 2017	Polideportivo Vicente Trueba, Torrelavega, Spain	Retained WBC Silver super-welterweight title
24	Win	24–0	Isaac Real	UD	12	10 Jun 2017	Palau Olímpic Vall d'Hebron, Barcelona, Spain	Won vacant WBC Silver super-welterweight title
23	Win	23–0	Nelson Altamirano	TKO	2 (8), 1:19	1 Apr 2017	Pabellón María Pardo, Torrelavega, Spain	
22	Win	22–0	Michael Mora	PTS	8	23 Jul 2016	Palacio de los Deportes, Benidorm, Spain	
21	Win	21–0	Pavel Mamontov	UD	12	4 Jun 2016	Bolera Severino Prieto, Torrelavega, Spain	Won vacant WBC International super-welterweight title
20	Win	20–0	Igor Faniian	UD	10	12 Mar 2016	Polideportivo Vicente Trueba, Torrelavega, Spain	
19	Win	19–0	Alan Casillas	TKO	6 (8), 0:58	17 Oct 2015	Pabellón Río Viar, Torrelavega, Spain	
18	Win	18–0	Karlo Tabaghua	UD	8	11 Apr 2015	Palacio de los Deportes, Benidorm, Spain	
17	Win	17–0	Pavel Semjonov	UD	8	28 Feb 2015	Pabellón Fernando Expósito, Renedo de Pielagos, Spain	
16	Win	16–0	Jose Manuel Lopez Clavero	TKO	3 (10), 2:59	29 Nov 2014	El Ferial, Torrelavega, Spain	Won vacant Spanish super-welterweight title
15	Win	15–0	Giorgi Ungiadze	UD	8	4 Oct 2014	Pabellon Multiusos La Lechera, Torrelavega, Spain	
14	Win	14–0	Francisco Tejedor	TKO	2 (8), 2:17	28 Jun 2014	Hotel El Asador de Enrique, Madrid, Spain	
13	Win	13–0	Kobe Vandekerkhove	UD	8	9 May 2014	Gran Canaria Arena, Las Palmas, Spain	
12	Win	12–0	Euclides Espitia	UD	6	22 Mar 2014	Hotel El Asador de Enrique, Madrid, Spain	
11	Win	11–0	Feliks Kleins	TKO	2 (8), 2:56	21 Dec 2013	Pabellon Esperanza Lag, Elche, Spain	
10	Win	10–0	Raul Asencio	TKO	9 (10), 1:02	25 Oct 2013	Recinto de La Pérgola, Castellón de la Plana, Spain	Won vacant WBC Mundo Hispano super-welterweight title
9	Win	9–0	Rafael Chiruta	UD	6	19 Oct 2013	Bolera Jesus Vela, Renedo de Pielagos, Spain	
8	Win	8–0	Santos Medrano	UD	6	30 Aug 2013	Laredo, Cantabria, Spain	
7	Win	7–0	Julio Alberto Barsena	RTD	3 (6), 3:00	24 May 2013	Argoños, Spain	
6	Win	6–0	Mehdi El Ahmar	KO	4 (6), 1:58	9 Mar 2013	Solares, Spain	
5	Win	5–0	Enrique Celis	TKO	4 (4), 2:58	2 Feb 2013	Palacio de los Deportes, Madrid, Spain	
4	Win	4–0	Carlos Faria	KO	3 (4), 1:43	1 Dec 2012	Pabellon Pedro Velarde, Maliaño, Spain	
3	Win	3–0	Julio Sanchez	PTS	4	27 Oct 2012	Bolera Jesus Vela, Renedo de Pielagos, Spain	
2	Win	2–0	Raul Gonzalez	TKO	3 (4), 2:44	14 Sep 2012	Beranga, Spain	
1	Win	1–0	Celestino Chacon	KO	4 (4), 0:30	26 May 2012	Pabellon Pedro Velarde, Maliaño, Spain	
