= Ivan Redkach =

Ukrainian boxer

Personal information
- Nickname: El Terrible
- Nationality: Ukrainian
- Born: Ivan Redkach; 11 March 1986 (age 40) Shostka, Ukrainian SSR
- Height: 5 ft 10 1/2 in (179 cm)
- Weight: Lightweight; Light-welterweight

Boxing career
- Reach: 71 in (180 cm)
- Stance: Southpaw

Boxing record
- Total fights: 34
- Wins: 24
- Win by KO: 19
- Losses: 8
- Draws: 1
- No contests: 1

Ivan Redkach (born 11 March 1986) is a Ukrainian professional boxer.

== Professional career ==
On 7 January 2011 Redkach fought and beat Jaime Orrantia by third-round knockout in Fairfield, California.

On 1 June 2019, he scored one of the biggest wins of his career, over former world champion Devon Alexander. In the sixth round, Redkach connected with a left-hand to floor Alexander for the first time in the bout. He managed to drop Alexander two more times in the round, with the third knockdown also being the last of the fight, forcing the referee to stop the fight.

In his next fight, he faced another former world champion in Danny García. The fight didn't include a lot of action, however, despite that García looked like the clear winner, hurting Redkach late in the fifth, and cutting him in the seventh round. During the eighth round, Redkach bit García on the shoulder while allegedly saying "Mike Tyson" to García during the process. The judges awarded García a unanimous decision victory, scoring the fight 118–110, 117–111 and 117–111 in favor of the former champion.

Following his fight against Garcia, Redkach took on Regis Prograis on April 17, 2021 in Atlanta. In the sixth round, Prograis landed a glancing blow to Redkach's kidney area. Redkach responded by dropping to the canvas holding his groin as if Prograis had hit him below the belt. The fight was stopped due to the punch, and because the ruling by referee Jim Morb was that it was due to an accidental low blow, a technical decision was rendered and Prograis was declared the winner. Prograis protested the decision, saying that he knocked out Redkach, and after an appeal the decision was changed from a technical decision to a technical knockout defeat for Redkach.

== Professional boxing record ==
34 fights	24 wins	8 losses
By knockout	19	5
By decision	5	3
Draws	1	
No contests	1	

No.	Result	Record	Opponent	Type	Round, time	Date	Location	Notes
34	Loss	24–8–1 (1)	Jose Zepeda	KO	2 (10), 2:02	6 Sept 2024	Pechanga Resort & Casino, Temecula, California, US	For Interim WBC Silver Welterweight Title
33	Loss	24–7–1 (1)	Batyrzhan Jukembayev	TKO	5 (10), 2:15	22 May 2024	ProBox TV Events Center, Plant City, Florida, US	
32	Win	24–6–1 (1)	Elvin Perez	RTD	3 (8), 3:00	11 Jul 2023	BN Arena, Hatillo, Costa Rica	
31	Loss	23–6–1 (1)	Regis Prograis	TKO	6 (10), 1:21	17 Apr 2021	Mercedes-Benz Stadium, Atlanta, Georgia, US	Fight was originally scored as technical decision for Prograis due to accidental low blow; decision later changed to TKO.
30	Loss	23–5–1 (1)	Danny García	UD	12	25 Jan 2020	Barclays Center, New York City, New York, US	For WBC Silver welterweight title
29	Win	23–4–1 (1)	Devon Alexander	TKO	6 (10), 1:10	1 Jun 2019	Soboba Casino Resort, San Jacinto, California, US	
28	Win	22–4–1 (1)	Tyrone Harris	KO	1 (8), 2:49	16 Feb 2019	Microsoft Theater, Los Angeles, California, US	
27	Win	21–4–1 (1)	Brian Jones	UD	8	9 Jun 2018	Staples Center, Los Angeles, California, US	
26	Loss	20–4–1 (1)	John Molina Jr.	KO	4 (10), 1:27	15 Dec 2017	Pioneer Event Center, Lancaster, California, US	
25	Loss	20–3–1 (1)	Argenis Mendez	SD	10	2 May 2017	Sportsmans Lodge, Studio City, California, US	
24	Win	20–2–1 (1)	Demond Brock	TKO	8 (8)	28 Jan 2017	MGM Grand, Las Vegas, Nevada, US	
23	Loss	19–2–1 (1)	Tevin Farmer	UD	10	30 Jul 2016	Barclays Center, New York City, New York, US	
22	Draw	19–1–1 (1)	Luis Cruz	SD	10	20 Apr 2016	Sands Bethlehem Event Center Bethlehem, Pennsylvania, US	
21	Win	19–1 (1)	Erick Daniel Martinez	KO	3 (10), 2:59	14 Oct 2015	Gila River Arena, Glendale, Arizona, US	
20	Loss	18–1 (1)	Dejan Zlaticanin	TKO	4 (12), 1:24	13 Jun 2015	Bartow Arena, Birmingham, Alabama, US	
19	Win	18–0 (1)	Yakubu Amidu	RTD	6 (10), 3:00	9 Jan 2015	Morongo Casino, Resort & Spa, Cabazon, California, US	
18	Win	17–0 (1)	Sergey Gulyakevich	UD	10	27 Jun 2014	Ameristar Casino, Saint Charles, Missouri, US	
17	Win	16–0 (1)	Tony Luis	UD	10	17 Jan 2014	Cook Convention Center, Memphis, Tennessee, US	Won vacant IBF-USBA lightweight title
16	Win	15–0 (1)	Lowell Brownfield	TKO	3 (8), 2:36	8 Nov 2013	Ameristar Casino, Saint Charles, Missouri, US	
15	NC	14–0 (1)	Antonio Sanchez	ND	2 (6), 2:11	13 Sep 2013	Twin River Event Center, Lincoln, Rhode Island, US	
14	Win	14–0	Sergio Rivera	TKO	1 (8), 2:06	21 Feb 2013	Roseland Ballroom, New York City, New York, US	
13	Win	13–0	Edward Valdez	UD	8	19 Dec 2012	Roseland Ballroom, New York City, New York, US	
12	Win	12–0	Tebor Brosch	TKO	1 (8), 2:07	24 Oct 2012	Roseland Ballroom, New York City, New York, US	
11	Win	11–0	Dedrick Bell	TKO	1 (6), 1:55	14 Jun 2012	Roseland Ballroom, New York City, New York, US	
10	Win	10–0	Rynell Griffin	TKO	1 (8), 2:47	27 Apr 2012	Buffalo Run Casino, Miami, Oklahoma, US	
9	Win	9–0	Dillet Frederick	KO	4 (6), 1:58	30 Dec 2011	Morongo Casino, Resort & Spa, Cabazon, California, US	
8	Win	8–0	Vernon Alston	TKO	3 (6), 1:57	3 Sep 2011	Beau Rivage Resort & Casino, Biloxi, Mississippi, US	
7	Win	7–0	Alberto Amaro	TKO	6 (6), 1:46	4 Jun 2011	Boardwalk Hall, Atlantic City, New Jersey, US	
6	Win	6–0	Jaime Orrantia	KO	3 (6), 1:43	7 Jan 2011	Sports Center, Fairfield, California, US	
5	Win	5–0	Carlos Hernandez	DQ	3 (6)	18 Nov 2010	Club Nokia, Los Angeles, California, US	
4	Win	4–0	Theron DeLorme	TKO	2 (4), 2:04	14 May 2010	Buffalo Bill's Star Arena, Primm, Nevada, US	
3	Win	3–0	John Lopez	KO	3 (4), 1:52	25 Mar 2010	Commerce Casino, Commerce, California, US	
2	Win	2–0	Napoleon Matthews	TKO	1 (4), 1:10	17 Dec 2009	Commerce Casino, Commerce, California, US	
1	Win	1–0	Keith Kelly	TKO	1 (4), 0:49	3 Nov 2009	Commerce Casino, Commerce, California, US	
