= Sebastian Zbik vs. Julio César Chávez Jr. =

Boxing competition

La Hora De la Verdad
- Date: June 4, 2011
- Venue: Staples Center, Los Angeles, California, US
- Title(s) on the line: WBC Middleweight Championship

Tale of the tape
Boxer	(Germany) Sebastian Zbik	(Mexico) Julio César Chávez Jr.
Nickname		"La Leyenda Continua"
Hometown	Schwerin, Mecklenburg, Germany	Culiacán, Sinaloa, Mexico
Purse	$292,500	$600,000
Pre-fight record	30–0 (10 KO)	42–0–1 (30 KO)
Age	29 years, 2 months	25 years, 3 months
Height	5 ft 11 1/2 in (182 cm)	6 ft 1 in (185 cm)
Weight	158.8 lb (72 kg)	160 lb (73 kg)
Style	Orthodox	Orthodox
Recognition	WBC; Middleweight Champion	WBC; No. 1 Ranked Middleweight; WBC Silver Middleweight Champion

Result
- Chávez defeated Zbik via Majority Decision

Sebastian Zbik vs. Julio César Chávez Jr., billed as "La Hora De la Verdad", was a professional boxing match contested on June 4, 2011, for the WBC Middleweight championship. It was the first time that the son of legendary boxing Champion Julio César Chávez, fought for a world title. The bout was on June 4, 2011, at Staples Center, in Los Angeles, California and was broadcast on HBO.

== Background ==
Lineal and The Ring middleweight champion Sergio Martínez was stripped by the WBC after HBO declined to broadcast a bout between him and "Interim" champion Sebastian Zbik, following his victory over Paul Williams. Zbik would be upgraded to full champion and would agree to face their top ranked contender Julio César Chávez Jr.

== The fight ==
Zbik was ahead early against Chávez, who was the quicker fighter and landed more punches. However Chávez kept coming forward, countering with hard body shots that seemed to slow the champion down.

After 12 rounds had been completed, judge Steve Morrow had 114–114, while Raul Caiz Jr scored it 115–113 and John Keane 116–112 both in favour of Chavez giving him a majority decision victory. HBO's unofficial scorer Harold Lederman scored the fight 116-112 for Chávez Jr.

== Aftermath ==
This was the fourth time in boxing's history that a father and son combination would both become World Champions. This was also the second combo for the country of Mexico, the first ones being Guty Espadas and Guty Espadas, Jr.

== Main card ==
- Middleweight Championship (Germany) Sebastian Zbik vs. (Mexico) Julio César Chávez Jr.
  - Chávez defeated Zbik via majority decision (112-116, 114-115, 114-114).
- Featherweight bout: (United States) Miguel Angel Garcia vs. (Mexico) Rafaël Guzmán
  - Garcia defeated Guzmán via knockout at 1:55 in the fourth round.

=== Preliminary card ===
Confirmed bouts:

- Light Welterweight bout: (United States) Oscar Andrade vs. (Japan) Kai Zama
  - Andrade defeated Zama via technical knockout at 2:15 in the first round.
- Lightweight bout: (United States) Jessie Román vs. (United States) James Grant
  - Román defeated Grant via knockout at 1:00 in the second round.
- Lightweight bout: (United States) Alejandro Luna vs. (Mexico) Pablo Cesar Garcia
  - Luna defeated Garcia via unanimous decision (40-36, 40-36, 40-36).
- Light Middleweight bout: (United States) Vanes Martirosyan vs. (Mexico) Saúl Román
  - Martirosyan defeated Román via technical knockout at 2:58 in the seventh round.
- Light Middleweight bout: (United States) Dakota Stone vs. (United States) Christy Martin
  - Stone defeated Martin via technical knockout at 1:09 in the sixth round.

== Reported fight earnings ==
These are the payouts to some of the fighters. These are the California State Athletic Commission purses as per the California bout agreements. They don't include sponsor money or other common forms of revenue paid through other streams. In California, if a fighter is more than two pounds overweight he is automatically penalized 20 percent of his purse and the weigh-in is over.

- Sebastian Zbik $292,500 vs. Julio César Chávez Jr. $600,000
- Miguel Angel Garcia $110,000 vs. Rafaël Guzmán$20,000
- Vanes Martirosyan $50,000 vs. Saúl Román$12,500
- Christy Martin $12,500 vs. Dakota Stone$3,500

== Broadcasting ==
Country	Broadcaster
United States	HBO

Preceded by vs. Jorge Sebastian Heiland	Sebastian Zbik's bouts June 4, 2011	Succeeded by vs. Felix Sturm
Preceded by vs. Billy Lyell	Julio César Chávez Jr.'s bouts June 4, 2011	Succeeded by vs. Peter Manfredo Jr.
