= Matt Remillard =

American boxer (born 1986)

Personal information
- Nickname: Sharp Shooter
- Nationality: American
- Born: Matthew Patrick Remillard; June 12, 1986 (age 40) Manchester, Connecticut, U.S.
- Height: 5 ft 7 in (170 cm)
- Weight: Featherweight; Super featherweight

Boxing career
- Reach: 70 in (178 cm)
- Stance: Orthodox

Boxing record
- Total fights: 28
- Wins: 27
- Win by KO: 15
- Losses: 1

Matthew Patrick Remillard (born June 12, 1986) is an American professional boxer. He won the regional NABF featherweight title in 2009, together with the WBO–NABO featherweight title in 2010. Both titles were lost to Mikey Garcia in 2011, which was Remillard's first loss.

== Amateur career ==
Matt had a lengthy amateur career and went on to win the Everlast Under-19 National Amateur Championships twice.

== Assault and Jail Time ==
On January 5, 2010, 22 year old Jordan Evans was savagely beaten with an aluminum baseball bat at a Marlborough, Connecticut home. It was alleged that a conspiracy to set up Evans was made by his current (and Remillard's former) girlfriend Danielle Napolitano, in conjunction with her brothers Adam Napolitano and Richard Napolitano, with Remillard carrying out the attack. Evans claimed that he was called to the home by his girlfriend, where Remillard lay in wait. Evans ran to his car but did not have his keys, at which time Remillard shattered the glass and proceeded to severely pummel Evans. Injuries incurred included fractures to the skull, eye socket and hands and "Doctors had to insert 150 stitches, more than two dozen screws and several plates into Evans' head."

== Showdown With Mikey Garcia ==
Despite the apparent distractions resulting from the pending criminal charges, Remillard won three fights in 2010, improving his record to 23–0 with 13 KO. On March 26, 2011, he faced the undefeated Mikey Garcia. Garcia won convincingly, knocking Remillard down twice in the 9th and once in the 10th. Remillard thereby lost both his NABF and WBO NABO featherweight titles. This bout was televised on HBO.

== Sentencing and Imprisonment ==
While the three Napolitano siblings were initially charged in the conspiracy, all had their charges dropped in cooperation with the prosecution of Remillard. In September 2011 he pled no contest to a charge of first degree assault. He was sentenced to 5 years imprisonment on November 29, 2011, by Judge Elpedio N. Vitale. Evans was outraged by the leniency of the sentence, calling it "a gift." Due to his imprisonment his fight with Garcia in 2011 remained his last until 2017. Remillard won four consecutive bouts following his release, but has remained inactive since March 2018.

=== Professional record ===
23 Wins (13 knockouts), 1 Losses, 0 Draw
Res.	Record	Opponent	Type	Rd., Time	Date	Location	Notes
Loss	23-1	(United States) Mikey Garcia	TKO	10 (12)	March 26, 2011	Boardwalk Hall, Atlantic City, New Jersey	For the NABF and WBO NABO Featherweight titles
