= Tony Harrison (boxer) =

American professional boxer

Personal information
- Nickname: Super Bad
- Born: September 6, 1990 (age 36) Detroit, Michigan, U.S.
- Height: 6 ft 1 in (185 cm)
- Weight: Light middleweight; Middleweight

Boxing career
- Reach: 76 in (193 cm)
- Stance: Orthodox

Boxing record
- Total fights: 36
- Wins: 31
- Win by KO: 22
- Losses: 4
- Draws: 1

Tony Harrison (born September 6, 1990) is an American professional boxer. He held the WBC light middleweight title from 2018 to 2019 and challenged once for the IBF light middleweight title in 2017. As of May 2022, Harrison is ranked as the world's fifth best active light middleweight by the Transnational Boxing Rankings Board and sixth by The Ring.

== Professional career ==
Harrison made his professional debut on July 2, 2011, scoring a first-round technical knockout (TKO) over Uwe Tritschler at the Imtech-Arena in Hamburg, Germany.

After compiling a record of 24–1 with 20 knockouts (KO) – his only defeat coming against Willie Nelson via ninth-round TKO in June 2015 – Harrison faced Jarrett Hurd (19-0, 13 KOs) on February 25, 2017, at the Legacy Arena in Birmingham, Alabama, with the bout being televised on Premier Boxing Champions (PBC) on FOX. The fight was supposed to be an IBF title eliminator for the right to fight Jermall Charlo, but when Charlo vacated the title the fight was elevated to be for the vacant title. In the ninth round, Harrison was knocked down by a right hook from Hurd, which resulted in the referee waving off the fight.

=== Harrison vs. Charlo ===
On October 23, 2018, it was announced that Tony Harrison would face Jermell Charlo for the WBC light middleweight title on December 22 on PBC on Fox and Fox Deportes at the Barclays Center in Brooklyn, New York. Harrison won by unanimous decision with two judges scoring the bout 115–113, while the third scored it 116–112.

=== Harrison vs. Charlo II ===
The rematch was a highly competitive bout, in which Charlo managed to regain the WBC light middleweight title. Charlo managed to drop Harrison in the second round, but Harrison managed to recover well. In the eleventh round, Charlo dropped Harrison twice and had him stuck on the ropes when the referee decided to end the fight.

=== Harrison vs. Garcia ===
On April 9, 2022, Harrison faced Sergio Garcia, ranked #4 by the WBC at super welterweight. Harrison won the bout convincingly on the scorecards, 100–90, 100-90 and 98–92.

=== Harrison vs. Tszyu ===
On the 22nd January 2023 it was announced Tony Harrison will be taking on Tim Tszyu for the interim WBO junior middleweight title on March 12 in Australia. He lost the bout by 9th round TKO.

== Professional boxing record ==
36 fights	31 wins	4 losses
By knockout	22	4
By decision	9	0
Draws	1	

No.	Result	Record	Opponent	Type	Round, time	Date	Location	Notes
36	Win	31–4–1	Brian Damian Chaves	KO	4 (10), 2:59	Dec 20, 2025	Fox Theatre, Detroit, Michigan, U.S.	
35	Win	30–4–1	Edward Uloa Diaz	UD	10	Jul 25, 2025	Little Caesars Arena, Detroit, Michigan, U.S.	
34	Loss	29–4–1	Tim Tszyu	TKO	9 (12), 2:43	Mar 12, 2023	Qudos Bank Arena, Sydney, Australia	For vacant WBO junior middleweight interim title
33	Win	29–3–1	Sergio García	UD	10	Apr 9, 2022	Virgin Hotels, Paradise, Nevada, U.S.	Won vacant WBC Silver light middleweight title
32	Draw	28–3–1	Bryant Perrella	SD	12	Apr 17, 2021	Shrine Auditorium and Expo Hall, Los Angeles, California, U.S.	
31	Loss	28–3	Jermell Charlo	TKO	11 (12), 2:28	Dec 21, 2019	Toyota Arena, Ontario, California, U.S.	Lost WBC light middleweight title
30	Win	28–2	Jermell Charlo	UD	12	Dec 22, 2018	Barclays Center, New York City, New York, U.S.	Won WBC light middleweight title
29	Win	27–2	Ishe Smith	SD	10	May 11, 2018	Sam's Town Hotel & Gambling Hall, Sunrise Manor, Nevada, U.S.	
28	Win	26–2	George Sosa	TKO	5 (6), 2:21	Feb 17, 2018	Don Haskins Center, El Paso, Texas, U.S.	
27	Win	25–2	Paul Valenzuela Jr	UD	8	Oct 14, 2017	Barclays Center, New York City, New York, U.S.	
26	Loss	24–2	Jarrett Hurd	TKO	9 (12), 2:24	Feb 25, 2017	Legacy Arena, Birmingham, Alabama, U.S.	For vacant IBF light middleweight title
25	Win	24–1	Sergey Rabchenko	TKO	9 (12), 1:18	Jul 30, 2016	Barclays Center, New York City, New York, U.S.	
24	Win	23–1	Fernando Guerrero	TKO	6 (10), 1:54	Mar 5, 2016	Sands Event Center, Bethlehem, Pennsylvania, U.S.	
23	Win	22–1	Cecil McCalla	UD	10	Oct 31, 2015	NRG Arena, Houston, Texas, U.S.	
22	Loss	21–1	Willie Nelson	TKO	9 (10), 2:57	Jul 11, 2015	USF Sun Dome, Tampa, Florida, U.S.	
21	Win	21–0	Pablo Munguia	TKO	3 (10), 0:11	Apr 17, 2015	Mohegan Sun Casino, Montville, Connecticut, U.S.	
20	Win	20–0	Antwone Smith	TKO	2 (10), 0:19	Mar 6, 2015	MGM Grand, Marquee Ballroom, Paradise, Nevada, U.S.	
19	Win	19–0	Tyrone Brunson	TKO	1 (8), 1:02	Dec 20, 2014	Little Creek Casino Resort, Shelton, Washington, U.S.	
18	Win	18–0	Bronco McKart	TKO	1 (10), 1:32	May 30, 2014	Cobo Center Ballroom, Detroit, Michigan, U.S.	
17	Win	17–0	Grady Brewer	TKO	2 (8), 2:55	Feb 7, 2014	Masonic Temple, Detroit, Michigan, U.S.	
16	Win	16–0	Donald Ward	TKO	2 (8), 1:01	Nov 27, 2013	Masonic Temple, Detroit, Michigan, U.S.	
15	Win	15–0	Marcos Primera	RTD	3 (6), 3:00	Sep 13, 2013	Masonic Temple, Detroit, Michigan, U.S.	
14	Win	14–0	Gilbert Alex Sanchez	TKO	2 (6), 2:10	Aug 3, 2013	Mohegan Sun Casino, Montville, Connecticut, U.S.	
13	Win	13–0	Ruben Galvan	KO	1 (6), 2:03	May 10, 2013	Masonic Temple, Detroit, Michigan, U.S.	
12	Win	12–0	Thomas Amaro	KO	1 (6), 1:35	Mar 7, 2013	Motor City Casino, Detroit, Michigan, U.S.	
11	Win	11–0	Daniel Urbanski	UD	6	Nov 10, 2012	O2 World Arena, Hamburg, Germany	
10	Win	10–0	Marqus Jackson	UD	6	Oct 12, 2012	Taylor Sportsplex, Taylor, Michigan, U.S.	
9	Win	9–0	Calvin Odom	UD	8	Jul 27, 2012	Pechanga Resort & Casino, Temecula, California, U.S.	
8	Win	8–0	Flavio Turelli	TKO	1 (6), 1:23	Jul 7, 2012	Stade de Suisse, Berne, Switzerland	
7	Win	7–0	Ishwar Amador	TKO	2 (6), 1:56	May 11, 2012	Pechanga Resort & Casino, Temecula, California, U.S.	
6	Win	6–0	Alfred Hall	TKO	2 (6), 2:55	Mar 10, 2012	Suburban Collection Showplace, Novi, Michigan, U.S.	
5	Win	5–0	Harun Akcabelen	KO	3 (6), 2:50	Mar 3, 2012	ESPRIT Arena, Düsseldorf, Germany	
4	Win	4–0	Dorian Hatcher	TKO	1 (4), 2:16	Oct 6, 2011	Motor City Casino, Detroit, Michigan, U.S.	
3	Win	3–0	Aloric Carson	RTD	1 (4), 3:00	Jul 30, 2011	U.S. Steel Yard, Gary, Indiana, U.S.	
2	Win	2–0	Tony Hervey	TKO	1 (4), 1:45	Jul 15, 2011	Royal Oak Music Theatre, Royal Oak, Michigan, U.S.	
1	Win	1–0	Uwe Tritschler	TKO	1 (4), 1:48	Jul 2, 2011	Imtech-Arena, Hamburg, Germany	

== See also ==
- List of light-middleweight boxing champions

Sporting positions
World boxing titles
Preceded by Jermell Charlo	WBC light middleweight champion December 22, 2018 – December 21, 2019	Succeeded by Jermell Charlo
