= Arturo Gómez =

Mexican boxer (born 1984)

Personal information
- Born: Luis Arturo Gómez Torres; 28 May 1984 (age 42) Mexico City, Mexico
- Height: 1.73 m (5 ft 8 in)

Boxing career
- Reach: 180 cm (71 in)
- Stance: Orthodox

Boxing record
- Total fights: 50
- Wins: 20
- Win by KO: 9
- Losses: 25
- Draws: 5

Luis Arturo Gómez Torres (born 28 May 1984) is a Mexican boxer who competed from 2003 to 2016.

== Professional career ==
Arturo won a ten-round decision over Sandro Marcos and then lost to undefeated Mikey Garcia.

=== WBC Mundo Hispano title ===
On 17 July 2010, Gómez beat Alexis Salinas to win the WBC Mundo Hispano lightweight title.

He has gone the distance with José Emilio Perea, Pedro Navarrete, Óscar Larios, Víctor Manuel Cayo, Juan Carlos Batista, Michael Farenas, and José Alfaro.
