= Elio Rojas =

Dominican Republic boxer

Personal information
- Nickname: The Kid
- Nationality: Dominican
- Born: Elio Enai Rojas; September 25, 1982 (age 43) San Francisco de Macorís, Dominican Republic
- Height: 5 ft 7 in (170 cm)
- Weight: Featherweight

Boxing career
- Reach: 70 in (178 cm)
- Stance: Orthodox

Boxing record
- Total fights: 27
- Wins: 24
- Win by KO: 14
- Losses: 3
Medal record
Men's boxing
Representing theDominican Republic
World Championships
| Bronze medal – third place | 2001 Belfast | Bantamweight |
Central American and Caribbean Games
| Gold medal – first place | 2002 San Salvador | Featherweight |

Elio Enai Rojas (born September 25, 1982) is a Dominican Republican professional boxer.

== Amateur Highlights ==
1999- Gold Medal in the Battle of Carabobo and Cheo Aponte Tournament.

Elio Rojas solidified his status as a World Class Boxer in 2000 by winning four gold medals in international tournaments.

2001 to 2002:

- Gold Medalist Champion of the Independence Cup in Santo Domingo
- Gold Medalist PanAmerican Tournament at 118
- Champion of Central America Champion at 122
- Com of the Olympic festival in Mexico
- Champion of the International Cup Romana
- World Championships Bronze Medalist in Belfast in Northern Ireland

== Professional career ==
Rojas turned professional in 2004 and scored 19 straight victories to start his career.

On September 13, 2008, Rojas defeated Hector Velasquez in a WBC challenger elimination bout.

On July 14, 2009, Rojas traveled to Japan to fight Takahiro Aho, the WBC featherweight champion. Rojas won the WBC Featherweight Title with a unanimous decision.

Rojas signed to unify the featherweight title in 2010 only to injure his hand prior to the fight.

Rojas faced Mexican boxer Jhonny Gonzales, to regain the WBC Featherweight title but lost via unanimous decision.

== Professional boxing record ==
| 27 fights | 24 wins | 3 losses |
|---|---|---|
| By knockout | 14 | 1 |
| By decision | 10 | 2 |

| No. | Result | Record | Opponent | Type | Round, time | Date | Location | Notes |
|---|---|---|---|---|---|---|---|---|
| 27 | Loss | 24-3 | (United States) Mikey Garcia | TKO | 5 (10) | 30 Jul 2016 | (United States) Barclays Center, Brooklyn | |
| 26 | Win | 24-2 | (Nigeria) Robert Osiobe | UD | 8 (8) | 2014-08-13 | (United States) BB King Blues Club & Grill, New York | |
| 25 | Loss | 23-2 | (Mexico) Jhonny González | UD | 12 (12) | 2012-04-28 | (Mexico) Grand Oasis Arena, Cancun | For WBC Featherweight title |
| 24 | Win | 23-1 | (Mexico) Arturo Gómez | TKO | 8 (10) | 2011-09-16 | (Dominican Republic) Polideportivo, San Francisco de Macoris | |
| 23 | Win | 22-1 | (Mexico) Guty Espadas Jr. | UD | 12 (12) | 2010-02-20 | (Mexico) Polyforum Zam Ná, Merida | Retained WBC Featherweight title |
| 22 | Win | 21-1 | (Japan) Takahiro Ao | UD | 12 (12) | 2009-07-14 | (Japan) Korakuen Hall, Bunkyō | Won WBC Featherweight title |
| 21 | Win | 20-1 | (Mexico) Héctor Velázquez | UD | 12 (12) | 2008-09-13 | (United States) Beau Rivage Resort & Casino, Biloxi | |
| 20 | Loss | 19–1 | (Mexico) Gamaliel Díaz | SD | 10 (10) | 2007-07-13 | (Mexico) Auditorio Centenario, Gomez Palacio | |
| 19 | Win | 19–0 | (United States) Johnnie Edwards | UD | 10 (10) | 2007-03-02 | (United States) Belterra Casino Resort & Spa, Belterra | |
| 18 | Win | 18–0 | (Colombia) Luis Bolano | UD | 8 (8) | 2006-11-04 | (United States) Chase Field, Phoenix | |
| 17 | Win | 17–0 | (Dominican Republic) Luis Antonio Guzman | KO | 3 (8) | 2006-09-24 | (Dominican Republic) Club Paraíso, Santo Domingo | |
| 16 | Win | 16–0 | (United States) Frankie Martinez | KO | 2 (8) | 2006-05-06 | (United States) DCU Center, Worcester | |
| 15 | Win | 15–0 | (United States) Priest Smalls | TKO | 1 (8) | 2006-01-07 | (United States) Madison Square Garden, New York | |
| 14 | Win | 14–0 | (United States) Marty Robbins | UD | 4 (4) | 2005-09-03 | (United States) Gund Arena, Cleveland | |
| 13 | Win | 13–0 | (Dominican Republic) Dionisio Rodriguez | TKO | 2 (8) | 2005-06-18 | (Dominican Republic) Santiago de los Caballeros | |
| 12 | Win | 12–0 | (Nicaragua) Anthony Martinez | UD | 6 (6) | 2005-04-30 | (United States) Madison Square Garden, New York | |
| 11 | Win | 11-0 | (United States) Angelo Luis Torres | UD | 6 (6) | 2005-04-02 | (United States) DCU Center, Worcester | |
| 10 | Win | 10–0 | (United States) Yamin Mohammad | TKO | 3 (4) | Feb 5, 2005 | (United States) Savvis Center, Saint Louis | |
| 9 | Win | 9–0 | (Dominican Republic) Elvis Luciano Martinez | TKO | 2 (6) | 2004-12-17 | (Dominican Republic) Palacio de los Deportes, Santiago de los Caballeros | |
| 8 | Win | 8–0 | (Dominican Republic) Francisco Melendez | TKO | 3 (6) | 2004-12-11 | (Dominican Republic) San Pedro de Macoris | |
| 7 | Win | 7–0 | (Dominican Republic) Cristian Martinez | KO | 1 (6) | 2004-11-20 | (Dominican Republic) Coliseo Pepe Mayen, San Pedro de Macoris | |
| 6 | Win | 6–0 | (United States) Corey Goodwin | TKO | 2 (6) | 2004-10-02 | (United States) Madison Square Garden, New York | |
| 5 | Win | 5–0 | (Dominican Republic) Julio Jerez | KO | 2 (6) | 2004-08-22 | (Dominican Republic) Club de Villa Consuelo, Santo Domingo | |
| 4 | Win | 4–0 | (Dominican Republic) Felipe Jorge | TKO | 3 (6) | 2004-07-16 | (Dominican Republic) Coliseo Carlos 'Teo' Cruz, Santo Domingo | |
| 3 | Win | 3–0 | (Puerto Rico) Ivan Cordero | TKO | 1 (4) | 2004-05-14 | (United States) Orion Palace, Brooklyn | |
| 2 | Win | 2–0 | (Puerto Rico) Luis Antonio Lopez | UD | 4 (4) | 2004-05-07 | (United States) Foxwoods Resort Casino, Mashantucket | |
| 1 | Win | 1–0 | (United States) Wilson Ramos | TKO | 1 (4) | 2004-03-19 | (United States) Olympic Theater, New York | |

== See also ==
- List of world featherweight boxing champions

Sporting positions
World boxing titles
| Preceded by Takahiro Ao | WBC Featherweight champion July 14, 2009 – September 27, 2010; Status changed | Vacant Title next held by Hozumi Hasegawa |
Honorary boxing titles
| New title | WBC Featherweight champion Champion in recess September 27, 2010 – April 28, 2012; Failed to regain title | Vacant |
