= Antonio Margarito vs. Roberto García =

Boxing match

Latin Fury 14
- Date: May 8, 2010
- Venue: Plaza de Toros Monumental de Aguascalientes, Aguascalientes, Aguascalientes, Mexico
- Title(s) on the line: vacant WBC International light middleweight title

Tale of the tape
Boxer	(Mexico) Antonio Margarito	(Mexico) Roberto García
Nickname	"Tornado de Tijuana"	"La Amenaza"
Hometown	Torrance, California, U.S.	Reynosa, Tamaulipas, Mexico
Pre-fight record	37–6–1 (27 KO)	28–2–1 (21 KO)
Age	32 years, 1 month	30 years, 1 month
Height	5 ft 11 in (180 cm)	5 ft 10 in (178 cm)
Weight	154 lb (70 kg)	153 lb (69 kg)
Style	Orthodox	Orthodox
Recognition	WBC; No. 2 Ranked Light Middleweight; 3-division world champion	Former IBA Continental Americas welterweight champion

Result
- Margarito defeats García by unanimous decision

Antonio Margarito vs. Roberto García, billed as Latin Fury 14, was a professional boxing match contested on May 8, 2010, for the WBC International light middleweight championship.

== Background ==
The fight took place at La Feria de San Marcos, in Aguascalientes, Mexico under the promotion of Top Rank. It was contested at 154 pounds, with the vacant international WBC light middleweight championship on the line.

== The fight ==
Margarito won the contest with a unanimous decision of 99–89, 100–88, 99–90.

== Undercard ==
Confirmed bouts:

- (Mexico) Jorge Solis defeated (Puerto Rico) Mario Santiago for the interim WBA World super featherweight title.
- (United States) Mikey Garcia defeated (Mexico) Pedro Navarrete for USBA featherweight title.
- (Nicaragua) Rene Gonzalez vs (United States) Urbano Antillón for WBA lightweight eliminator .
- (Mexico) Salvador Carreon vs (Mexico) Juan Jesus Rivera
- (Nicaragua) Marlon Aguilar vs (Philippines) Michael Farenas
- (Mexico) Enrique Bernache vs (Mexico) Arturo Delgado
- (Mexico) Diego Rivera vs (Mexico) Ricardo Cummings
- (Mexico) Gilberto Flores Hernandez vs (Mexico) Yosmani Abreu
- (United States) José Benavidez Jr. vs (Mexico) Arnoldo Pacheco
- (Mexico) Hanzel Martinez vs (Mexico) Rene Trujillo

== Broadcasting ==
Country	Broadcaster
Mexico	Azteca

Preceded by vs. Shane Mosley	Antonio Margarito's bouts 8 May 2010	Succeeded by vs. Manny Pacquiao
Preceded by vs. Jose Medina	Roberto García's bouts 8 May 2010	Succeeded by vs. Jose Flores
