= RockOpera Praha =

Theatre in Prague, Czechia

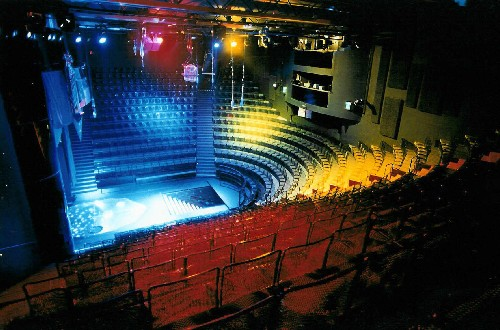
- RockOpera Praha interior

- RockOpera Praha
- Address: Komunardů 306/1, Holešovice; Prague; Czech Republic
- Coordinates: 50.098391°N 14.445531°E
- Owner: Prague
- Capacity: 900
- Type: Auditorium

Construction
- Opened: 1999
- Architect: Jaromír Pizinger

Website
- Official website

RockOpera Praha is a music theatre in Prague, Czech Republic. It has one of the largest auditoriums in the capital, with over 900 seats, and has staged many popular musicals, as well as a whole array of cultural events.
