= Lee Jae-sung (boxer) =

South Korean boxer

Jae-Sung Lee (born April 9, 1983 in Seoul, South Korea) is a South Korean professional boxer in the Featherweight division and is the former Korean National Super Bantamweight Champion.

== Pro career ==
On October 7, 2006 Lee beat the veteran Min-Sung Lee to win the Korean National Super Bantamweight Championship.

In May 2009, Jae-Sung lost to an undefeated Mikey Garcia.

In 2011 Jae-Sung scored a major international victory by defeating Japan's Akihiro Matsumoto in just 70 seconds.

Jae-Sung scored his most notable victory in 2014 when he defeated a badly cut Takuya Watanabe in a 12-round decision. The bout, described as a "blood bath" saw Jae-Sung having his shorts covered in blood. In the fight following the Watanabe fight Jae-Sung will travel to Japan to fight Shingo Wake for the OPBF Featherweight title.
