= Pacquiao (disambiguation) =

Manny Pacquiao (born 1978) is a Filipino professional boxer and politician.

Pacquiao may also refer to:

- Pacquiao: The Movie, 2006 action-drama film based on a true story of Filipino boxer Manny Pacquiao
- Bobby Pacquiao (born 1980), Filipino boxer and politician, brother of Manny Pacquiao
- Rogelio "Ruel" Pacquiao, Filipino politician and incumbent governor of Sarangani, brother of Manny Pacquiao
- Jinkee Pacquiao (née Jamora; born 1979), former vice governor of Sarangani, wife of Manny Pacquiao
- Eman Bacosa Pacquiao (born 2004), Filipino boxer, son of Manny Pacquiao
