= OFW Family Club =

- — Philippine partylist —
- President: Roy Señeres Jr.
- Sector(s) represented: Migrant workers overseas and their relatives
- Founder: Roy Señeres
- Founded: June 1, 2000; 26 years ago
- Slogan: Saklolo sa OFWs, Kalinga sa Pamilya

The OFW Family Club, Inc. is a political organization with party-list representation in the House of Representatives of the Philippines. It aims to represents the interests of Overseas Filipino Workers (OFWs).

== Background ==
The OFW Family Club has been providing aid to Overseas Filipino Workers (OFWs) and their families since 1998. It was established as a non-governmental organization on June 1, 2000, by former diplomat Roy Señeres, his family and volunteers. Señeres' son Roy Jr. was named the inaugural president of the organization.

In the 2013 election, the group vied for party-list representation in the House of Representatives where it won two seats. The first seat was filled by Roy Señeres. However the assumption of former actor Johnny Revilla was delayed over questions about his citizenship status. He eventually took office in August 2013.

The organization loss its seats after failing to garner enough votes in the 2016 elections.

In the 2019 elections, OFW Family Club won back a seat. Bobby Pacquiao, brother of senator and professional boxer Manny Pacquiao, filled in the seat. In the 18th Congress, the House of Representatives passed a bill proposed the creation of the Department of Migrant Workers which eventually became law. The OFW Family Club is one of its principal authors.

OFW Family Club took part in the 2022 elections It called for the abolition of the kafala system in the Middle East which it condemned as exploitative to Filipino domestic workers. The group failed to win a single seat.

== Electoral performance ==
Election	Votes	%	Party-list seats
2013	752,229	2.72%	2 / 56
2016	203,767	0.63%	0 / 59
2019	200,881	0.72%	1 / 61
2022	93,059	0.25%	0 / 63

== Representatives to Congress ==
Period	1st representative	2nd representative
16th Congress; 2013–2016	Roy Señeres	Johnny Revilla (from August 2013 (Note: Took office on August 2013. His assumption in office was delayed over questions over his citizenship status.))
17th Congress; 2016–2019	Out of Congress	
18th Congress; 2019–2022	Bobby Pacquiao	—N/a
Note: A party-list group, can win a maximum of three seats in the House of Representatives.
