= Kid Kulafu =

2015 sports drama film by Paul Soriano

- Theatrical release poster
- Directed by: Paul Soriano
- Screenplay by: Froilan Medina
- Story by: Paul Soriano; Manny Pacquiao; Froilan Medina
- Produced by: Charo Santos-Concio; Malou N. Santos; Paul Soriano; Evangeline del Rosario
- Starring: Robert Villar; Cesar Montano; Khalil Ramos; Alessandra de Rossi; Alex Medina
- Cinematography: Odyssey Flores
- Edited by: Mark Victor
- Music by: Robbie Factoran; Ricardo Jugo; Mark Villar
- Production companies: Star Cinema; Ten17P
- Distributed by: ABS-CBN Film Productions; Solar Pictures
- Release date: April 15, 2015
- Running time: 111 minutes
- Country: Philippines
- Language: Filipino

Kid Kulafu is a 2015 Filipino biographical sports drama film produced and released by Star Cinema together with Ten17P owned by the film's director Paul Soriano. The film dramatizes the life of the boxing superstar Manny Pacquiao during his childhood. It stars Buboy Villar, Alessandra De Rossi and Cesar Montano.

Kid Kulafu was the second biopic of Pacquiao 9 years after Pacquiao: The Movie, which had focused on his early career as a boxer and stardom.

== Plot ==
Kid Kulafu as early life boxing of Emmanuel "Manny" Pacquiao or Kid Kulafu. Before he became one of the world's greatest boxers Manny Pacquiao was a young boy living a hand-to-mouth existence, trying to survive from one day to the next. When he discovers his natural talent for boxing, he embarks on a brutal and intense journey that takes him from the mountains of the Philippines to the streets of Manila, and must risk everything to become a champion - for himself, his family, and his country.

== Cast ==
- Robert Villar as Emmanuel "Manny" Pacquiao
- Alessandra de Rossi as Dionisia Pacquiao
- Cesar Montano as Sardo Mejia
- Khalil Ramos as Eugene Barutag
- Jay Manalo as Boy Kidlat
- Jake Macapagal as Dizon
- Jomari Angeles as Abner
- Igi Boy Flores as Baste
- Kokoy De Santos as Robert
- Jak Roberto as Fred
- Alex Medina as Rosalio Pacquiao
- Amante Pulido as NPA Commander
- Iris Sanchez as Isidra
- Nino Jobert Bayungan as Bobby
- Patrick Carrera as Ruel
- Lou Veloso as Mang Polding
- Garry Lim as Mang Boy
- Archie Adamos as Mang Ising
- Efren Reyes as Mang Ben
- Jess Evardone as Boxing Promoter
- Lito Cadule as Mang Dado
- Mel Kimura as Mrs Farcon
- Ruby Ruiz as the Midwife
- Emma Galvez as Manang Biday
- Antonette Garcia as Marie
- Flor Salanga as Miss Remy
- Joseph Mercado as Leonard Rodrigo
- Alwin Lasutan as Rustico Torrecampo

== Production ==
=== Background and pre-production ===
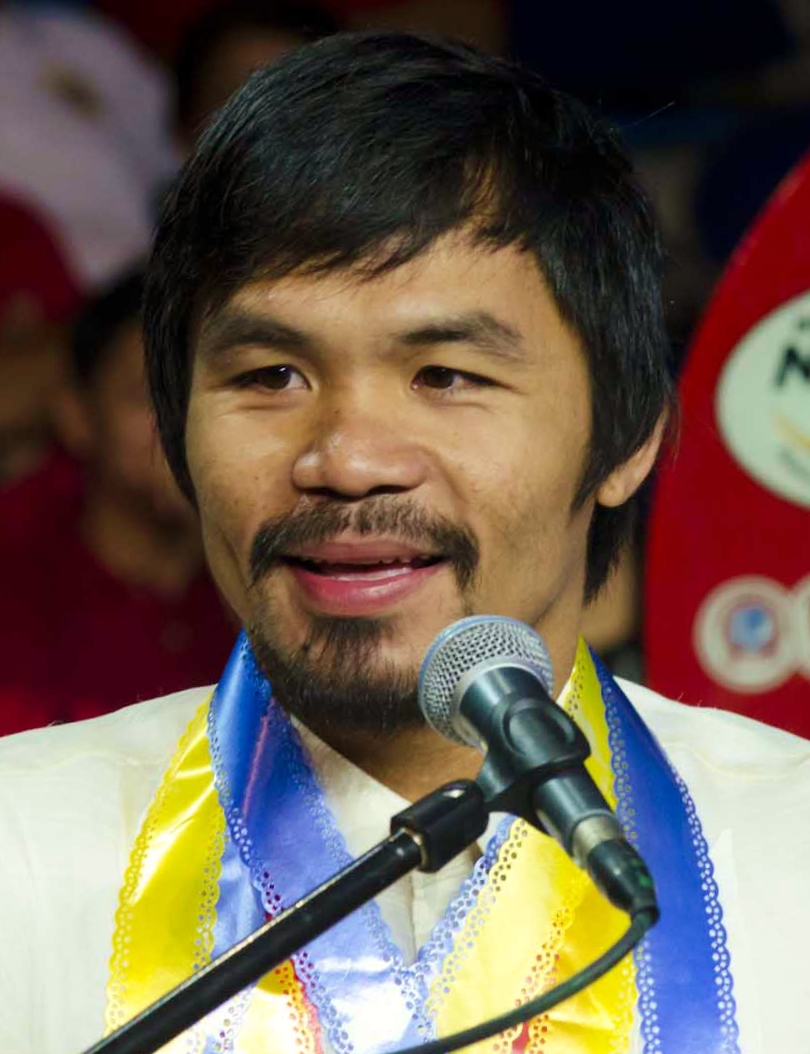
Pacquiao himself served as a producer of the film.

Director Paul Soriano is aware that there has been a movie about the boxing champ which was the 2006 film, Pacquiao: The Movie by Star Cinema. He describes his film as focusing in Pacquiao's "mountain life" and his move from General Santos to Manila and said that the 2006 film focused more on his boxing career. The film which covered the first 15 years of Pacquiao's life, was described by Soriano as a "prequel" to Pacquiao's "championship life".

Froilan Medina was the writer of the film. Marie Pineda is the producer. The executive producers of the film are Malou N. Santos, Charo Santos-Concio, Evangeline Del Rosario, and director Soriano. The supervising producers are Jaime de los Angeles and Erwin Blanco. The film's production design was done by Joey Luna. Mark Victor was the film's editor.

For the sound and music, the composers of were Robbie Factoran, Ricardo Jugo, and Mark Villar. The sound designer was Mikko Quizon and sound recordist was Mark Locs.

It took three years to produce the film. Two years were spent in doing research and conducting interviews with Pacquiao and the boxer's relatives, friends and former trainers.

Manny Pacquiao himself assisted in the production of the film although such aid were not financial in nature. Pacquiao went over the film's script and assisted Soriano in facilitating interviews with key people. Pacquiao allowed Soriano creative freedom to depict events on his early life both good and bad. Soriano remarked that the film is 80 percent factual, while clarifying that he did not invent any scenes and only compressed 15 years of the boxer's life into a single film.

=== Casting ===
An audition was held for the role young Manny Pacquiao. Soriano said that the dilemma for the casting for the role of Pacquiao is between getting a boxer and to teach him how to act, or is it to get an actor and to teach him how to box. Robert Villar was eventually chosen to portray Pacquiao. Producer, Marie Pineda said that Villar was chosen for the role, for his acting skills, his resemblance to Pacquiao, and his ability to mimic the boxer's fighting style and remarked that these characteristics set himself from others who vied for the role.

Villar said that when he was auditioning, the production team kept the true nature of the role secret from him. They said that they were looking for someone to portray the role of a poor boy named Oscar.

=== Fight choreography ===
Erwin Tagle, a mixed martial artists was tasked by Soriano train Robert Villar and Igi Boy Flores, who portrayed Pacquiao and his friend respectively, to "think like fighters and act like fighters". Soriano said that initially Villar and Flores weren't "wired like fighter" adding that when one sees a punch, one's natural instinct is to close one's eyes as one tries to avoid the punch. Soriano also spoke of Villar being "like a sponge" noting that he "absorbed" everything he taught to him while he remarked that the rest of the cast were willing to learn.

Villar spent three months in building muscles and learning how to box in a Southpaw stance for his role as Pacquiao.

Pineda remarked on Alessandra de Rossi's portrayal of Dionisia Pacquiao, the mother of the boxer. The producer comments that de Rossi "was able to capture Manny’s mom’s humor and strong personality without making it too much of a caricature. She was able to balance showing her love for her son while also showing her humorous side,”

=== Filming ===
Ten17P, an independent film company owned by the director, was responsible for shooting the scenes of the film with most of them shot on location. One of the most costly scenes to make were those shot in the mountains-which composed of considerable portions of the whole film. Many scenes were also shot in original locations in General Santos which includes the boxing ring located in the city, where Pacquiao himself fought. Pacquiao himself helped Soriano secure the shooting locations in the city. Shooting in General Santos took about two weeks.

All in all, the shooting of the film took 34 days in a span of three to four months.

== Release ==
Kid Kulafu premiered in Philippine cinemas on April 15, 2015. The film was also first screened in selected cinemas in Canada and the United States on April 24, 2015.

The film was also aired in numerous international film festivals among which was the Guam International Film Festival in August 2015 and the Raindance Film Festival in October 2015.

=== Critical reception ===
==== Accolades ====
Award	Category	Recipient	Result
Guam International Film Festival Awards (2015)	Achievement in Acting	Robert Villar	Won
14th Gawad Tanglaw Awards	Best Production Design	Joey Luna	Won

== See also ==
- Pacquiao: The Movie
- Manny (film)
