= Manny (film) =

2014 documentary film directed by Leon Gast

- Directed by: Leon Gast; Ryan Moore
- Produced by: Jay Bajaj; Ken Mayer; Ryan Moore
- Starring: Manny Pacquiao; Mark Wahlberg; Jeremy Piven; Jimmy Kimmel
- Narrated by: Liam Neeson
- Cinematography: Sjez Thierry
- Edited by: Lenny Mesina
- Music by: Lorne Balfe
- Production companies: Wonderspun; Revelin Studios
- Distributed by: Universal Pictures
- Release dates: March 8, 2014 (United States); March 18, 2015 (Philippines)
- Running time: 88 minutes
- Country: United States
- Language: English

Manny is a 2014 American documentary film that is directed by Leon Gast and Ryan Moore. It covers the life of professional boxer Manny Pacquiao, from his impoverished life as a young boy to his boxing glory and entrance into Philippine politics. The film is narrated by Liam Neeson. Additionally, interviews of friends, family members, and people associated with professional boxing, combined with archival footage of Pacquiao, were used throughout the film. Notable appearances in the film include Oscar De La Hoya, Jimmy Kimmel, Jeremy Piven, and Mark Wahlberg.

== Overview ==
The documentary opens showing the final seconds of his fourth fight against Juan Manuel Márquez, ending with a strong counter right hand from his opponent that knocks Manny Pacquiao unconscious. His fifth, but most devastating loss further places his accomplished boxing career at a crossroads.

Pacquiao briefly recalls his childhood; raised primarily by his mother, growing up with his brothers and sisters in abject poverty in a field located in Kibawe, Bukidnon, Philippines. At an early age, his family witnessed the horrors of war while growing up under martial law. He was introduced to boxing by an uncle, who would enter him in juvenile bouts and would win little money. When he was 14, Pacquiao ran away to Manila and started his tenure in the Philippines national amateur boxing team as a way to provide for his family. After the death of a friend, Pacquiao considers pursuing a career as a professional boxer. By early 2001, Pacquiao carried a record of 32 wins and 2 defeats and has married Jinkee Jamora the year before.

Pacquiao was contacted to be a last minute replacement to fight Lehlohonolo Ledwaba within the next two weeks in, what would be, his first fight that took place in the United States, represented by Murad Muhammad. Freddie Roach reported to have felt a connection with Pacquiao the minute they started doing the focus mitts with power and speed, which cemented their famed relationship. Until his loss against Érik Morales, Roach was not satisfied with his pupil depending on his famous southpaw stance, which ensues into training Pacquiao using his right hand more, making the necessary adjustment which created his famous fighting style. However, it is revealed that Muhammad had been not paying Pacquiao the amount he truly deserved. After a brief dispute with Golden Boy Promotions, Pacquiao was confirmed to have signed with Top Rank under the legendary promoter Bob Arum. In 2008, Pacquiao was set to fight Oscar De La Hoya in his first match as a welterweight. Through nine rounds De La Hoya could not handle the speed of his opponent, which Pacquiao won by TKO, finally taking place as The Ring's #1 Pound-for-Pound Fighter. His subsequent knockout victories over Ricky Hatton and Miguel Cotto, he became the WBO Welterweight Champion in 2009 by beating the latter, his 7th world title. Pacquiao had obtained the status of an international superstar athlete, gaining endorsements from Nike, HP, Wonderful Pistachios, etc. and starring in films such as Wapakman and Anak ng Kumander in his native Philippines, and making appearances on Jimmy Kimmel Live! With his status as a superstar, Jinkee fears her husband would go back to his womanizing ways.

After his victory against Joshua Clottey in the spring of 2010, Top Rank arranged for Pacquiao to face the imposing Antonio Margarito for the WBC Light Middleweight Championship. Through twelve grueling rounds, Pacquiao emerged victorious winning his record-breaking 8th world title, making him the first and only Octuple champion in boxing. Following this, Pacquiao did not seek to defend his new title but took time off to pursue his political aspirations in his home province. In 2011, Pacquiao became a congressman of Sarangani, which was met with some criticism to what he focuses on first. In the midst of this, the negotiations to schedule a potential super fight against Floyd Mayweather Jr. for the past three years have faltered out. After his victory against Shane Mosley in the summer, he was scheduled to fight Juan Manuel Marquez for the third time later that year. But in between, Pacquiao became strained with both training and his political work. During the fight, Pacquiao appeared to be less focused, but nonetheless performed well against his longtime adversary. With one of the judges scoring the fight a draw, Pacquiao retained his title by majority decision to which members of the audience voiced their disapproval. Arum is seen telling Marquez that there will be a fourth fight made.

Pacquiao recalled to have had a dream in which he encountered God, who questioned Pacquiao as to why he is distant from him. Upon waking up, he realized that his pillow was soaked, indicating he was crying in his sleep. This opened the conversation with Jinkee that would eventually be one of the biggest changes of his life. Raised as a devoted Roman Catholic throughout his life, he renounced his vices and converted into Evangelical Christianity, being true to the commandments and finally finding balance. In 2012, Pacquiao displayed a spirited performance against the unbeaten Timothy Bradley, however, lost by a controversial split decision. Despite his fourth loss, Pacquiao is seen to be gracious in defeat as he tells his family that it is God's will. From then until that December, Pacquiao devoted his time as a man of faith, family, and people; spreading his testimony to sold-out arenas. The film cuts back to his fourth fight against Marquez. After Pacquiao hit the canvas, the MGM Grand Garden Arena was surrounded in pandemonium, while the Philippines and the rest of the world starred in silence. In a voice-over, Pacquiao states that even through the obstacles, with the talent that God has given him, he will always be "a fighter."

The film closes with an on-screen text that read in 2013, Pacquiao had been re-elected into Congress. In addition, he returned to fighting after an 11-month layoff (against Brandon Ríos) dedicating his victory to the victims of Typhoon Haiyan, and he will continue to fight.

== Release ==
=== Theatrical ===
The film was initially released on March 8, 2014, in the South by Southwest Film Festival. It was also released on May 16, 2014, in the Little Rock Film Festival. It had limited release in the United States on January 23, 2015. In the Philippines, the film was released by Solar Pictures during its Sinag Maynila Film Festival on March 18, 2015, followed by subsequent releases in select cinemas.

=== Home media and streaming ===
The film was released on DVD and Blu-ray by Anchor Bay Entertainment on April 14, 2015.

The film is also streaming on IMDb TV, Crackle, Pluto TV, Amazon Prime Video and Tubi.

== Reception ==
On review aggregator Rotten Tomatoes, the film holds an approval rating of 25% based on 12 reviews, with an average rating of 5.21/10. On Metacritic, the film has a weighted average score of 35 out of 100, based on 7 critics, indicating "generally unfavorable reviews".

== See also ==
- List of boxing films
- Pacquiao: The Movie
- Kid Kulafu
