= Lalaban Ako para sa Pilipino =

EP by Manny Pacquiao
- Released: 24 April 2015
- Recorded: April 2015
- Genres: Pop; OPM
- Length: 4:14
- Label: GMA Records
- Producer: GMA Records

Manny Pacquiao chronology
"Sometimes When We Touch" (2011)	Lalaban Ako para sa Pilipino (2015)	"Theme Pacquiao" (2015)

Lalaban Ako para sa Pilipino (English: I Will Fight for the Filipinos) is an EP by Filipino boxer and politician Manny Pacquiao. It is also the title track of the EP, and his last release after he announced retirement from singing. The EP was released on 24 April 2015 under GMA Records.

It was his entrance song to his fight against Floyd Mayweather Jr., which he lost.

It was written by Filipino composer Lito Camo, who is also a close friend of Pacquiao.

== Music video ==
Pacquiao himself directed the four-minute-and-seventeen-second video. It mostly shows the aftermath of Typhoon Haiyan; scenes from his previous fights, notably against Érik Morales and Juan Manuel Márquez; and videos of Pacquiao hurt during those fights, with blood on his face. It also features Filipinos praying religiously while smiling or crying; Pacquiao training before his fights; and him performing the song in a studio with a crowd cheering him on, singing along with the track and waving the Philippine flag proudly. At the end of the video, Pacquiao closes his eyes slowly, as if to pray.
