= Miguel Cotto vs. Paulie Malignaggi =

- Date: June 10, 2006
- Venue: Madison Square Garden, New York, New York, U.S.
- Title(s) on the line: WBO light welterweight title

Tale of the tape
Boxer	Miguel Cotto	Paulie Malignaggi
Nickname	Junito	The Magic Man
Hometown	Caguas, Puerto Rico	Brooklyn, New York, U.S.
Pre-fight record	26–0 (22 KO)	21–0 (5 KO)
Age	25 years, 7 months	25 years, 6 months
Height	5 ft 8 in (173 cm)	5 ft 8 in (173 cm)
Weight	138 1/4 lb (63 kg)	138 1/4 lb (63 kg)
Style	Orthodox	Orthodox
Recognition	WBO; Light Welterweight Champion; The Ring; No. 1 Ranked Light Welterweight	WBO; No. 10 Ranked Light Welterweight

Result
- Cotto wins via 12-round unanimous decision (116–111, 116–111, 115–112)

Miguel Cotto vs. Paulie Malignaggi was a professional boxing match contested on June 10, 2006, for the WBO light welterweight title.

== Background ==
In February 2006, negotiations for a Miguel Cotto–Paulie Malignaggi WBO light welterweight title fight to take place that June in Madison Square Garden began when Cotto and Malignaggi's respective promoters, Bob Arum and Lou DiBella met in Las Vegas. Both parties expressed optimism that the fight would get down with Arum stating "It will get done. I think it's a great fight and a marketable fight", while DiBella echoed similar sentiments "you have the Puerto Rican star with a big following in New York against the Italian kid from Brooklyn. Good promotion, good fight." The deal was contingent on Cotto first winning his March fight in his native Puerto Rico against Gianluca Branco. Cotto would defeat Branco via eighth-round technical knockout, putting his fight against Malignaggi on.

The event was independently produced on pay-per-view by Arum's company Top Rank. HBO had been in talks with Arum to air the event under their pay-per-view division but HBO passed in favor of the Antonio Tarver–Bernard Hopkins fight which was taking place on the same June 10 date. HBO made Arum an offer to broadcast the fight one day earlier on June 9, but Arum declined as he wanted to keep the June 10 date as it was the day before New York City's Puerto Rican Day Parade.

== Fight Details ==
Cotto got off to a great start as he opened up a cut above Malignaggi's left eye in the first round and then scored the fight's only knockdown in the second, dropping Malignaggi with a left hook. Though Malignaggi was able to get back to his feet and continue the fight, the blow broke his jaw and his right orbital bone, causing the right side of his face to swell. Malignaggi would rebound and stayed in the fight by winning several rounds thereafter using his speed and jab. However, the cut above his right eye got progressively worse as the fight went on and the ringside physician was asked to check the wound before the start of the eighth round but allowed Malignaggi to continue. Though Malignaggi got through the remainder of the fight, Cotto would continue to land big shots and by the 11th round, both Malignaggi's eye and nose were bleeding.

In what was a hard fought contest, Cotto defeated Malignaggi by a relatively close unanimous decision with two scores of 116–111 and one of 115–112.

== Aftermath ==
Following the fight, Malignaggi would be immediately rushed to the hospital with DiBella announcing soon after that Malignaggi would not fight for the remainder of the year due to his injuries.

== Fight card ==
Confirmed bouts:

Weight Class	Weight		vs.		Method	Round	Notes
Light Welterweight	140 lbs.	Miguel Cotto (c)	def.	Paulie Malignaggi	UD	12	^{note 1}
Super Featherweight	130 lbs.	Bobby Pacquiao (c)	def.	Kevin Kelley	KO	4/12	^{note 2}
Middleweight	160 lbs.	John Duddy (c)	def.	Alfredo Cuevas	RTD	7/12	^{note 3}
Super Bantamweight	122 lbs.	Juan Manuel López	def.	Sergio Mendez	UD	6
Welterweight	147 lbs.	Julio César Chávez Jr.	def.	Aaron Drake	TKO	2/6
Light Heavyweight	175 lbs.	Curtis Stevens	def.	Eric Howard	TKO	6/6
Super Middleweight	168 lbs.	Peter Quillin	def.	Eddie O'Neal	KO	1/4
Bantamweight	118 lbs.	Noriko Kariya	def.	Kerri Hill	TKO	3/4x2

^Note 1 For WBO Light Welterweight Title
^Note 2 For WBC Continental Americas Super Featherweight Title
^Note 3 For WBC Continental Americas Middleweight Title

== Broadcasting ==
Country	Broadcaster
United States	Top Rank Pay-Per-View

Preceded by vs. Gianluca Branco	Miguel Cotto's bouts 10 June 2006	Succeeded by vs. Carlos Quintana
Preceded by vs. Donald Camarena	Paulie Malignaggi's bouts 10 June 2006	Succeeded by vs. Edner Cherry
