= Audie Attar =

Iraqi-American sports manager (born 1980)

Audie A. Attar
- Born: September 13, 1980 (age 46); Baghdad, Iraq
- Education: University of California, Los Angeles, Pepperdine University
- Occupation: Founder of Paradigm Sports Management
- Children: 2

Audie A. Attar (born September 13, 1980) is an Iraqi-American sports manager and founder of Paradigm Sports Management. He is best known for managing Conor McGregor.

== Early life and education ==
In 1980, Attar was born in Baghdad, Iraq. He immigrated to the United States with his parents when he was two years old, settling in Claremont, California. Attar would play football while attending Claremont High School, and would later be inducted into the school's Hall of Fame.

Attar would go on to attend UCLA, majoring in sociology. He once contended for a starting position on the Bruins as a linebacker, but was dismissed from the team after an altercation at a bar in his senior season, which began after a patron made an anti-Islamic remark. He later obtained a master's degree in business administration and a letter in dispute resolution from Pepperdine University.

== Career ==
After working as an associate for several agencies, in 2009, Attar founded Paradigm Sports Management with Gambino family associate Michael Abul. Early on, he signed UFC fighters Michael Bisping, Conor McGregor, Chris Weidman and Stephen Thompson as clients, while also working with some NFL and MLB players.

In 2018, Attar became a minority partner of Proper Twelve, a whiskey producer founded by Conor McGregor.

=== Manny Pacquiao litigation ===
In 2020, Attar began representing boxer Manny Pacquiao as part of Paradigm's roster of athletes. Pacquiao was later sued by Attar for breach of contract, alleging that associates of Pacquiao influenced him to return to boxing manager Al Haymon, who signed Pacquiao to fight Errol Spence Jr. for the welterweight title, which violated Paradigm's exclusive rights to promote Pacquiao's fights. At the time, Attar was negotiating for Pacquiao to fight Mikey Garcia. Attar sought to recoup a $3.3 million advance given to Pacquiao and requested an injunction to stop the fight. The injunction was denied. Paradigm took on $20 million in damages as a result of the contractual breach. The court ruled in favor of Paradigm, ordering Pacquiao to pay $5.1 million to the company. The total amount of the judgment was $3.3 million in actual damages, recouping the advance paid to Pacquiao by Paradigm, as well as $1.8 million in punitive damages.

In August 2024, the verdict was overturned and vacated. The court found evidence, that when signing the contract to represent Pacquiao, Attar did not hold a management license, which is required under California law.

== Personal life ==
Los Angeles Times described Attar as "an avowed Muslim who abhors violence". He married his wife in 2003 and has two daughters.

Attar's father, Al, immigrated to the United States in the 1950s. After immigrating, he learned English and eventually earned two undergraduate degrees and two master's degrees. His father would move back to the Middle East to start a business, although moved back to America after Audie Attar was born. In 1991, Attar was visiting relatives in Iraq when the Gulf War began. He safely returned to the United States.

Attar's brother, Eddie, was murdered when Attar was a sophomore at Claremont High School. In his memory, Attar had Eddie's name tattooed on his shoulder in Arabic.
