= Pacquiao: The Movie =

2006 Filipino action-drama film based

- Theatrical Release Poster
- Directed by: Joel C. Lamangan
- Written by: Roy Iglesias
- Produced by: Charo Santos-Concio; Malou N. Santos; Rose L. Flaminiano; Manny Pacquiao
- Starring: Jericho Rosales; Bea Alonzo
- Cinematography: Romeo Vitug
- Edited by: Marya Ignacio
- Music by: Jessie Lasaten
- Production companies: Star Cinema; FLT Films
- Distributed by: Star Cinema
- Release date: June 21, 2006
- Running time: 109 minutes
- Country: Philippines
- Language: Filipino

Pacquiao: The Movie is a 2006 Philippine biographical sports drama film directed by Joel C. Lamangan. The film stars Jericho Rosales as the title role. The film is based on a true story of Filipino boxer Emmanuel "Manny" Pacquiao. The film was shot in General Santos, Manila, Las Vegas, Nevada and Los Angeles, California.

This is FLT Films' only film after a 3-year hiatus, which in turn would be the last film produced. With the film being a box-office bomb, plans of a two-picture contract for Pacquiao didn't push through.

Pacquiao: The Movie would be followed 9 years later by Kid Kulafu, which focuses on the boxer's early years as a childhood and youth.

== Plot ==
The film starts with the opening credits with clips from the first fight between Manny Pacquiao and Érik Morales. After which, it started when a beaten Manny (Jericho Rosales) depressed upon his defeat to Morales. He was with his trainer Buboy Fernandez (Bayani Agbayani) and his wife Jinkee (Bea Alonzo). After that, the scene flashes back to a young Manny (Jiro Manio) being experienced as a boxer in General Santos. It comes back to the present time when Manny was hospitalized. It comes back to his childhood with his strict mother Dionesia (Jaclyn Jose) whose having a misunderstanding with her husband Rosalio (Tirso Cruz III) and he started his training as a young boxer. Then it goes back to the time when Manny is planning to go back to the Philippines.

After that it flashes back to Manny as a boxer, there he met Nanay Parcon (Gloria Sevilla), a recruiter of young boxers and Emong Dionisio (Jay Manalo). Her mother disagrees with Manny's decision to be a boxer because he is too young. After that, it comes back to the present time, when Manny and his team arrived in the Philippines. It flashes back again when he went to Manila to be a boxer. He lived in a gym in Malabon owned by Polding Correa (Ricky Davao). Emong saw Manny and began his dream as a boxer. He worked in a construction and selling sampaguita. It goes back when he arrived at his home with his family greeting him even though he lost. It flashes back when Manny began his journey as a boxer. At seventeen years old, he became a professional, and he was undefeated at that time. He was handled eventually by Ruben Novales (Tony Mabesa). He arrived at General Santos and hired Buboy Fernandez, his close friend as his trainer. There he learned that her parents were separated. His undefeated streak ended when he was knocked-out by Rustico Torrecampo. There, his close friend Eugene Barutag (Biboy Ramirez) collapsed and died after a grueling fight.

In present time, he learned also that Emong is using Manny's name for his ventures. Emong is now poor, and it flashes back when he was a boxer, he was hit by a car and was hospitalized. In a mall, he met Jinkee Jamora. Jinkee had a twin sister, Janet but her mother is confused about Manny. Manny and Jinkee married in a civil wedding. Dionesia disagrees with his wife. In Thailand, Manny is the Flyweight champion, he lost to Medgoen Singsurat. There, he became addicted to drugs and became a womanizer. After that, he changed and never used drugs again. Manny's victories became a hit. One of which when he won over Marco Antonio Barrera. However, Jinkee learned that he had a child out-of-wedlock. The scene goes back upon the controversial fight between Pacquiao and Morales. In the end, the two had their rematch where Manny won via a 10-Round Technical Knock-Out. The movie ended when Manny was given a Hero's Welcome and some clips of the real Pacquiao and his motorcade.

== Cast and characters ==
- Jericho Rosales as Manny Pacquiao
- Bea Alonzo as Jinkee Jamora-Pacquiao / Janet Jamora
- Jay Manalo as Emong "Kidlat" Dionisio
- Bayani Agbayani as Buboy Fernandez
- Glaiza de Castro as Cecille Correa
- Andrea del Rosario as Joana Bacosa
- Polo Ravales as Bobby Pacquiao
- Tirso Cruz III as Rosalio Pacquiao (Manny's Father)
- Jaclyn Jose as Dionesia Pacquiao (Manny's Mother)
- Jiro Manio as Young Manny
- Zoren Legaspi as Business Associate Eric Pineda
- Ricky Davao as Polding Correa
- Gloria Sevilla as Nanay Parcon
- Dimples Romana as Lourdes
- Jim Pebanco as Bayani Ocampo
- Tony Mabesa as Ruben Novales
- Mon Confiado as Rico Antonio
- Rey Danseco as the boxing commentator at ringside
- Biboy Ramirez as Eugene Barotag
- Gabb Drilon as Rogelio
- Richard Quan as Sardo Mejia (Manny's Uncle)
- Czarina Dela Peña as Isidra
- Pinky Amador as Jinkee / Janet's Mother
- Emil Sandoval as Jinkee / Janet's Father
- Freddie Roach as American Trainer
- Ali Atienza as Manila Mayor Lito Atienza

== See also ==
- List of boxing films
- Manny (film)
- Kid Kulafu
