= Jinkee Pacquiao =

Filipina politician (born 1979)

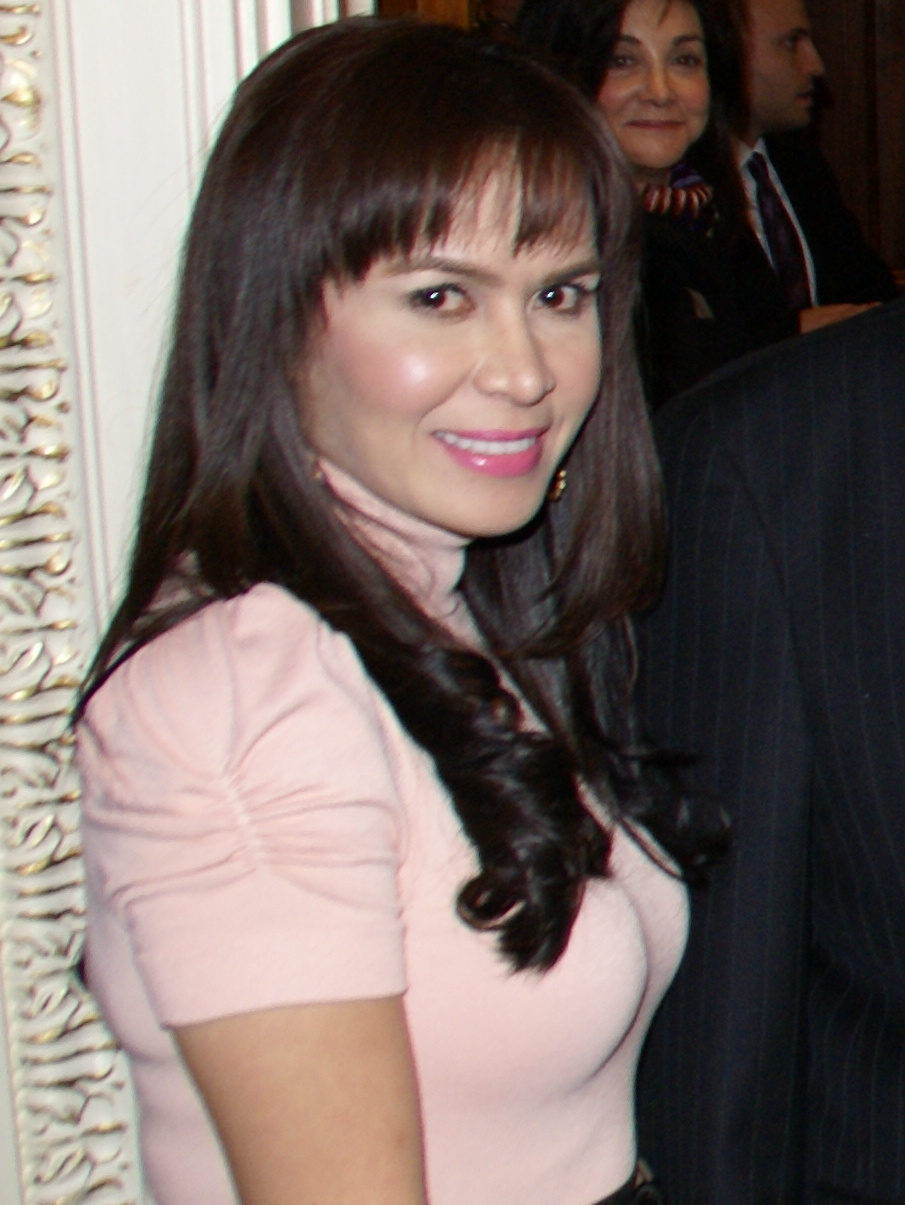
- Pacquiao in 2011

Vice Governor of Sarangani
- In office June 30, 2013 – June 30, 2016
- Governor: Steve Solon
- Preceded by: Steve Solon
- Succeeded by: Elmer De Peralta

Personal details
- Born: Jinkee Capeña Jamora; January 12, 1979 (age 47) General Santos, South Cotabato, Philippines
- Party: UNA (2012–2016); PCM (2012–2016)
- Spouse: Manny Pacquiao (m. 1999)
- Children: 5
- Relatives: Bobby Pacquiao (brother-in-law)
- Education: AMA Computer University

Jinkee Capeña Jamora-Pacquiao (born January 12, 1979), more known as Jinkee Pacquiao, is a Filipina socialite, media personality, film producer, former politician who served as a vice governor of Sarangani, Mindanao, Philippines from 2013 to 2016. She is well known as the wife of professional Filipino boxer and Senator Manny Pacquiao. She also had a brief career in the film industry as a producer for her husband's documentaries and for several box-office titles.

== Early life ==
Jinkee Jamora was born in General Santos on January 12, 1979 to Nestor Jamora (born c. 1956, Kiamba, Sarangani) and Rosalina Capeña (born c. 1957, Silago, Southern Leyte).

== Political career ==
In 2013, Pacquiao decided to run for vice governor of Sarangani province in Mindanao, after her husband was reluctant to choose between two friends who both wanted his support for the position. She was elected in the May 2013 election as the candidate of the United Nationalist Alliance.

After her first and only term, Jinkee decided to retire from politics to focus on their family and her businesses.

== Personal life ==
She was working as a shop assistant when she met Manny Pacquiao, whom she married in 1999. They have five children.

== In popular culture ==
- Portrayed by Bea Alonzo in Pacquiao: The Movie (2006)
