= Manny Pacquiao =

Filipino boxer and politician (born 1978)

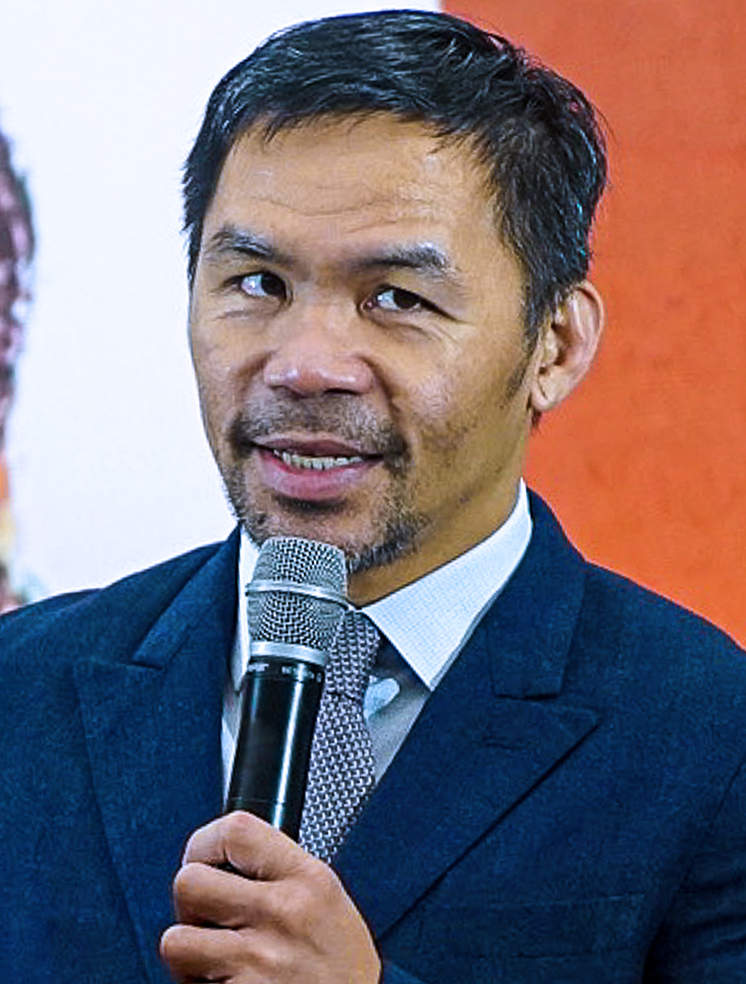
- Pacquiao in 2025

Secretary and Lead Convenor of the National Anti-Poverty Commission
- Incumbent
- Assumed office September 8, 2026
- President: Bongbong Marcos
- Preceded by: Lope B. Santos III

Senator of the Philippines
- In office June 30, 2016 – June 30, 2022

Chair of the Senate Ethics and Privileges Committee
- In office September 18, 2018 – June 30, 2022
- Preceded by: Tito Sotto
- Succeeded by: Nancy Binay

Chair of the Senate Public Works Committee
- In office July 25, 2016 – June 30, 2022
- Preceded by: Bongbong Marcos
- Succeeded by: Bong Revilla

Member of the Philippine House of Representatives from Sarangani's at-large congressional district
- In office June 30, 2010 – June 30, 2016
- Preceded by: Erwin Chiongbian
- Succeeded by: Rogelio Pacquiao

Personal details
- Born: Emmanuel Dapidran Pacquiao; December 17, 1978 (age 47) Kibawe, Bukidnon, Philippines
- Party: PFP (2024–present); PCM (local party; 2009–present)
- Other political affiliations: See list: PROMDI (2021–2024); PDP (2016–2021); UNA (2012–2016); Nacionalista (2009–2010); Lakas–Kampi (2008–2009); KAMPI (2007–2008); Liberal (until 2007; 2010–2012)
- Spouse: Jinkee Jamora (m. 1999)
- Children: 6, including Eman
- Relatives: Bobby Pacquiao (brother); Ruel Pacquiao (brother)
- Education: Notre Dame of Dadiangas University (no degree); University of Makati (BA); Philippine Christian University (MPA)
- Website: Senate website

Military service
- Allegiance: Philippines
- Branch/service: Philippine Army
- Years of service: 2006–present
- Rank: Colonel (reserve)
- Boxing career
- Nickname: PacMan
- Height: 5 ft 5 in (165 cm)
- Weight class: List: Light flyweight; Flyweight; Super bantamweight; Featherweight; Super featherweight; Lightweight; Light welterweight; Welterweight; Light middleweight
- Reach: 67 in (170 cm)
- Stance: Southpaw

Boxing record
- Total fights: 73
- Wins: 62
- Win by KO: 39
- Losses: 8
- Draws: 3

Emmanuel Dapidran Pacquiao Sr. (/ˈpækiaʊ/ PAK-ee-ow; locally [ˈmanɪ pɐkˈjaʊ]; born December 17, 1978) is a Filipino professional boxer and former politician. Nicknamed "PacMan", he is widely regarded as one of the greatest professional boxers of all time, becoming the only eight-division world champion in boxing history. He also served as a senator of the Philippines from 2016 to 2022.

Pacquiao has won twelve major world titles overall. He won the lineal championship in four different weight classes (flyweight, featherweight, super featherweight, light welterweight). Pacquiao is the first boxer to win major world titles in four of the eight "glamour divisions" (flyweight, featherweight, lightweight, and welterweight), and is the only boxer to hold world championships across four decades (1990s, 2000s, 2010s, and 2020s).

In July 2019, Pacquiao became the oldest welterweight world champion in history at the age of 40, and the first boxer in history to become a recognized four-time welterweight champion, after defeating Keith Thurman to win the WBA (Super) welterweight title. As of 2015, Pacquiao's fights had generated $1.2 billion in revenue from his 25 pay-per-view bouts.

Forbes ranked him the second highest paid athlete in the world in 2012 and 2015, and the eighth highest paid athlete of the 2010s. In 2024, ESPN ranked Pacquiao as the greatest Asian athlete of the 21st century. In 2025, The Ring ranked Pacquiao second among the greatest pound-for-pound fighters of the 21st century. He was inducted into the International Boxing Hall of Fame in the class of 2025.

Pacquiao entered politics in 2010 when he was elected as the representative of Sarangani. He held this post for six years until he was elected and assumed office as a senator in 2016. He became the leader of the (at that time ruling) PDP–Laban party in 2020 (which is disputed since 2021).

On September 19, 2021, Pacquiao officially declared his candidacy for President of the Philippines in the 2022 Philippine presidential election; he ended up losing to Bongbong Marcos. Following his unsuccessful campaign in the 2025 Senate election, he announced his intention to retire from politics and come out of retirement from boxing. In 2026, President Marcos appointed Pacquiao as the secretary of the National Anti-Poverty Commission.

Outside of boxing and politics, Pacquiao was the player-coach for the Philippine Basketball Association (PBA) team Kia/Mahindra for three seasons from 2014 to 2017, before founding the semi-professional Maharlika Pilipinas Basketball League.

He has also starred in films and has presented television shows. In music, he has released multiple PARI-certified platinum albums and songs; his cover of "Sometimes When We Touch" peaked at 19 in the United States on Billboard's Adult Contemporary chart after a performance on Jimmy Kimmel Live! He is an Evangelical Christian preacher, philanthropist, and entrepreneur.

== Early life and education ==
Manny Pacquiao was born as Emmanuel Dapidran Pacquiao on December 17, 1978, in Kibawe, Bukidnon, on the island of Mindanao, Philippines. He is the son of Rosalio Pacquiao and actress Dionisia Dapidran. His parents separated when he was in sixth grade, after his father had an affair. He is the fourth of six siblings, one of whom, Alberto "Bobby" Pacquiao, is also a politician and former professional boxer. Pacquiao was raised in General Santos, South Cotabato, also on the island of Mindanao.

At the age of 14, Pacquiao moved to Manila and lived on the streets, worked as a construction worker and had to pick between eating or sending money to his mother. Pacquiao completed his elementary education at Saavedra Saway Elementary School in General Santos, but dropped out of high school due to extreme and abject poverty.

In February 2007, Pacquiao took and passed a high school equivalency exam, and was awarded with a high school diploma by the Department of Education.

== Boxing career ==
=== Overview ===
Manny Pacquiao has an amateur record of 60–4 and a record of 62–8–3 as a professional, with 39 wins by knockout. Boxing historian Bert Sugar ranked Pacquiao as the greatest southpaw fighter of all time. In 2021, he ranked number 1 in DAZN's list of the top 10 boxers of the last 30 years.

Pacquiao made history by being the first boxer ever to win world titles in eight weight divisions, having won twelve major world titles. He won the lineal championship in four different weight classes. Pacquiao is also the first boxer in history to win major world titles in four of the original eight weight classes of boxing, also known as the "glamour divisions" (flyweight, featherweight, lightweight and welterweight), and the first boxer ever to become a four-decade world champion, winning world championships across four decades (1990s, 2000s, 2010s, and 2020s).

Pacquiao was long rated as the best pound for pound boxer in the world, by most sporting news and boxing websites, including ESPN, Sports Illustrated, Sporting Life, Yahoo! Sports, About.com, BoxRec and The Ring, beginning from his climb to lightweight until his losses in 2012. He is also the longest reigning top-ten active boxer on The Ring's pound for pound list from 2003 to 2016.

Pacquiao has generated approximately 20.4 million in pay-per-view (PPV) buys and $1.3 billion in revenue from 26 PPV-bouts. According to Forbes, he was the world's second highest paid athlete in 2015.

Pacquiao signed with Bob Arum's Top Rank from 2015 to 2017 and Al Haymon's Premier Boxing Champions (PBC) promotion on 2018 alongside Paradigm Sports Management on 2020.

On September 29, 2021, Pacquiao announced his retirement from boxing, in a post on social media.

On July 28, 2024, Pacquiao made his debut on Super RIZIN 3 in an exhibition featherweight bout against kickboxer Rukiya Anpo in a boxing match under Rizin Special standing bout rules. As there was no judge's decision, the bout ended in a draw.

=== Early years ===
Pacquiao was introduced to boxing at the age of 12 by his maternal uncle Sardo Mejia. According to his autobiography, Pacquiao said watching James "Buster" Douglas defeat Mike Tyson in 1990 with his Uncle Sardo was an experience that "changed my life forever". Mejia began training his nephew in a makeshift home gym.

After 6 months of training, Pacquiao began boxing in a park in General Santos, eventually traveling to other cities to fight higher-ranked opponents. By age 15, he was considered the best junior boxer in the southern Philippines and he moved to Manila. In January 1995, at the age of 16, he made his professional boxing debut as a junior flyweight.

Pacquiao stated of his early years, "Many of you know me as a legendary boxer, and I'm proud of that. However, that journey was not always easy. When I was younger, I became a fighter because I had to survive. I had nothing. I had no one to depend on except myself. I realized that boxing was something I was good at, and I trained hard so that I could keep myself and my family alive."

On December 4, 1998, at the age of 19, he won his first major title, the World Boxing Council (WBC) flyweight title.

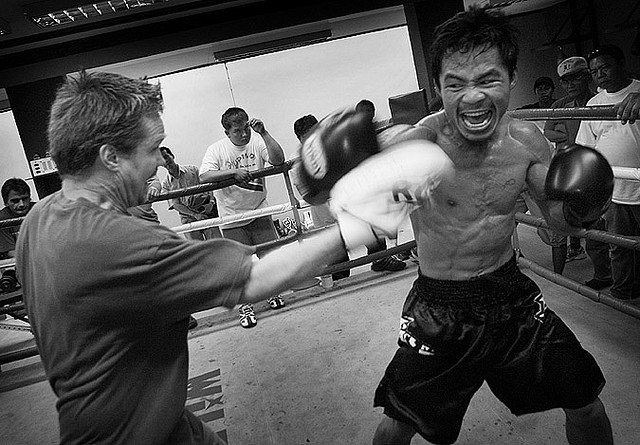
Pacquiao with his trainer Freddie Roach

=== Notable fights ===
Over the course of his decorated career, Pacquiao has defeated 22 world champions: Chatchai Sasakul, Lehlohonolo Ledwaba, Jorge Eliécer Julio, Marco Antonio Barrera (twice), Érik Morales (twice), Óscar Larios, Jorge Solís, Juan Manuel Márquez (twice), David Díaz, Oscar De La Hoya, Ricky Hatton, Miguel Cotto, Joshua Clottey, Antonio Margarito, Shane Mosley, Brandon Ríos, Timothy Bradley (twice), Chris Algieri, Jessie Vargas, Lucas Matthysse, Adrien Broner and Keith Thurman.

Pacquiao's most recent bout was against Mario Barrios in 2025. Pacquiao also boxed in an exhibition match against former world champion Jesus Salud, which he won.

==== Ranking and awards ====
Pacquiao was named "Fighter of the Decade" for the 2000s by the Boxing Writers Association of America (BWAA), World Boxing Council (WBC), World Boxing Organization (WBO), The Sporting News and Home Box Office (HBO). In 2006, 2008, and 2009, he was awarded Ring magazine, ESPN and BWAA's Fighter of the Year, and in 2009 and 2011 he won the Best Fighter ESPY Award. BoxRec ranks him as the greatest Asian fighter of all time.

In 2016, Pacquiao ranked No. 2 on ESPN's list of top pound for pound boxers of the past 25 years and he ranks No.4 in BoxRec's ranking of the greatest pound for pound boxers of all time. As of 2022, Pacquiao was ranked ninth in The Ring's list of the top 100 boxers of all time.

In 2025, Pacquiao was awarded the Fighter of the Century honor by the World Boxing Council and joined Sugar Ray Robinson as the only boxer to have won the "triple crown" of legacy awards: Fighter of the Year, Fighter of the Decade and Fighter of the Century. Also in 2025, Pacquiao ranked second behind his fierce rival Floyd Mayweather in The Ring's list of the greatest pound-for-pound fighters of the 21st century.

Pacquiao is a holder of six Guinness Book World Records. He has the most consecutive boxing world title fight victories at different weights at 15, between 2005 and 2011; he is named the oldest welterweight boxing world champion when he claimed the WBA Welterweight title aged 40 years 215 days on July 20, 2019; he has the most boxing world titles won in different weight divisions with eight, when he defeated Antonio Margarito (USA) to win the WBC Super Welterweight title on November 13, 2010.

He has also held sanctioned belts in the WBC Flyweight, Super Featherweight and Lightweight divisions, plus The Ring Featherweight, IBF Super Bantamweight, IBO and The Ring Light Welterweight and WBO Welterweight. He recorded the highest selling pay-per-view boxing match in a Welterweight title fight at the MGM Grand in Las Vegas, Nevada, USA, on May 2, 2015, and the highest revenue earned from ticket sales for a boxing match from ticket sales title fight at the MGM Grand in Las Vegas, Nevada, USA, on May 2, 2015.

=== Olympics ===
Pacquiao has never competed in the Summer Olympics. However, he would participate in the parade of nations of the 2008 Summer Olympics opening ceremony as the Philippine delegation's flag bearer; the first-ever non-participant to serve as the country's flagbearer. Swimmer Miguel Molina, 2005 Southeast Asian Games' Best Male Athlete, yielded the role to Pacquiao, upon the request of President Gloria Macapagal-Arroyo to national sports officials.

He had the opportunity to compete in the 2016 Summer Olympics in Rio de Janeiro, when professional boxers under the age of 40 were allowed to compete in the games for the first time. However Pacquiao, decided not to compete. Pacquiao would signify his interest to qualify for the 2024 Summer Olympics in France. The Philippine Olympic Committee would make a failed petition to the International Olympic Committee (IOC). Now 45-years old, Pacquiao was disallowed to participate after the IOC decided to uphold the 40-year-old age limit.

=== Earnings ===
Forbes listed Pacquiao as the world's equal sixth highest paid athlete, with a total of $40 million or ₱2 billion pesos from the second half of 2008 to the first half of 2009. Tied with him on the sixth spot was NBA player LeBron James and golfer Phil Mickelson. Pacquiao was again included in Forbes' list of highest paid athletes from the second half of 2009 to the first half of 2010; he was ranked eighth with an income of $42 million. Pacquiao also won the 2009 ESPY Awards for the Best Fighter category, beating fellow boxer Shane Mosley and Brazilian mixed martial arts fighters Lyoto Machida and Anderson Silva. ESPN Magazine reported that Pacquiao was one of the two top earning athletes for 2010, alongside American Major League Baseball player Alex Rodriguez. According to the magazine's annual salary report of athletes, Pacquiao earned $32 million (approximately PhP 1.38 billion) for his two 2010 boxing matches against Clottey and Margarito.

=== Sports administration ===
Pacquiao was appointed as vice president of the International Boxing Association in October 2025. The Philippine Olympic Committee has cautioned Pacquiao over associating himself with the IBA, an organization which has been expelled from the International Olympic Committee.

== Basketball career ==
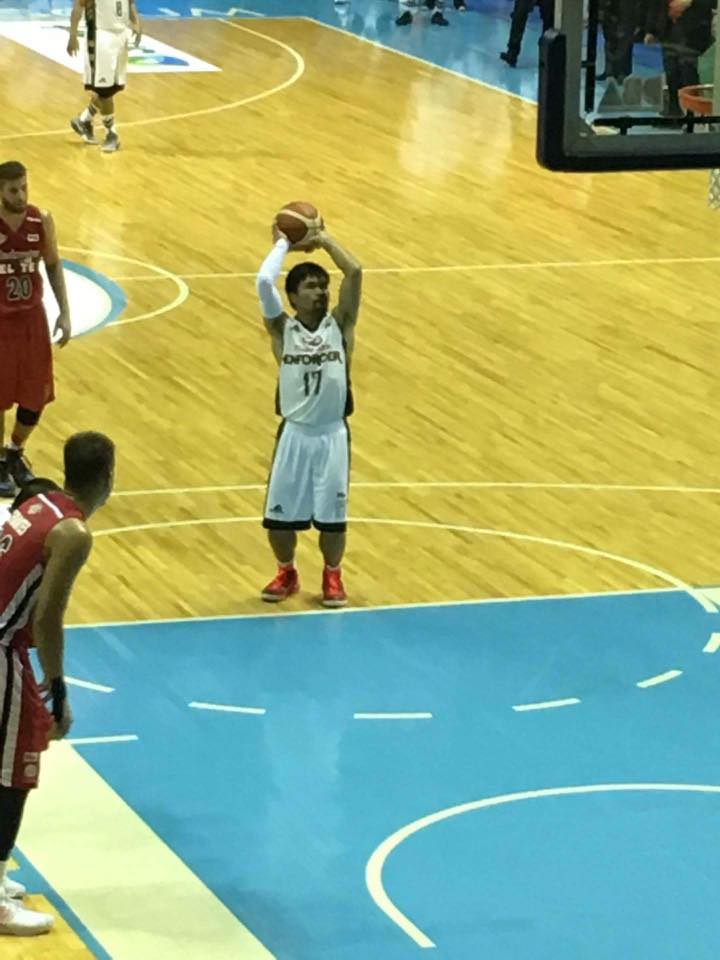
Pacquiao with the Mahindra Enforcer in 2016

On April 17, 2014, Pacquiao, a passionate basketball fan, announced his intention to join the Philippine Basketball Association as the playing coach of Kia Motors Basketball team, an incoming expansion team for the PBA's 2014–15 season. As the team's head coach, he asked other teams to not draft him before Kia, and picked himself 11th overall in the first round of the 2014 PBA draft, being the oldest rookie to be ever drafted in the league's history. Pacquiao played basketball as part of his training before his matches and prior to his PBA stint, Pacquiao was named an honorary member of the Boston Celtics and established friendships with Steph Curry and basketball Hall of Famers Kobe Bryant, Kevin Garnett, and Ray Allen. NBA player Karl-Anthony Towns cites Pacquiao as a "legend" & visited him along with Klay Thompson at training.

On September 4, 2014, Pacquiao trained with the Golden State Warriors at their training facility in preparation for his PBA stint.

On February 18, 2015, Pacquiao played briefly and scored one point when the Sorento pulled a 95–84 upset against Purefoods, which had tapped former NBA player Daniel Orton as their import for the conference. When asked about playing against him, Orton said that "[Pacquiao playing] is a joke...Professional boxer? Yeah. Congressman? All right. But professional basketball player? Seriously? It's a joke." Orton was fined by PBA commissioner Chito Salud and was replaced after a few days. He later became one of the Pilipinas MX3 Kings owners in the Asean Basketball League.

On October 25, 2015, Pacquiao made his first field goal in the PBA in a 108–94 loss against the Rain or Shine Elasto Painters. On August 21, 2016, Pacquiao scored a career-high four points in a 97–88 victory against the Blackwater Elite, also sinking the first three-point field goal in his career.

In 2017, Pacquiao founded the Maharlika Pilipinas Basketball League, initially a semi-professional league. The MPBL turned professional in 2022. In 2018, although being rumored to transfer to Blackwater, Pacquiao officially announced his retirement from the league after playing just ten games in three seasons and scoring less than fifteen career points.

In 2019, Pacquiao announced that he is "planning to own an NBA team" after boxing retirement.

== Political career ==
=== House of Representatives (2010–2016) ===
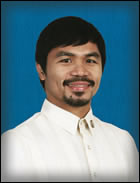
Portrait of Manny Pacquiao during his term as Sarangani representative in the 16th Congress

On February 12, 2007, Pacquiao announced his campaign for a seat in the Philippine House of Representatives to represent the 1st District of South Cotabato province running as a candidate of the Liberal Party faction under Manila mayor Lito Atienza. Pacquiao, said he was persuaded to run by the local officials of General Santos, hoping he would act as a bridge between their interests and the national government. Ultimately Pacquiao was forced to run under the Kabalikat ng Malayang Pilipino (KAMPI), a pro-Arroyo political party by the courts. Pacquiao was defeated in the election by incumbent Rep. Darlene Antonino-Custodio of the Nationalist People's Coalition (NPC), who said, "More than anything, I think, people weren't prepared to lose him as their boxing icon."

In preparation for his political career in the Filipino House of Representatives, Pacquiao enrolled in the Certificate Course in Development, Legislation, and Governance at the Development Academy of the Philippines – Graduate School of Public and Development Management (DAP-GSPDM).

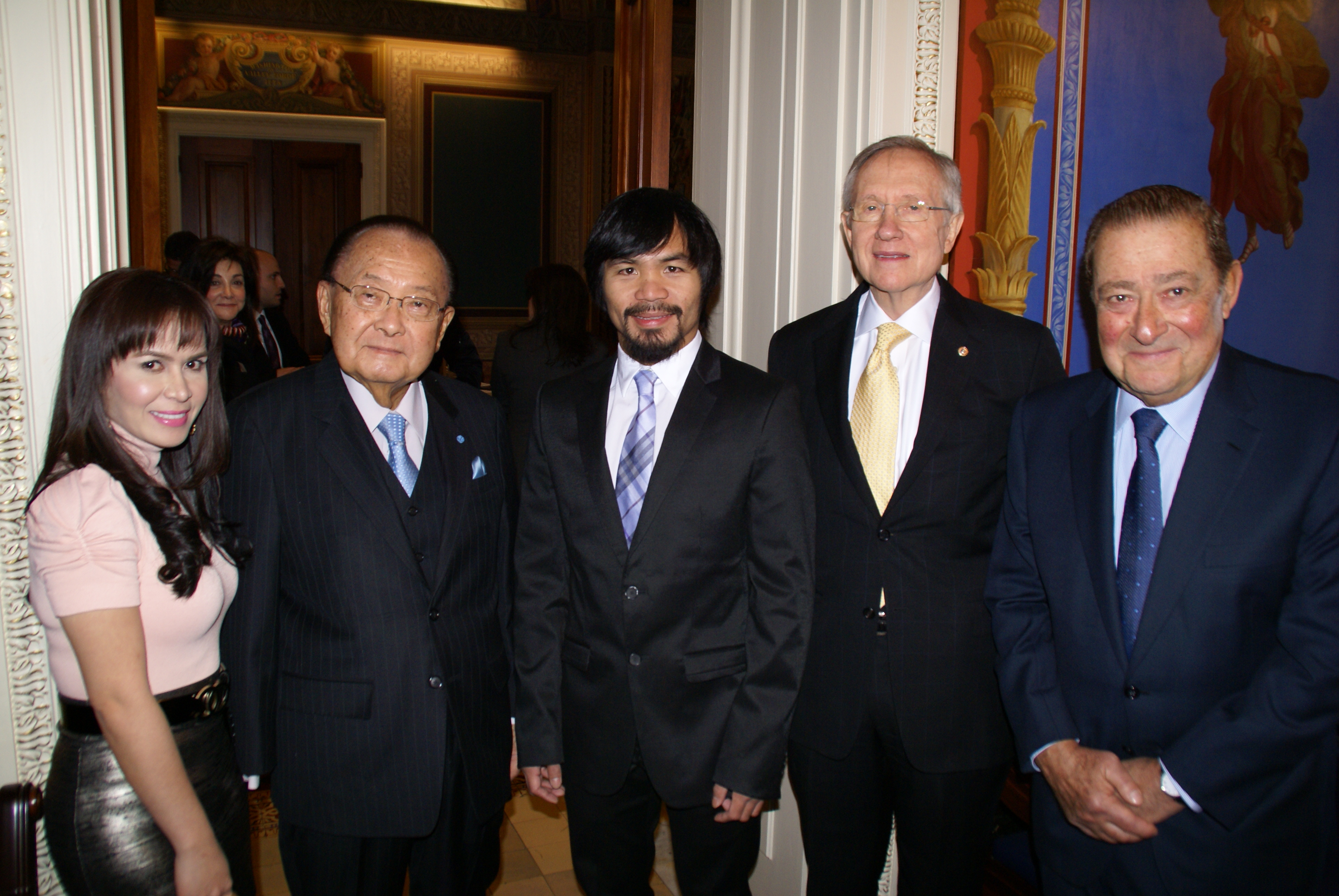
Manny Pacquiao and Jinkee Pacquiao with U.S. Senators Harry Reid and Daniel Inouye

On November 21, 2009, Pacquiao announced that he would run again for a congressional seat, but this time in Sarangani province, the hometown of his wife Jinkee. In May 2010, Pacquiao was elected to the House of Representatives in the 15th Congress of the Philippines, representing the province of Sarangani. He scored a landslide victory over the wealthy and politically well-entrenched Chiongbian clan that had been in power in the province for more than thirty years. Pacquiao got 120,052 votes while his opponent for the seat, Roy Chiongbian, got 60,899 votes.

In 2010, Pacquiao made a speech on human trafficking that earned praise. However, he also received criticism for coming out as uninformed during a discussion of the contentious reproductive health bill that same year.

In 2013, he was re-elected to the 16th Congress of the Philippines. He ran unopposed. Additionally, his wife, Jinkee, was also elected as vice-governor of Sarangani, while his younger brother, Rogelio lost his bid as congressman.

Because of other commitments, Pacquiao only attended one Congress session on the congress' final leg and was criticized for being the top absentee among lawmakers. Pacquiao filed a total of less than 20 bills in six years, with zero of them passing beyond committee.

=== Senate (2016–2022) ===
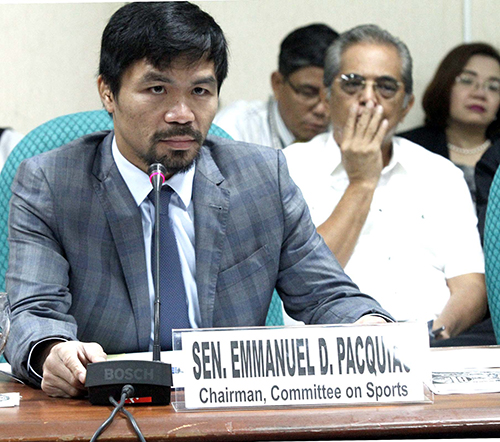
Senator Pacquiao, as chair of the Senate Committee on Sports, discusses a proposal seeking to establish a Philippine Boxing Commission.

On October 5, 2015, Pacquiao formally declared that he was running for senator under the United Nationalist Alliance (UNA) party of vice-president Jejomar Binay. On May 19, 2016, Pacquiao was formally elected as a senator by the Commission on Elections. Pacquiao garnered over 16 million votes, landing at 7th place.

Pacquiao earlier aligned himself with the Duterte government. He facilitated on September 18, 2016, the ouster of Leila de Lima (a Duterte critic) from the chairmanship of the Senate Justice committee and criticized de Lima's presentation three days later of an alleged member of the Davao Death Squad.

In another Senate hearing, Pacquiao defended then-Davao City Vice Mayor Paolo Duterte from allegations of having a part, along with the vice mayor's alleged drinking buddy Charlie Tan and Kenneth Dong, in a 2017 seized ₱6.4-billion shipment of illegal drugs from Xiamen, China, into the Philippines.

As of 2018, Pacquiao has filed a total of 31 Senate bills during the 17th Congress. And in a bill filed alongside Senator Bato dela Rosa and Bong Go, he backed the return of capital punishment.

In June 2019, the Philippine Senate released a data showing Pacquiao as having the worst attendance record among all senators in the 17th Congress, reflecting a struggle Pacquiao had since he was a congressman. Despite the poor attendance, he still managed to enact four laws from the bills he filed.

During the COVID-19 pandemic in 2020, Pacquiao worked with Alibaba Group co-founder Jack Ma to help bring to the Philippines 50,000 COVID-19 test kits through their respective charity foundations.

In December 2020, Pacquiao became acting party president of PDP–Laban, the ruling political party, when Koko Pimentel resigned. However, the position will eventually become disputed between Pacquiao and Energy Secretary Alfonso Cusi. Alfonso Cusi's faction through a vote decided that Pacquiao is no longer party president of PDP–Laban on July 17. Melvin Matibag, the deputy secretary-general of PDP–Laban, defended the vote, saying it was organized because the term limits of the party's officials had already expired. Pacquiao is still regarded by his faction as party president.

In May 2021, Senator Pacquiao filed a bill proposing to create the Philippine Boxing and Combat Sports Commission. The move, however, was lambasted by Senator Pia Cayetano who criticized the timing of the proposal in the midst of the coronavirus pandemic. Pacquiao earlier already tried filing the bill during the 17th Congress when Pacquiao and Senator Franklin Drilon made headlines after Pacquiao called out the latter and senior legislator to use his "common sense" during an interpellation about the topic while Pacquiao was apparently being coached by his advisers after struggling to answer Drilon.

In May 2022, Pacquiao called for the "speedy release" of fellow Senator Leila De Lima, who had been detained for five years, after witnesses against De Lima retracted their testimony. Pacquiao had earlier been vocal about De Lima's supposed links to a purported drug lord, Kerwin Espinosa, an allegation that led to De Lima's arrest and detention.

=== 2022 presidential campaign ===
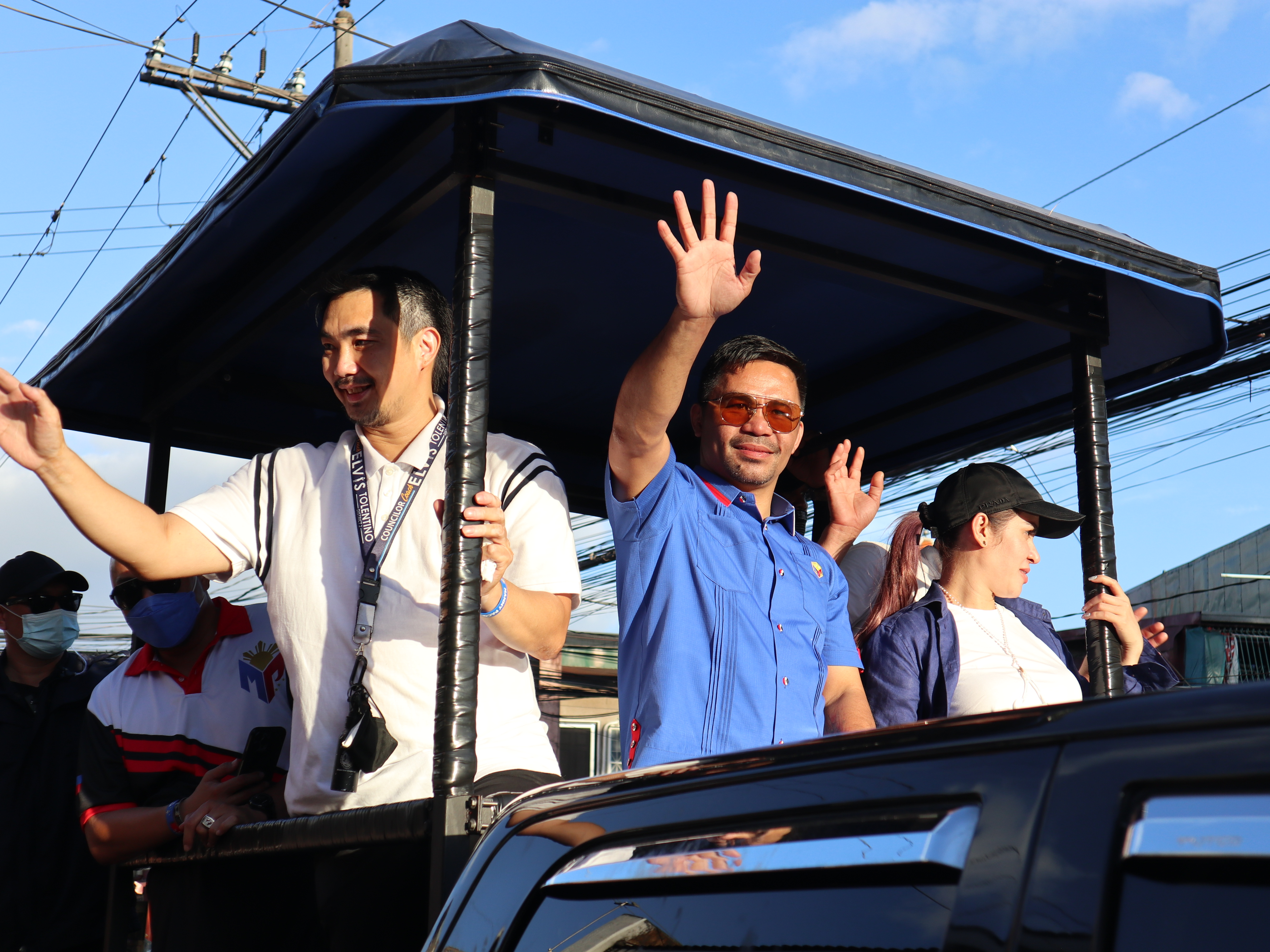
Pacquiao during an election motorcade in Marikina, February 2022

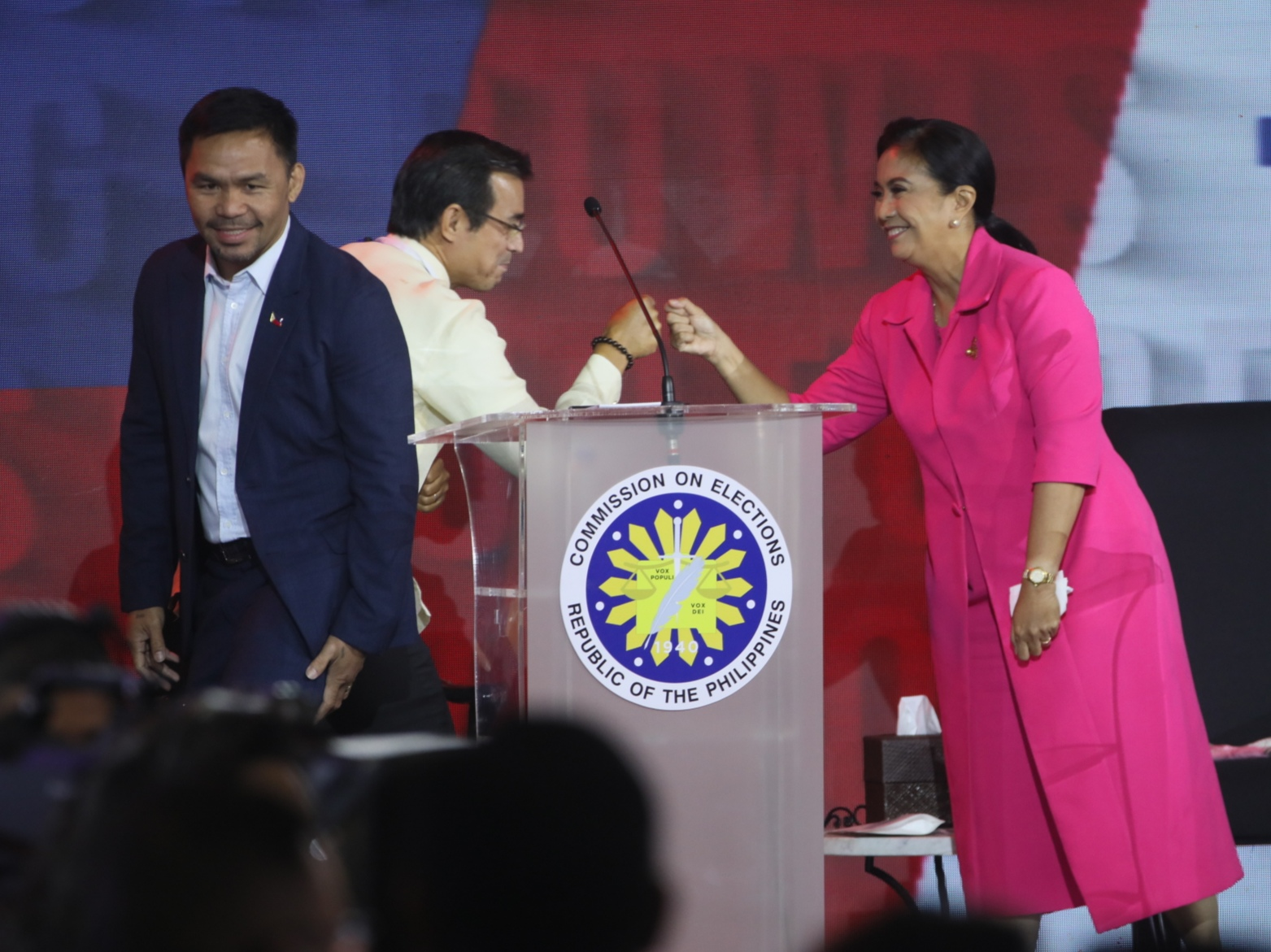
Pacquiao (left) with Isko Moreno (center) and Leni Robredo (right) during the 2nd presidential debate

As early as June 2020, Pacquiao's former promoter Bob Arum declared that the senator expressed that he will run in 2022 in a conversation with him uttering "Bob, I'm gonna run in 2022 and, when I win, I want you there at my inauguration.'" Speculations quickly spread around a possible Pacquiao run for president, backed by his own expression of interest in a presidential bid.

In June 2021, he expressed belief that Duterte's response towards China's claims in the South China Sea was lacking. Duterte rebuked Pacquiao for the statement, saying the latter lacked knowledge in foreign policy. The president also responded to a claim attributed to Pacquiao that the Duterte administration is more corrupt than those by his predecessors; Duterte challenged Pacquiao to name certain individuals or agencies, otherwise he will launch a negative campaign against the senator in the 2022 elections.

A month after being asked about the possibility of him running in the postgame interview after losing his final boxing match against Yordenis Ugas, Pacquiao officially announced his presidential bid on September 19, 2021, during the National Assembly of the PDP–Laban, organized by his faction. On October 1, he formally registered his candidacy under the Cebu-based party PROMDI. This was in accordance with the "MP3 Alliance" established by PDP Laban under Pacquiao's faction with PROMDI, and the People's Champ Movement. Cusi, in response to Pacquiao's filing of candidacy under PROMDI, decided that he is no longer a member of PDP-Laban.

His platforms included solving corruption and a promise of nationwide housing projects for the poor. Since the campaign period started in February, he had struggled in the presidential surveys with low ratings ranking fourth to fifth among the candidates, dropping to as low as 1.8 percent on the March 2022 poll by Publicus Asia and 8 percent on Pulse Asia with his disapproval rating going up.

In March 2022, amid recent news about frontrunner Bongbong Marcos' unsettled estate tax dues amounting to 200 billion pesos, Pacquiao openly challenged Marcos to a one-on-one debate and made remarks against critics saying "he's not intelligent enough to be president" saying that "the most dumb in this country are those who are going to vote for a plunderer". Pacquiao only placed third in the election with roughly four million votes and later conceded to Marcos, who won by a landslide.

=== 2025 Senate bid ===
On September 26, 2024, Pacquiao was named as a senatorial candidate for the Alyansa para sa Bagong Pilipinas in the 2025 elections. He ran under the Partido Federal ng Pilipinas. He formalized his bid for senator by filing his certificate of candidacy on October 7, 2024. Pacquiao would eventually lose his bid for the Senate, placing 18th out of the 12 seats up for election, garnering 10,397,133 votes. He has considered leaving politics after returning to boxing.

=== Return to government ===
On September 8, 2026, Pacquiao was appointed as secretary and lead convenor of the National Anti-Poverty Commission by president Bongbong Marcos.

== Entertainment career ==
=== Acting and hosting career ===
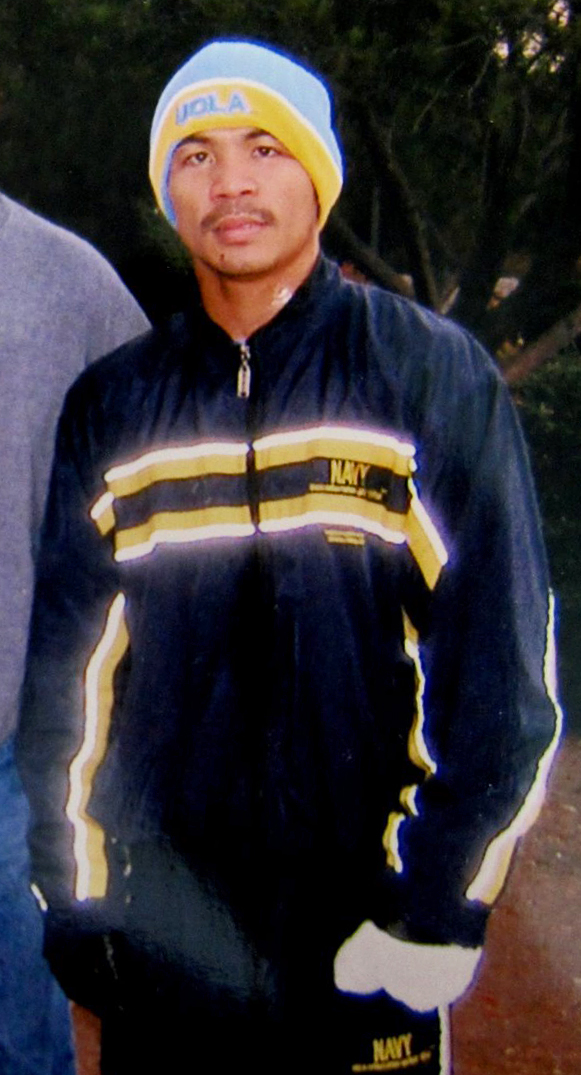
Pacquiao in 2009

With growing fame, Pacquiao became a celebrity and was obligated to start his acting and hosting career with guest appearances on ABS-CBN shows. He signed a contract as an actor & host with ABS-CBN short-after.

In December 2005, Pacquiao took his first lead role in Violett Films' Lisensyadong Kamao (Licensed Fist). The film is titled so because (according to director Tony Bernal), being a boxer, Pacquiao is licensed to use his hands.

Upon the expiration of his contract with ABS-CBN, Pacquiao signed with GMA Network as an actor and host in September 2007. A few months after, he taped his first episode of the network's infotainment show Pinoy Records. His other projects with the network included Totoy Bato and the sitcom Show Me Da Manny, where he appeared as Marian Rivera's onscreen loveteam, and in which his mother, Dionisia, also appeared. He also hosted his own game show Manny Many Prizes where he gave out prizes to his audience.

In 2008, Pacquiao starred with Ara Mina and Valerie Concepcion in Anak ng Kumander (Child of a Commander). The movie was not a commercial success and was panned by critics.

Pacquiao starred in the superhero/comedy film entitled Wapakman, which was released on December 25, 2009, as an entry to the 2009 Metro Manila Film Festival. Like his previous films, Wapakman was not commercially successful.

In 2020, he was cast to portray General Miguel Malvar in the upcoming biopic film Malvar: Tuloy ang Laban about the Philippine hero, which gained mixed reactions from the Malvar family. Gabriel, grandson of General Malvar's youngest child Pablo, worries that Pacquiao's fame might overshadow his movie character. While Villegas, son of Malvar's daughter Isabel, supports the casting.

=== Music career ===
Pacquiao recorded songs to use as entrance music for his fights and released them on two albums that were certified platinum locally in the Philippines. Most of the Tagalog songs of Pacquiao were composed by Lito Camo who wrote Pacquiao's biggest hit and primarily known song "Para Sayo ang Laban Na 'To".

On November 3, 2009, Pacquiao covered "Sometimes When We Touch", originally by Dan Hill, on Jimmy Kimmel Live!, marking his first singing performance on American TV. He went back to the late-night talk show on March 3, 2010, to cover another song, "Nothing's Gonna Change My Love for You". He would later record Dan Hill's hit in April 2011 as a single which reached number 19 on the Billboard Adult Contemporary chart. It made Pacquiao one of the few Southeast Asians to enter a US Billboard chart. He also appeared with Will Ferrell and sang a version of John Lennon's "Imagine" for his third guesting on the show. His appearances on the show led to Canadian rapper Drake impersonating him and making fun of his singing by creating a parody, Pacquiao responded by posting another video of himself singing. In 2015, he released an extended play that featured his own recorded entrance song for his fight against Floyd Mayweather Jr. and shortly announced his retirement from music, being quoted saying "I love music, but music is not for me".

The following are Manny Pacquiao's albums from 2006 to 2015:

==== Albums ====
- Laban Nating Lahat Ito (2006), Star
- Pac-Man Punch (2007), MCA
- Lalaban Ako para sa Pilipino (EP) (2015), GMA

== In popular culture ==
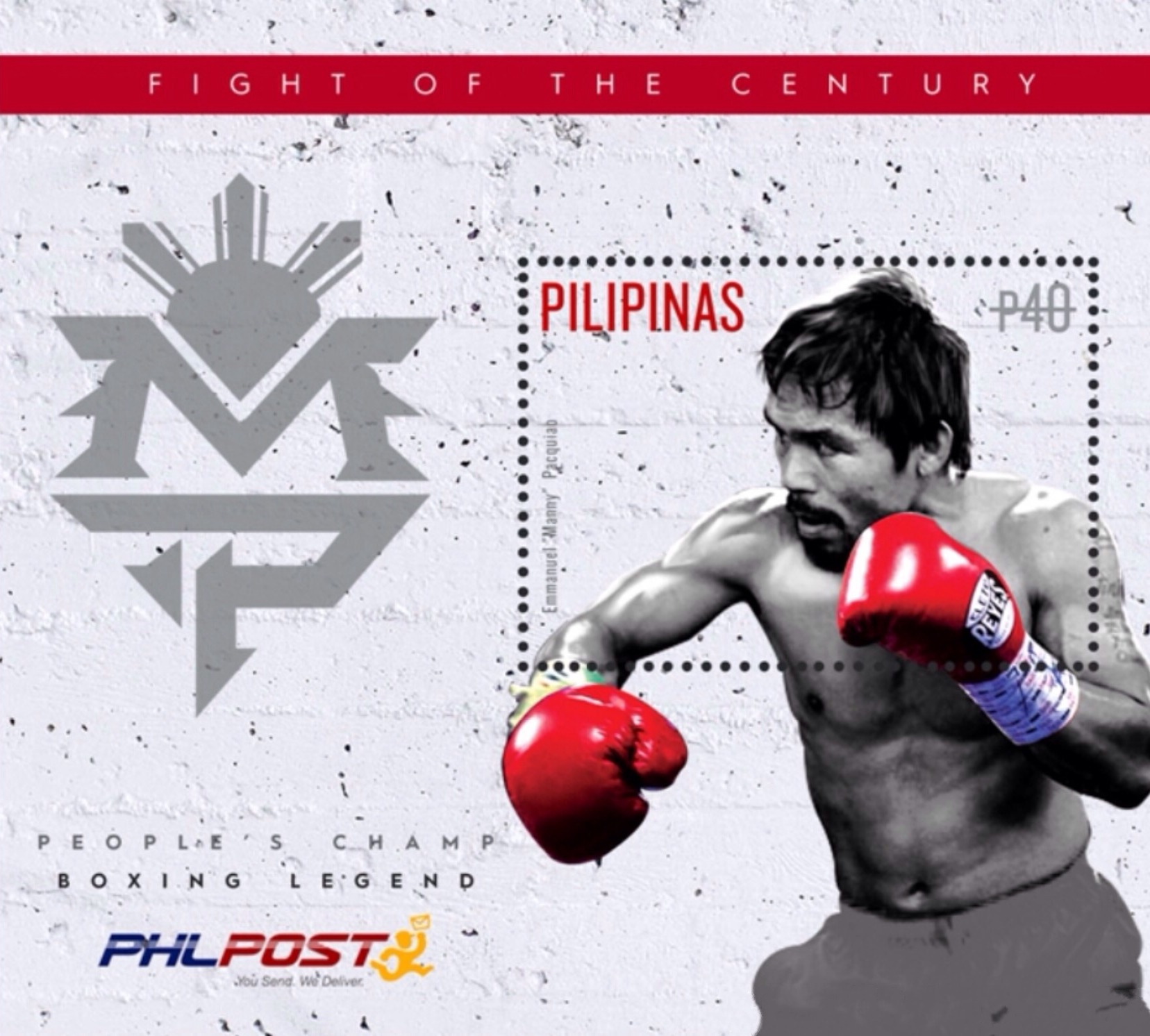
A stamp sheet issued by the Philippine Postal Corporation in April 2015

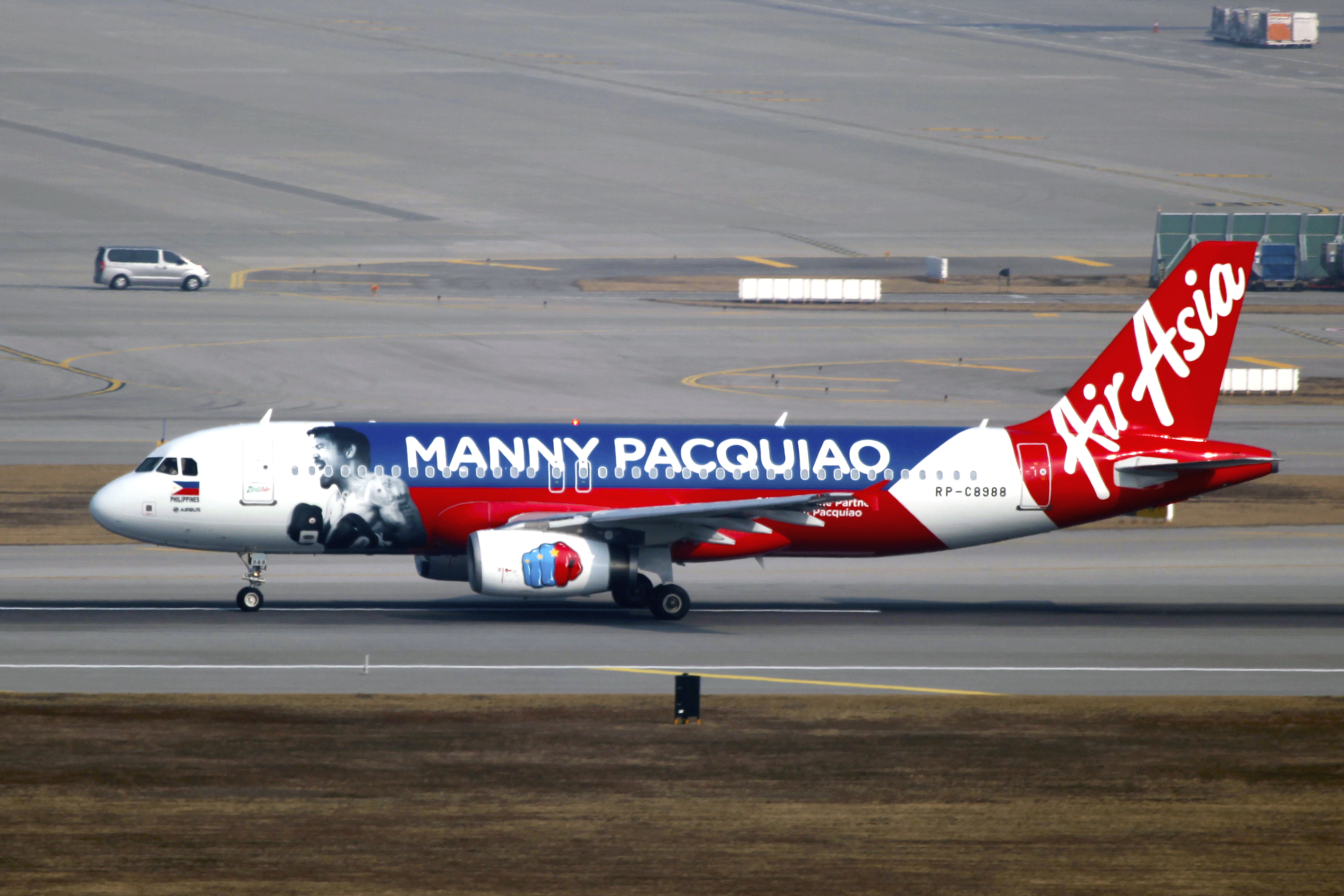
AirAsia Zest plane with Pacquiao-themed livery.

A film based on Pacquiao's life, Pacquiao: The Movie, was released on June 21, 2006, featuring Filipino actor Jericho Rosales as Manny Pacquiao and was directed by Joel Lamangan. The film flopped at the box office, grossing a total of only ₱4,812,191 (approximately US$99,322), as confirmed by Lamangan.

Another film, based on Pacquiao's early life in boxing, Kid Kulafu, was released on April 15, 2015, featuring actor Buboy Villar as Emmanuel "Manny" Pacquiao. The film dramatizes the life of the Filipino boxing superstar during his childhood.

A documentary entitled "Manny", which featured Pacquiao's early life as well as his boxing and political career, was released with Liam Neeson as the narrator.

Pacquiao has featured in the Fight Night boxing video game franchise as a playable character. The playable character Paquito, in the mobile game, Mobile Legends: Bang Bang was also inspired from Pacquiao. A skin was also made available for Paquito which changes the character's appearance to that of the real life boxer. Filipino game developer Ranida Games announced in 2021 that a mobile game revolving around Pacquiao's boxing career Fighting Pride: The Manny Pacquiao Saga is in the works.

Pacquiao was one of Time's 100 most influential people for the year 2009, for his exploits in boxing and his influence among the Filipino people. Pacquiao was also included by Forbes in its annual Celebrity 100 list for the year 2009, joining Hollywood actress Angelina Jolie and fellow athletes Woods and Bryant.

Pacquiao has also appeared on the cover of Time magazine Asia for their November 16, 2009 issue. According to their five-page feature story, "(Pacquiao is) a fighter with enough charisma, intelligence and backstory to help rescue a sport lost in the labyrinth of pay-per-view. Global brands like Nike want him in their ads." They also added, "Pacquiao has a myth of origin equal to that of any Greek or Roman hero. He leaves the Philippines to make it even bigger, conquering the world again and again to bring back riches to his family and friends." Pacquiao became the eighth Filipino to grace the cover of the prestigious magazine, after former Philippine presidents Manuel L. Quezon, Ramon Magsaysay, Ferdinand Marcos, Corazon Aquino, Gloria Macapagal-Arroyo, Benigno "Noynoy" Aquino III and Filipino actress and environmentalist Chin Chin Gutierrez. Pacquiao was also featured on the cover of Reader's Digest Asia, where a seven-page story was written about the Filipino boxing superstar. The issue came out in November 2008, before Pacquiao's fight against De La Hoya.

Pacquiao is also mentioned in some hip hop tracks including Kool A.D.'s song entitled "Manny Pacquiao" on his mixtape, 51. A few notable ones are Pitbull's "Get It Started", A$AP Rocky's "Phoenix", Bad Meets Evil and Bruno Mars' "Lighters", Eminem and Skylar Grey's "Asshole", Future's "Never Gon' Lose", Migos' "Chinatown", Nicki Minaj and Ciara's "I'm Legit" and Rick Ross's "High Definition", Jelo Acosta's "Just Like Manny P," and Yung Gravy's "Betty" to name a few.

Pacquiao became the first Filipino athlete to appear on a postage stamp.

A video clip of Pacquiao greeting his followers for New Year's Eve was used as a meme in the Internet.

== Controversies ==
=== Taxation issues ===
On November 26, 2013, a few days after Pacquiao's victory over Brandon Ríos, the Philippine Bureau of Internal Revenue (BIR) issued a freeze order on all of Pacquiao's Philippine bank accounts due to his alleged failure to pay ₱2.2 billion in taxes for earnings he made in his fights in the United States from 2008 to 2009. A day after the bank account freeze, the BIR also issued an order to freeze all of Pacquiao's Philippine properties, whereupon Pacquiao presented documents to the press showing the income tax for non-resident alien payment by his promoter to the BIR's US counterpart, the Internal Revenue Service (IRS), as well as a letter from Bob Arum. In April 2017, Pacquiao, now a senator, approached Philippine authorities in an attempt to settle the case. The BIR had maintained that taxes were due even if all taxes had been paid to the IRS in the first place.

=== Homosexuality comments ===
In February 2016, Pacquiao, in a video statement posted by TV5, made a comment on the issue of same-sex marriage. Pacquiao, in vernacular, described people in same-sex marriages as behaving worse than animals because, he said, animals generally do not have same-sex mating. LGBT celebrities criticized the statements of the senatorial candidate. Pacquiao later apologized and stated that while, as a Christian, he is still against same-sex marriage, which he said is against Biblical teachings, he did not condemn gay people themselves. Nike ended their longtime partnership with Pacquiao, stating his comments against gay people were abhorrent. The Grove at Farmers Market in Los Angeles also banned Pacquiao from the shopping mall.

=== Paradigm Sports Management contract dispute ===
In 2021, Paradigm Sports Management – the company Pacquiao signed an exclusive management deal with a year prior – filed a lawsuit against him, alleging he in bad faith breached the contract having two management companies negotiating simultaneously for boxing matches.

In early May 2023, Orange County Superior Court ruled the lawsuit in favor of Paradigm Sports Management, ordering Pacquiao to pay $5.1 million plus at least $2 million in attorney fees, both with 10 percent annual interest. In August 2024, the verdict was overturned and vacated. The court found evidence, that when signing the contract to represent Pacquiao, Audie Attar did not hold a management license, which is required under California law.

== Personal life ==
Pacquiao married Jinkee Jamora on May 10, 1999. Together, they have five children, Emmanuel Jr. (Jimuel), Michael Stephen, Mary Divine Grace (Princess), Queen Elizabeth (Queenie) and Israel. His eldest son with Jinkee, Jimuel, is also a professional boxer, having made his professional boxing debut on November 30, 2025, in a majority draw, as well as a model and actor, while his second son, Michael, is a rapper, who has amassed tens of millions of streams with his songs, and incumbent councilor of General Santos. His first daughter, Princess, is a popular YouTube vlogger with millions of subscribers and started the Pacquiao family's network of YouTube content, while his second daughter, Queenie, was born in the United States. On May 27, 2024, Princess graduated secondary school from Brent International School.

In 2006, Joanna Rose Bacosa, a KTV receptionist, disclosed the existence of her child with Pacquiao named as Emmanuel "Eman" Bacosa, who was born in January 2004. Although Pacquiao initially did not acknowledge him, he was later seen training with a teenaged Eman, who began following in his father's footsteps and pursued boxing. Eman made his professional boxing debut on September 23, 2023, which ended in a draw. He dedicated his win against Noel Pangantao on December 15, 2023, to his father. Eman disclosed that he and Pacquiao had reconciled in private, and Eman was legalized prior to his professional debut, before officially carrying the Pacquiao surname publicly in November 2025.

Pacquiao resides in his hometown of General Santos, South Cotabato, Philippines. As the congressman representing the lone district of Sarangani from 2010 to 2016, he officially resided in Kiamba, Sarangani, the hometown of his wife. Upon his election to the Senate of the Philippines, he returned his official residence to General Santos, as senators are elected on a nationwide basis, rather than by district.

On June 25, 2010, Pacquiao completed a 10-day crash course on Development Legislation and Governance at the Graduate School of Public and Development Management of the Development Academy of the Philippines (DAP).

Pacquiao was officially enrolled for two semesters at Notre Dame of Dadiangas University (NDDU) in the Academic Year 2007–2008 under the bachelor's degree of business administration major in marketing management program, however, Pacquiao was not able to finish the program and NDDU did not grant him a college degree.

From June 8 to 17, 2016, Pacquiao underwent another 9-day Executive Coaching Program crash course conducted by the Development Academy of the Philippines, the Ateneo School of Government, the Asian Institute of Management, and the Philippine Public Safety College after he won a senate seat in 2016.

On December 11, 2019, Pacquiao controversially graduated from the University of Makati with a bachelor's degree in political science; majoring in local government administration through the Expanded Tertiary Education Equivalency and Accreditation Program (ETEEAP) of the Philippine Councilors League-Legislative Academy (PCCLA) which allows qualified Filipinos to complete a collegiate-level education via informal education system. Pacquiao reportedly completed the degree in one year, contrary to earlier reports of three months.

Raised Catholic, Pacquiao is currently practicing and preaching Evangelical Protestantism. Pacquiao said he once had a dream where he saw a pair of angels and heard the voice of God—this dream convinced him to become a devout believer.

Pacquiao enlisted as a military reservist and was promoted with the rank of colonel in the Reserve Force of the Philippine Army. Prior to being promoted to full colonel after finishing his General Staff Course (GSC) schooling, he held the rank of lieutenant colonel for being a member of the Philippine Congress as per the AFP's regulations for reservist officers. He first entered the army's reserve force on April 27, 2006, as a sergeant. Later, he rose to Technical Sergeant on December 1 of the same year. On October 7, 2007, he became a Master Sergeant, the highest rank for enlisted personnel. On May 4, 2009, he was given the special rank of Senior Master Sergeant and was also designated as the Command Sergeant Major of the 15th Ready Reserve Division.

In 2022, Pacquiao graduated from Philippine Christian University, with a master's degree in management, majoring in public administration. Pacquiao's cousin is Rene Pacquiao, a 6'5 center from Bukidnon. Rene became a teammate of Pacquiao in the Mahindra Floodbusters.

In November 2025, Pacquiao launched MannyPay, an electronic wallet platform that aims to highlight lower transfer fees and eventually add remittance and cryptocurrency services.

== Awards and recognitions ==
=== International ===
- 2000–2009 Boxing Writers Association of America Fighter of the Decade
- 2000–2009 HBO Fighter of the Decade
- 2001–2010 World Boxing Council Boxer of the Decade
- 2001–2010 World Boxing Organization Best Pound-for-Pound Fighter of the Decade
- 2006, 2008 and 2009 Boxing Writers Association of America's Fighter of the Year
- 2006, 2008 and 2009 ESPN Fighter of the Year
- 2006, 2008 and 2009 The Ring Fighter of the Year
- 2007 World Boxing Hall of Fame Fighter of the year
- 2008 Sports Illustrated Boxer of the Year
- 2008 Yahoo! Sports Fighter of the Year
- 2008 and 2009 ESPN Star's Champion of Champions
- 2008 and 2009 World Boxing Council Boxer of the Year
- 2008, 2009, 2010 and 2011 The Ring No.1 Pound-for-Pound (year-end)
- 2009 ESPN Knockout of the Year (in Round 2 against Ricky Hatton)
- 2009 and 2011 ESPY Awards Best Fighter
- 2009 and 2015 Forbes magazine World's Highest-Paid Athletes (ranked 6th and 2nd)
- 2009 Sports Illustrated Fighter of the Year
- 2009 The Ring Knockout of the Year (in Round 2 against Ricky Hatton)
- 2009 TIME 100 Most Influential People (Heroes and Icons Category)
- 2009, 2010, 2012 and 2015 Forbes magazine Celebrity 100 (The World's Most Powerful Celebrity) (ranked 57th, 55th, 33rd and 2nd)
- 2010 World Boxing Organization Fighter of the Year
- 2010 Yahoo! Sports Boxing's Most Influential (ranked 25th)
- 2010, 2011, 2012 and 2015 The Ring Magazine Event of the year
- 2011 Las Vegas Walk of Stars Awardee
- 2011 Guinness World Records Most boxing world titles in different weight divisions (8 times; since November 13, 2010)
- 2012 Laredo Asian Association Special Recognition Award
- 2013 On The Ropes Boxing Awards Comeback Fighter of the Year
- 2013 The Ring magazine Comeback of the Year
- 2014, 2015 and 2016 Reader's Digest Asia Pacific Most Trusted Sports Personality
- 2014 On The Ropes Boxing Awards Fighter of the Year
- 2014 PublicAffairsAsia HP Gold Standard Award for Communicator of the Year
- 2015 Asia Society's Asia Game Changer of the Year
- 2016 Forbes magazine Boxing's MVPs (ranked 4th)
- 2016 Martial Arts History Museum Hall of Fame inductee
- 2019 Forbes magazine Highest Paid Athletes of the Decade (ranked 8th)
- 2019 World Boxing News Fighter of the year
- 2025 World Boxing Council Fighter of the Century
- 2025 World Boxing Council Comeback of the Year
- 2025 WBN Boxing Comeback of the Year
- 2026 Global Outstanding Sporting Career Award

=== National ===
- 2000–2009 Philippine Sportswriters Association Athlete of the Decade
- 2000–2009 Gabriel "Flash" Elorde Memorial Boxer of the Decade
- 2001, 2002, 2003, 2004, 2005, 2006 and 2007 Gabriel "Flash" Elorde Memorial Boxer of the Year
- 2002, 2003, 2004, 2006 and 2008 PSA Sportsman of the Year
- 2003 Presidential Medal of Merit
- 2003 and 2010 Congressional Medal of Achievement / Distinction / Honor
- 2006 Order of Lakandula with the rank of "Champion for Life" (Kampeon Habambuhay)
- 2006 Eastwood City Walk of Fame Awardee
- 2006 36th GMMSF Box-Office Entertainment Awards People's Hero Award
- 2008 Gabriel "Flash" Elorde Memorial Hall of Fame Awardee
- 2008 Philippine Legion of Honor with the rank of "Officer" (Pinuno)
- 2008 University Athletic Association of the Philippines (UAAP) Honorary Award for Sports Excellence
- 2009 Gabriel "Flash" Elorde Memorial Best Pound For Pound Boxer Award
- 2009 25th Philippine Movie Press Club Star Awards for Movies Newsmaker of the Year
- 2009 Order of Sikatuna with the rank of Datu (Grand Cross with Gold Distinction)
- 2009 Southwestern University – honorary Doctorate of Humanities (Honoris Causa as accorded by the Commission on Higher Education)
- 2010–2019 Philippine Sportswriters Association Athlete of the Decade
- 2011 Gabriel "Flash" Elorde Memorial "Quintessential Athlete" Award
- 2012 Gabriel "Flash" Elorde Memorial "Man of Others" Award
- 2013, 2016 and 2018 Gabriel "Flash" Elorde Memorial Award of Distinction
- 2015 MEGA Man Magazine Man of the Year
- 2017 Bawas Bisyo Youth for Sin Tax Movement Anti-smoking champion
- 2018 League of Municipalities of the Philippines – Cebu "Cebuano Heritage Award for Manny Pacquiao"
- 2019 50th GMMSF Box-Office Entertainment Awards Global Achievement by a Filipino Award
- 2020 Clean Air Philippines Movement, Inc. (CAPMI) "Clean Air Champion" award
- 2021 Philippine Sportswriters Association Chooks-to-Go Fan Favorite "Manok ng Bayan" Award

== Electoral history ==
Electoral history of Manny Pacquiao
Year	Office	Party		Votes received				Result
Year	Office	Local	National	Total	%	P.	Swing	Result
2007	Representative (Sarangani)	—N/a	Liberal	75,908	35.51%	2nd	—N/a	Lost
2010	Representative (Sarangani)	PCM	Nacionalista	120,052	66.35%	1st	+30.84	Won
2013	Representative (Sarangani)	PCM	UNA	144,926	100.00%	1st	+33.65	Unopposed
2016	Senator of the Philippines	—N/a	UNA	16,050,546	35.68%	7th	—N/a	Won
2025	Senator of the Philippines	—N/a	PFP	10,397,133	18.13%	18th	-17.55	Lost
2022	President of the Philippines	—N/a	PROMDI	3,663,113	6.81%	3rd	—N/a	Lost

== Filmography ==
=== Film ===
Year	Title	Role	Notes
2000	Di Ko Kayang Tanggapin	Dong	
2001	Basagan ng Mukha	Dodong	
2001	Mahal Kita... Kahit Sino Ka Pa!	Dong	
2005	Lisensyadong Kamao	Ambrocio "Bruce" Lerio	
2008	Pangarap Kong Jackpot	Abel	Segment "Sa Ngalan ng Busabos"
2008	Brown Soup Thing	Cousin Manny	
2008	Anak ng Kumander	Kumander Idel	Story
2009	Wapakman	Magno Meneses/Wapakman	35th Metro Manila Film Festival entry
2015	Manny	Himself	Documentary film
2022	Almighty Zeus	—N/a	Executive producer
TBA	Freedom Fighters	Col. Macario Peralta Jr.	
TBA	Malvar	Gen. Miguel Malvar	

=== Television ===
Year	Title	Role
2005	Kamao: Matira Ang Matibay	Host
2007–2010	Pinoy Records	Host
2009	Totoy Bato	Emmanuel
2009–2011	Show Me Da Manny	Manuel "Manny" Santos
2011–2012	Manny Many Prizes	Host
2013	Para sa 'Yo ang Laban na Ito	Host
2014–2015	MP Featuring Sport Science	Host
2017–2019	Stories for the Soul	Host
2019	ASAP Natin To'	Performer
2019	Tunay na Buhay	Guest
2022–2023	Running Man	Guest

=== TV documentary film ===
Year	Title	Role	Notes
2004	No Fear: The Manny Pacquiao Story	Himself	Video documentary – VIVA Films
2004	The People's Champion	Himself	Video documentary – VIVA Films
2006	Countdown to Pacquiao-Morales 3	Himself	TV documentary – HBO
2007	Countdown to Pacquiao-Barrera 2	Himself	TV documentary – HBO
2008	Countdown to Pacquiao-Marquez 2	Himself	TV documentary – HBO
2008	24/7: De La Hoya/Pacquiao	Himself	TV documentary – HBO
2009	24/7: Pacquiao/Hatton	Himself	TV documentary – HBO
2009	Team Pacquiao	Himself	TV documentary – GMA Network
2009	3 Kings: Viloria, Pacquiao, Donaire	Himself	TV documentary – C/S 9
2009	24/7: Pacquiao/Cotto	Himself	TV documentary – HBO
2010	Manny Pacquiao	Himself	TV documentary – BIO Channel
2010	Road to Dallas: Pacquiao vs. Clottey	Himself	TV documentary – HBO
2010	24/7: Pacquiao/Margarito	Himself	TV documentary – HBO
2011	Fight Camp 360°: Pacquiao vs. Mosley	Himself	TV documentary – Showtime
2011	24/7: Pacquiao/Marquez	Himself	TV documentary – HBO
2012	I Am Bruce Lee	Himself	TV documentary – History
2012	The Fighters	Himself	TV documentary – CNN
2012	24/7: Pacquiao/Bradley	Himself	TV documentary – HBO
2012	24/7: Pacquiao/Marquez 4	Himself	TV documentary – HBO
2013	24/7: Pacquiao/Rios	Himself	TV documentary – HBO
2014	24/7: Pacquiao/Bradley 2	Himself	TV documentary – HBO
2014	24/7: Pacquiao/Algieri	Himself	TV documentary – HBO
2015	Inside Mayweather vs. Pacquiao	Himself	TV documentary – Showtime
2015	At Last: Mayweather vs. Pacquiao	Himself	TV documentary – HBO
2015	Pacman: Laban Kung Laban	Himself	TV documentary – ABS-CBN
2019	All Access: Pacquiao vs. Broner	Himself	TV documentary – Showtime
2019	#NoFilter: Walang Kupas Na Kamao	Himself	TV documentary – ABS-CBN
2019	PBC Fight Camp: Pacquiao vs. Thurman	Himself	TV documentary – Fox
2021	The Reign of Manny Pacquiao	Himself	TV documentary – RB Films
2022	PBC Fight Camp: Pacquiao vs. Spence	Himself	TV documentary – Fox
2022	Pepsi, Where's My Jet?	Himself	Netflix documentary
2023	Manny Pacquiao: Unstoppable Force	Himself	TV documentary – EM Production
2025	Gloves Off: Pacquiao vs. Barrios	Himself	TV documentary – Prime Video Sports

=== Video games ===
Year	Title	Role	Notes
2005	Fight Night Round 2	Himself	Playable fighter
2006	Fight Night Round 3	Himself	Playable fighter
2009	Fight Night Round 4	Himself	Playable fighter
2011	Fight Night Champion	Himself	Playable fighter
2011	Manny Pacquiao: Pound for Pound	Himself	Main character
2015	PBA Philippine Slam!	Himself	Playable player
2017	Real Boxing: Manny Pacquiao	Himself	Main character
2021	Fighting Pride – The Manny Pacquiao Saga	Himself	Main character
2022	Manny Boxing VR	Himself	Non-playable character
2025	Undisputed	Himself	Playable fighter
2026	DigiPlus Apps Mini-games (via BingoPlus, ArenaPlus, and GameZone)	Himself	Non-playable character

=== Web shows ===
Year	Title	Role	Notes	Ref.
2025	Physical: Asia	Contestant	Team Philippines	

== Concerts ==
List of concerts, with co-headliners, dates, venues and number of performances
Title	Co-headliner(s)	Date	Venue	City	Shows	Ref.
Manny Pacquiao: A Concert for Champions	—N/a	September 1, 2019	Smart Araneta Coliseum	Quezon City	1	
Isang Tinig, Isang Lahi	Ogie Alcasid apl.de.ap Jose Mari Chan; Pilita Corrales; Moira Dela Torre; Maymay Entrata; Bamboo Manalac; Martin Nievera; David Pomeranz; Lea Salonga; Gary Valenciano; Regine Velasquez; Ian Veneracion	June 26, 2021 – June 27, 2021	Virtual	—N/a	2	
Manny Pacquiao Charity Marathon Special Live	AKB48; The Brow Beat; CyberJapan Dancers; Shō Kiryūin; MNL48	May 22, 2022	City Football Station Stadium	Tochigi	1	

== Basketball stats ==
Legend
GP	Games played	MPG	Minutes per game
FG%	Field-goal percentage	3P%	3-point field-goal percentage	FT%	Free-throw percentage
RPG	Rebounds per game	APG	Assists per game	SPG	Steals per game
BPG	Blocks per game	PPG	Points per game	**Bold**	Career high

=== PBA season-by-season averages ===
Correct as of February 18, 2018

Year	Team	GP	MPG	FG%	3P%	FT%	RPG	APG	SPG	BPG	PPG
2014–15	Kia Picanto/Carnival	4	6.1	.000	.000	**.500**	.5	**.3**	.0	.0	.3
2015–16	Mahindra Enforcer	**5**	5.3	.200	**.250**	**.500**	.4	.2	.0	.0	1.2
2016–17	Mahindra Floodbuster	1	**8.6**	**.750**	.000	.000	**1.0**	.0	.0	.0	**6.0**
Career		10	5.9	.125	.125	.400	.5	.2	.0	.0	1.3

=== UNTV Cup season-by-season averages ===
Correct as of February 2, 2019

Year	Team	GP	MPG	FG%	3P%	FT%	RPG	APG	SPG	BPG	PPG
2018–19	Senate Defenders	**1**	0	.000	.000	.000	.0	.0	.0	.0	**12.0**
Career		1	0	.000	.000	.000	.0	.0	.0	.0	12.0

== See also ==
- List of world flyweight boxing champions
- List of world super-bantamweight boxing champions
- List of world super-featherweight boxing champions
- List of world lightweight boxing champions
- List of world welterweight boxing champions
- List of world light-middleweight boxing champions
- List of boxing triple champions
- List of boxing quadruple champions
- List of boxing quintuple champions
- List of boxing sextuple champions
- List of boxing septuple champions
- List of Filipino boxing world champions
- List of left-handed boxers
- The Ring pound for pound

Olympic Games
Previous: Christopher Camat	Flagbearer for Philippines; Beijing 2008 (non-participant)	Next: Hidilyn Diaz
House of Representatives of the Philippines
Preceded by Erwin L. Chiongbian	Representative, Lone District of Sarangani; 2010–2016	Succeeded by Rogelio D. Pacquiao
Party political offices
New political party	Chairman of People's Champ Movement; 2009–present	Incumbent
Preceded by Koko Pimentel	President of PDP–Laban; 2020–2021	Succeeded by Alfonso Cusi
Vacant Title last held by Lito Osmeña	PROMDI nominee for President of the Philippines; 2022	Most recent
