= Bobby Pacquiao =

Filipino boxer & politician (born 1980)

Member of the House of Representatives for OFW Family Club
- In office June 30, 2019 – June 30, 2022

Member of the General Santos City Council
- Incumbent
- Assumed office December 2023 ex officio
- Sector: Liga ng mga Barangay
- In office June 30, 2016 – June 30, 2019
Barangay offices
President of the Liga ng mga Barangay of General Santos
Incumbent
Assumed office c. November or December 2023
Barangay captain of Labangal
Incumbent
Assumed office October 31, 2023
Preceded by	Reynaldo Clapis
Barangay councilor of Labangal
In office November 30, 2013 – June 30, 2016

Personal details
- Born: Alberto Dapidran Pacquiao; April 23, 1980 (age 46) General Santos, South Cotabato, Philippines
- Party: OFW Family Club (2018–present)
- Other political affiliations: People's Champ Movement (until 2019)
- Spouse: Lorelie Geronimo
- Relatives: Manny Pacquiao (brother); Ruel Pacquiao (brother); Jinkee Pacquiao (sister-in-law)
- Occupation: Politician and boxer
- Boxing career
- Nickname: The Sniper
- Height: 5 ft 6 in (168 cm)
- Weight: Super-bantamweight; Featherweight; Super-featherweight; Lightweight
- Reach: 68 in (173 cm)
- Stance: Southpaw

Boxing record
- Total fights: 49
- Wins: 31
- Win by KO: 16
- Losses: 15
- Draws: 3

Alberto "Bobby" Dapidran Pacquiao (locally [pɐkˈjaʊ]; born April 23, 1980) is a Filipino politician and former professional boxer who competed from 1997 to 2008. In the super featherweight division, he held the Philippine Games and Amusements Board (GAB) title from 2002 to 2004 and the WBC Continental Americas title from 2005 until his 2006 disqualification loss to Héctor Velázquez for repeated low blows. Moving up to the lightweight division, he won the WBO Asia-Pacific title in 2008.

After retiring from boxing, he joined politics. He served as a councilor in his hometown, General Santos, from 2016 to 2019. He was then elected to the House of Representatives, serving as the party-list representative for OFW Family Club from 2019 until their loss in the 2022 election. Since 2023 he has been serving as the barangay captain of Labangal, General Santos and ex officio member of the city council by virtue of being the city's president of the Liga ng mga Barangay (LNB). He is running for a seat in the House of Representatives as the second nominee of the 1-Pacman Party List in the 2025 election.

He is a younger brother of politician and former world boxing champion Manny Pacquiao.

== Boxing career ==
Pacquiao turned professional in 1997. He won the Philippines Games and Amusements Board super featherweight title and defended it four times between 2002 and 2004. On June 17, 2005, in Cabazon, California, he defeated Carlos Navarro for the WBC Continental Americas super-featherweight title by a seventh-round technical knockout (TKO).

On June 10, 2006, he defended his title against former WBC featherweight champion Kevin Kelley.

Before a match held on November 16, 2006, to defend his title against Héctor Velázquez, Pacquiao was stripped of his title for being three pounds over the weight limit. Although the title had already been declared vacant, the fight proceeded as scheduled. During the fight, referee Kenny Bayless warned Pacquiao repeatedly for low blows before disqualifying him in the eleventh round.

He made his lightweight debut on June 9, 2007, where he fought soon-to-be WBC super-featherweight champion Humberto Soto in a ten-round bout. After sustaining a cut that impaired his vision, Pacquiao was knocked out in round seven.

Following three bouts in the lightweight division, he knocked out Decho Bankluaygym in eight rounds on August 2, 2008, for the WBO Asia-Pacific lightweight title.

On November 19, 2008, he lost by unanimous decision to North American Boxing Association champion Robert Frankel in San Jose, California. This was his last bout.

== Professional boxing record ==
49 fights	31 wins	15 losses
By knockout	16	8
By decision	15	6
By disqualification	0	1
Draws	3	

No.	Result	Record	Opponent	Type	Round, time	Date	Location	Notes
49	Loss	31–15–3	Robert Franckel	UD	10	Nov 20, 2008	HP Pavilion, San Jose, California, U.S.	
48	Win	31–14–3	Decha Kokietgym	KO	8 (12), 2:27	Aug 2, 2008	Waterfront Cebu City Hotel & Casino, Cebu City, Philippines	Won vacant WBO Asia Pacific lightweight title
47	Loss	30–14–3	Urbano Antillón	KO	1 (10), 2:49	Mar 13, 2008	Hard Rock Hotel and Casino, Paradise, Nevada, U.S.	
46	Win	30–13–3	Fernando Trejo	TKO	4 (10), 1:14	Nov 23, 2007	Morongo Casino Resort & Spa, Cabazon, California, U.S.	
45	Loss	29–13–3	Humberto Soto	KO	7 (10), 1:48	Jun 9, 2007	Madison Square Garden, New York City, New York, U.S.	
44	Loss	29–12–3	Héctor Velázquez	DQ	11 (12), 2:56	Nov 16, 2006	Hard Rock Hotel and Casino, Paradise, Nevada, U.S.	WBC Continental Americas only at stake for Velázquez as Pacquiao missed weight; Pacquiao disqualified for low blows
43	Win	29–11–3	Kevin Kelley	KO	4 (12), 1:24	Jun 10, 2008	Madison Square Garden, New York City, New York, U.S.	Retained WBC Continental Americas super featherweight title
42	Win	28–11–3	Carlos Hernández	SD	10	Oct 8, 2005	Thomas & Mack Center, Paradise, Nevada, U.S.	
41	Win	27–11–3	Carlos Navarro	KO	7 (12), 2:54	Jun 17, 2005	Table Mountain Casino, Friant, California, U.S.	Won vacant WBC Continental Americas super featherweight title
40	Loss	26–11–3	Fahprakorb Rakkiatgym	KO	9 (12)	Feb 18, 2005	Pattaya, Chonburi Province, Thailand	For IBF Pan Pacific featherweight title
39	Win	26–10–3	Óscar Villa	UD	8	Nov 12, 2004	Quiet Cannon, Montebello, California, U.S.	
38	Win	25–10–3	Baby Lorona Jr.	UD	12	Jul 21, 2004	Grand Boulevard Hotel, Manila, Philippines	Retained Philippines GAB super featherweight title
37	Draw	24–10–3	Baby Lorona Jr.	TD	2 (12)	Mar 31, 2004	Elorde Sports Center, Parañaque, Philippines	Retained Philippines GAB super featherweight title; TD: Fight stopped after Pacquiao cut from an accidental headbutt
36	Win	24–10–2	Renato Inal	KO	6 (12)	Dec 20, 2003	Subic Sports Complex, Olongapo, Philippines	Retained Philippines GAB super featherweight title
35	Win	23–10–2	Jaime Barcelona	SD	10	Nov 9, 2003	Cotabato Provincial Gymnasium, Kidapawan, Philippines	
34	Win	22–10–2	Roberto Oyan	UD	10	Sep 30, 2003	Mandaluyong Sports Center, Mandaluyong, Philippines	
33	Win	21–10–2	Baby Lorona Jr.	UD	12	May 24, 2003	Ynares Center, Antipolo, Philippines	Retained Philippines GAB super featherweight title
32	Loss	20–10–2	Baby Lorona Jr.	TKO	7 (10)	Mar 15, 2003	Luna Park Quirino Grandstand, Manila, Philippines	
31	Win	20–9–2	Baby Lorona Jr.	UD	12	Nov 20, 2002	PAGCOR Grand Theater, Parañaque, Philippines	Retained Philippines GAB super featherweight title
30	Win	19–9–2	Al Deliguer	TKO	4 (12)	Sep 1, 2002	Kidapawan City Gymnasium, Kidapawan, Philippines	Retained Philippines GAB super featherweight title
29	Win	18–9–2	Renato Inal	KO	11 (12)	Jun 15, 2002	PAGCOR Grand Theater, Parañaque, Philippines	Won vacant Philippines GAB super featherweight title
28	Win	17–9–2	Ranee Ganoy	TKO	12 (12), 2:25	Apr 6, 2002	People's Center Col. Balangabataan, Balanga, Philippines	
27	Win	16–9–2	Richard Cabillo	TKO	2 (10), 2:44	Feb 8, 2002	Kidapawan, Cotabato, Philippines	
26	Win	15–9–2	Rudy Tacoque	UD	10	Dec 15, 2001	Almendras Gym, Davao City, Philippines	
25	Loss	14–9–2	Raffy Aladi	UD	10	Sep 29, 2001	Baguio, Benguet, Philippines	
24	Loss	14–8–2	Jimrex Jaca	KO	1 (10)	Aug 10, 2001	Barangay Lahug, Cebu City, Philippines	
23	Loss	14–7–2	Dino Olivetti	MD	12	May 26, 2001	The Flash Grand Ballroom of the Elorde Sports Complex, Parañaque, Philippines	For Philippines GAB super bantamweight title
22	Win	14–6–2	Jerome Arsolon	TKO	2 (8), 2:00	May 12, 2001	General Santos, Cotabato del Sur, Philippines	
21	Win	13–6–2	Isagani Perez	PTS	10	Oct 17, 2000	Angeles City, Pampanga, Philippines	
20	Win	12–6–2	Jorge Dico	UD	6	Jun 28, 2000	Araneta Coliseum, Quezon City, Philippines	
19	Loss	11–6–2	Dino Olivetti	KO	7 (12)	Mar 4, 2000	Ninoy Aquino Stadium, Manila, Philippines	For Philippines GAB super bantamweight title
18	Win	11–5–2	Felipe Longakit	KO	1	Dec 14, 1999	Plaridel, Bulacan, Philippines	
17	Loss	10–5–2	Raffy Aladi	KO	2 (10), 2:34	Sep 11, 199	La Trinidad, Benguet, Philippines	
16	Loss	10–4–2	Raffy Aladi	MD	10	Jul 31, 1999	Benguet State University Gym, La Trinidad, Philippines	
15	Win	10–3–2	Isagani Perez	UD	10	Jun 22, 1999	San Andres, Manila, Philippines	
14	Win	9–3–2	Raul Cabato	RTD	5	Apr 24, 1999	Araneta Coliseum, Quezon City, Philippines	
13	Win	8–3–2	Primo Erasan	KO	4	Feb 20, 1999	Provincial Sports Complex, Kidapawan, Philippines	
12	Win	7–3–2	Dodong Sales	KO	5	Nov 22, 1998	Philippines	
11	Win	6–3–2	Jovan Villegas	PTS	6	Sep 19, 1998	Philippines	
10	Draw	5–3–2	Arman Pedemonte	PTS	6	Jul 18, 1998	Mandaluyong Sports Center, Mandaluyong, Philippines	
9	Win	5–3–1	Dodong Sales	SD	6	May 27, 1998	Tondo Sports Center, Manila, Philippines	
8	Loss	4–3–1	Isagani Perez	TKO	1, 1:54	Mar 18, 1998	Trece Martires Center, Trece Martires, Philippines	
7	Win	4–2–1	Jimmy Española	PTS	4	Dec 6, 1997	Philippines	
6	Loss	3–2–1	Marlon Castañeda	PTS	4	Sep 19, 1997	Philippines	
5	Loss	3–1–1	Sairung Singwancha	PTS	10	Aug 30, 1997	Indoor Provincial Stadium, Nong Khai, Thailand	
4	Win	3–0–1	Daniel Anib	PTS	4	Aug 23, 1997	Philippines	
3	Win	2–0–1	Romeo Roledo	TKO	4	Jun 26, 1997	Philippines	
2	Draw	1–0–1	Rommel Froilan	MD	4	May 19, 1997	Philippines	
1	Win	1–0	Teddy Gan	KO	1	Apr 24, 1997	Ritsy's, Makati, Philippines	

== Professional titles ==
- Philippines Games and Amusements Board (GAB) Super Featherweight Title (2002)
- WBC Continental Americas Super Featherweight Title (2005)
- WBO Asia Pacific Lightweight Title (2008)

== Basketball career ==
=== MP Gensan Warriors (Liga Pilipinas) ===
He was included in the 16-man roster that competed in SMART-Liga Pilipinas Conference II. On his debut, he scored only two points in a 63–59 loss to the Ilocos Sur Bravehearts. On January 16, 2009, he scored 10 points in a blowout win against Zamboanga del Norte. He also wanted to play in the Tournament of the Philippines (TOP), the first joint project of Liga Pilipinas and the Philippine Basketball League, but he was instead placed on the reserve list since Manny Pacquiao wanted to suit up for the team.

=== KIA Motors (PBA) ===
On May 27, 2014, it was reported that he was among those who tried out for KIA Motors, which is coached by his brother Manny Pacquiao. Asked if he would select Bobby, his brother answered that it would be too big of a favor to give. On July 26, 2014, in an interview with Snow Badua, Pacquiao revealed that he would no longer apply for the 2014 PBA draft, focusing instead on a possible stint with the family-supported Countrywide Basketball League (CWBL) franchise.

=== MP Hotel (PBA D-League) ===
After the CWBL failed to materialize due to financial difficulties, he was then assigned as the team manager of Manny Pacquiao's PBA D-League franchise. On the team's debut, they were handed a 27-point loss by Cafe France led by Maverick Ahanmisi who had ten points. The team last competed on the 2015 PBA D-League Foundation Cup.

=== Other leagues ===
In 2011, he and his brother Manny played for the MP Warriors in the Manny Pacquiao Basketball Cup, which featured teams such as BBEAL champion University of Baguio, runner-up University of the Cordilleras, Cordillera College from La Trinidad, Chesaa 2011 men's basketball champion Baguio College of Technology. On one of the games, he scored 10 points while Manny scored 124. The tournament was staged in the middle of Manny Pacquiao's preparation against Shane Mosley. In March 2013, his team the MP Warriors, then coached by Arvin Bonleon, won a P300,000 prize after defeating the Celebrity team led by Gerald Anderson. In 2014, the MP Warriors ruled the Kalilangan Festival Commercial basketball league in February by beating Kadayawan sa Dabaw Invitational Commercial champion Gold Star Davao. Pacquiao's team also finished first runner-up in the Araw ng Dabaw Invitational Open league in March.

== Politics ==
In the 2013 barangay elections, Pacquiao sought a seat in the village council of Labangal in General Santos, where his wife Lorelei was the chairperson. He won and became village councilor while his wife was re-elected as chairman. He ran under the People's Champ Movement (PCM), a local political party founded by Manny Pacquiao. In the 2016 elections, he sought a position in the city council of General Santos and finished 2nd among 36 candidates with 95,052 votes, subsequently being proclaimed one of the 12 councilors of the city.

=== House of Representatives (2019–2022) ===
For the 2019 general election, he was nominated by OFW Family Club, a political organization seeking party-list representation in the House of Representatives for overseas Filipino workers, as their first nominee. The group received only 200,881 votes, amounting to 0.72% of the national vote, which did not meet the 2% threshold required for an automatic seat allocation. However, as not all 59 seats were filled through this method, the remaining seats were distributed to parties that, although below the threshold, had garnered sufficient votes to secure a place among the top. OFW Family Club was included, albeit positioned near the end of the allocation, leading to Pacquiao being proclaimed as a member of the House of Representatives.

In the 18th Congress of the Philippines, Pacquiao was a member of the following committees:

- Philippine House Committee on Mindanao Affairs (Vice Chairperson)
- Philippine House Committee on Overseas Workers Affairs (Vice Chairperson)
- Philippine House Committee on Youth and Sports Development (Vice Chairperson)
- Philippine House Committee on Foreign Affairs (Member for the Majority)
- Philippine House Committee on Games and Amusements (Member for the Majority)
- Philippine House Committee on Health (Member for the Majority)
- Philippine House Committee on National Defense and Security (Member for the Majority)

Pacquiao sought re-election in 2022; however, OFW Family Club only garnered 93,059 votes, constituting 0.25% of the national vote and placing 109th in the election results.

=== Return to local politics ===
In the 2023 barangay elections, Pacquiao vied for the position of barangay chairman of Labangal, a role previously held by his wife before her election as mayor of General Santos in 2022. He secured a landslide victory, garnering 17,873 votes against his lone opponent, Ramon Ciocon, who received only 1,241 votes. He then returned to the city council as an ex-officio member by virtue of being elected president of the city' Liga ng mga Barangay (LNB; English: Association of Barangay Councils (ABC))

=== Bid for House of Representatives return (2025) ===
Pacquiao is seeking a seat in the House of Representatives in the 2025 midterm elections. This time, he is running as the second nominee of the 1-Pacman Party List, the namesake party-list of his brother Manny.

== See also ==
- List of left-handed boxers
