= 1978 =

Calendar year

1978 in various calendars
- Gregorian calendar: 1978; MCMLXXVIII
- Ab urbe condita: 2731
- Armenian calendar: 1427; ԹՎ ՌՆԻԷ
- Assyrian calendar: 6728
- Baháʼí calendar: 134–135
- Balinese saka calendar: 1899–1900
- Bengali calendar: 1384–1385
- Berber calendar: 2928
- British Regnal year: 26 Eliz. 2 – 27 Eliz. 2
- Buddhist calendar: 2522
- Burmese calendar: 1340
- Byzantine calendar: 7486–7487
- Chinese calendar: 丁巳年 (Fire Snake); 4675 or 4468 — to — 戊午年 (Earth Horse); 4676 or 4469
- Coptic calendar: 1694–1695
- Discordian calendar: 3144
- Ethiopian calendar: 1970–1971
- Hebrew calendar: 5738–5739
- Hindu calendars
- Vikram Samvat: 2034–2035
- Shaka Samvat: 1899–1900
- Kali Yuga: 5078–5079
- Holocene calendar: 11978
- Igbo calendar: 978–979
- Iranian calendar: 1356–1357
- Islamic calendar: 1398–1399
- Japanese calendar: Shōwa 53 (昭和５３年)
- Javanese calendar: 1909–1910
- Juche calendar: 67
- Julian calendar: Gregorian minus 13 days
- Korean calendar: 4311
- Minguo calendar: ROC 67 民國67年
- Nanakshahi calendar: 510
- Thai solar calendar: 2521
- Tibetan calendar: མེ་མོ་སྦྲུལ་ལོ་ (female Fire-Snake); 2104 or 1723 or 951 — to — ས་ཕོ་རྟ་ལོ་ (male Earth-Horse); 2105 or 1724 or 952
- Unix time: 252460800 – 283996799

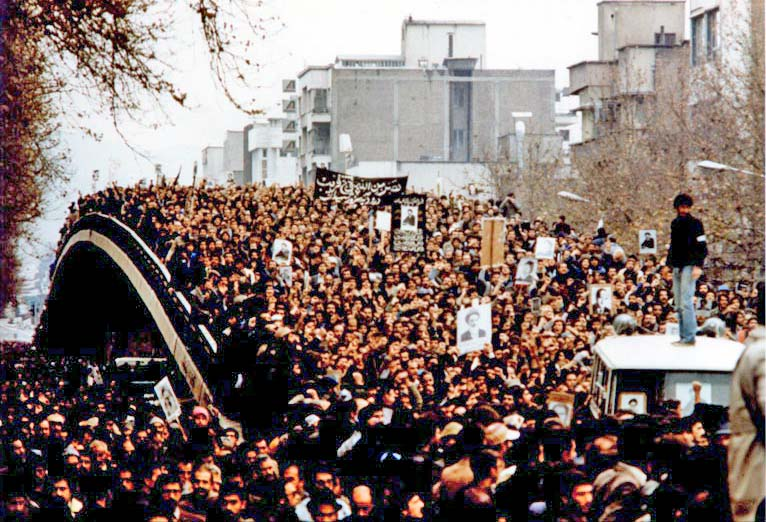
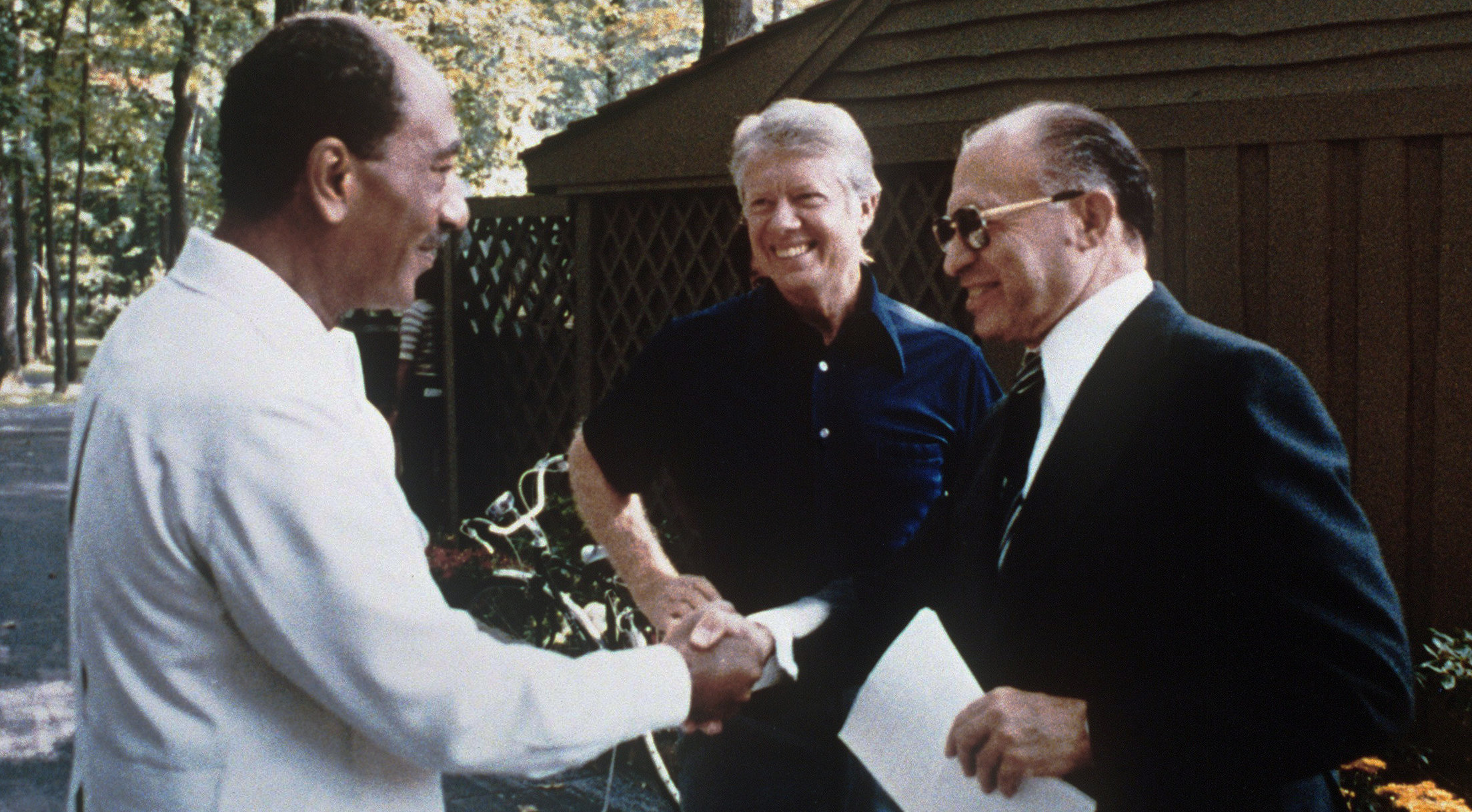
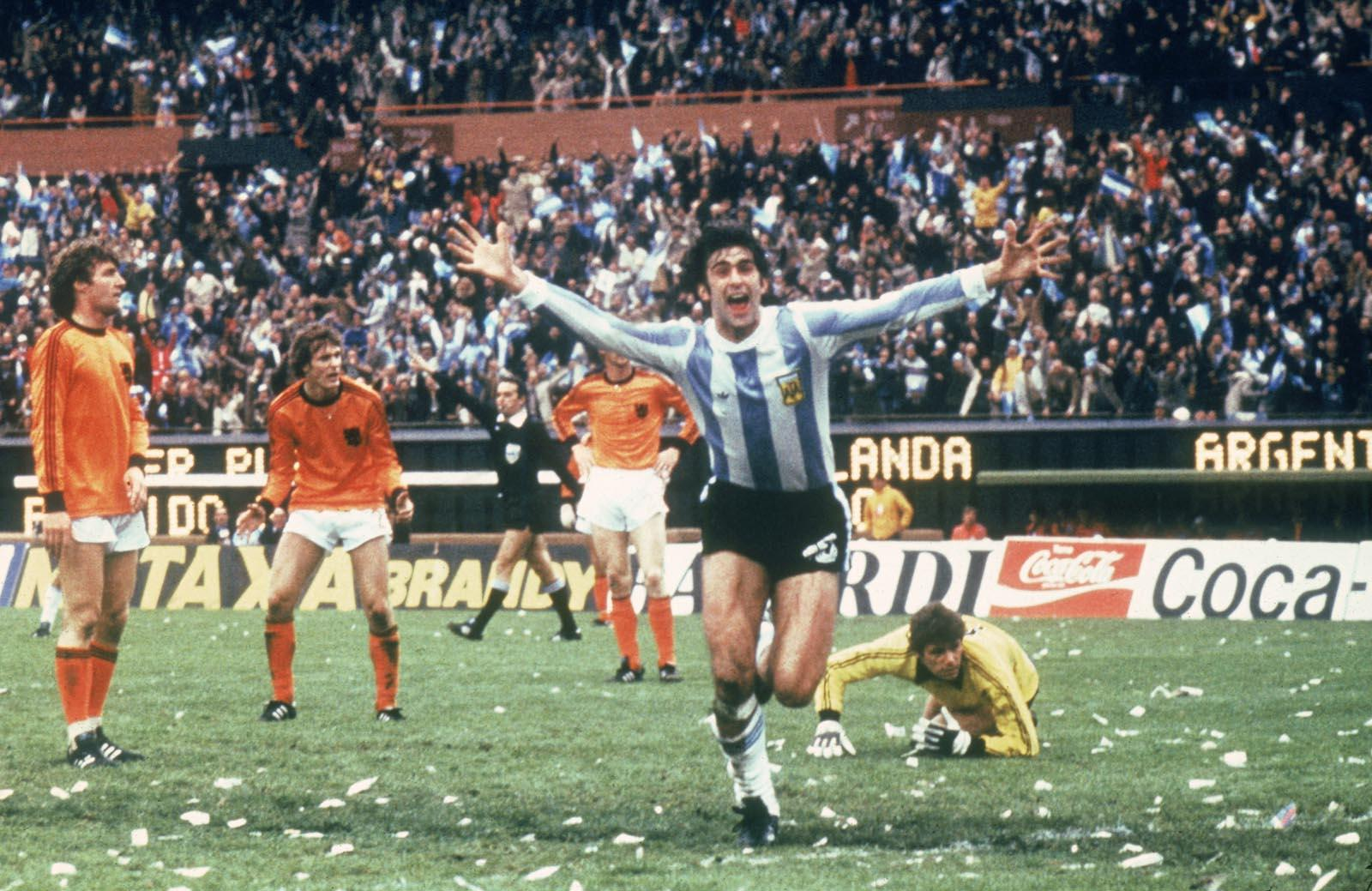
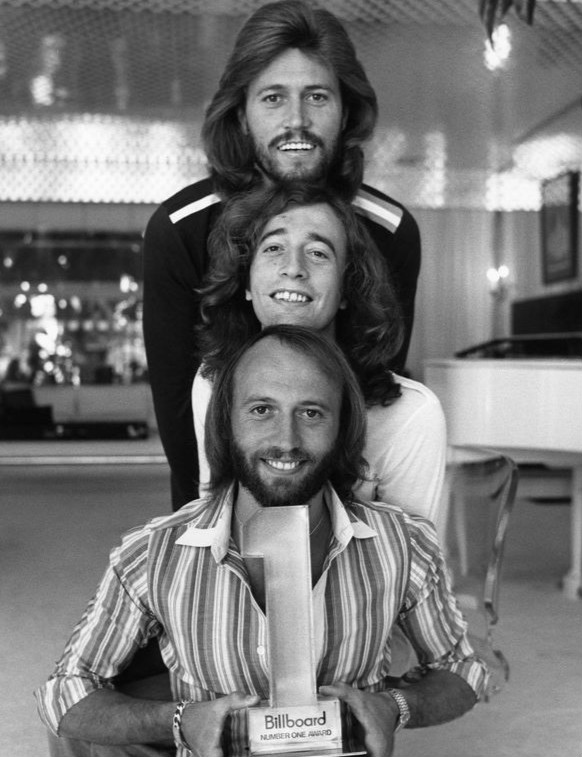
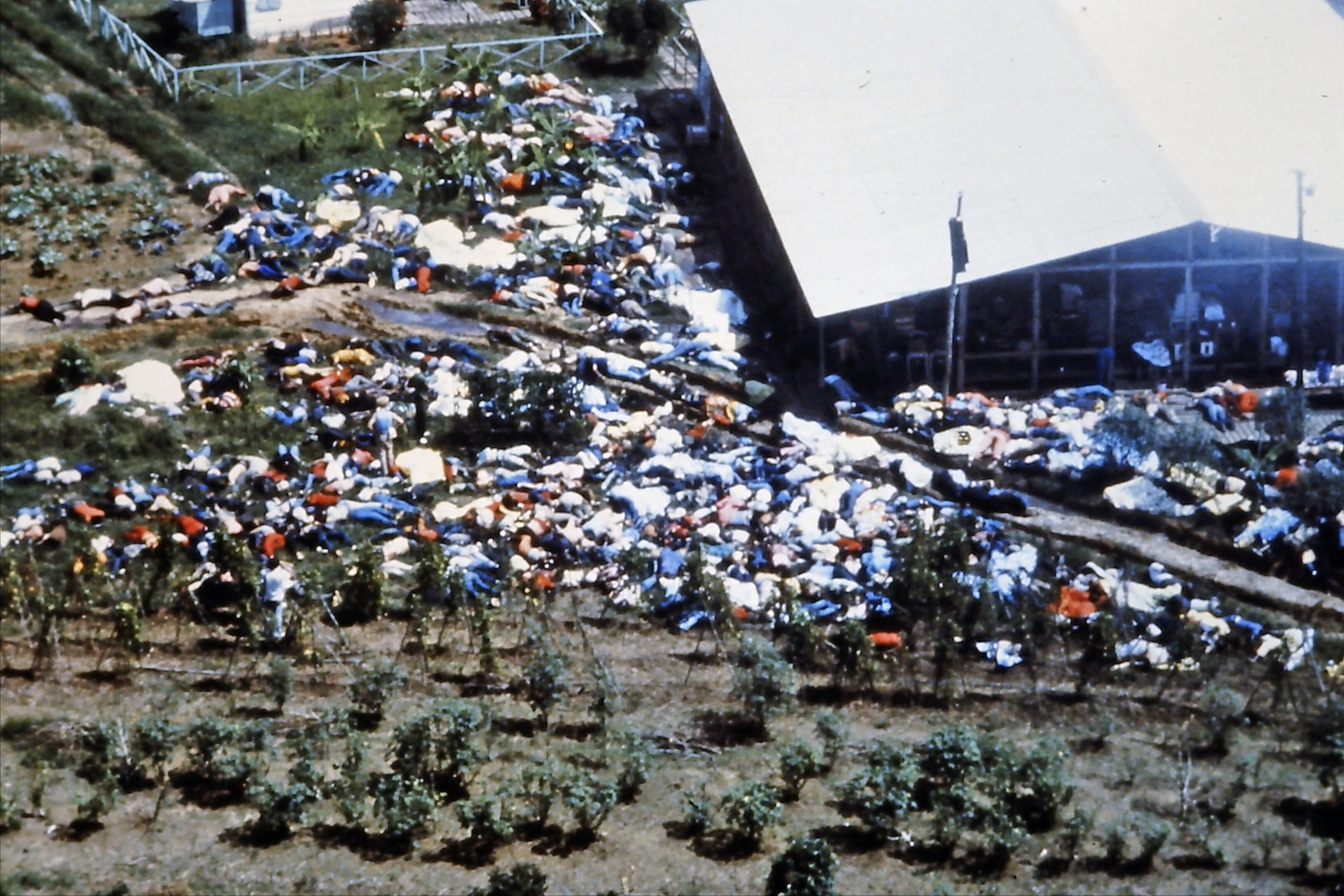
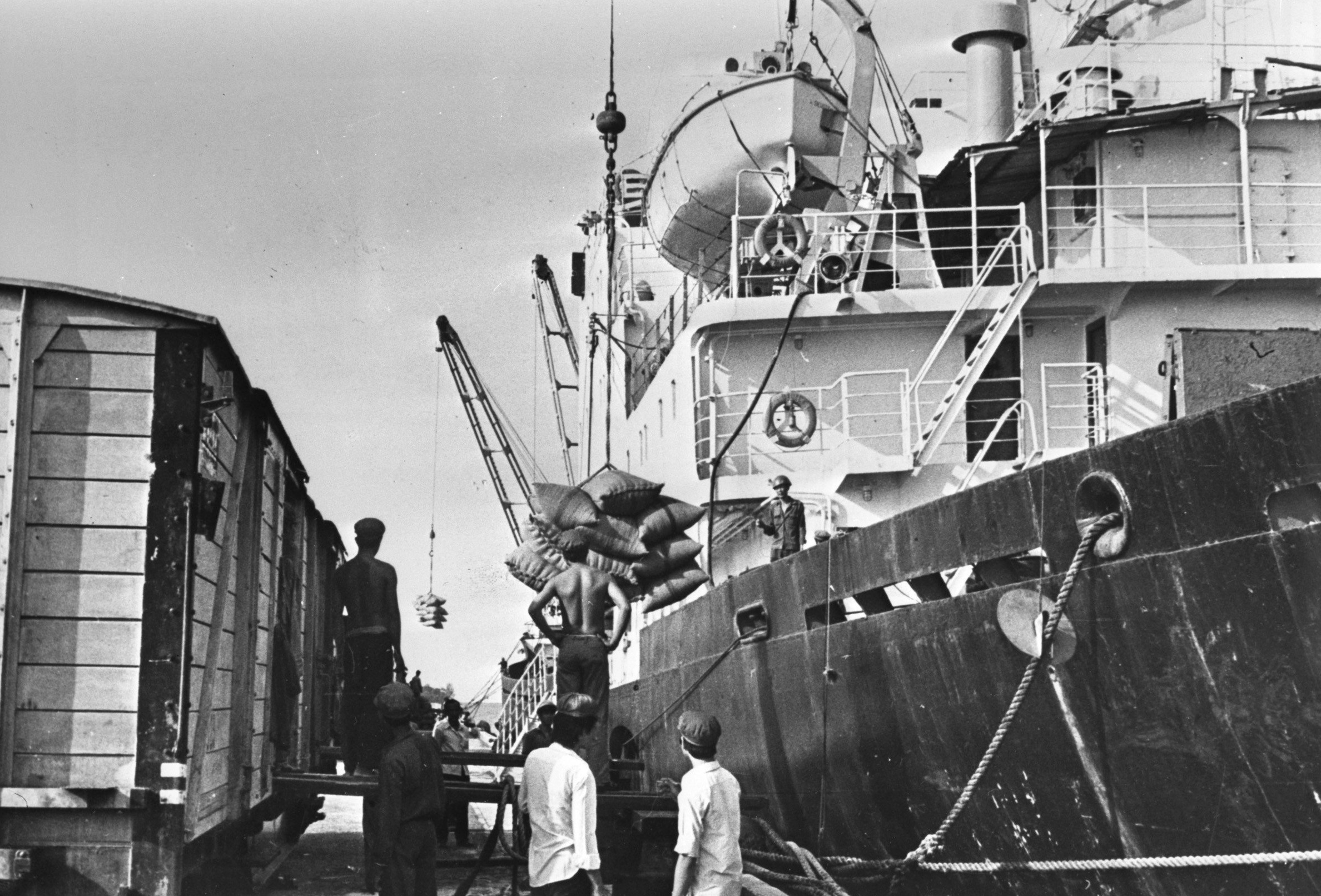
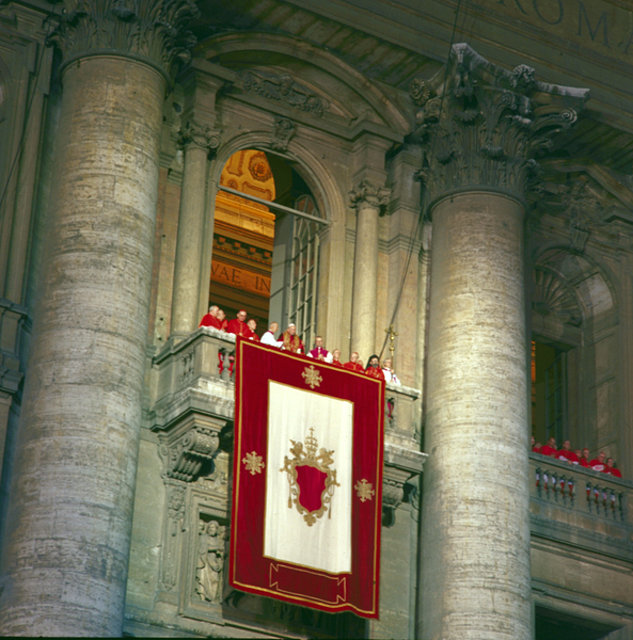
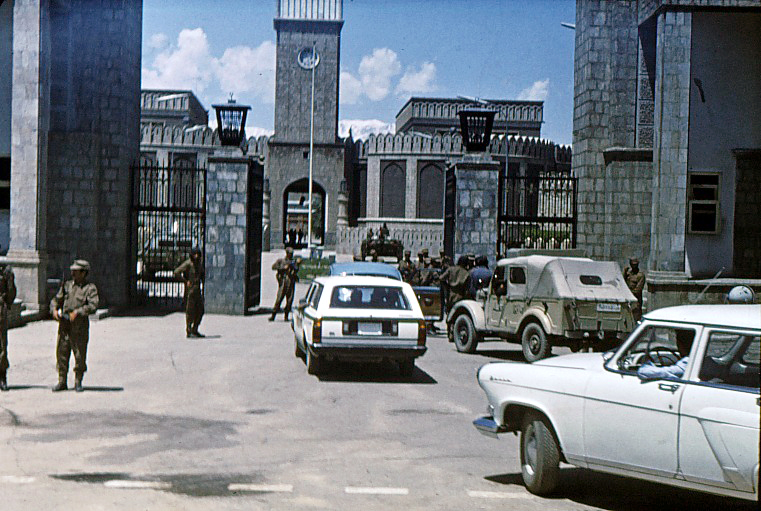
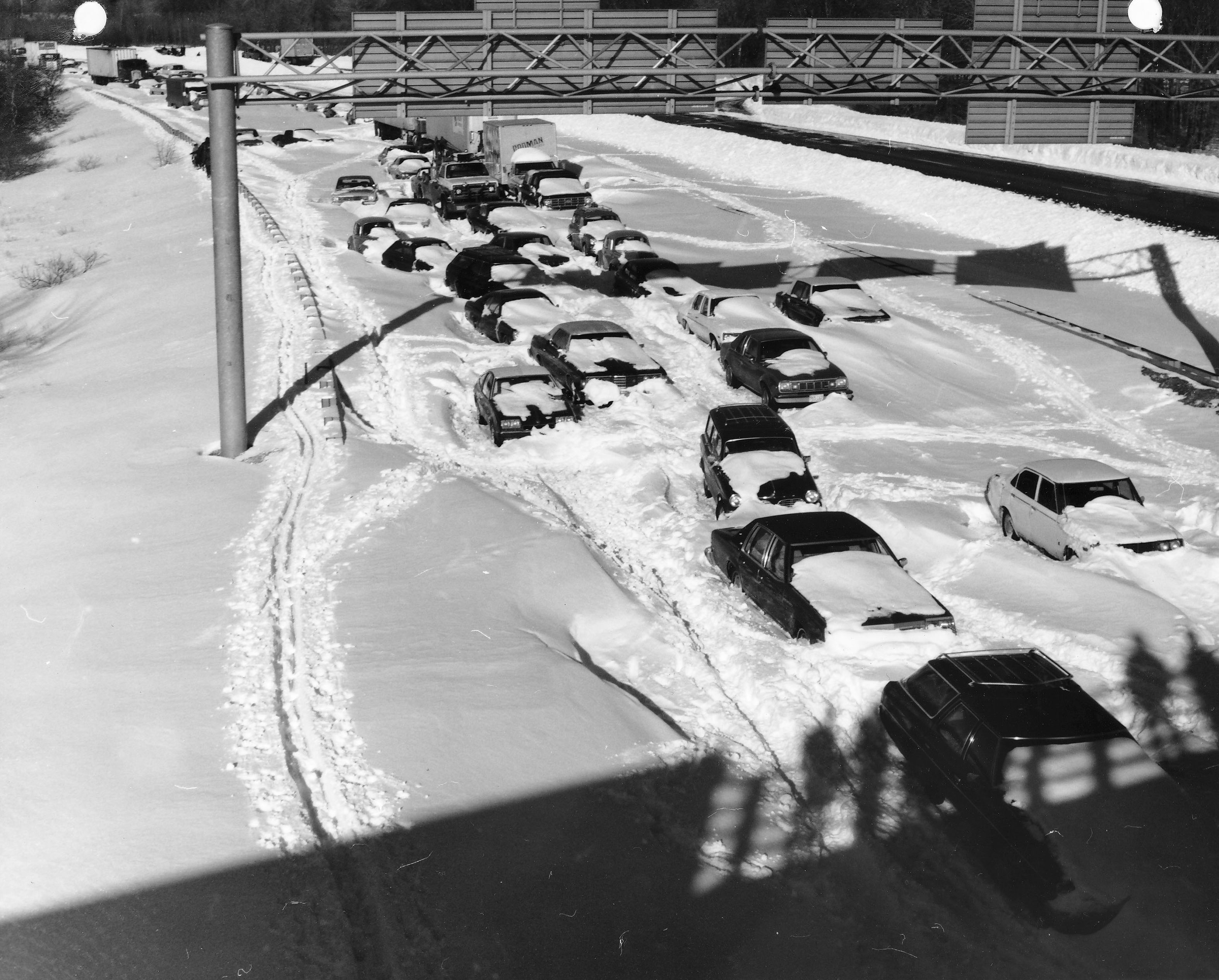
From top to bottom, left to right: the Iranian Revolution begins, culminating in toppling the Shah and bringing in the Islamic Republic under Ruhollah Khomeini in 1979; the Camp David Accords create a peace framework between Egypt and Israel; the 1978 FIFA World Cup in Argentina sees the host nation win its first title; the Bee Gees release the Saturday Night Fever soundtrack; the Jonestown massacre in Guyana kills over 900; the Cambodian–Vietnamese War begins as Vietnam invades Cambodia; Pope John Paul II becomes the first non-Italian pope in over 450 years; the Saur Revolution installs a communist government in Afghanistan; and the Northeastern United States blizzard of 1978 paralyzes the region with record snow.

1978 (MCMLXXVIII) was a common year starting on Sunday of the Gregorian calendar, the 1978th year of the Common Era (CE) and Anno Domini (AD) designations, the 978th year of the 2nd millennium, the 78th year of the 20th century, and the 9th year of the 1970s decade.

== Events ==
=== January ===
- January 1 – Air India Flight 855, a Boeing 747 passenger jet, crashes off the coast of Bombay, killing 213.
- January 5 – Bülent Ecevit, of CHP, forms the new government of Turkey (42nd government).
- January 6 – The Holy Crown of Hungary (also known as Stephen of Hungary Crown) is returned to Hungary from the United States, where it was held since World War II.
- January 10 – Pedro Joaquín Chamorro Cardenal, a critic of the Nicaraguan government, is assassinated; riots erupt against Somoza's government.
- January 18 – The European Court of Human Rights finds the British government guilty of mistreating prisoners in Northern Ireland, but not guilty of torture.
- January 22 – Ethiopia declares the ambassador of West Germany persona non grata.
- January 24
  - Soviet satellite Kosmos 954 burns up in Earth's atmosphere, scattering radioactive debris over Canada's Northwest Territories.
  - Rose Dugdale and Eddie Gallagher become the first convicted prisoners to marry in prison since the establishment of the Republic of Ireland.
- January 25–27 – The Great Blizzard of 1978 strikes the Ohio Valley and Great Lakes, killing 70.

=== February ===
- February 1 – Film director Roman Polanski skips bail in the United States and flees to France, after pleading guilty to charges of engaging in sex with a 13-year-old girl.
- February 2 - the Reunion Tower opens in Dallas Texas.
- February 5–7 – The Northeastern United States blizzard of 1978 hits the New England region and the New York metropolitan area, killing about 100 people and causing over US$520 million in damage.
- February 6 – King Dragon operation in Arakan: Burmese General Ne Win targets Muslim minorities in the village of Sakkipara.
- February 8 – United States Senate proceedings are broadcast on radio for the first time.
- February 9 – The Budd Company unveils its first SPV-2000 self-propelled railcar in Philadelphia, Pennsylvania, United States.
- February 11
  - Pacific Western Airlines Flight 314, a Boeing 737-200, crashes in Cranbrook, British Columbia, Canada, killing 44 of the 50 people on board.
  - The People's Republic of China lifts a ban on works by Aristotle, William Shakespeare and Charles Dickens.
- February 13 – Sydney Hilton Hotel bombing: A bomb explodes outside the Hilton Hotel in Sydney, Australia, killing a policeman and two civilians, and injuring several other people.
- February 15 – Rhodesia, one of only two remaining white-ruled African nations (the other being South Africa), announces that it will accept multiracial democracy within 2 years.
- February 19 – Egyptian raid on Larnaca International Airport: Egyptian Special Forces attempt to rescue several hostages in Larnaca, Cyprus; 20 Egyptian commandos are injured or killed.
- February 25 – The first Legislative Assembly election is held in Arunachal Pradesh, India.
- February 27 – The first global positioning satellite, the Rockwell International-built Navstar 1, is launched by the United States.

=== March ===
- March 1 – Charlie Chaplin's remains are stolen from Cosier-sur-Vevey, Switzerland.
- March 2 – Soyuz 28 (Aleksei Gubarev, Vladimír Remek) is launched on a rendezvous with Salyut 6, with the first cosmonaut from a country other than the US or USSR (Czechoslovak Vladimír Remek).
- March 3
  - Ethiopia admits that its troops are fighting with the aid of Cuban soldiers, against Somali troops in the Ogaden.
  - Rhodesian Bush War: Rhodesia attacks Zambia.
  - The New York Post publishes an article about David Rorvik's book The Cloning of Man, about a supposed cloning of a human being.
- March 8 – The first radio episode of The Hitchhiker's Guide to the Galaxy, by Douglas Adams, is transmitted on BBC Radio 4.
- March 10 – Soyuz 28 lands.
- March 11
  - Coastal Road massacre: Palestinian terrorists kill 34 Israelis.
  - Claude François, French entertainer born 1939, dies by electrocution in his home in Paris.
- March 14 – Operation Litani: Israeli forces invade Lebanon.
- March 15 – Somalia and Ethiopia sign a truce to end the Ethio-Somali War.
- March 16 – Former Italian Premier Aldo Moro is kidnapped by the Red Brigades; 5 bodyguards are killed.
- March 17 – An oil tanker, Amoco Cadiz, runs aground on the coast of Brittany.
- March 18
  - Zulfikar Ali Bhutto, Prime Minister of Pakistan, is sentenced to death by hanging, for ordering the assassination of a political opponent.
  - California Jam II is held at the Ontario Motor Speedway in Ontario, California, attracting more than 300,000 fans.
- March 22 – Karl Wallenda of The Flying Wallendas dies, after falling off a tight-rope between two hotels in San Juan, Puerto Rico.
- March 26 – The control tower and some other facilities of New Tokyo International Airport, which were scheduled to open on March 31, are illegally occupied and damaged in a terrorist attack by New Left activists, forcing a rescheduling of its opening date to May 20.
- March 28
  - San Francisco's City Council signs the United States's most comprehensive gay rights bill.
  - Stump v. Sparkman (435 U.S. 349): The Supreme Court of the United States hands down a 5–3 decision, in a controversial case involving involuntary sterilization and judicial immunity.

=== April ===
- April 1
  - New Zealand National Airways Corporation (the domestic airline of New Zealand) is merged with New Zealand's international airline, Air New Zealand.
  - Dick Smith of Dick Smith Foods tows a fake iceberg to Sydney Harbour.
  - The Philippine College of Commerce, through a presidential decree, is converted to the Polytechnic University of the Philippines.
- April 2 – Dallas debuts on CBS, and gives birth to the modern day primetime soap opera.
- April 3 – The 50th Academy Awards are held at the Dorothy Chandler Pavilion in Los Angeles, with Annie Hall winning Best Picture.
- April 7 – U.S. President Jimmy Carter decides to postpone production of the neutron bomb, a weapon that kills people with radiation, but leaves buildings relatively intact.
- April 9 – Somali military officers stage an unsuccessful coup against the government of Siad Barre; security forces thwart the attempt within hours, and several conspirators are arrested.
- April 14 – Thousands of Georgians demonstrate against an attempt by Soviet authorities to change the constitutional status of the Georgian language.
- April 18 – The U.S. Senate votes, 68–32, to turn the Panama Canal over to Panamanian control on December 31, 1999.
- April 18– 30 – The Khmer Rouge massacres 3,157 civilians in Ba Chúc, Vietnam.
- April 20 – A Soviet air defense plane shoots down Korean Air Lines Flight 902; the plane makes an emergency landing on a frozen lake.
- April 22
  - Izhar Cohen & the Alphabeta win the Eurovision Song Contest 1978 for Israel with their song A-Ba-Ni-Bi.
  - The One Love Peace Concert is held at National Heroes Stadium in Kingston, Jamaica.
- April 25 – St. Paul, Minnesota becomes the second U.S. city to repeal its gay rights ordinance, after Anita Bryant's successful 1977 anti-gay campaign in Miami-Dade County, Florida.
- April 27
  - Saur Revolution – Afghanistan's president Mohammad Daoud Khan and his family are murdered; Nur Muhammad Taraki succeeds him, beginning the Afghan conflict.
  - Willow Island disaster – In the deadliest construction accident in United States history, 51 construction workers are killed when a cooling tower under construction collapses at the Pleasants Power Station in Willow Island, West Virginia.
- April 30 – The "Democratic Republic of Afghanistan" is proclaimed, under pro-communist leader Nur Muhammad Taraki.

=== May ===
- May 4
  - South African Border War: The Battle of Cassinga occurs in southern Angola.
  - Communist activist Henri Curiel is murdered in Paris.
- May 8
  - Norway opens a natural gas field, in the Polar Sea.
  - Reinhold Messner (Italy) and Peter Habeler (Austria) make the first ascent of Mount Everest, without supplemental oxygen.
- May 9 – In Rome, the corpse of former Italian prime minister Aldo Moro, is found in a red Renault 4.
- May 12 – Shaba II: In Zaire, rebels occupy the city of Kolwezi, the mining centre of the province of Shaba. The Zairean government asks the U.S., France and Belgium to restore order.
- May 12–13 – A group of mercenaries, led by Bob Denard, oust Ali Soilih in the Comoros; ten local soldiers are killed. Denard forms a new government.
- May 17 – Charlie Chaplin's coffin is found some 15 kilometres (9.3 mi) from the cemetery from which it was stolen, near Lake Geneva.
- May 18
  - Soviet dissident Yuri Orlov is sentenced to 7 years' hard labor, for distributing 'counterrevolutionary material'.
  - Sarajevo is selected to host the 1984 Winter Olympics, and Los Angeles is selected to host the 1984 Summer Olympics.
- May 18–19 – Belgian and French paratroopers fly to Zaire, to aid the fight against the rebels.
- May 19–20 – French Foreign Legion paratroopers land in Kolwezi, Zaire, to rescue Europeans in the middle of a civil war.
- May 20 – Mavis Hutchinson, 53, becomes the first woman to run across the U.S.; her trek took 69 days.
- May 22 – Exiled leaders Ahmed Abdallah and Muhammad Ahmad return to the Comoros.
- May 26 – In Atlantic City, New Jersey, Resorts International, the first legal casino in the eastern United States, opens.
- May 28 – Indianapolis 500: Al Unser wins his third race, and the first for car owner Jim Hall.
- May 29 – Ali Soilih is found dead in the Comoros, allegedly shot when trying to escape.

=== June ===
- June 1 – The 1978 FIFA World Cup starts in Argentina.
- June 2 – Japan Air Lines 115 had its tail struck on the runway on the airport it landed in. The same aircraft would be involved in a 2nd accident 7 years later
- June 10 – Affirmed holds off Alydar to win the Belmont Stakes and becomes the last horse to win the U.S. Triple Crown of Horse Racing until 2015.
- June 15 – King Hussein of Jordan marries 26-year-old Lisa Halaby, who takes the name Queen Noor.
- June 19
  - England cricketer Ian Botham becomes the first man in the history of the game to score a century and take eight wickets in one innings of a Test match.
  - Garfield's first comic strip, originally published locally as Jon in 1976, goes into nationwide syndication.
- June 20 – The 6.2 M_{w} Thessaloniki earthquake shakes Northern Greece with a maximum Mercalli intensity of IX (Violent). Fifty people were killed.
- June 21
  - A shootout between Provisional IRA members and the British Army in Northern Ireland leaves one civilian and three IRA men dead.
  - 1978 Iranian Chinook shootdown: Iranian helicopters stray into Soviet airspace and are shot down.
- June 22 – Charon, a satellite of Pluto, is discovered.
- June 24 – The Gay & Lesbian Solidarity March is held in Sydney, Australia to mark the 9th Anniversary of the Stonewall riots (which later becomes the annual Sydney Gay and Lesbian Mardi Gras; later incorporating a festival).
- June 25
  - Argentina defeats the Netherlands 3–1 after extra time to win the 1978 FIFA World Cup.
  - The rainbow flag of the LGBT movement flies for the first time (in its original form) at the San Francisco Gay Freedom Day Parade.
- June 26 – A bombing by Breton nationalists causes destruction in the Palace of Versailles.
- June 30 – Ethiopia begins a massive offensive in Eritrea.

=== July ===
- July 1 – Australia's Northern Territory is granted self-government.
- July 3 – The Amazon Co-operation Treaty (ACT) is signed.
- July 7 – The Solomon Islands become independent from the United Kingdom.
- July 11 – At least 217 tourists die in an explosion of a tanker-truck at a campsite in Costa Daurada, Spain.
- July 24 – In Acapulco, Mexico, Margaret Gardiner of South Africa is crowned Miss Universe.
- July 25 – Louise Brown, the world's first test tube baby, is born in Oldham, Greater Manchester, UK.
- Day unknown - Taito's Space Invaders is released in Japan. It quickly becomes one of the most successful video games of all time, both critically and commercially.

=== August ===
- August 12 – The Treaty of Peace and Friendship between Japan and the People's Republic of China is concluded.
- August 17 – Double Eagle II becomes the first balloon to successfully cross the Atlantic Ocean, flying from Presque Isle, Maine, to Miserey, France.
- August 22
  - Sandinistas seize the Nicaraguan National Palace.
  - Kenya's first president and founding father, Jomo Kenyatta, dies aged 89 in Mombasa.
- August 26 – Pope John Paul I succeeds Pope Paul VI as the 263rd Pope.

=== September ===
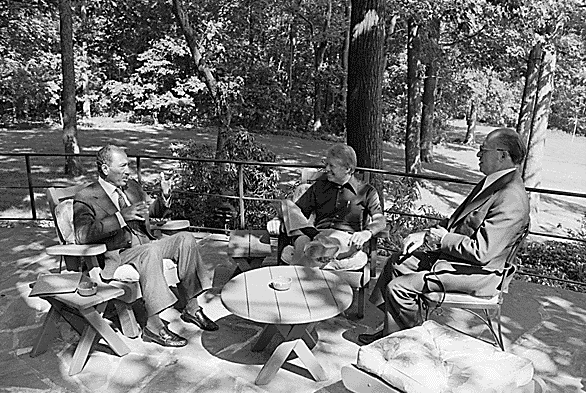
September 6: Anwar Sadat, Jimmy Carter, and Menachem Begin meet on the Aspen Cabin patio at Camp David.

- September 5 – Camp David Accords: Hosted by U.S. President Jimmy Carter, Israel's Prime Minister Menachem Begin and Egypt's President Anwar Sadat met at Camp David in Maryland to discuss a peace agreement between the two nations.
- September 7 – In London, UK, a poison-filled pellet, supposedly injected using an umbrella, fatally poisons Bulgarian defector Georgi Markov; he dies four days later.
- September 8 – Iranian Army troops open fire on rioters in Tehran, killing 122, wounding over 200.
- September 12 – The Declaration of Alma Ata is signed and released in the Capital City of Kazakh, USSR. Known as the core document on Primary Health Care Practices and Equity in Healthcare, it paved the way for the modern-day State-sponsored Healthcare System.
- September 16
  - The 7.4 M_{w} Tabas earthquake killed at least 15,000 people in the city of Tabas in Iran. The quake was measured with a maximum Mercalli intensity of IX (Violent).
  - General Muhammad Zia-ul-Haq officially assumes the post of President of Pakistan.
- September 17 – The Camp David Accords are signed between Israel and Egypt.
- September 19 – The Solomon Islands join the United Nations.
- September 20 – General Rahimuddin Khan assumes the post of martial law Governor of Balochistan.
- September 25 – PSA Flight 182, a Boeing 727, collides with a small private airplane and crashes in San Diego, California; 144 are killed.
- September 27 – The last Forest Brother guerrilla movement fighter is discovered and killed in Estonia.
- September 28 – Pope John Paul I dies after only 33 days as the Roman Catholic Pontiff.
- September 30 – Finnair Flight 405 aircraft is hijacked by Aarno Lamminparras in Oulu, Finland.
- September – Attempted poisoning of 500 members of the African National Congress by South African government infiltrators.
- September – Serial criminal Lawrence Singleton commits heinous crime against Mary Vincent.

=== October ===
- October 1
  - Vietnam attacks Cambodia.
  - Tuvalu becomes independent from the United Kingdom.
- October 2 – Mommie Dearest, written by Christina Crawford that discusses her adoptive mother Joan Crawford's abusive nature, is published. It is the first celebrity tell-all memoir.
- October 5 – Brother Eddie Villanueva and 15 others from the Polytechnic University of the Philippines begin the Jesus Is Lord Church.
- October 7 – Wranslide in New South Wales: the Wran government is re-elected with an increased majority.
- October 8 – Australia's Ken Warby sets the current world water speed record of 317.6 mph (511.13 km/h) at Blowering Dam, Australia.
- October 9 – P.W. Botha succeeds John Vorster as Prime Minister of South Africa.
- October 10
  - Daniel arap Moi becomes president of Kenya.
  - John Vorster becomes State President of South Africa.
  - A massive short circuit in Seasat's electrical system ends the satellite's scientific mission.
- October 13 – The Soviet Union launches a major Russification campaign throughout all union republics.
- October 16 – Pope John Paul II succeeds Pope John Paul I as the 264th pope, resulting in the first Year of Three Popes since 1605. He is the first Polish pope in history, and the first non-Italian pope since Pope Adrian VI (1522–1523).
- October 18 – Thorbjörn Fälldin steps down as Prime Minister of Sweden, and is succeeded by Ola Ullsten, the Leader of the liberal People's Party ("Folkpartiet").
- October 20 – The first Sydney Gay and Lesbian Mardi Gras is held as a protest march and commemoration of the Stonewall riots.
- October 21 – Australian civilian pilot Frederick Valentich vanishes in a Cessna 182 Skylane over the Bass Strait south of Melbourne, after reporting contact with an unidentified aircraft.
- October 27 – Egyptian President Anwar Sadat and Israeli Prime Minister Menachem Begin win the Nobel Peace Prize for their progress toward achieving a Middle East accord.
- October 31 – The South African Railways sets a still unbeaten world rail speed record on Cape gauge.

=== November ===
- November 2: 8:00 pm – The Republic of Ireland's second television channel RTÉ 2 goes on air (renamed Network 2, 1988; RTÉ Network Two, 1995; N2, 1997; and RTÉ Two in 2004).
- November 3 – Dominica gains its independence from the United Kingdom.
- November 5 – Indira Gandhi is elected to the Indian parliament for the first time in 20 months after winning a by-election.
- November 18 – In Guyana, Jim Jones leads his Peoples Temple cult in a mass murder–suicide in his commune, Jonestown, that claims 918 lives in all, 909 of them at Jonestown itself, including over 270 children. Representative Leo J. Ryan is assassinated by members of Peoples Temple shortly beforehand.
- November 24 – China starts an experimental "household responsibility system", in Anhui Province.
- November 26 – Two British commercial divers, Michael Ward and Tony Prangley, die of hypothermia and drowning in the East Shetland Basin after their diving bell plunges to the seabed at a depth of over 100 metres (330 ft).
- November 27 – Moscone-Milk assassinations: San Francisco Mayor George Moscone and Supervisor Harvey Milk are assassinated by disgruntled former Supervisor Dan White.

=== December ===
- December 4 – Dianne Feinstein succeeds the murdered George Moscone, to become the first woman mayor of San Francisco; she will remain in office until January 8, 1988.
- December 6 – Spanish transition to democracy: The Spanish Constitution officially restores the country's democratic government.
- December 16
  - Train 87 from Nanjing to Xining collides with train 368 from Xi'an to Xuzhou near Yangzhuang railway station in China, killing 106, injuring 218.
  - The Mystery of Mamo is released in cinemas in Japan.
- December 19 – Former Prime Minister of India Indira Gandhi is arrested and jailed for a week for breach of privilege and contempt of parliament.
- December 22
  - The pivotal Third Plenum of the 11th National Congress of the Chinese Communist Party is held in Beijing, with Deng Xiaoping reversing Mao-era policies to pursue the reform and opening up.
  - Chicago serial killer John Wayne Gacy, who was subsequently convicted of the murder of 33 young men and boys committed between 1972 and 1978, is arrested.
  - Argentina begins Operation Soberanía against Chile, but Argentinian forces quickly withdraw.
- December 25 – Vietnam launches a major offensive against the Khmer Rouge of Cambodia.
- December 27 – The Constitution of Spain is approved in a referendum, officially ending 40 years of military dictatorship.

=== Date unknown ===
- Myriodontium keratinophilum is first isolated in Italy during the screening of soil microbes.
- Synthetic insulin is developed.
- Romanian painter Doina Bumbea is abducted by the North Korean government.
- Abortion is legalized in Italy for the first time.

== Births ==
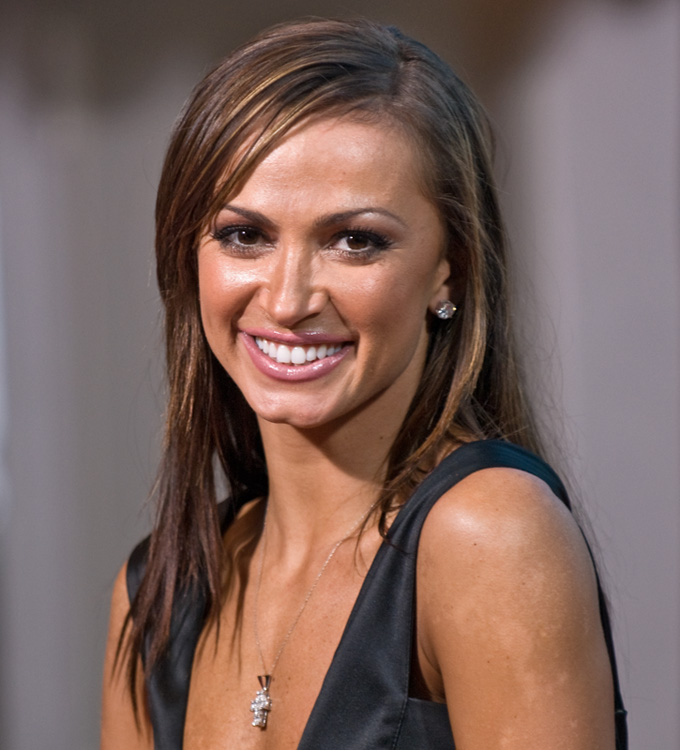
Karina Smirnoff

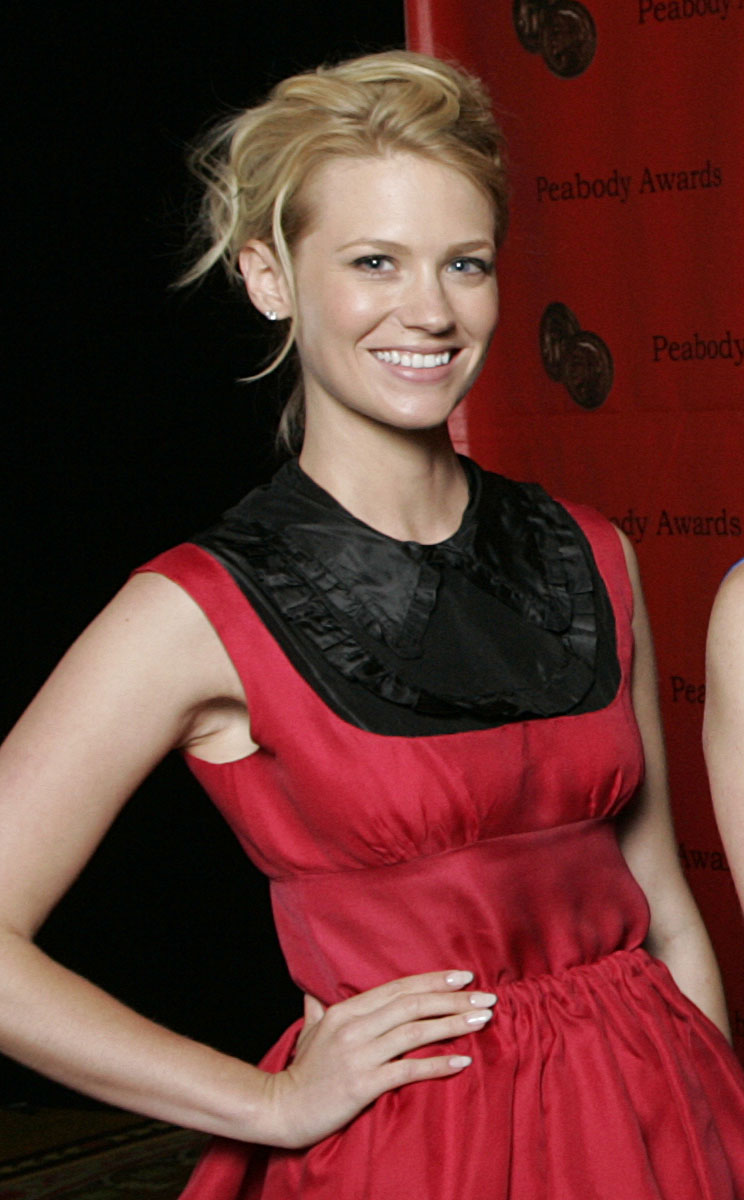
January Jones

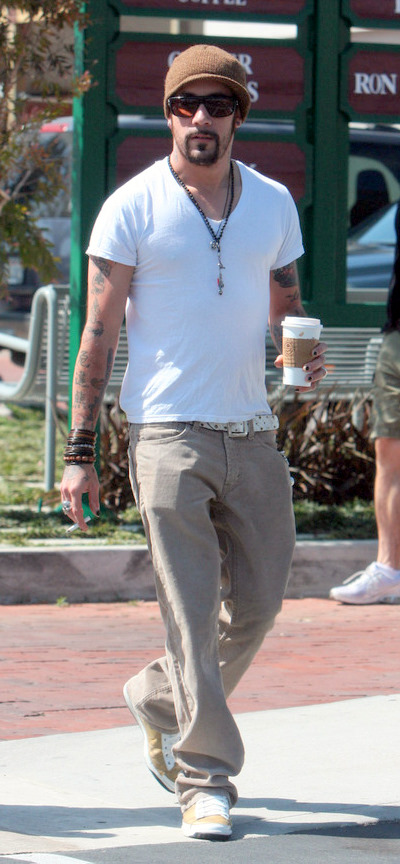
AJ McLean

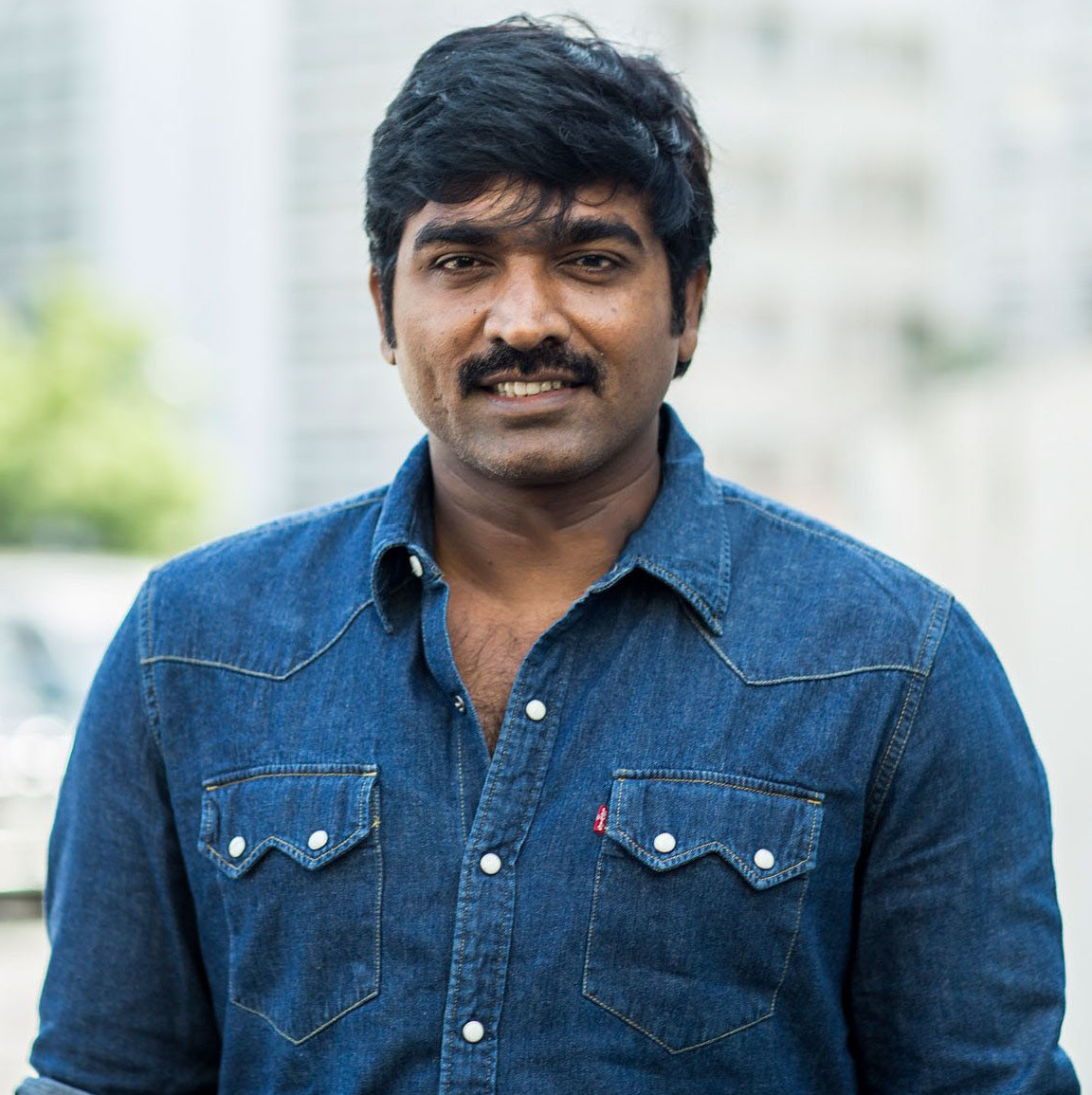
Vijay Sethupathi

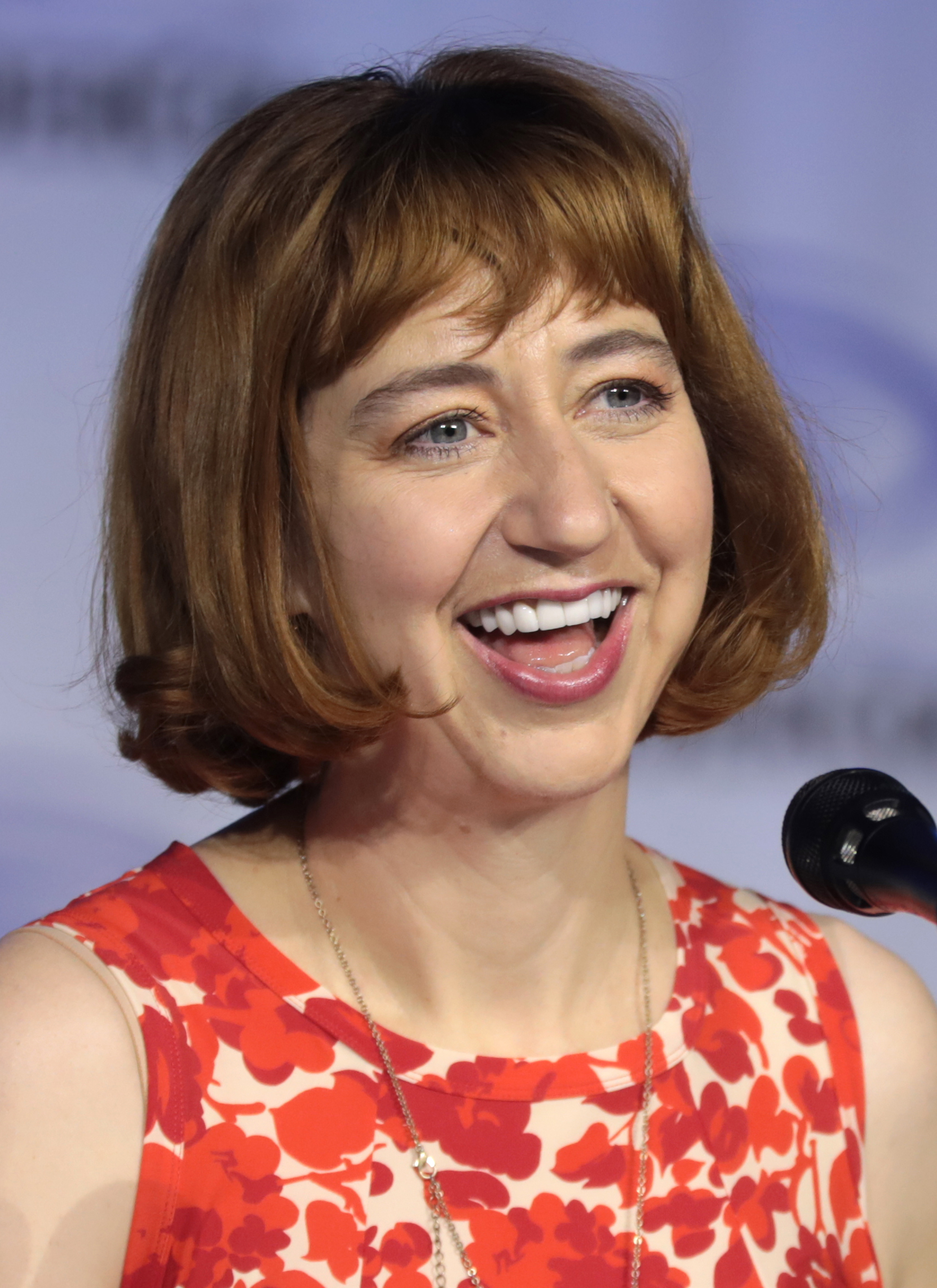
Kristen Schaal

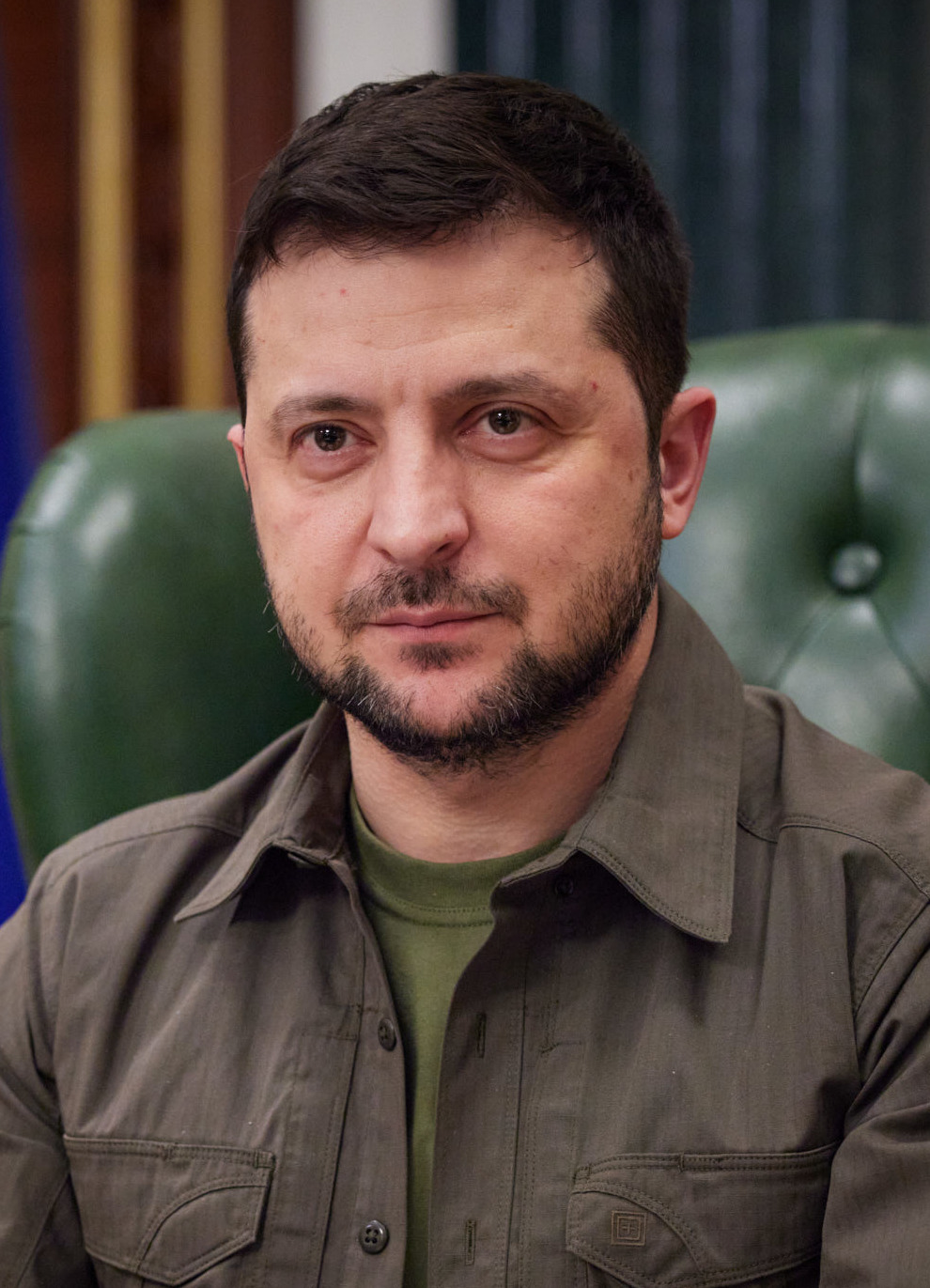
Volodymyr Zelenskyy

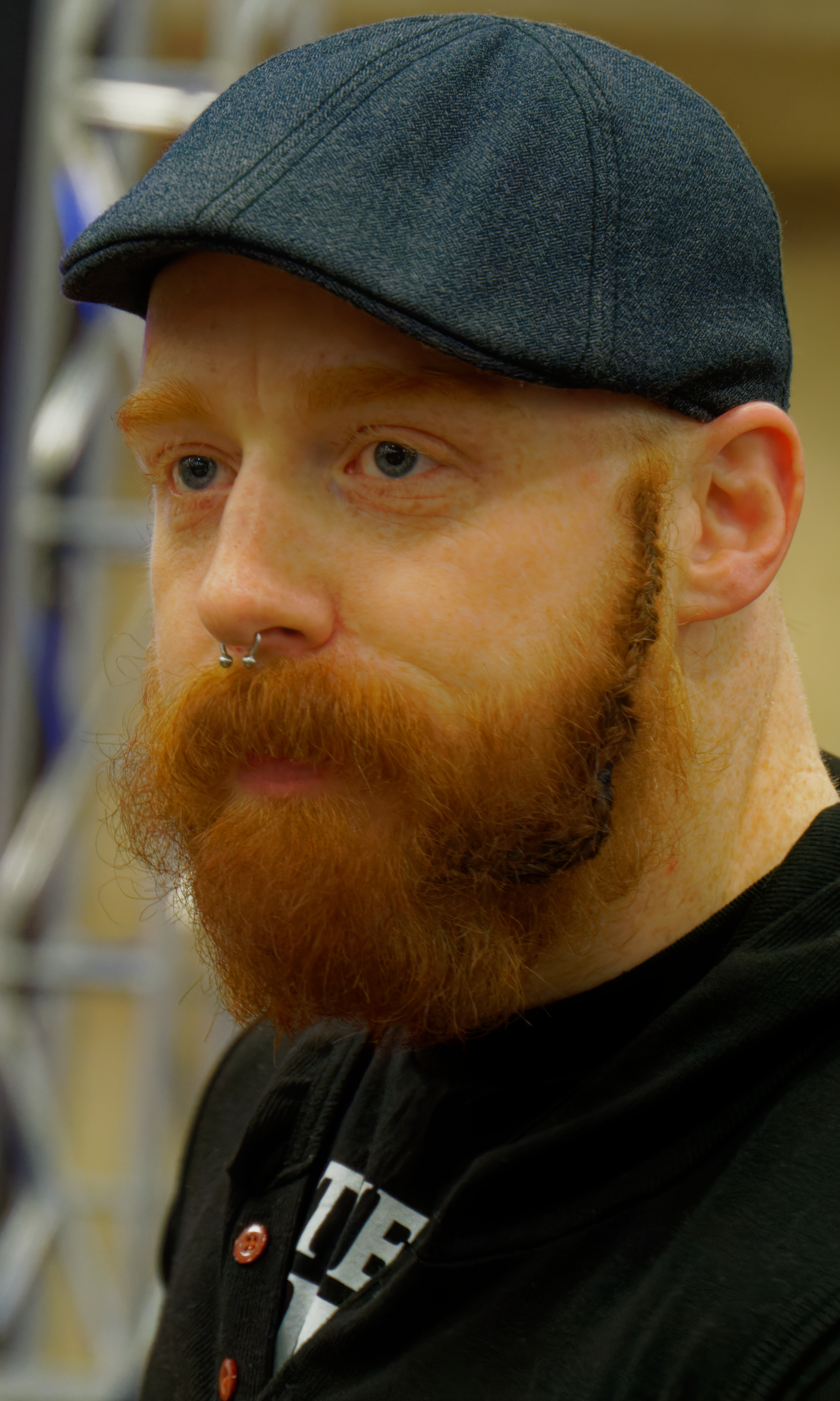
Sheamus

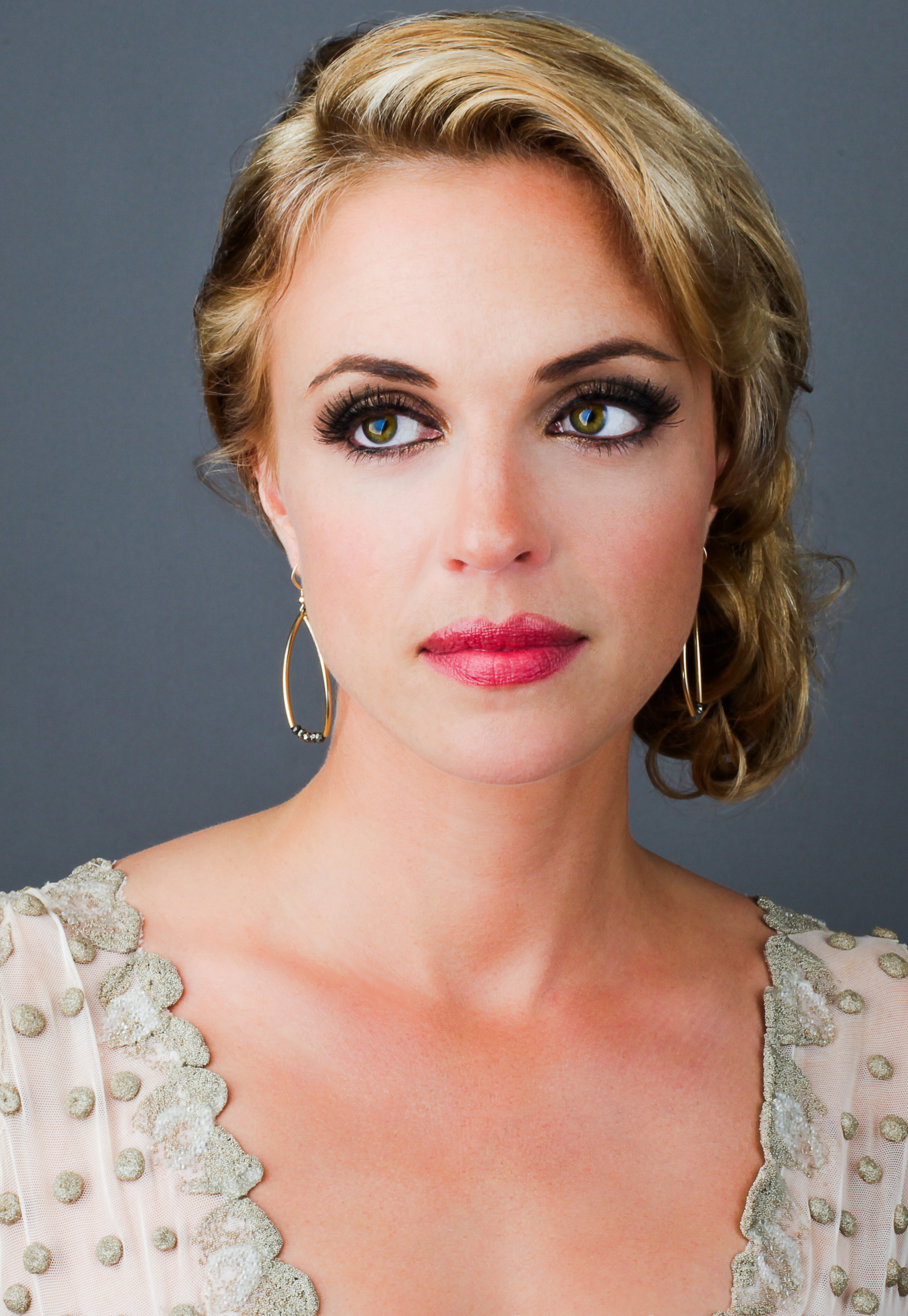
Kelly Sullivan

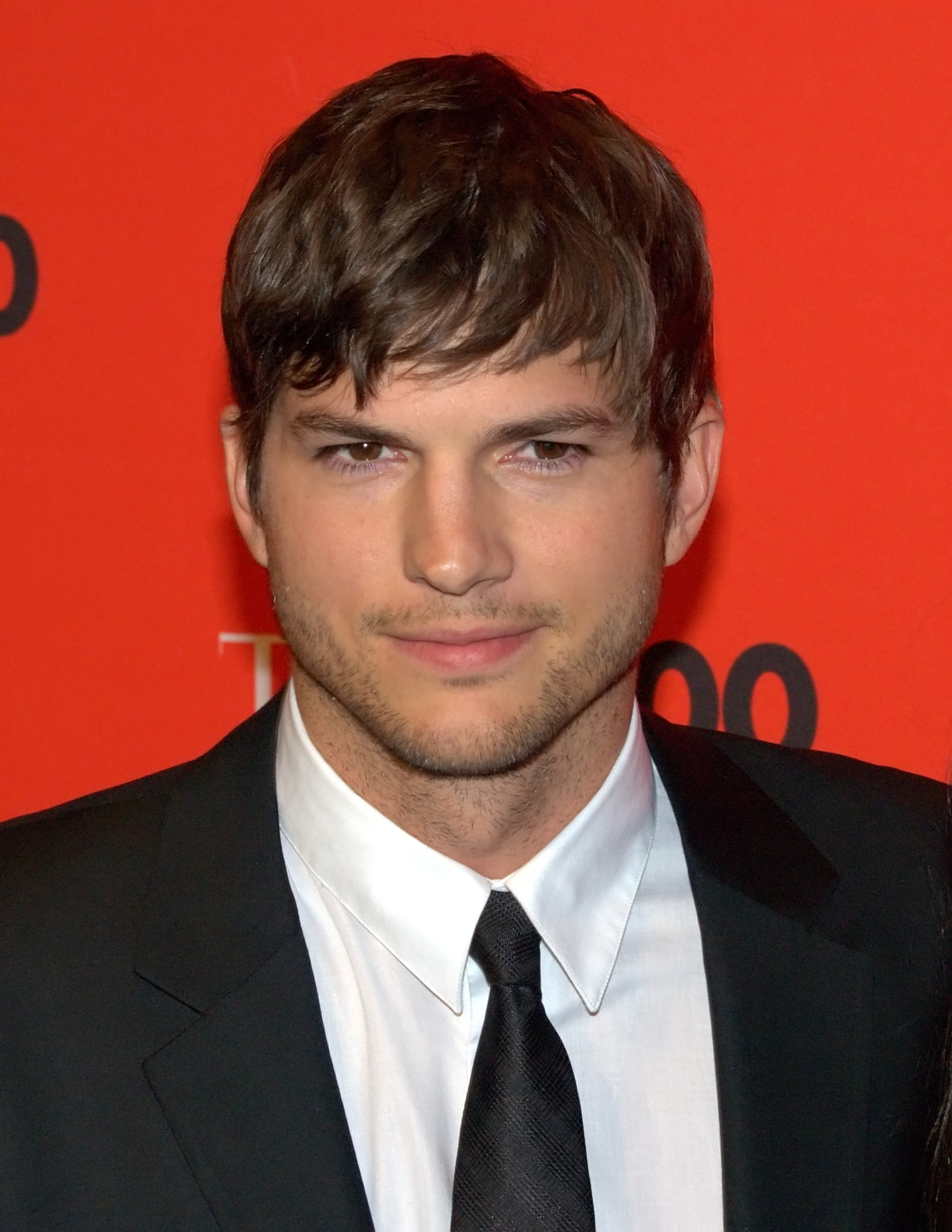
Ashton Kutcher

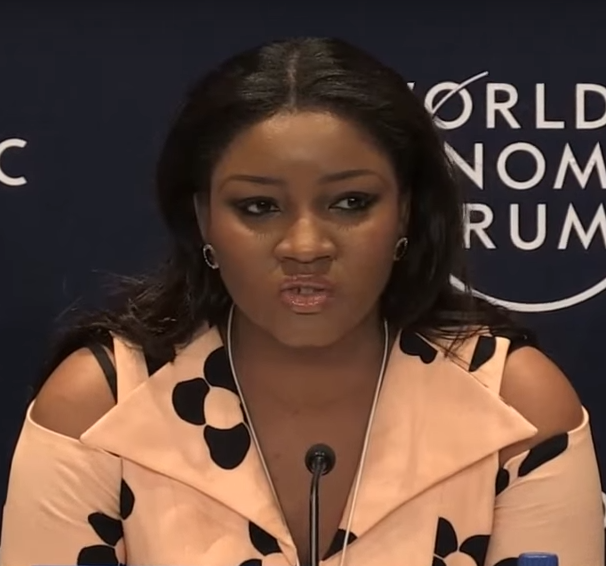
Omotola Jalade Ekeinde

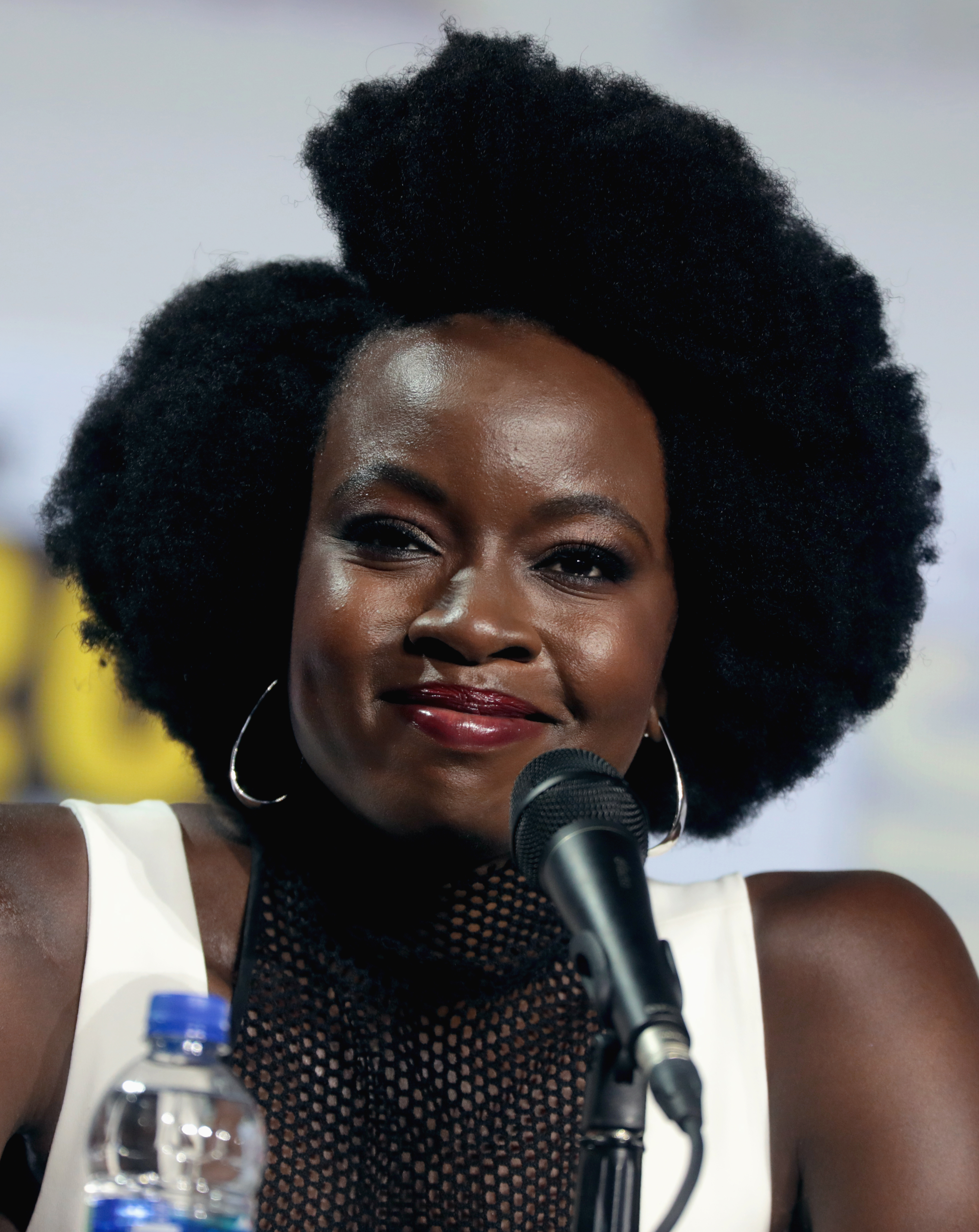
Danai Gurira

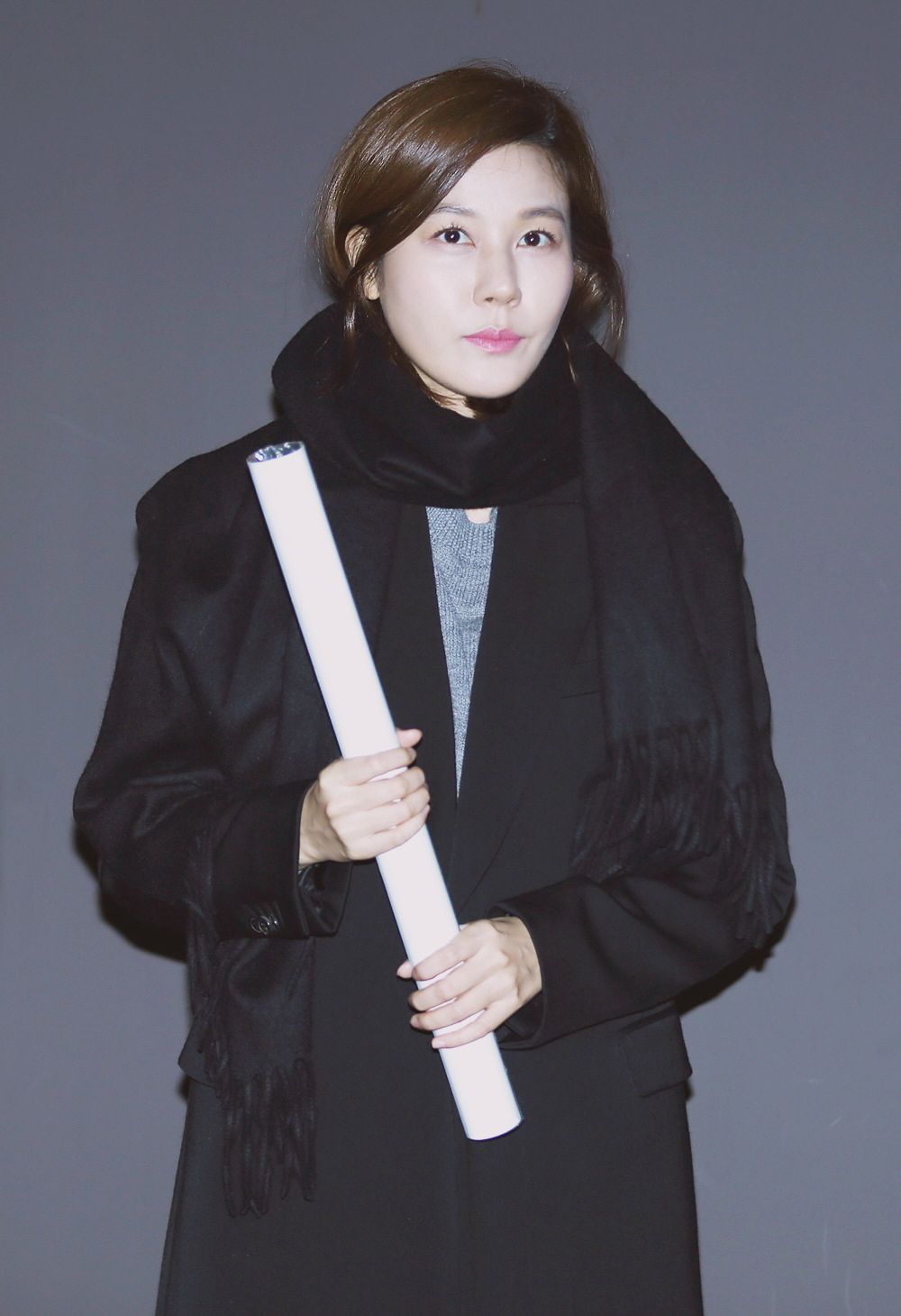
Kim Ha-neul

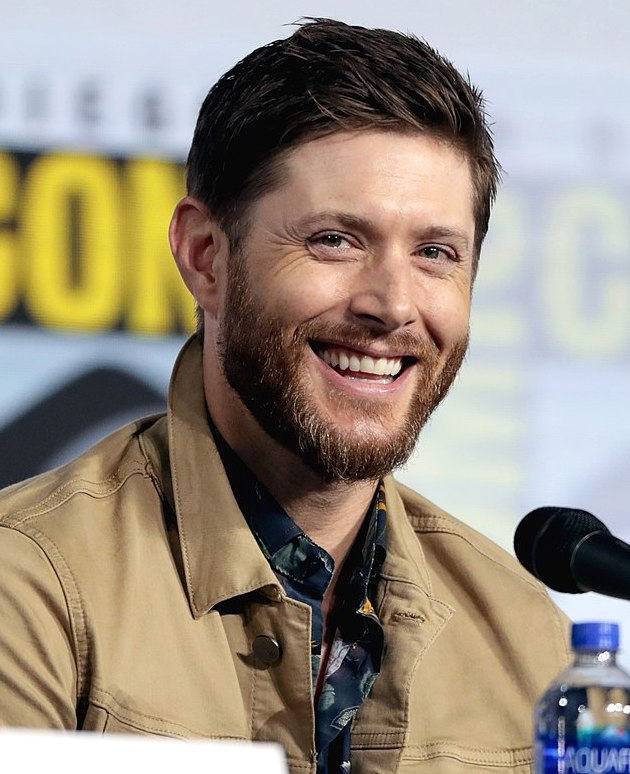
Jensen Ackles

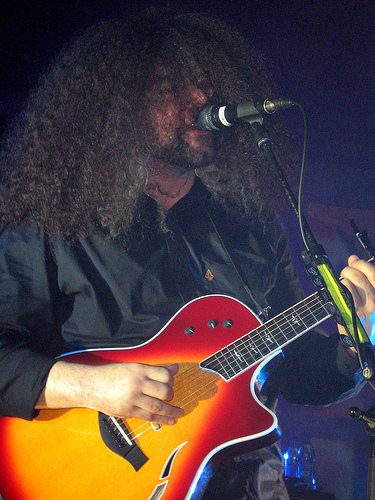
Claudio Sanchez

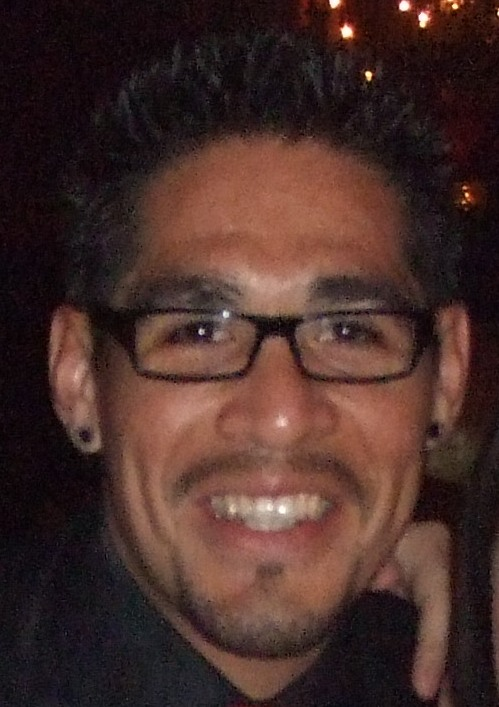
Antonio Margarito

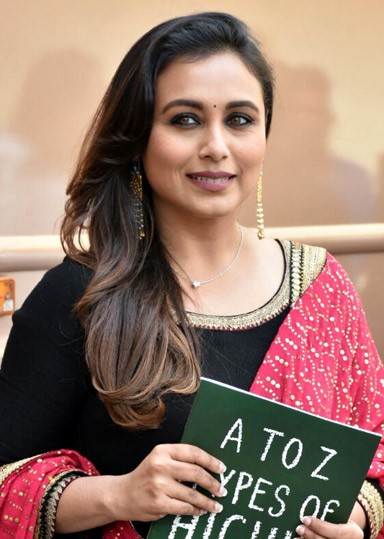
Rani Mukerji

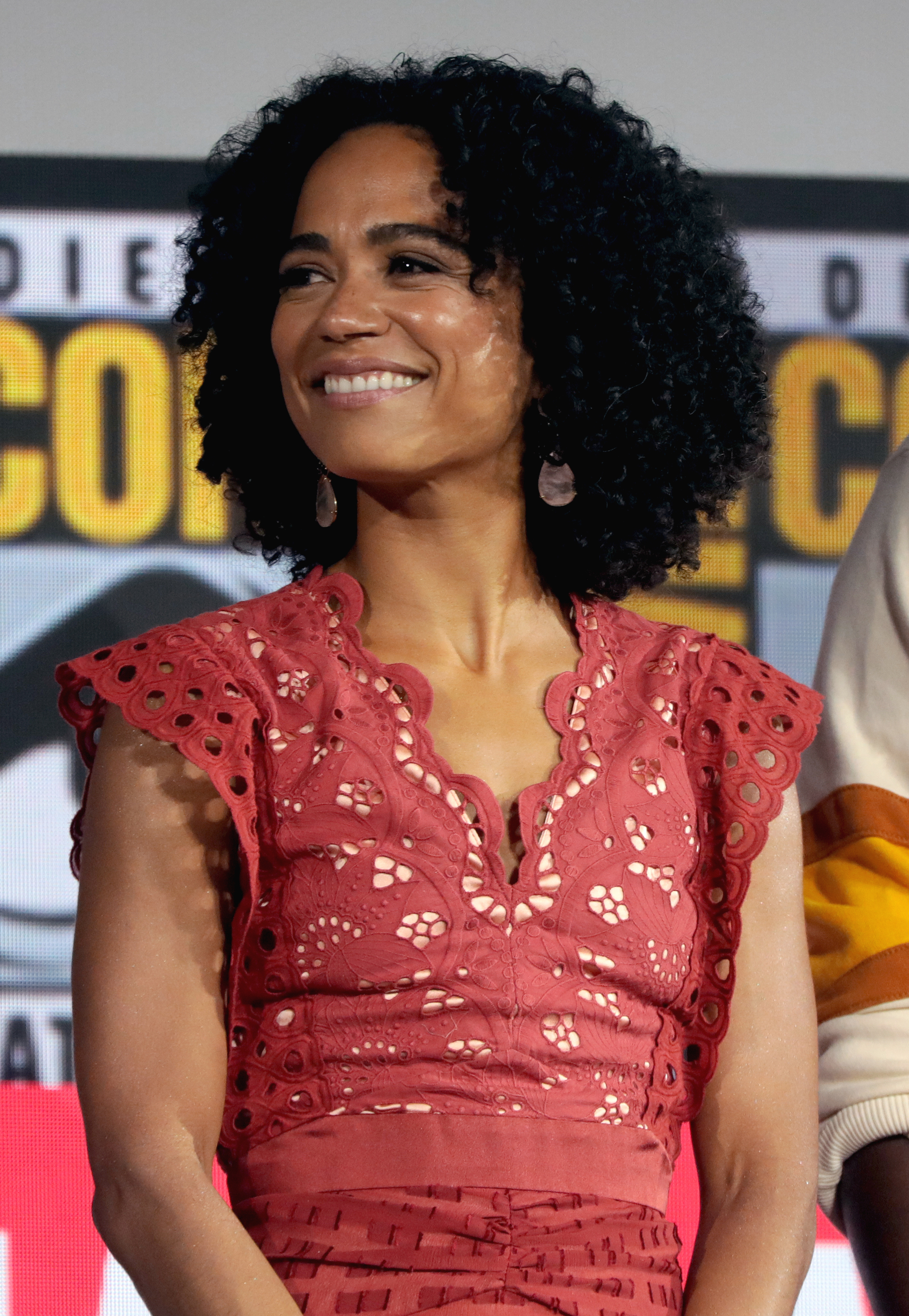
Lauren Ridloff

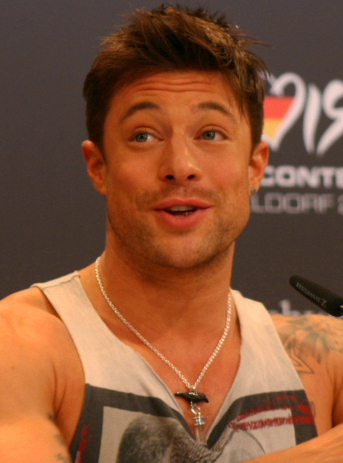
Duncan James

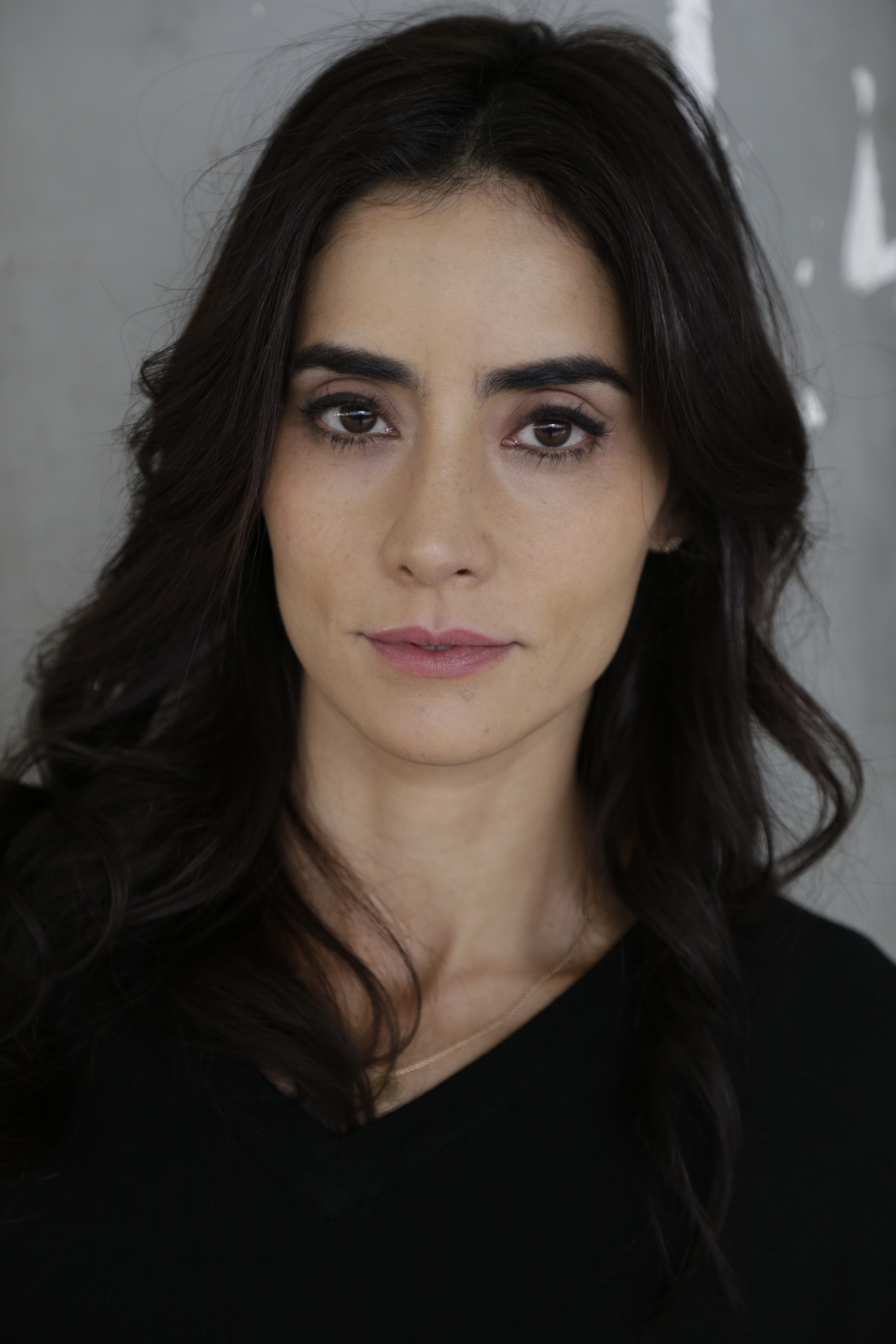
Paola Núñez

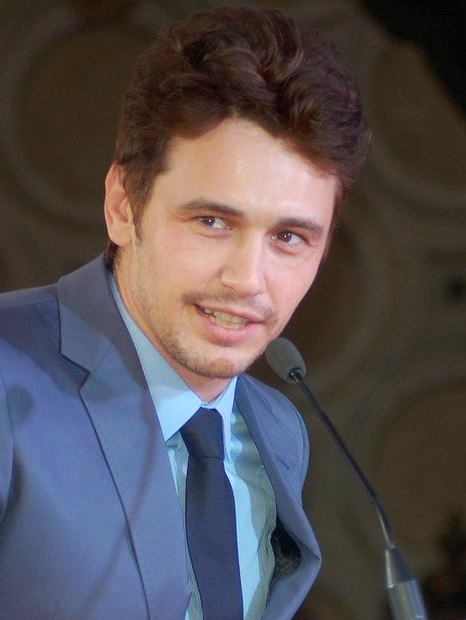
James Franco

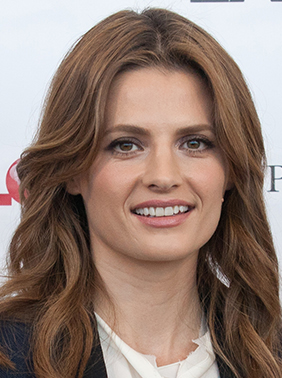
Stana Katic

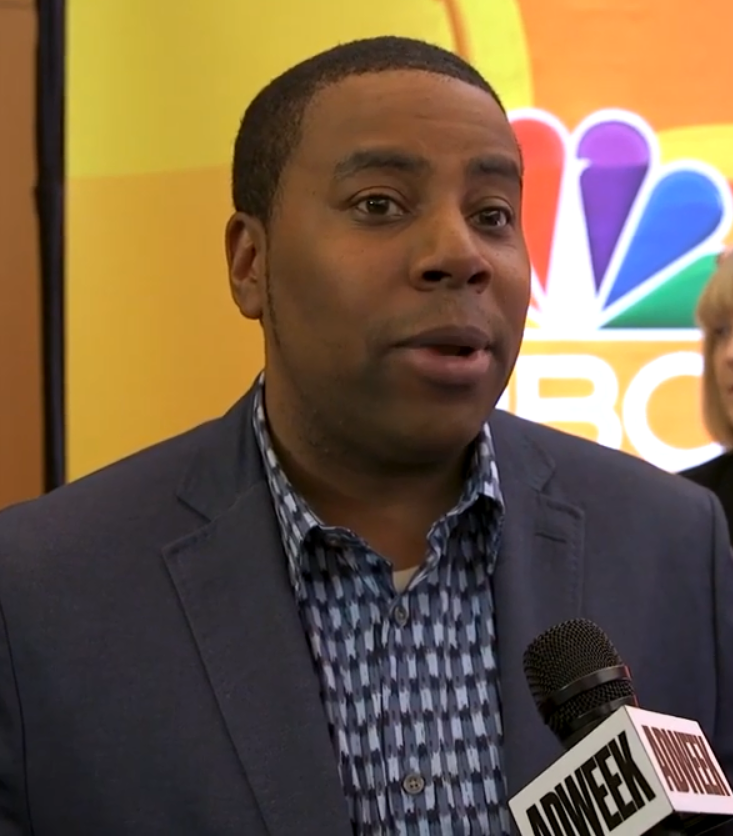
Kenan Thompson

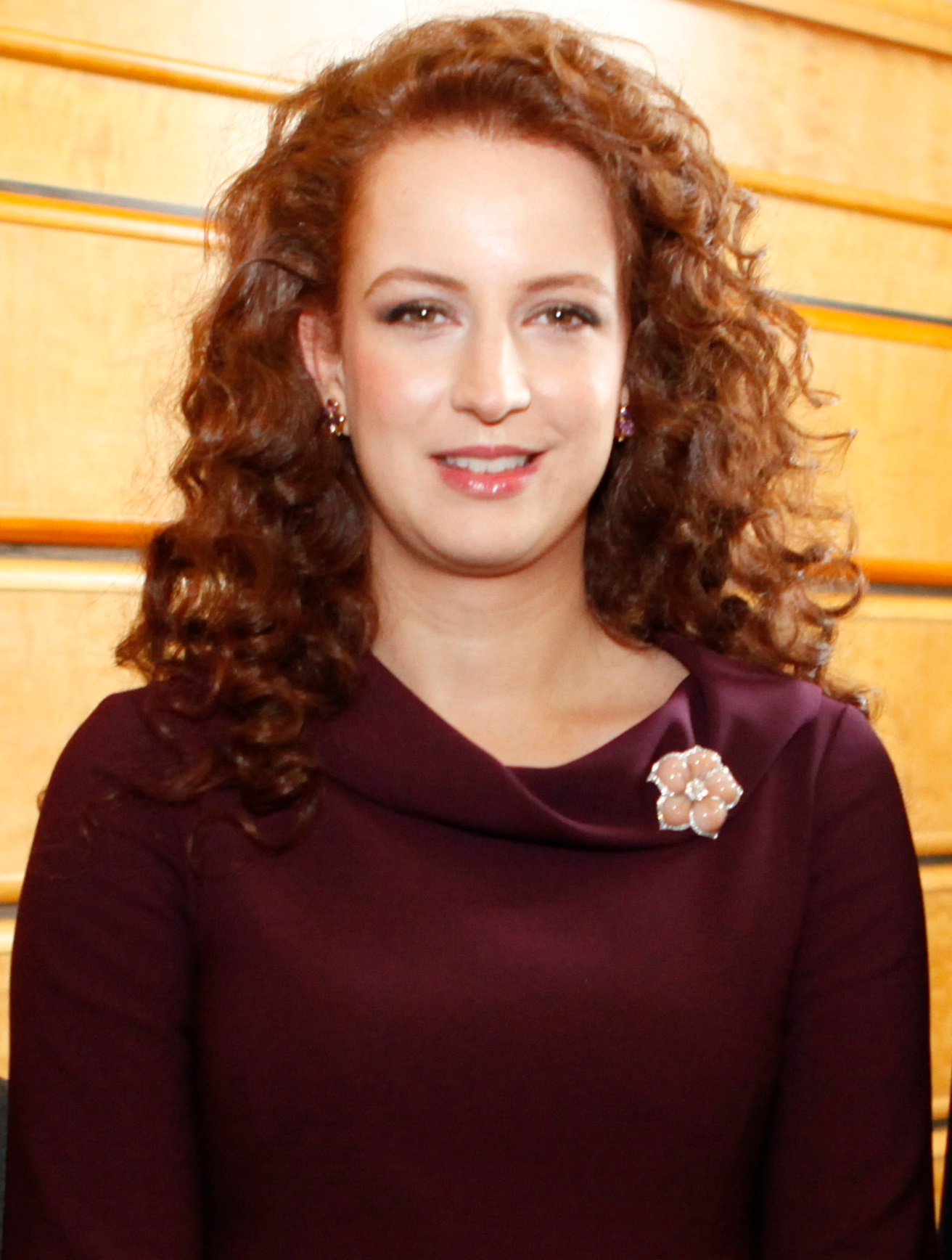
Princess Lalla Salma of Morocco

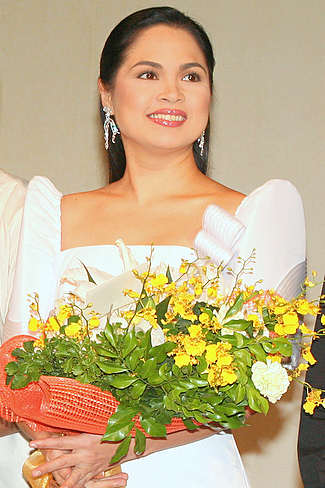
Judy Ann Santos

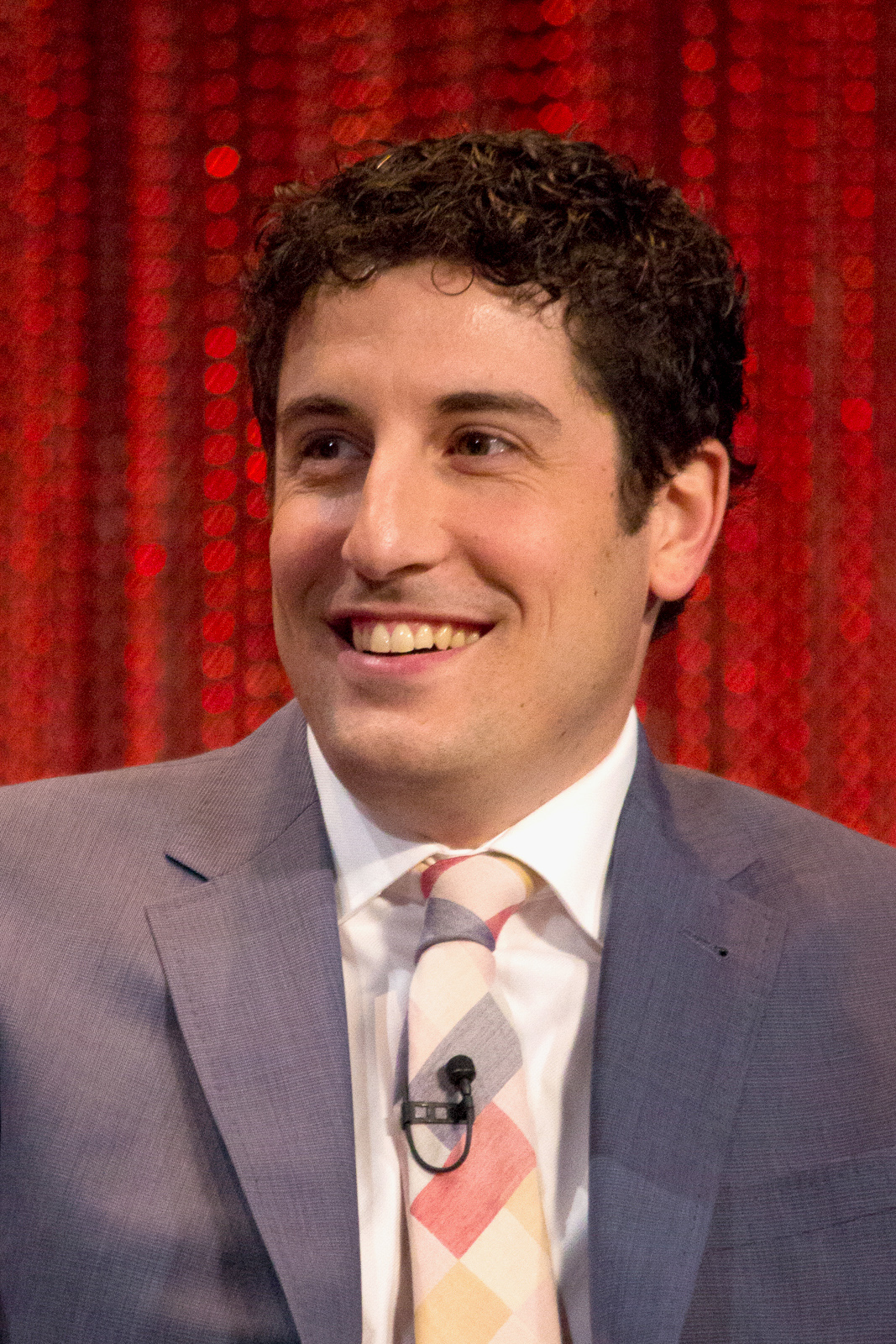
Jason Biggs

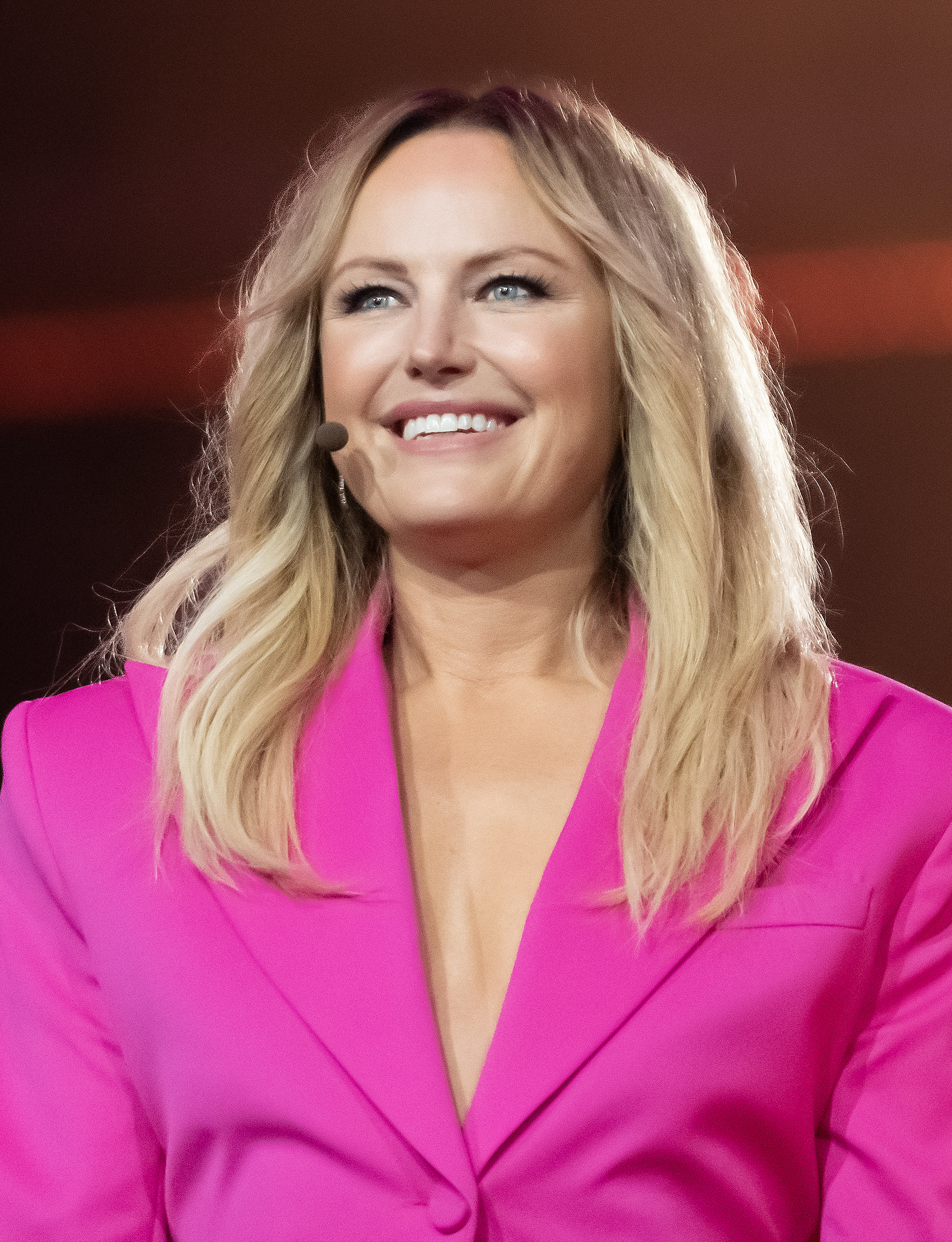
Malin Akerman

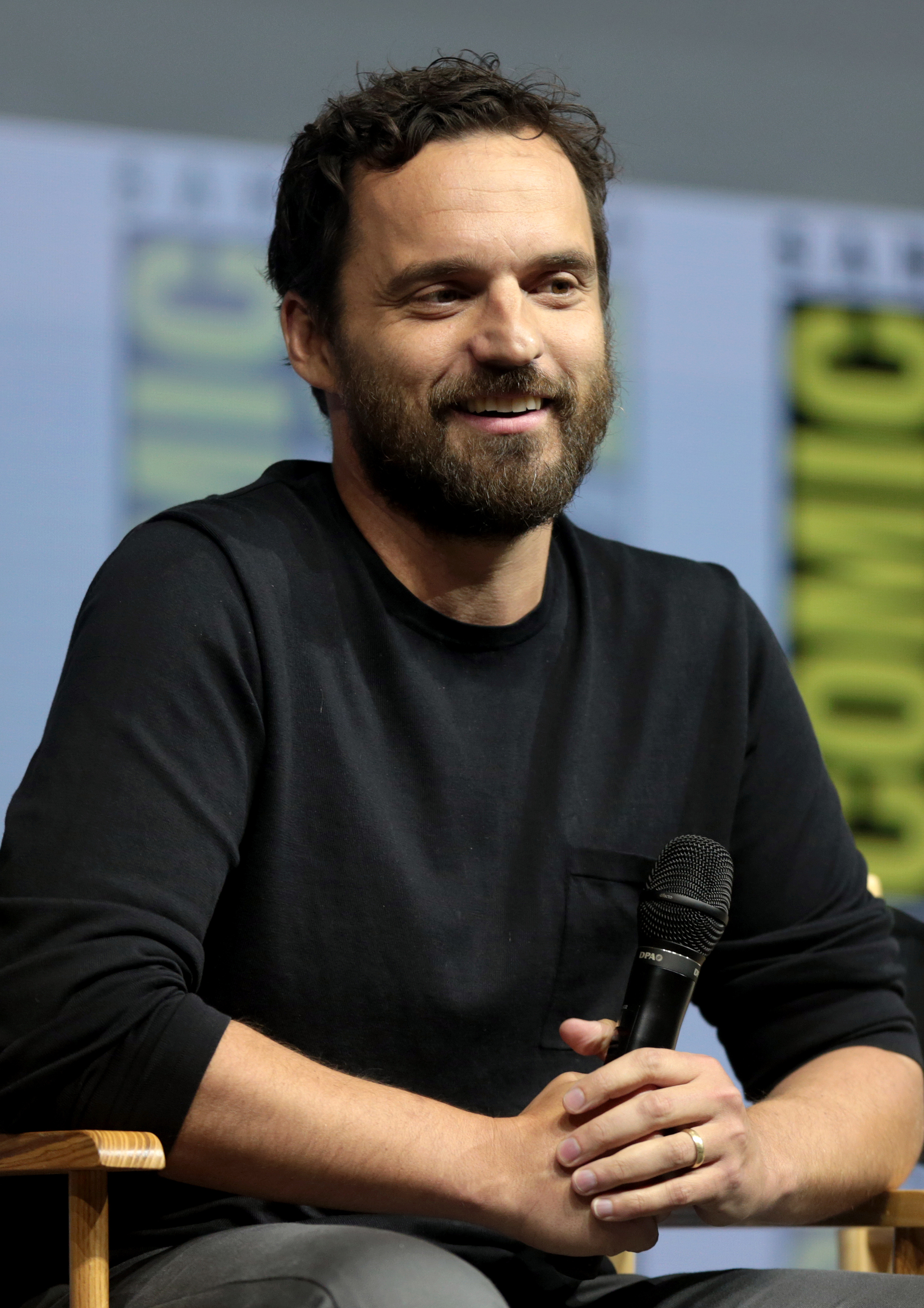
Jake Johnson

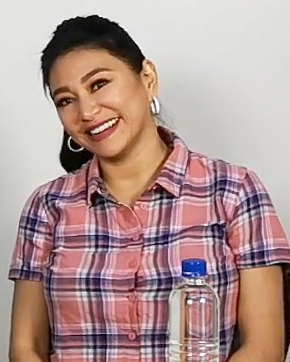
Rufa Mae Quinto

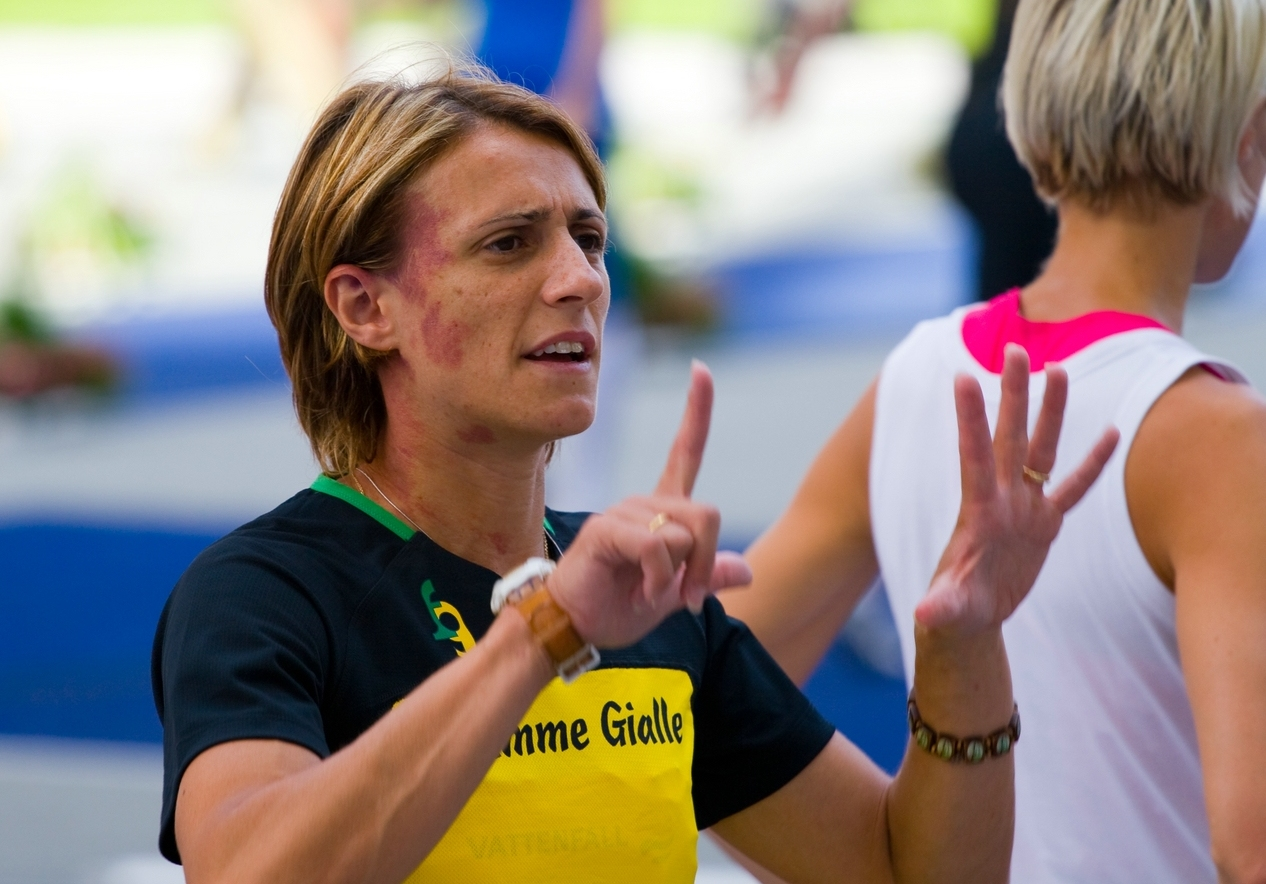
Antonietta Di Martino

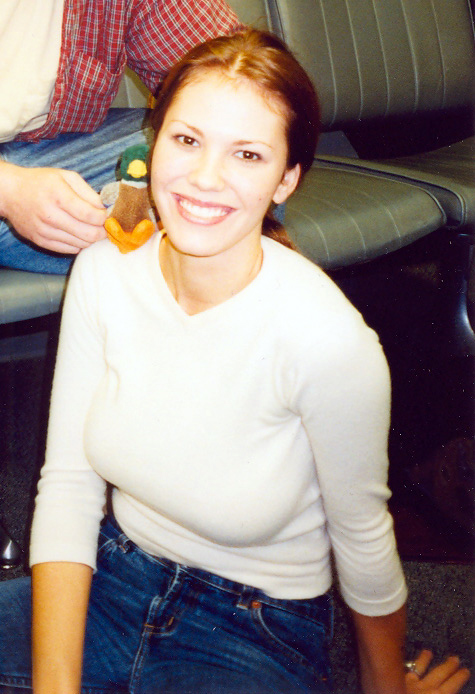
Nikki Cox

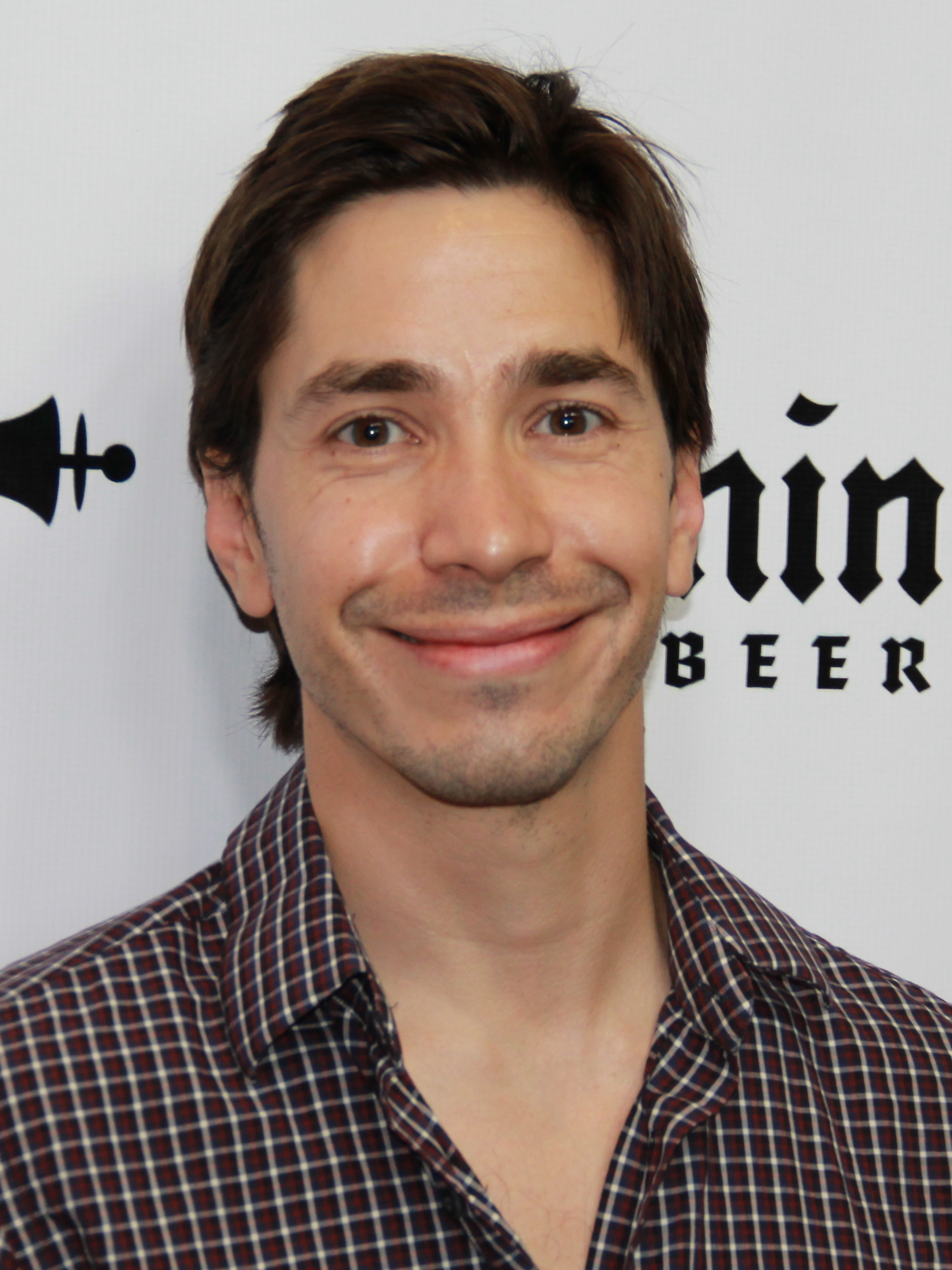
Justin Long

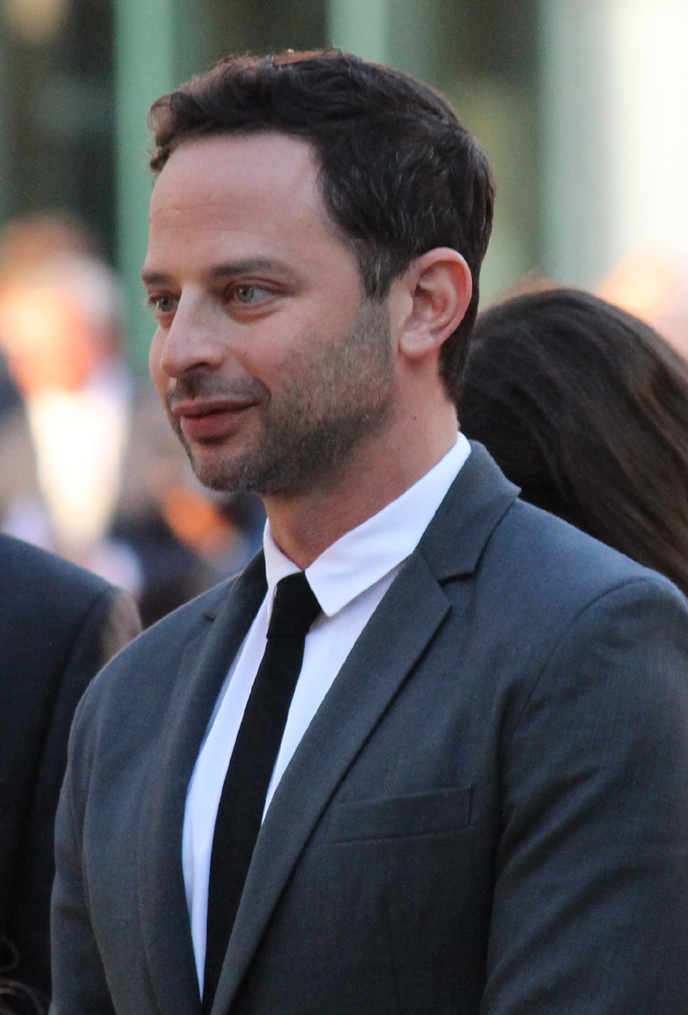
Nick Kroll

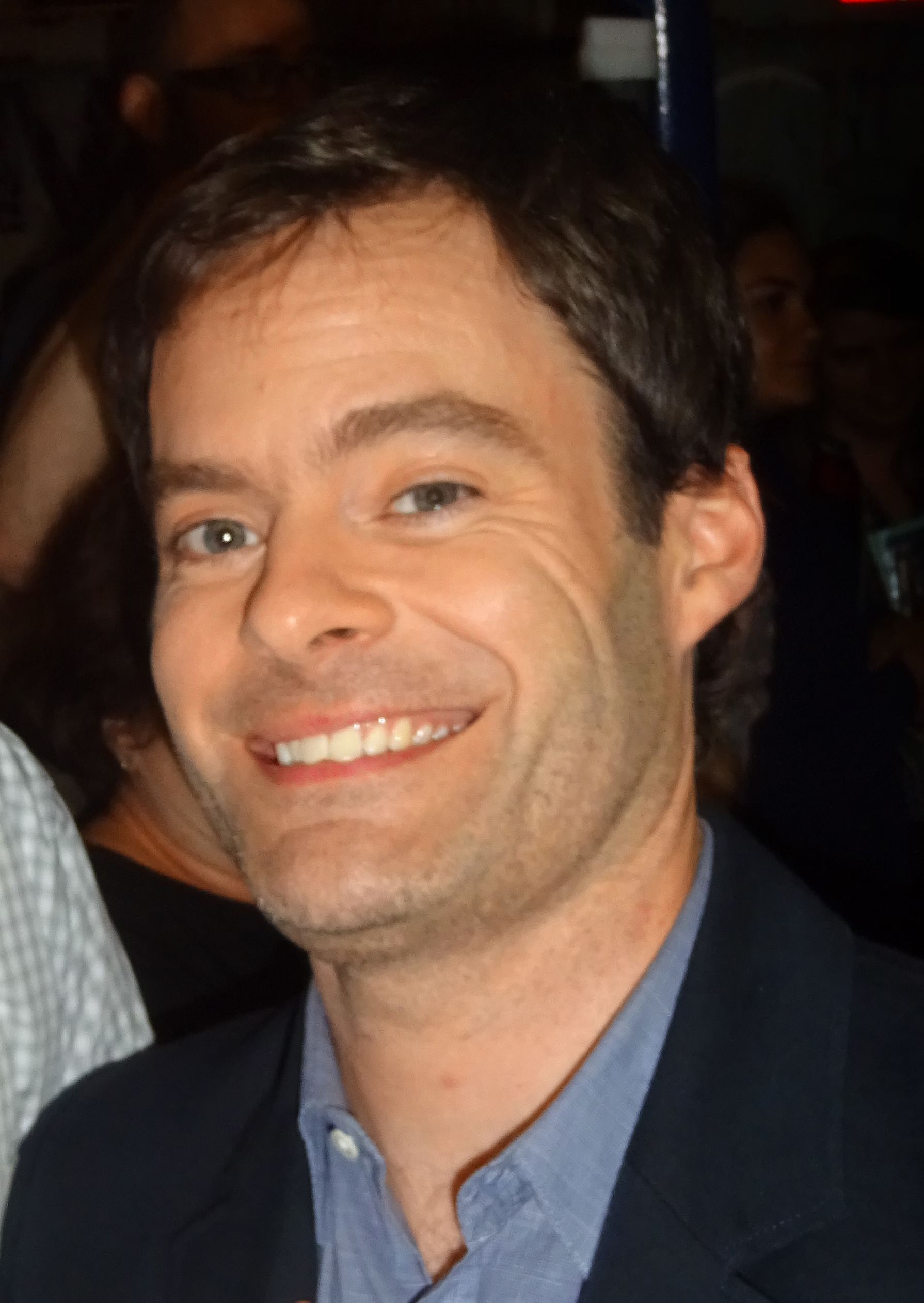
Bill Hader

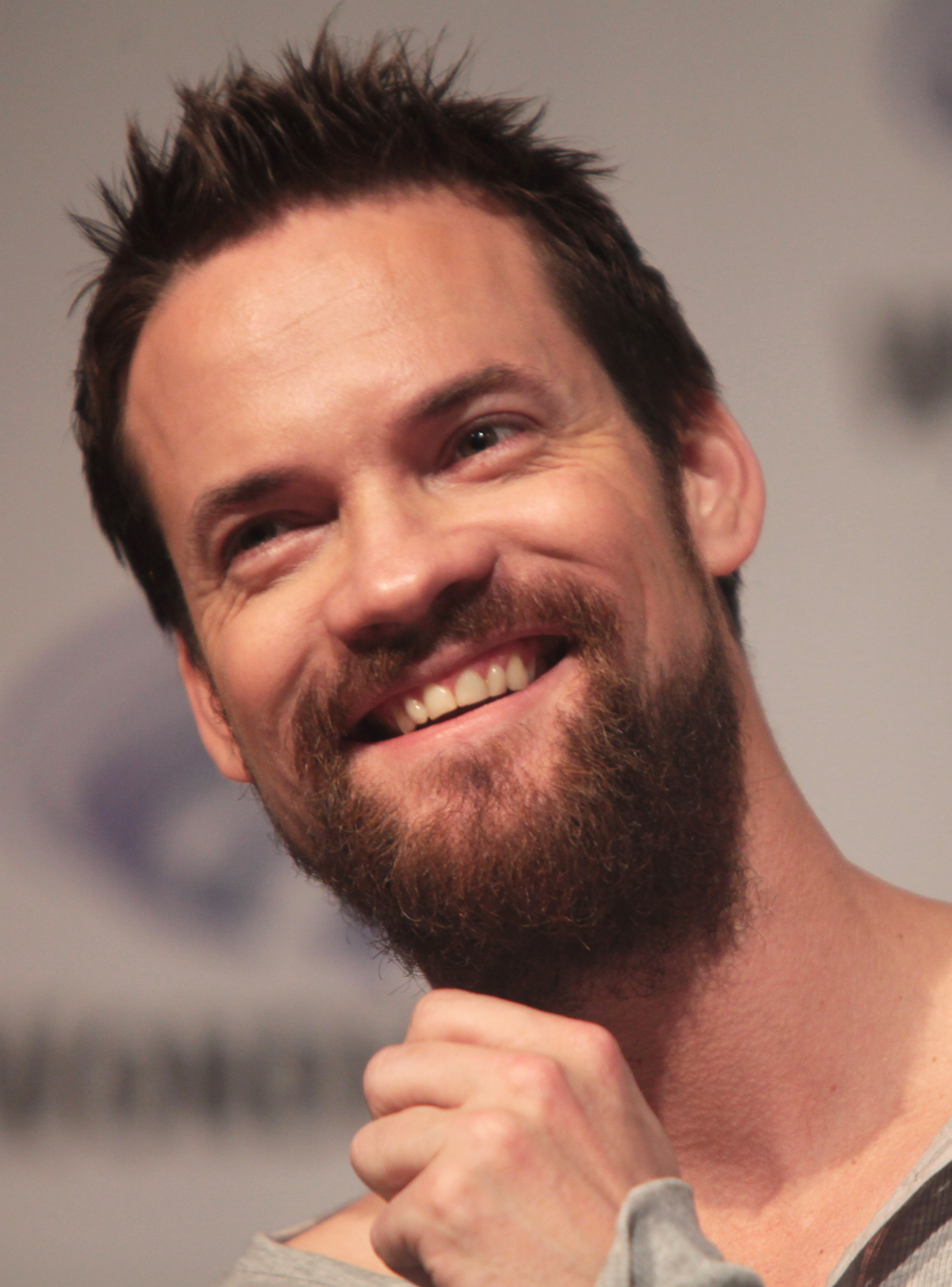
Shane West

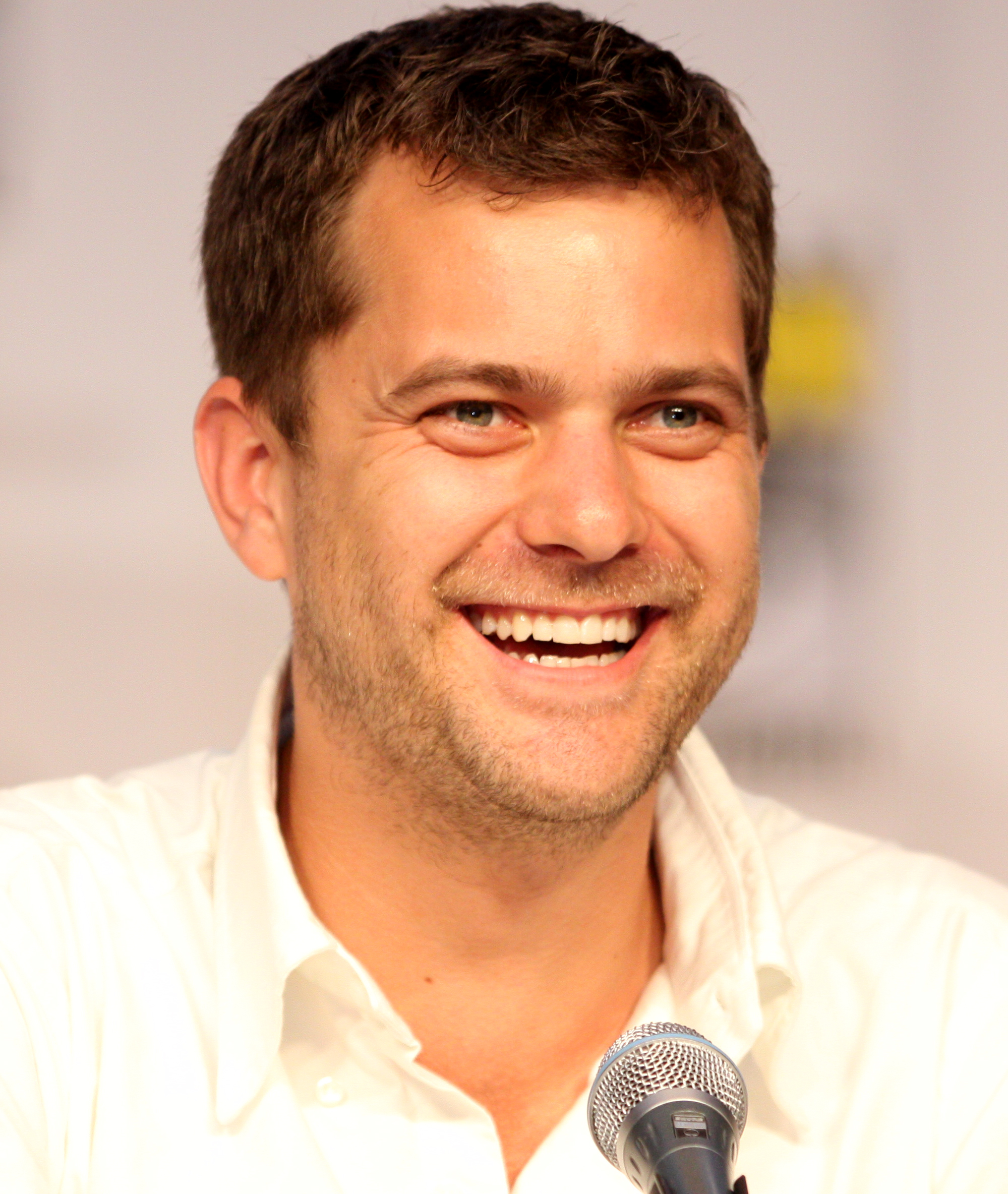
Joshua Jackson

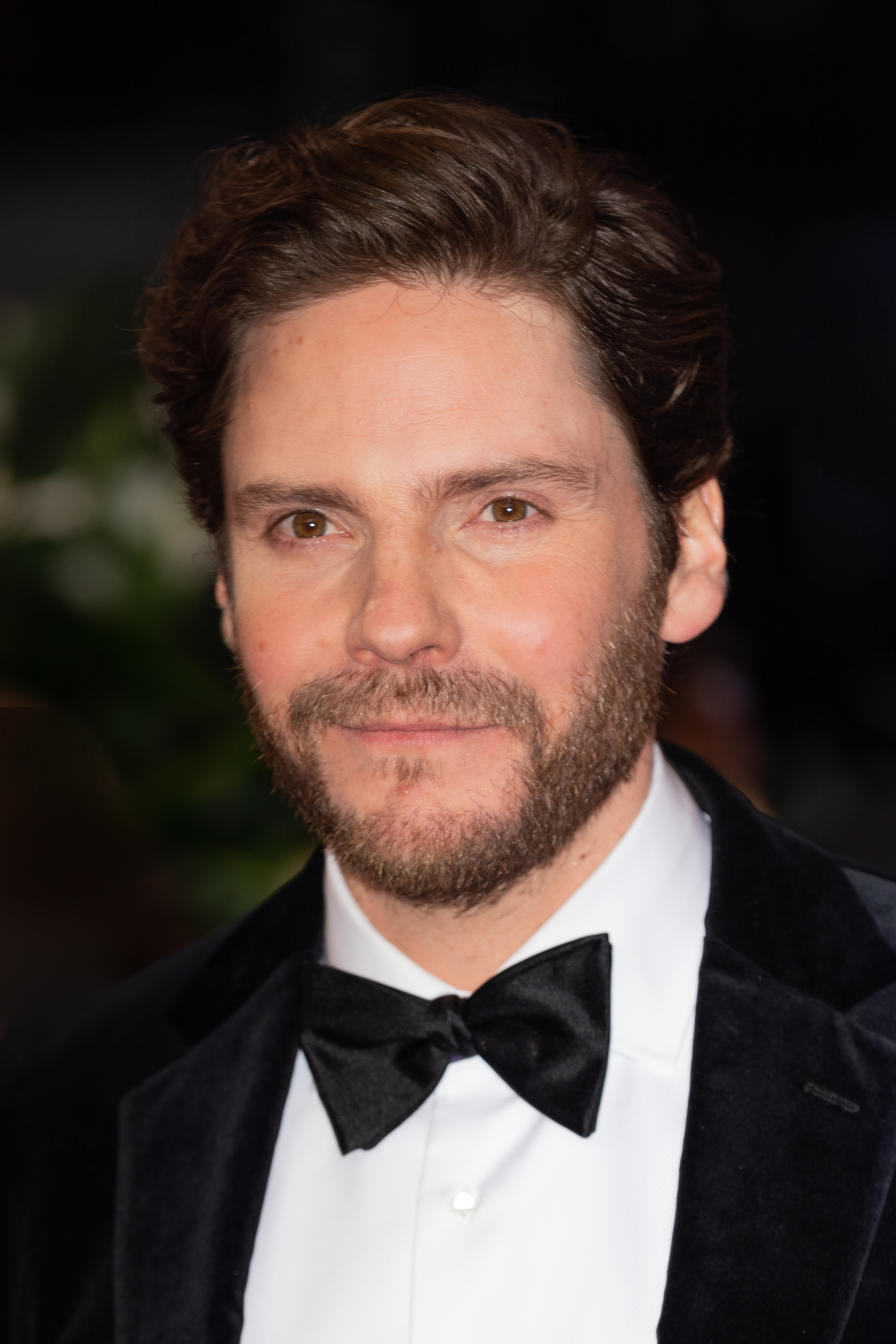
Daniel Brühl

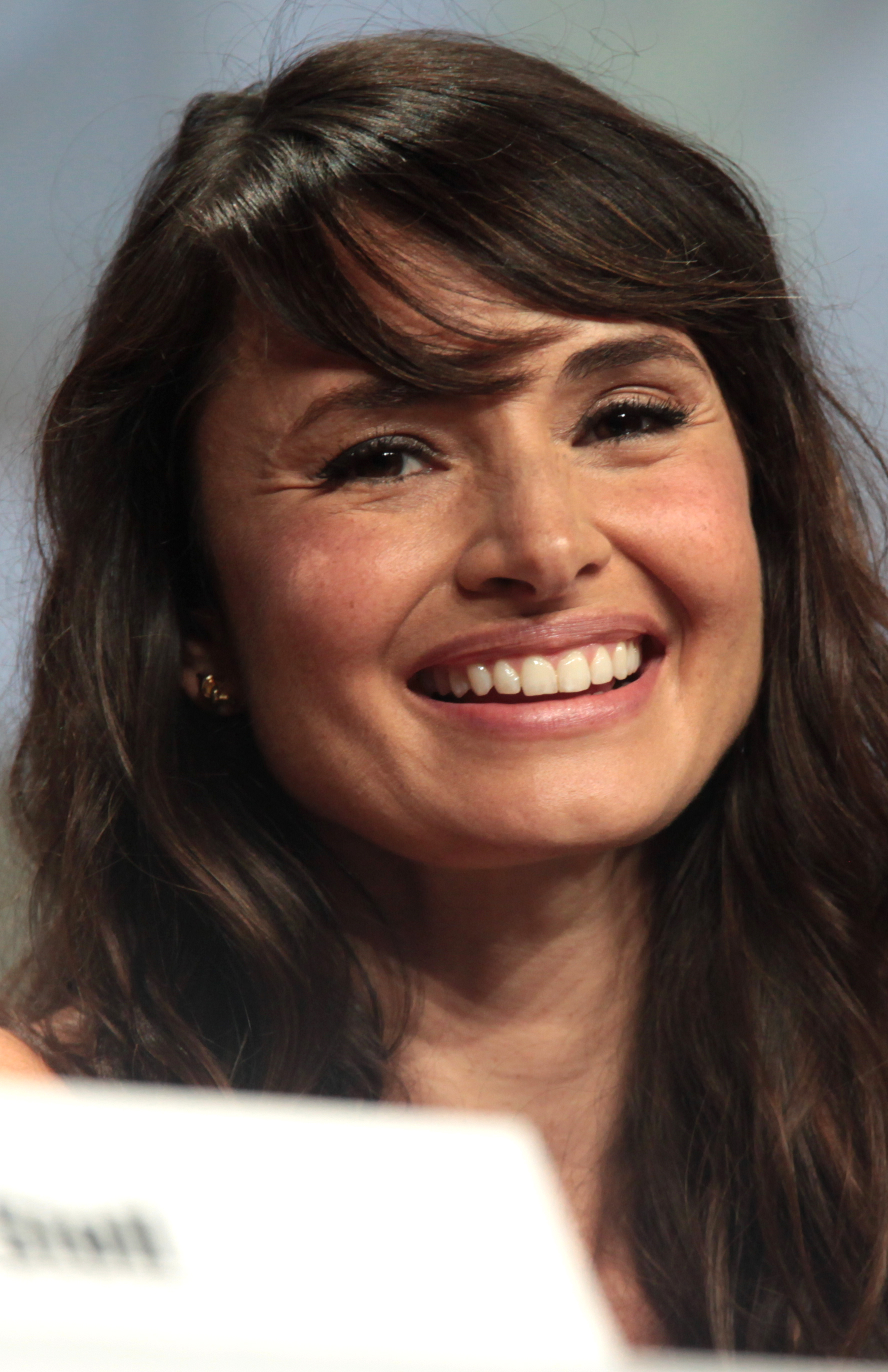
Mía Maestro

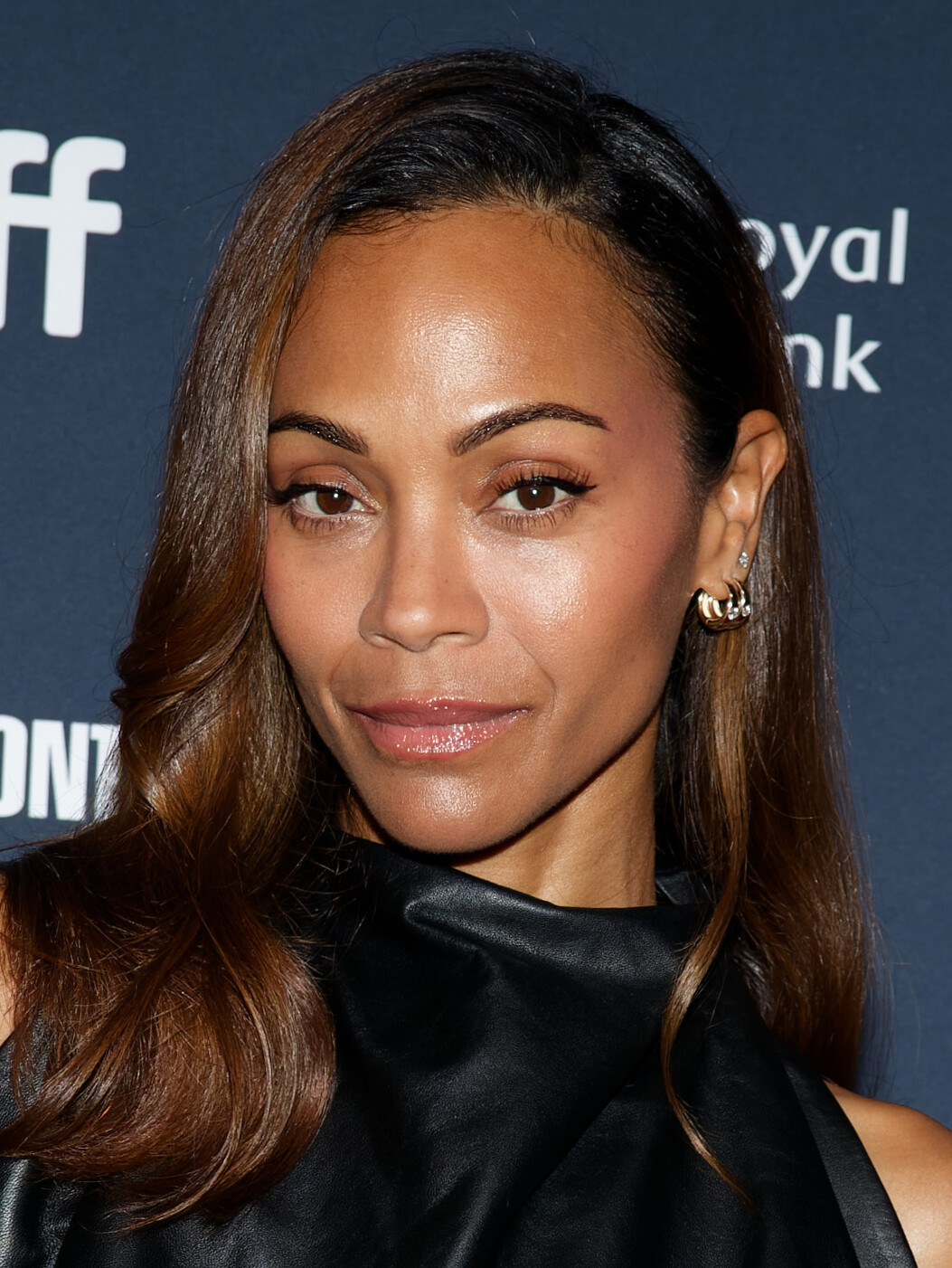
Zoe Saldaña

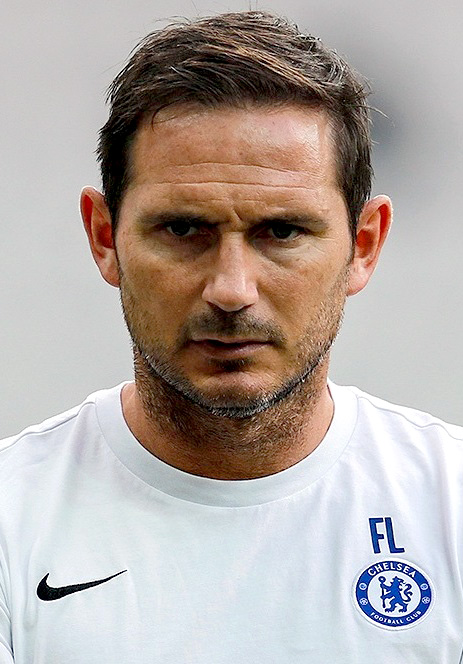
Frank Lampard

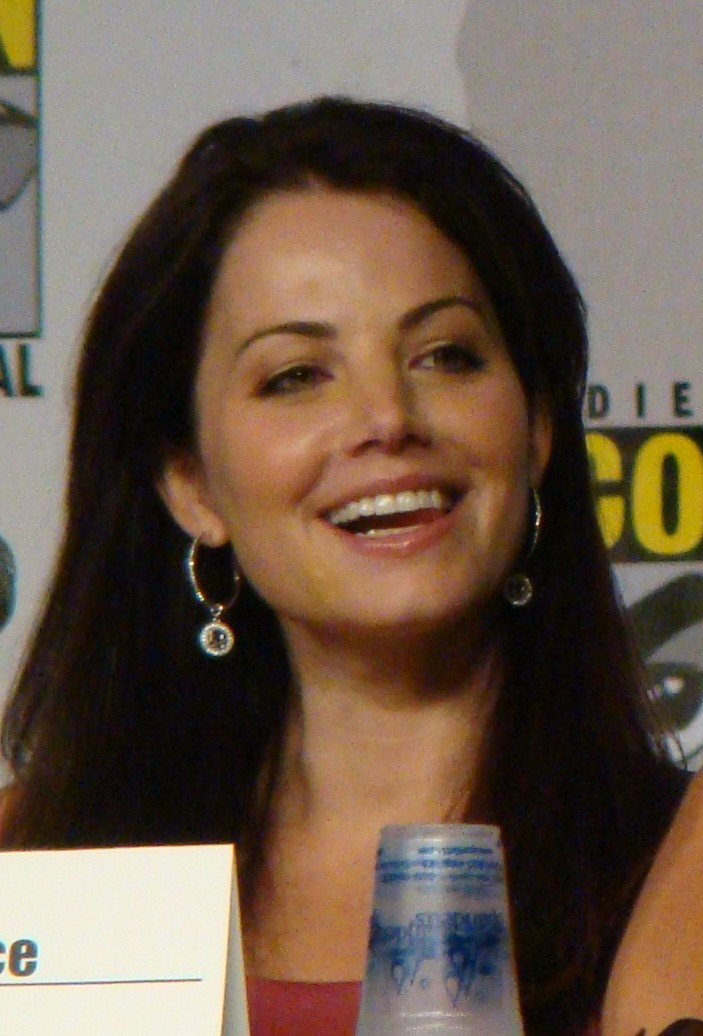
Erica Durance

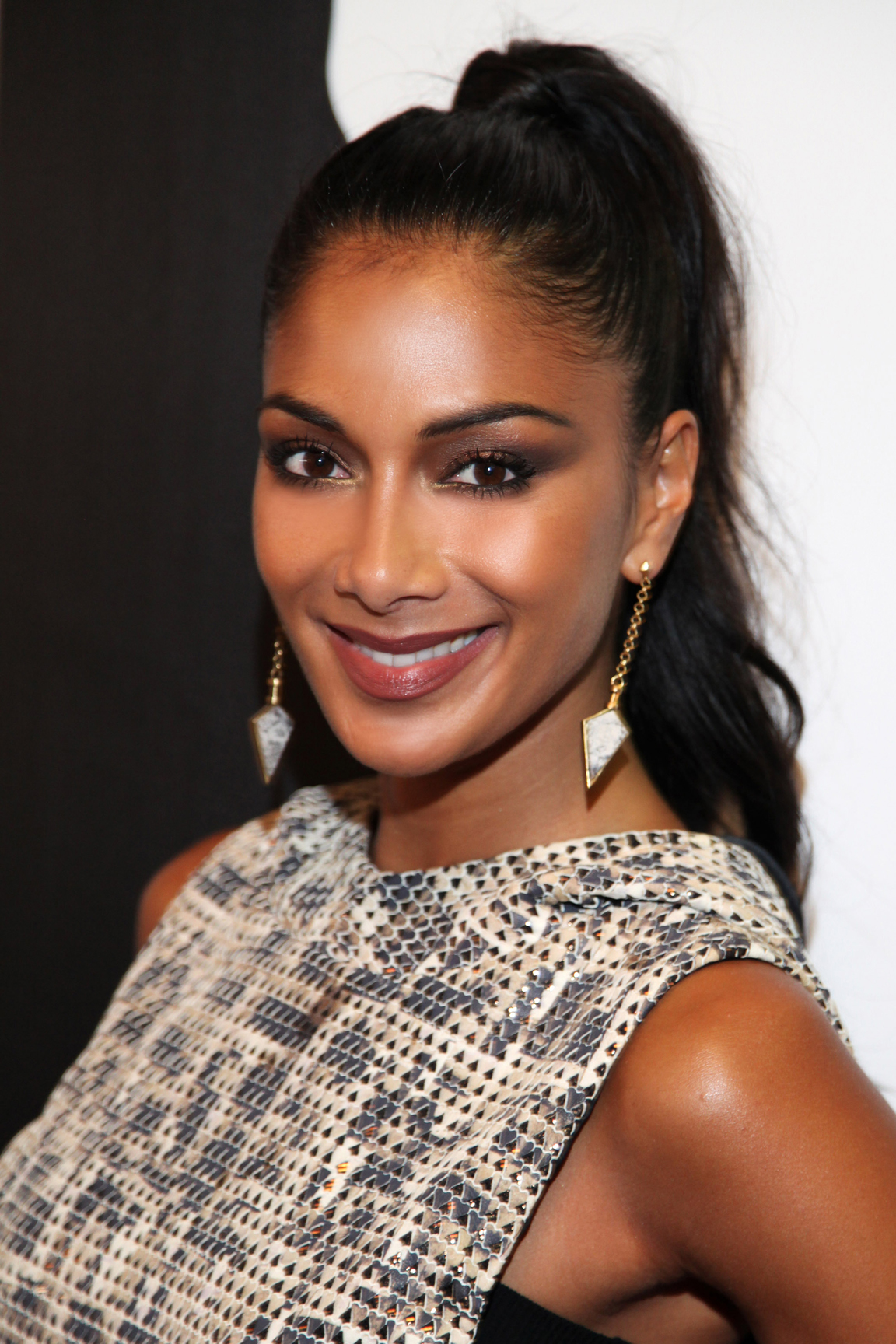
Nicole Scherzinger

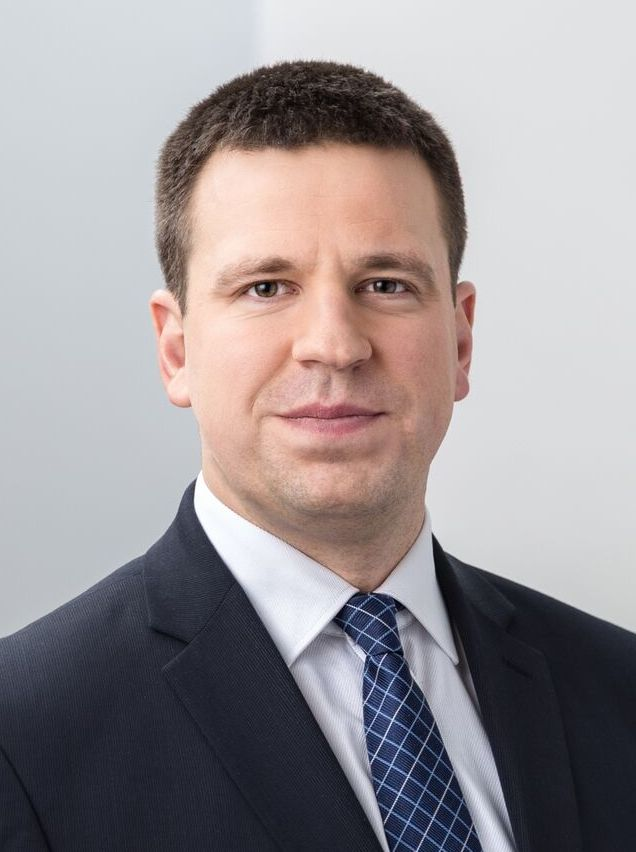
Jüri Ratas

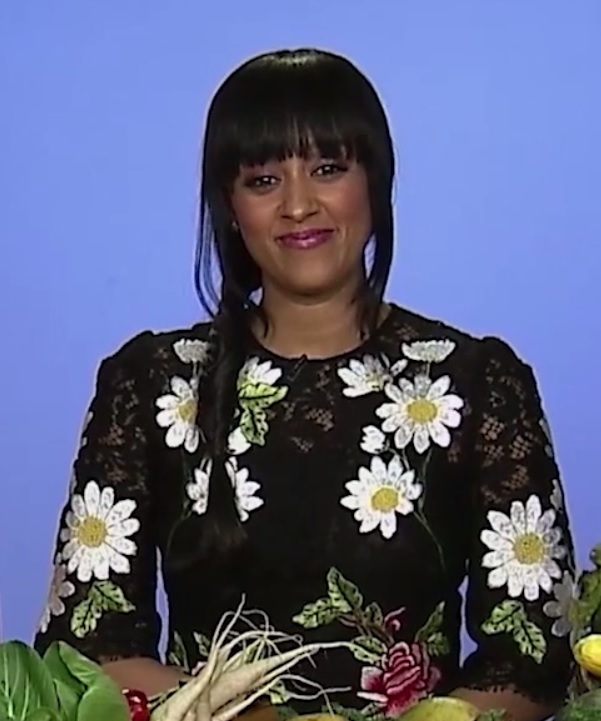
Tia Mowry

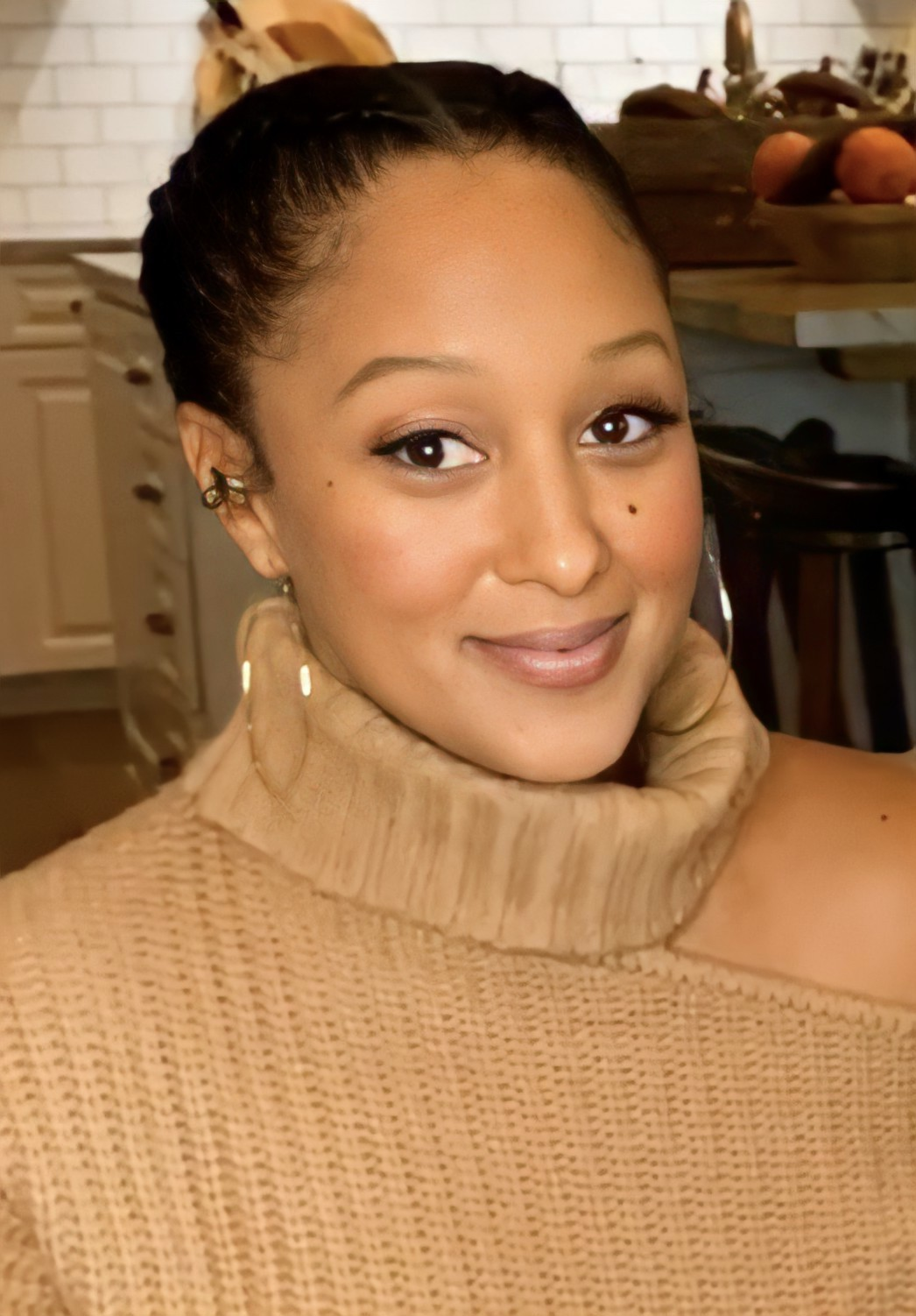
Tamera Mowry

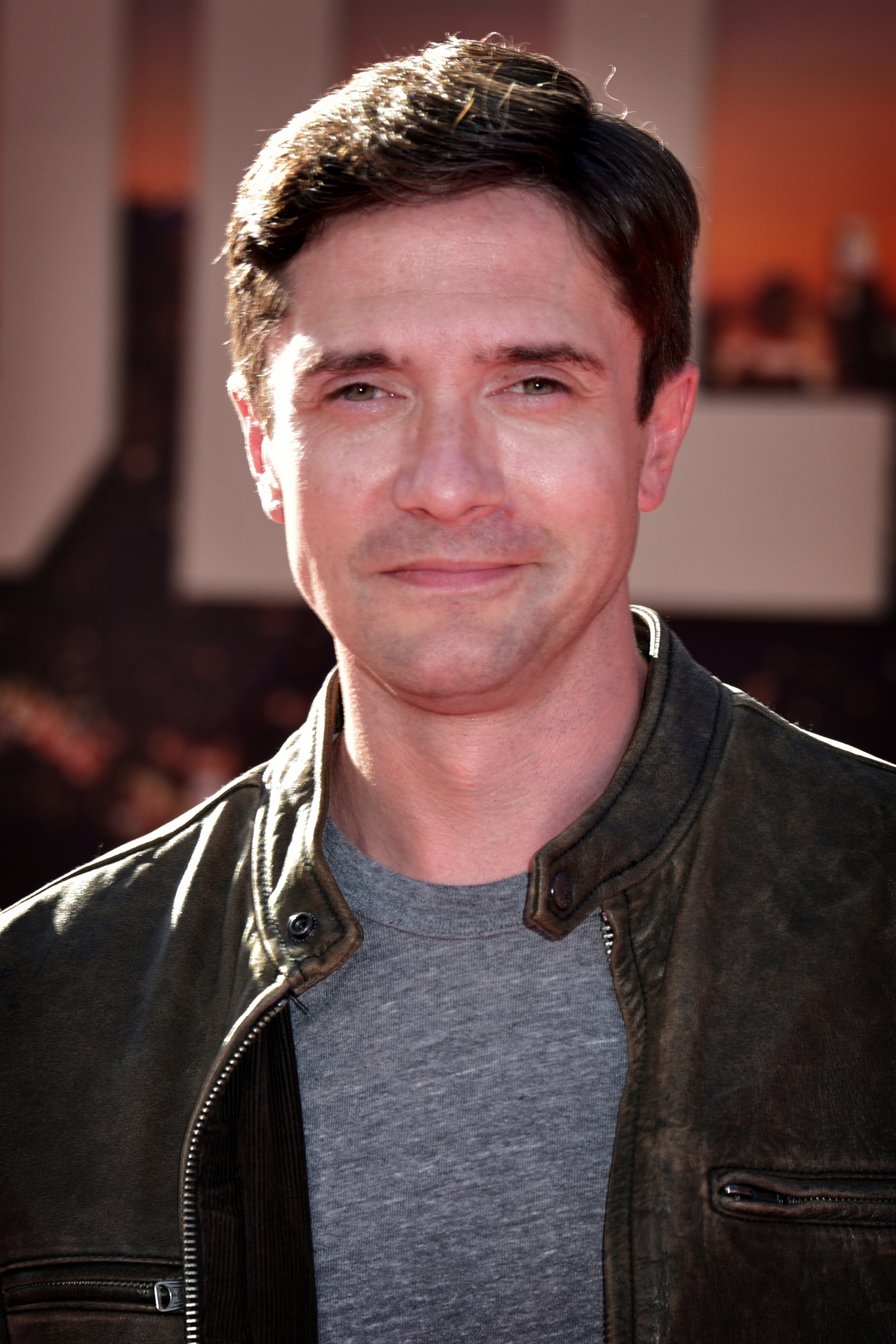
Topher Grace

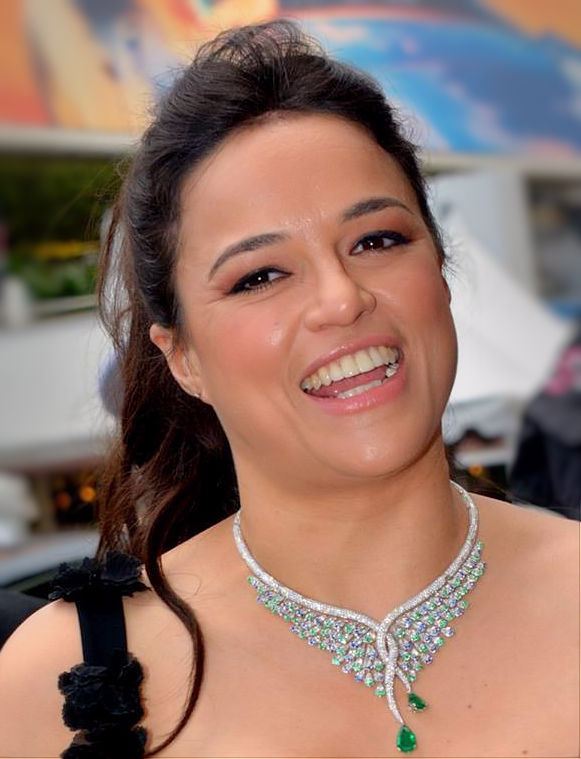
Michelle Rodriguez

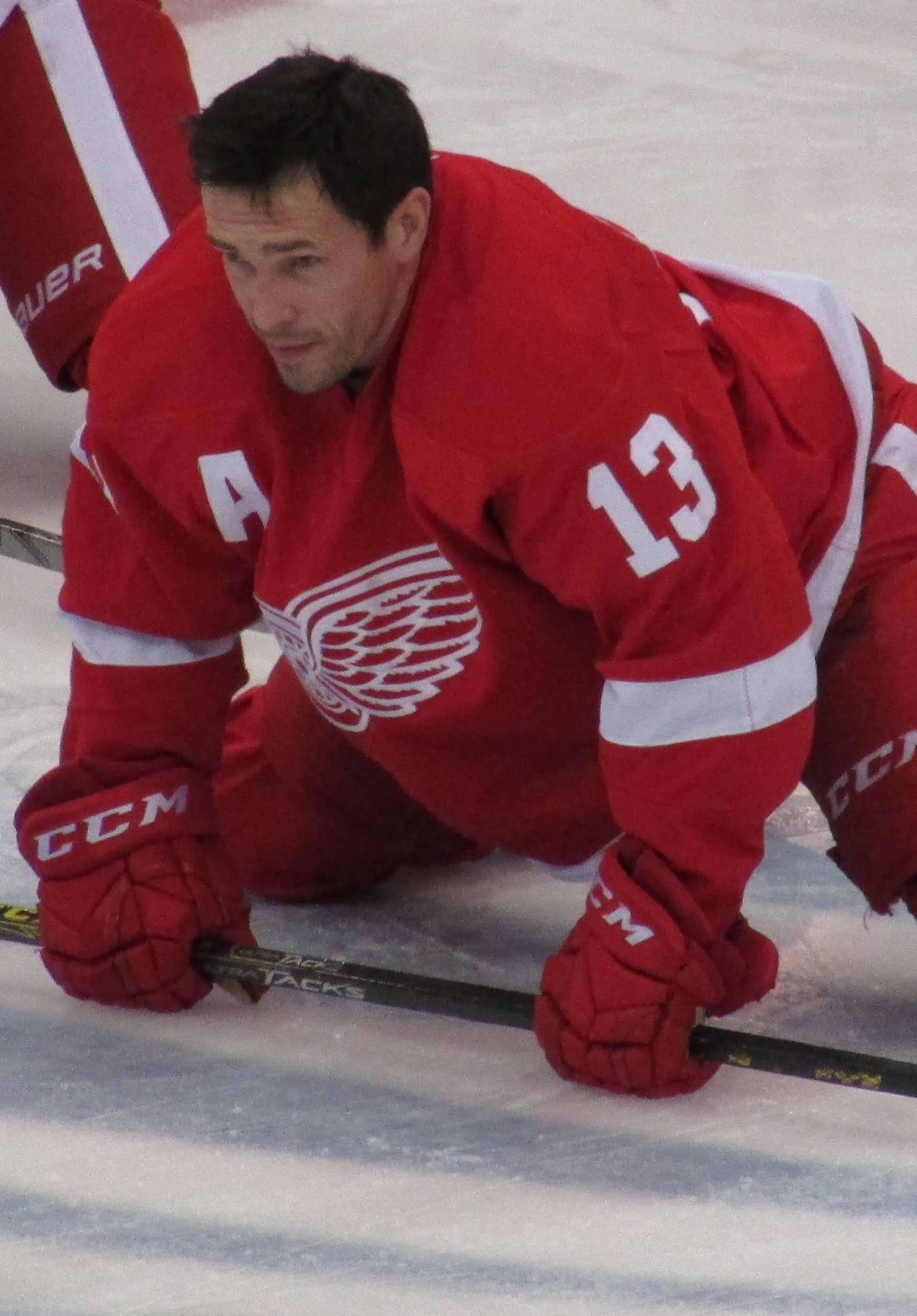
Pavel Datsyuk

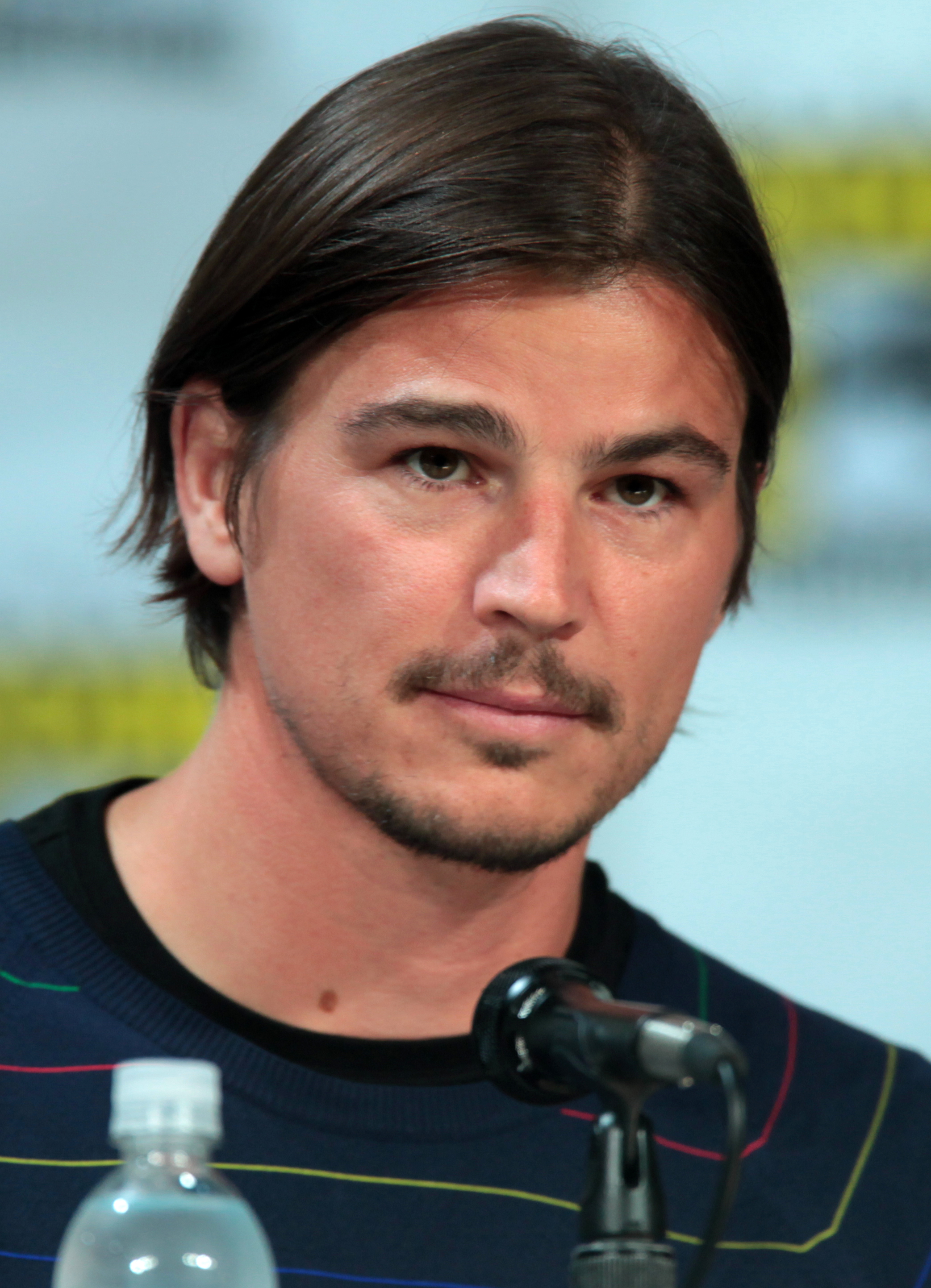
Josh Hartnett

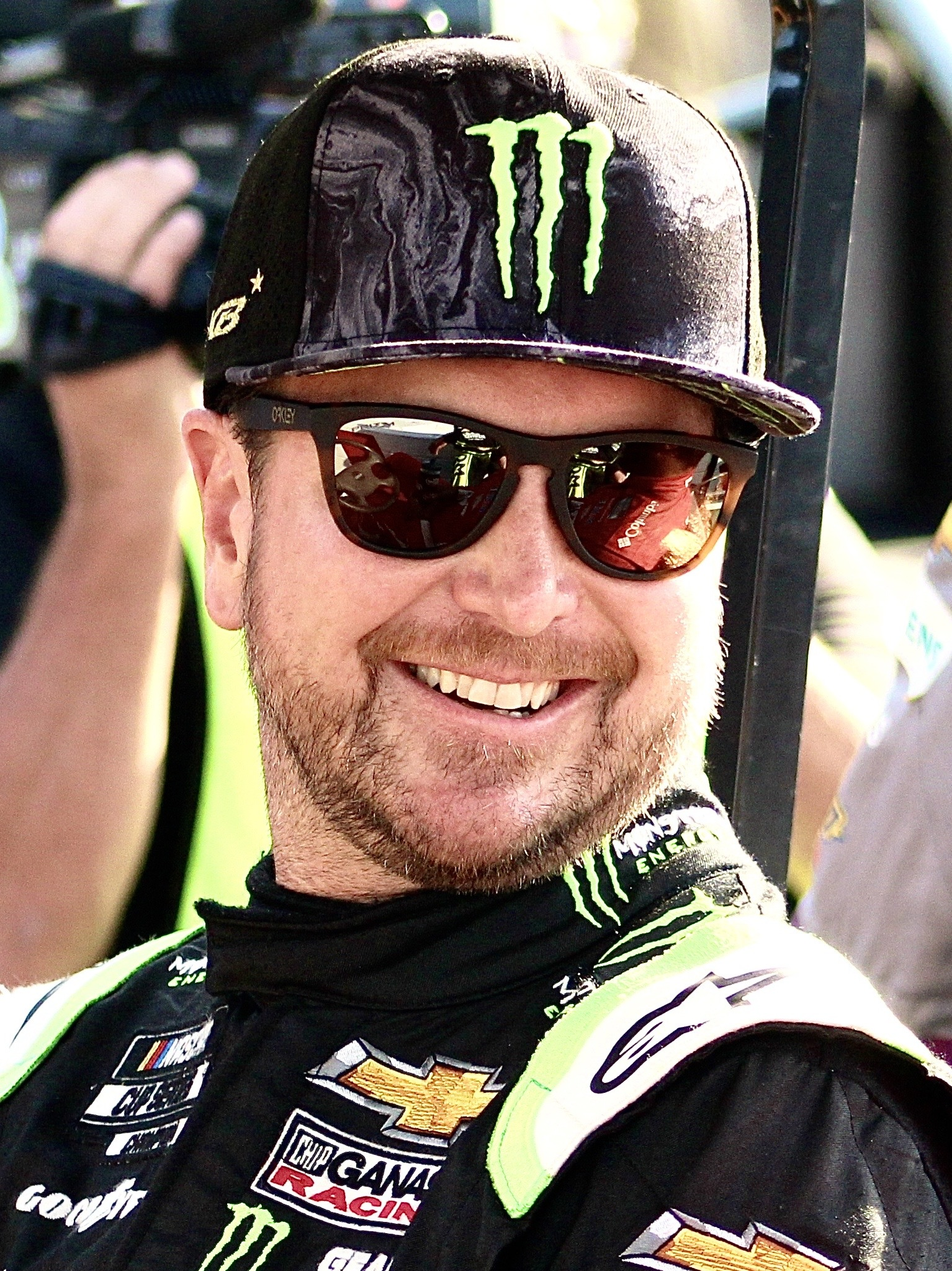
Kurt Busch

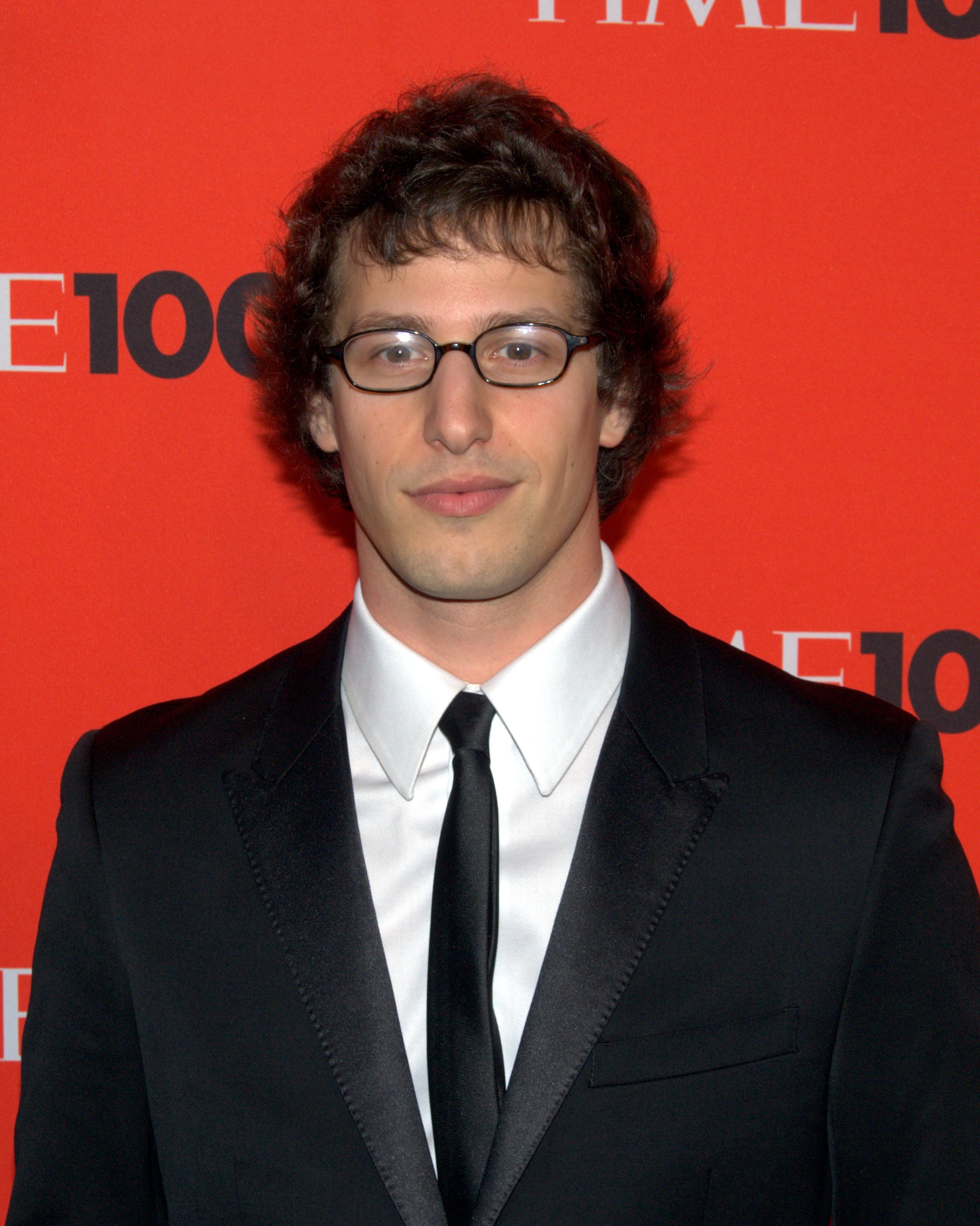
Andy Samberg

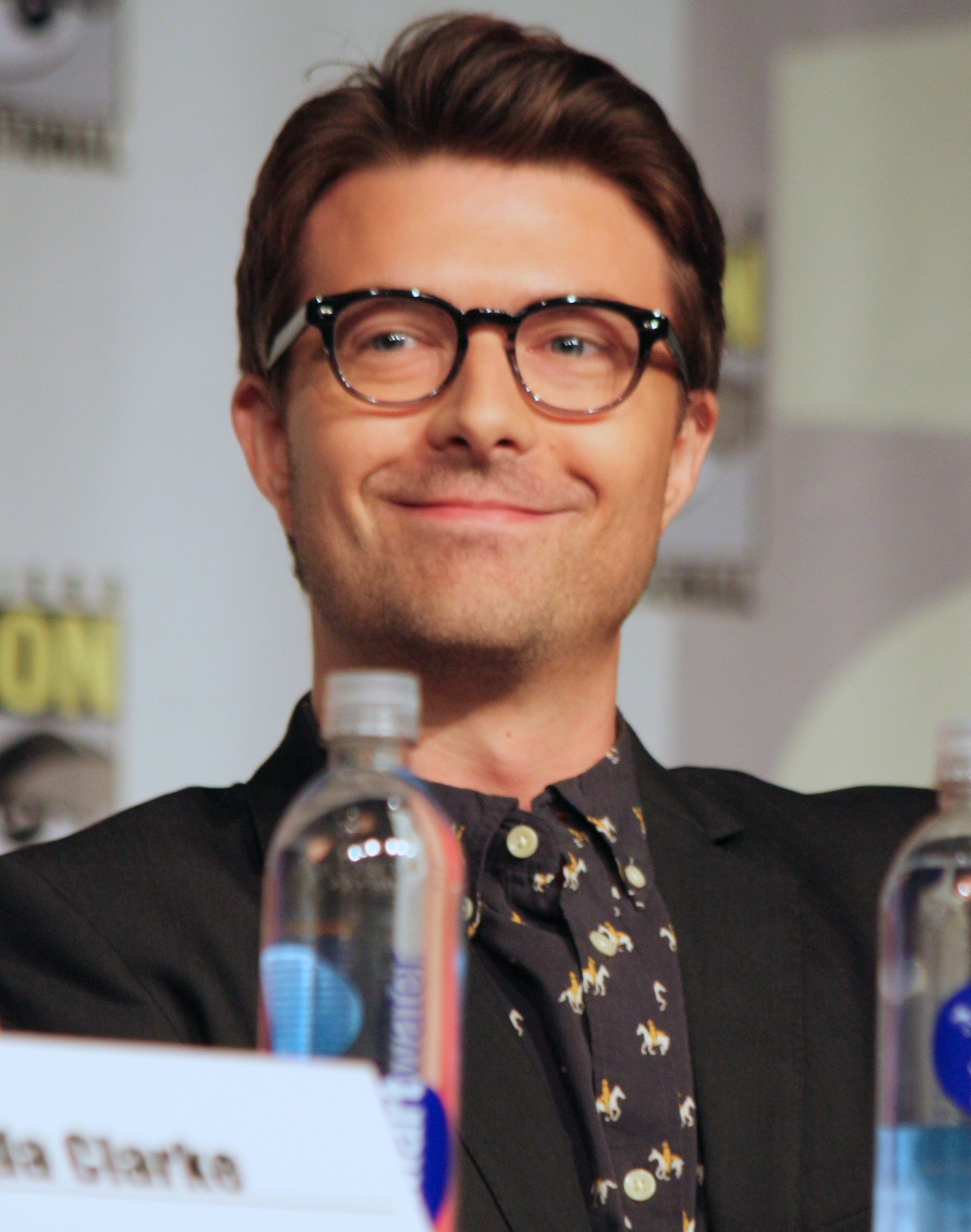
Noah Bean

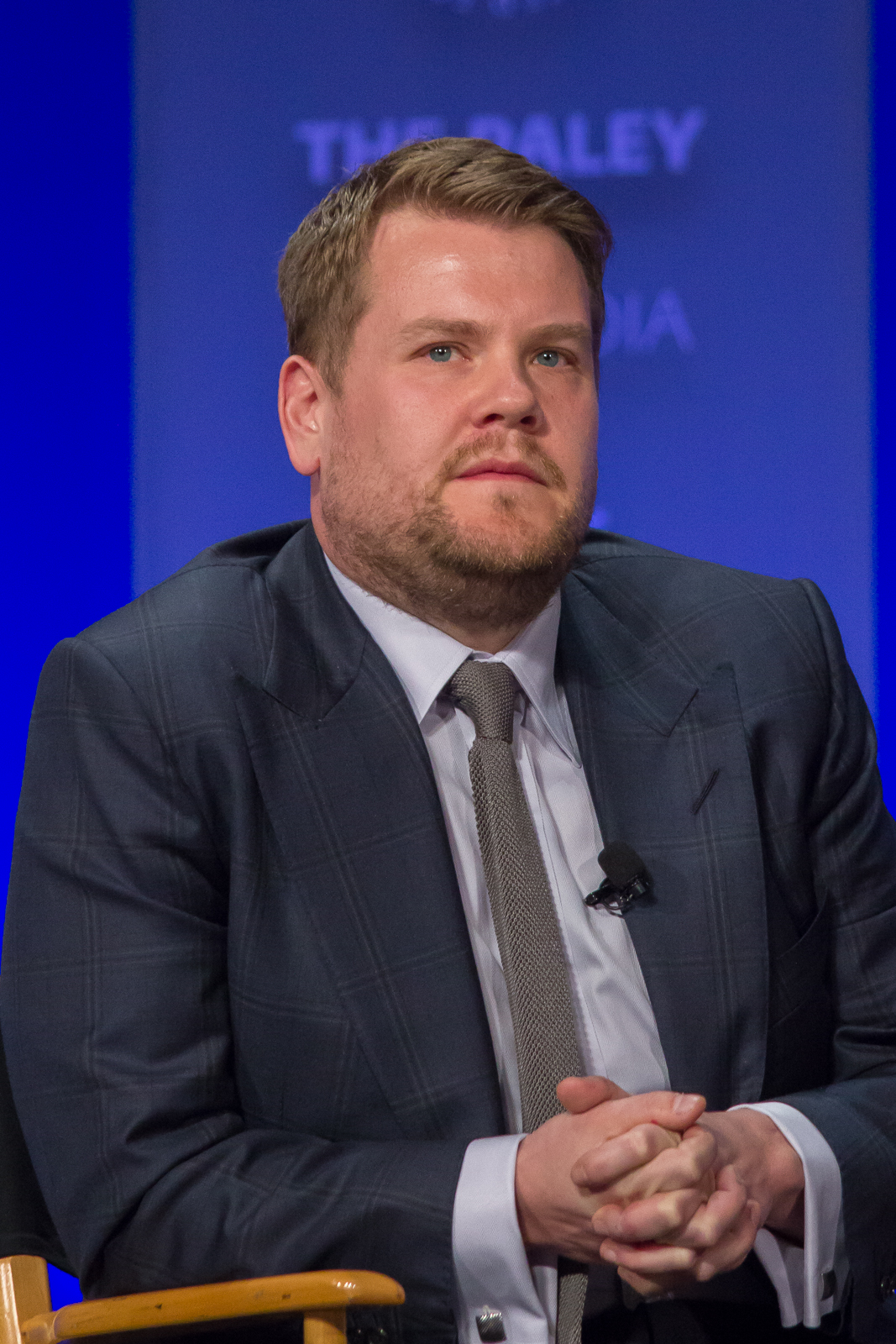
James Corden

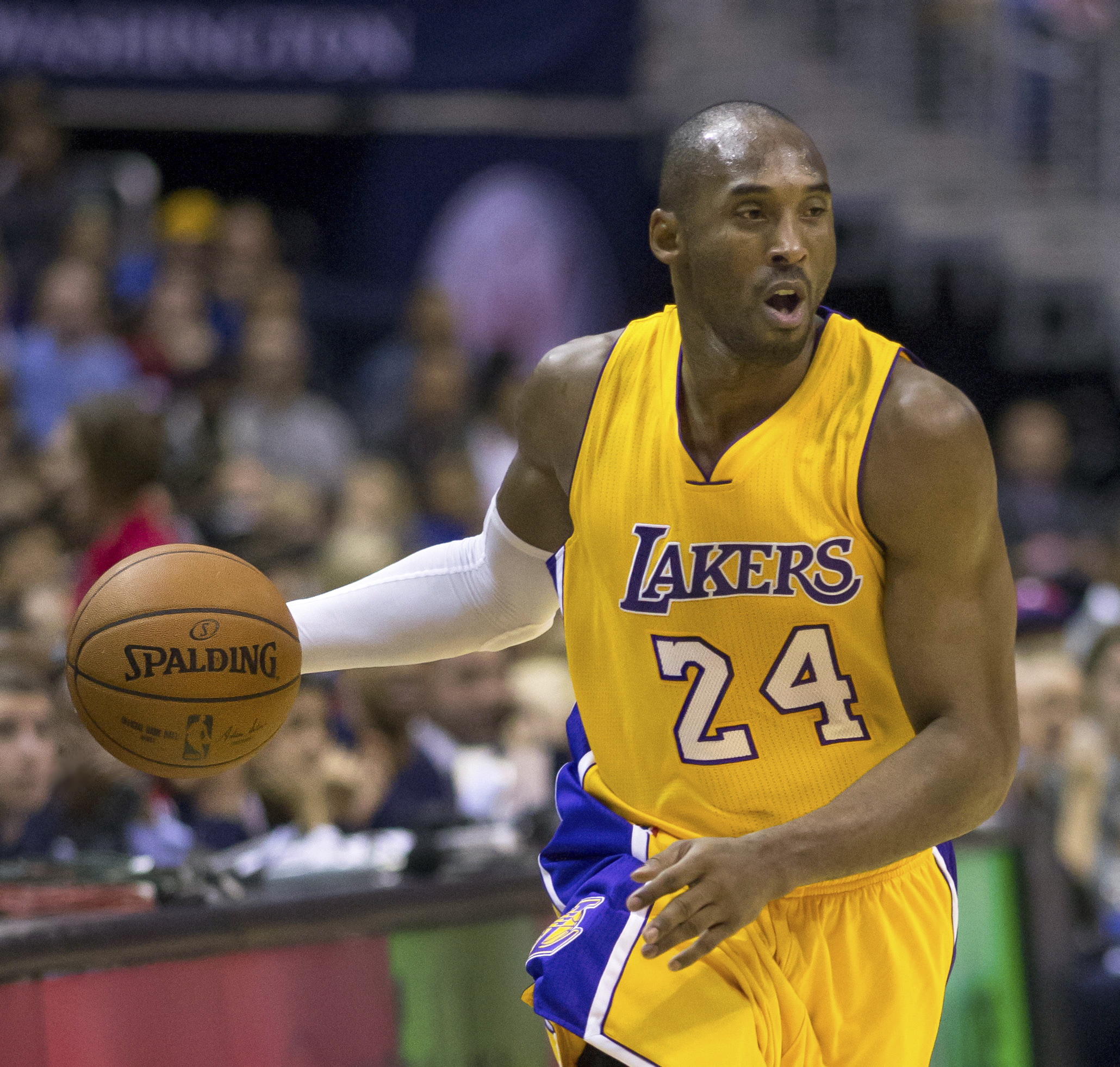
Kobe Bryant

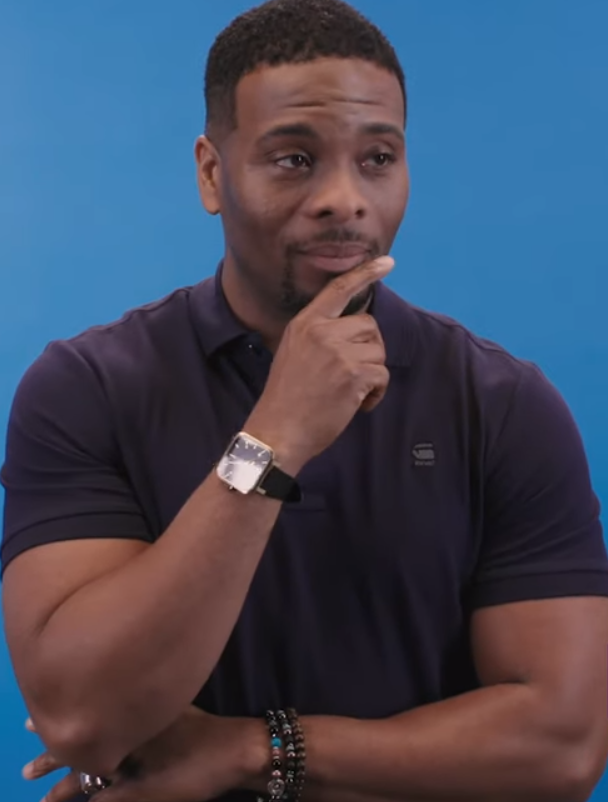
Kel Mitchell

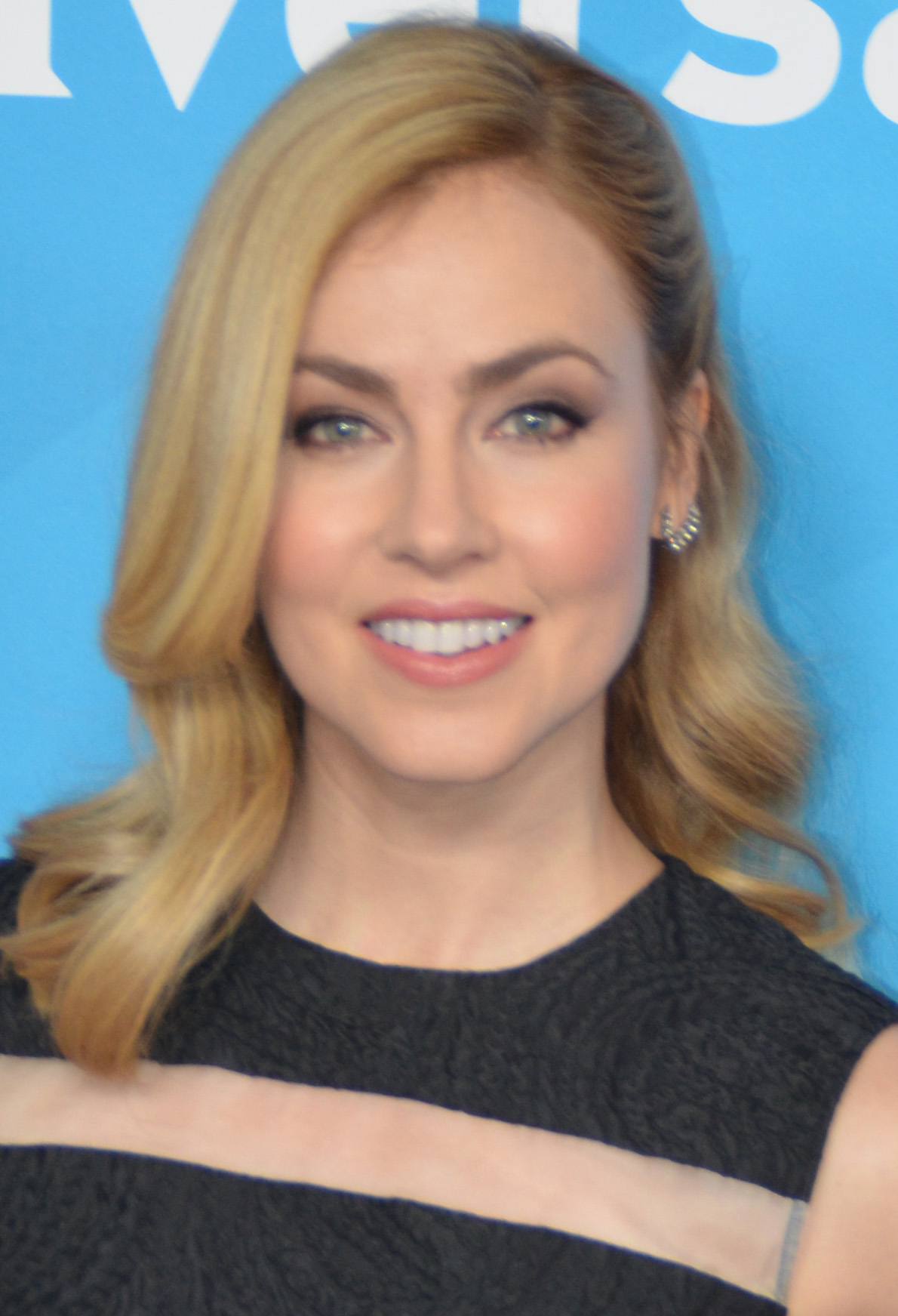
Amanda Schull

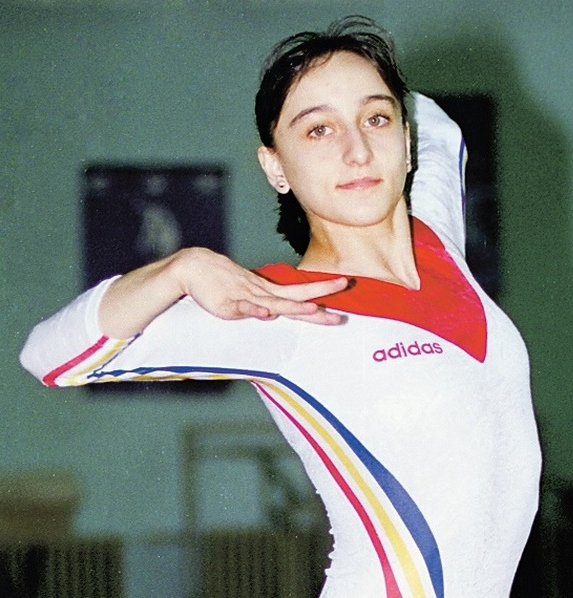
Gina Gogean

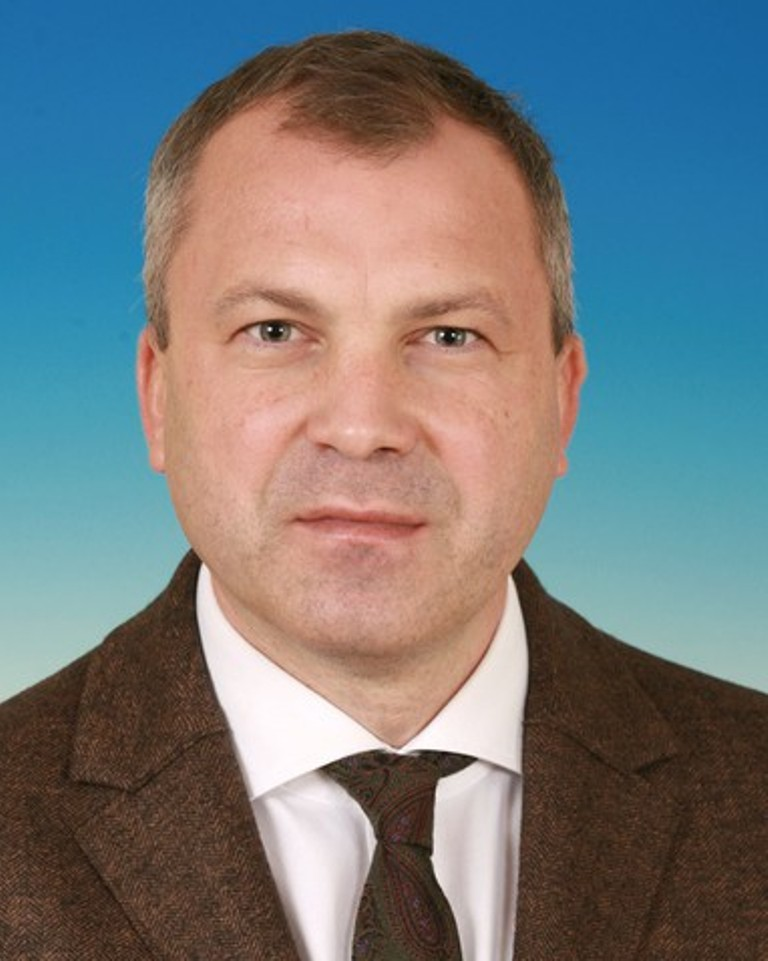
Yevgeny Popov

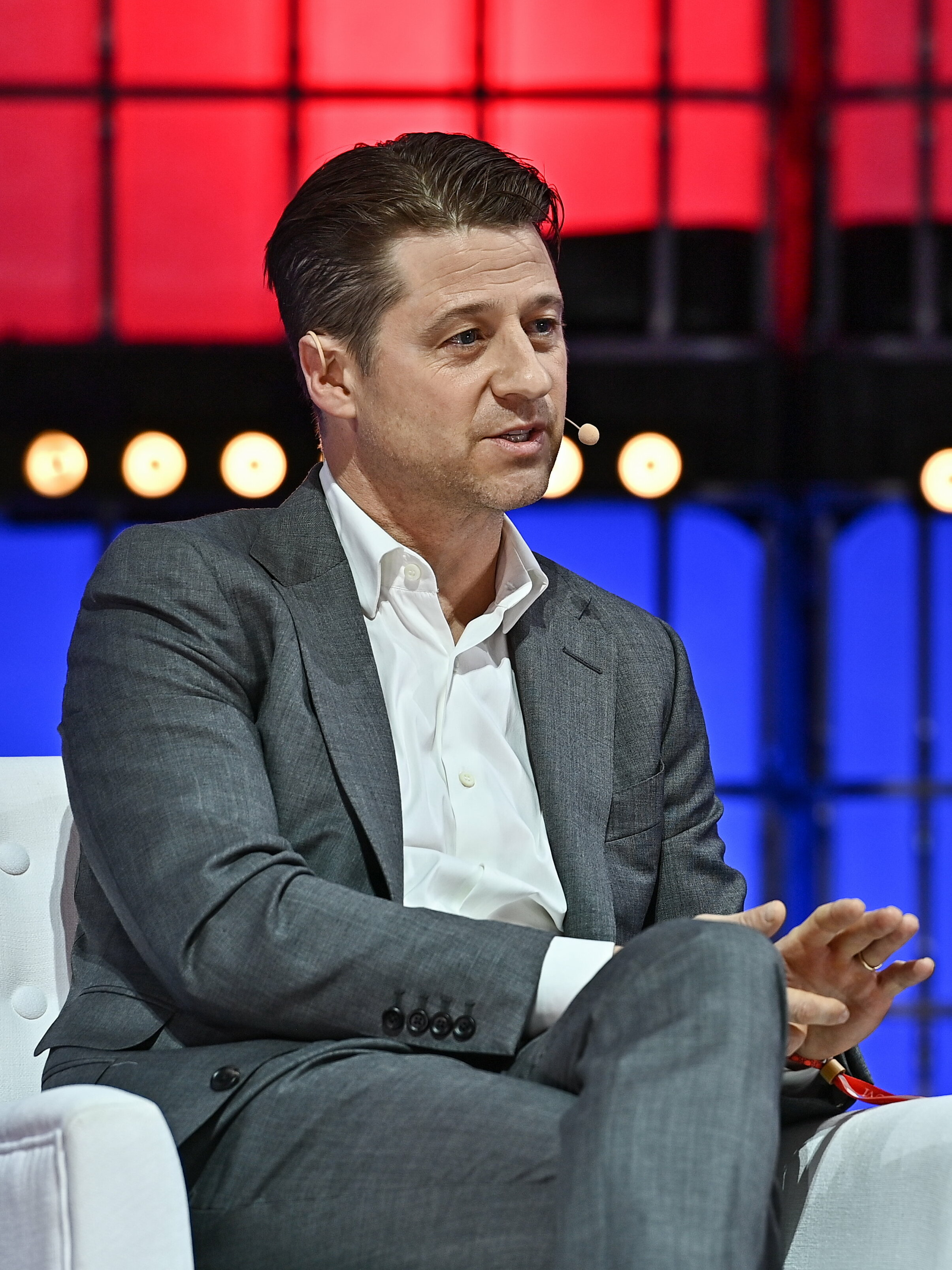
Ben McKenzie

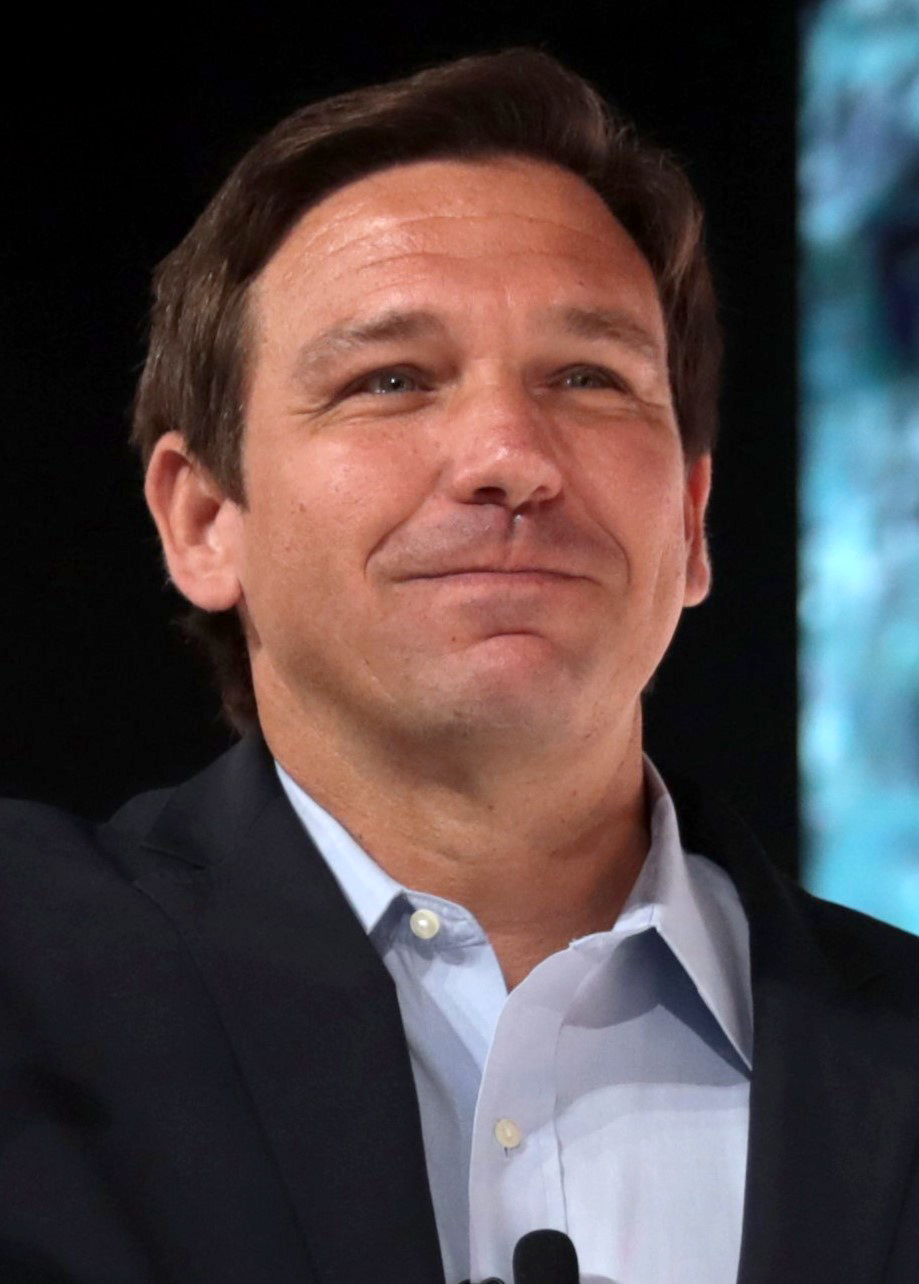
Ron DeSantis

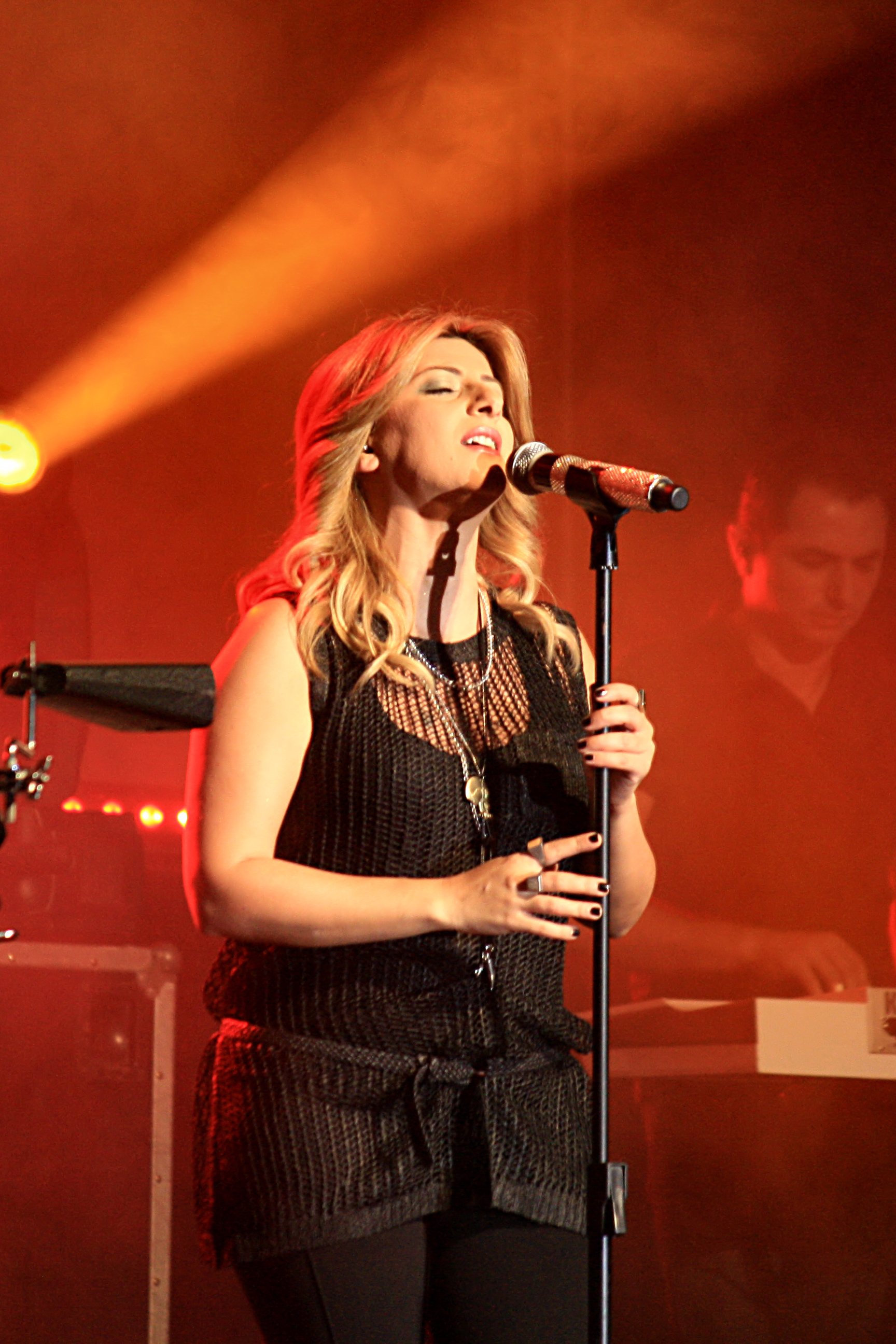
Sarit Hadad

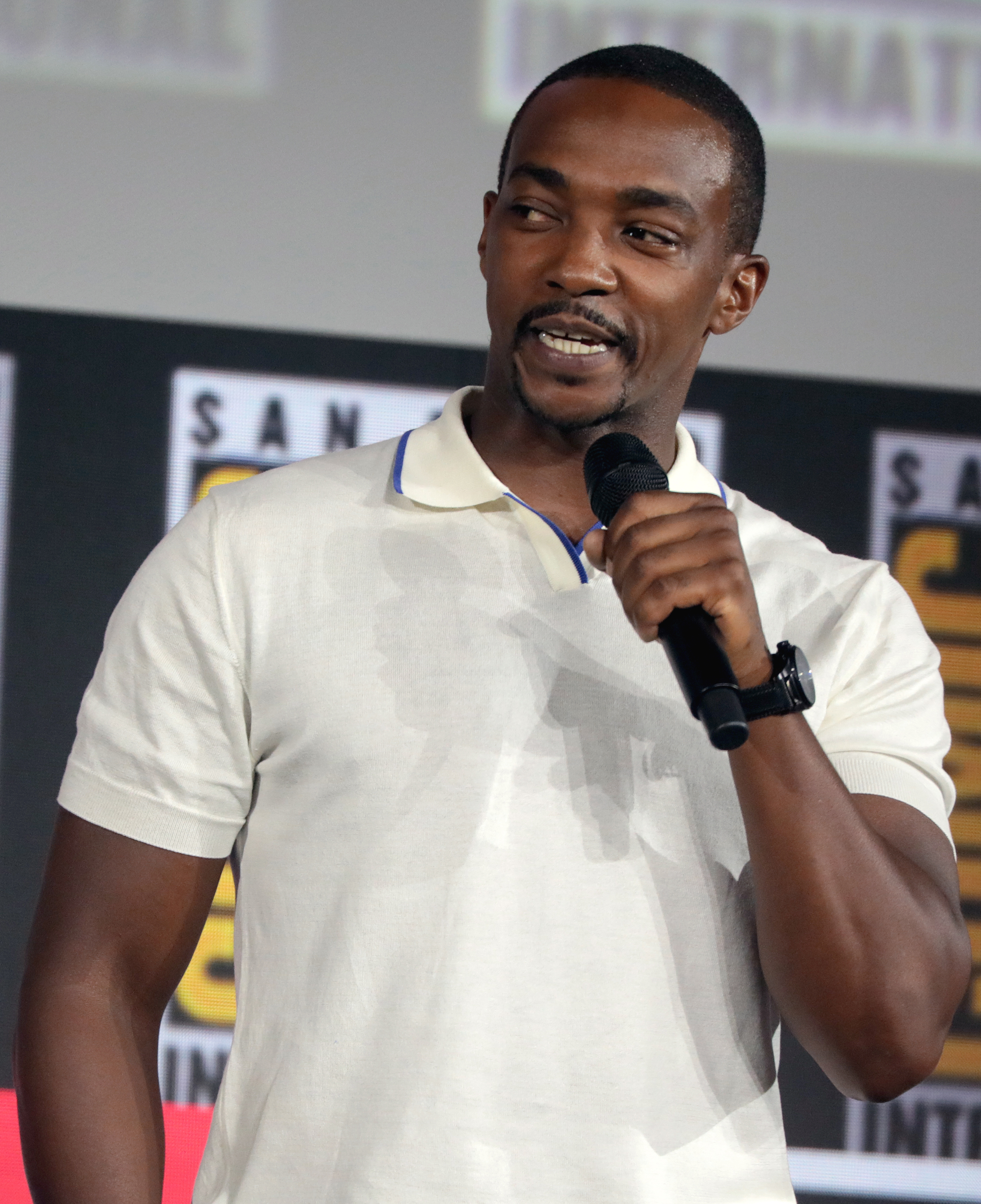
Anthony Mackie

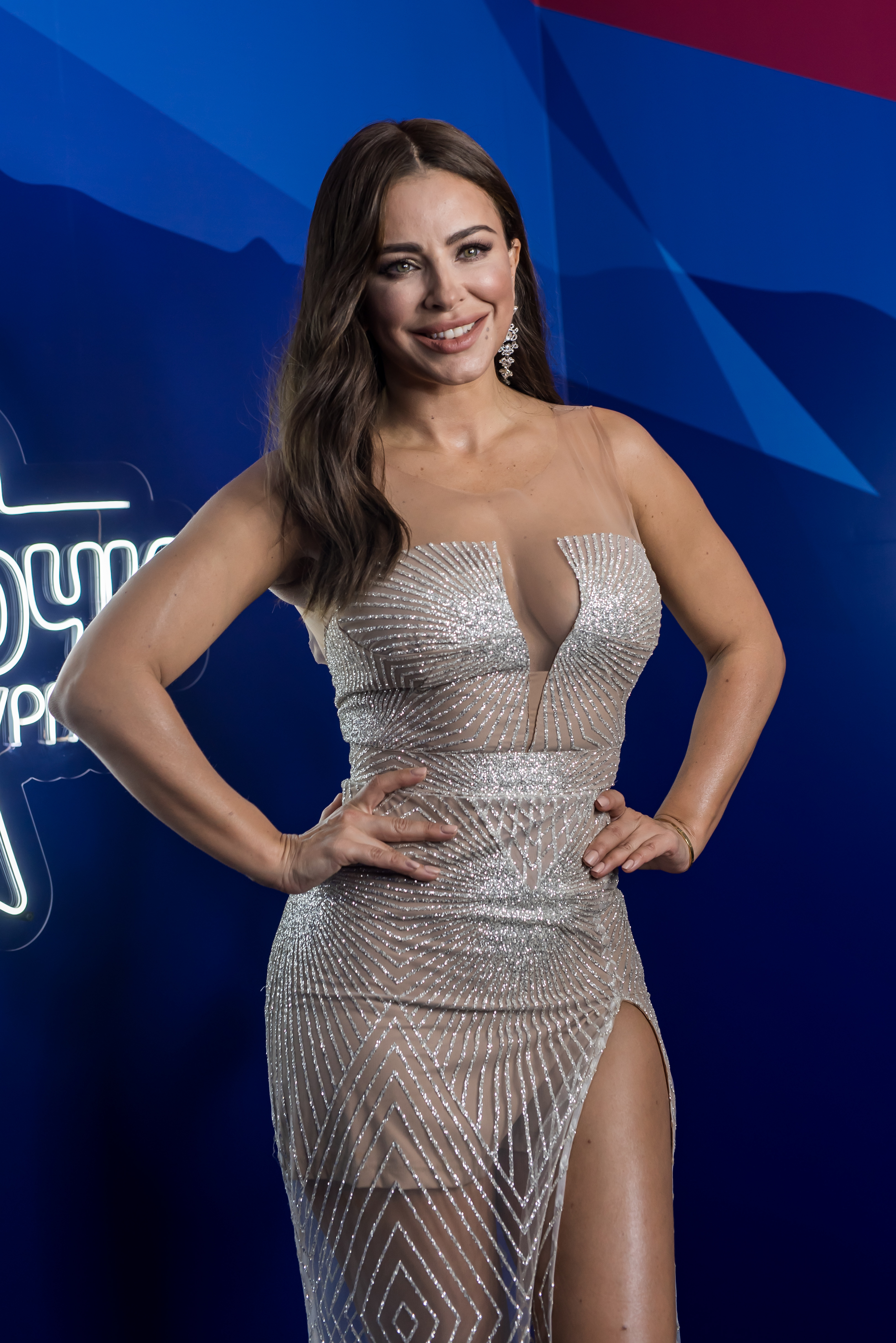
Ani Lorak

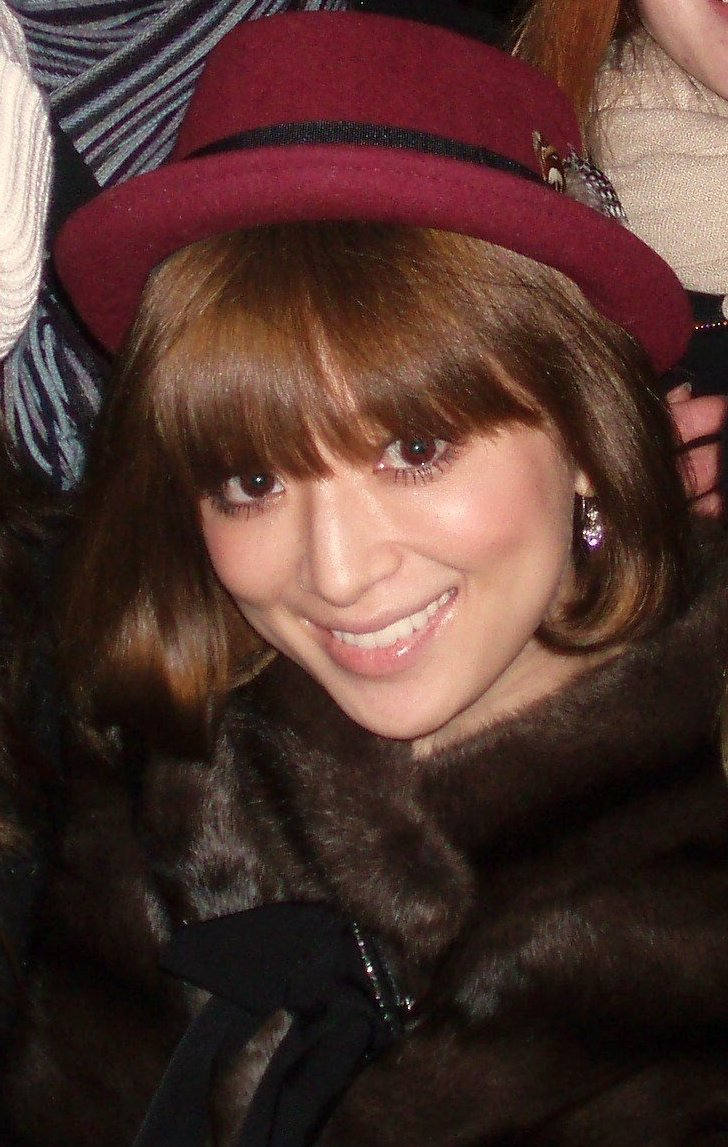
Ayumi Hamasaki

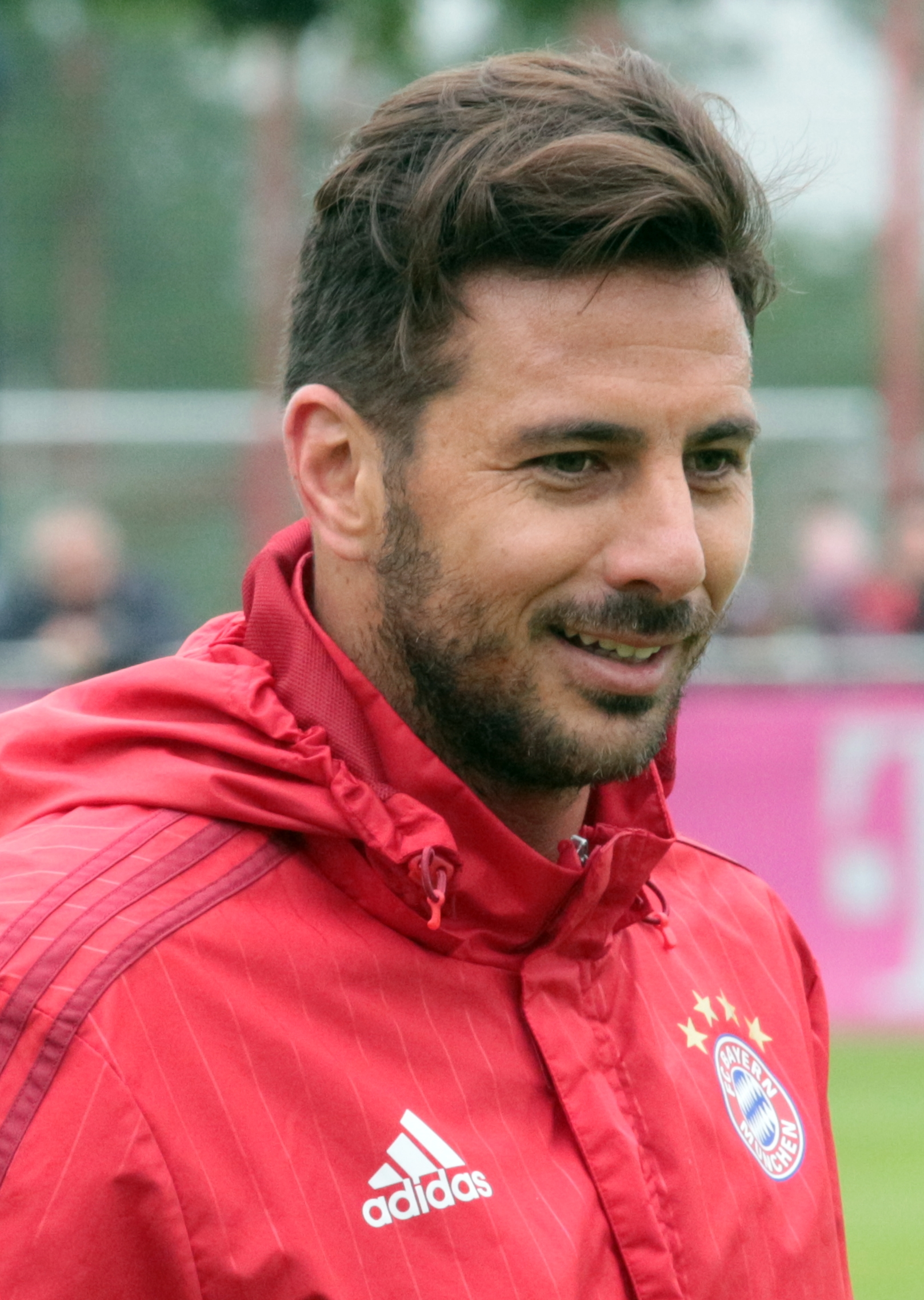
Claudio Pizarro

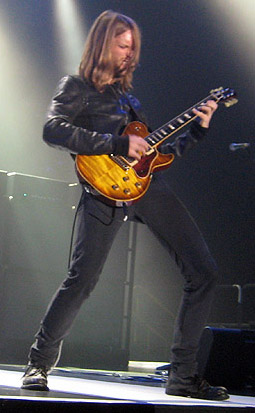
James Valentine

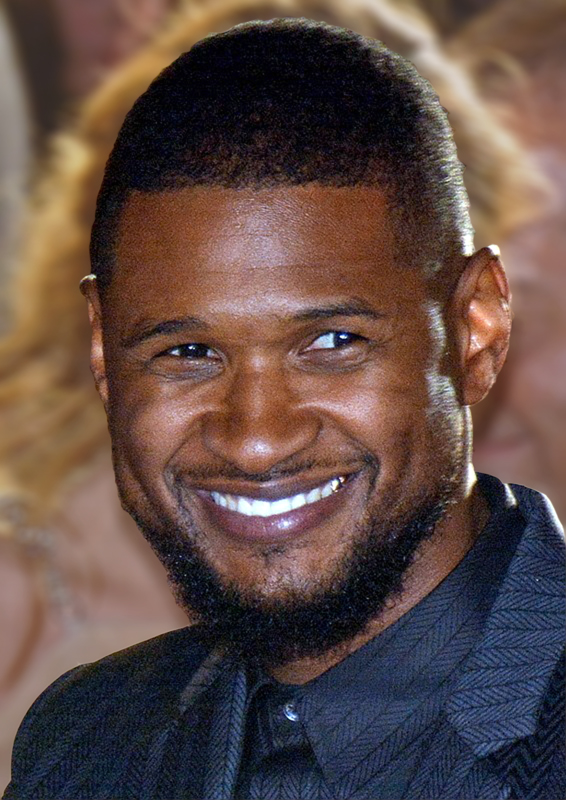
Usher

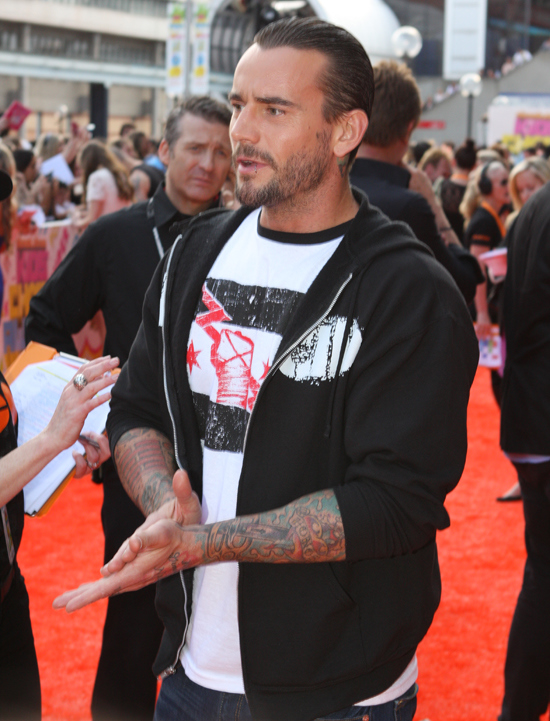
CM Punk

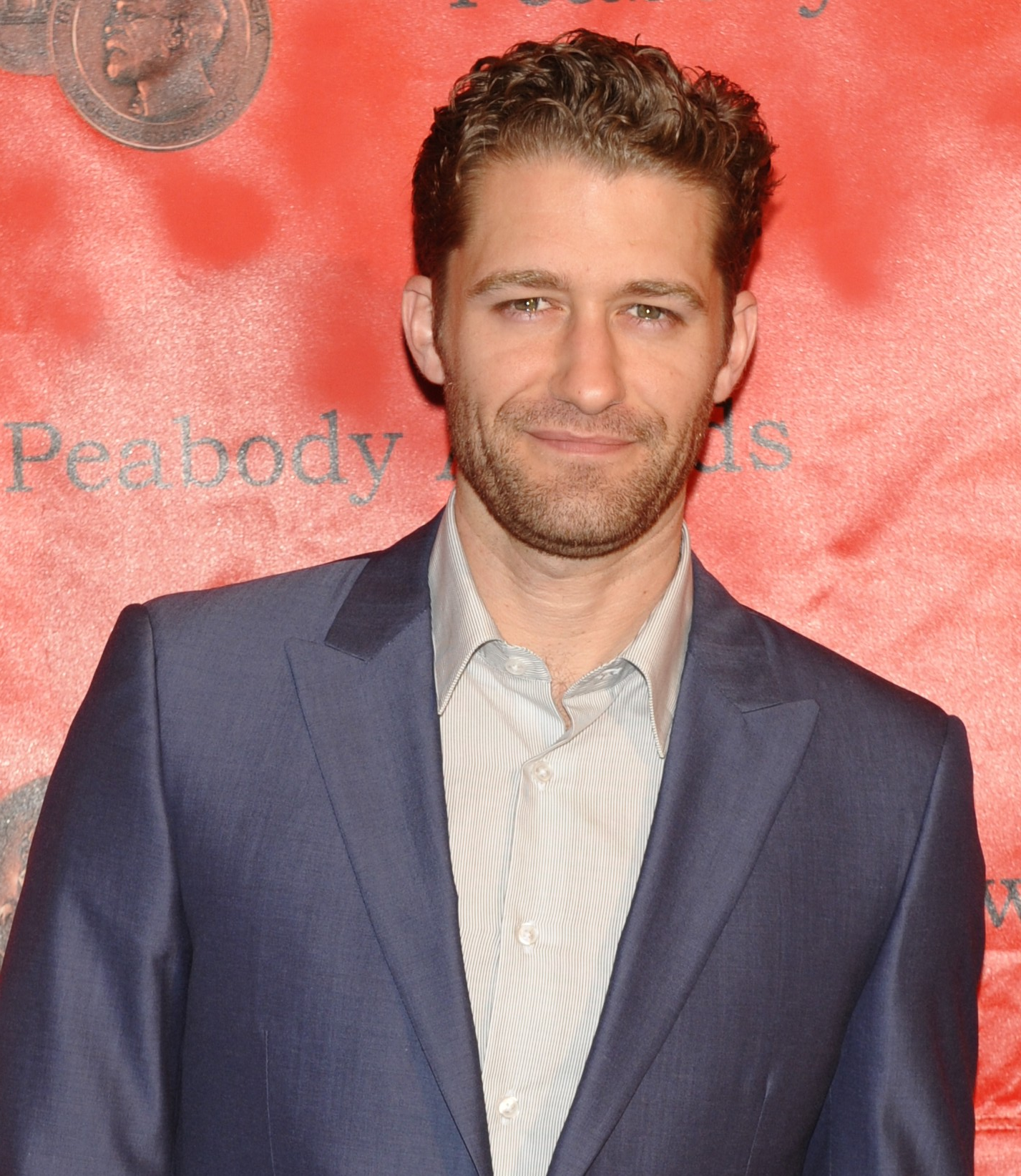
Matthew Morrison

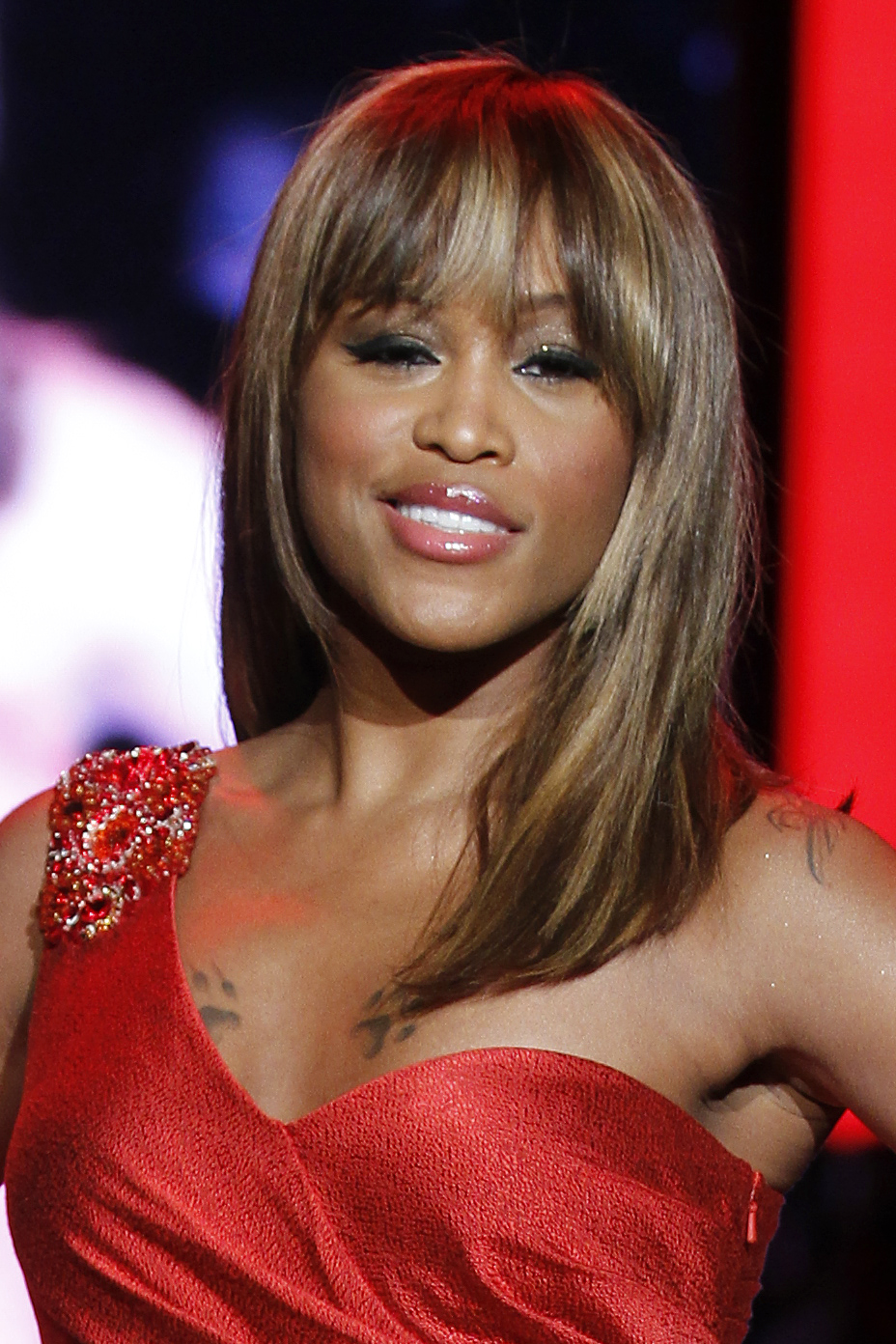
Eve

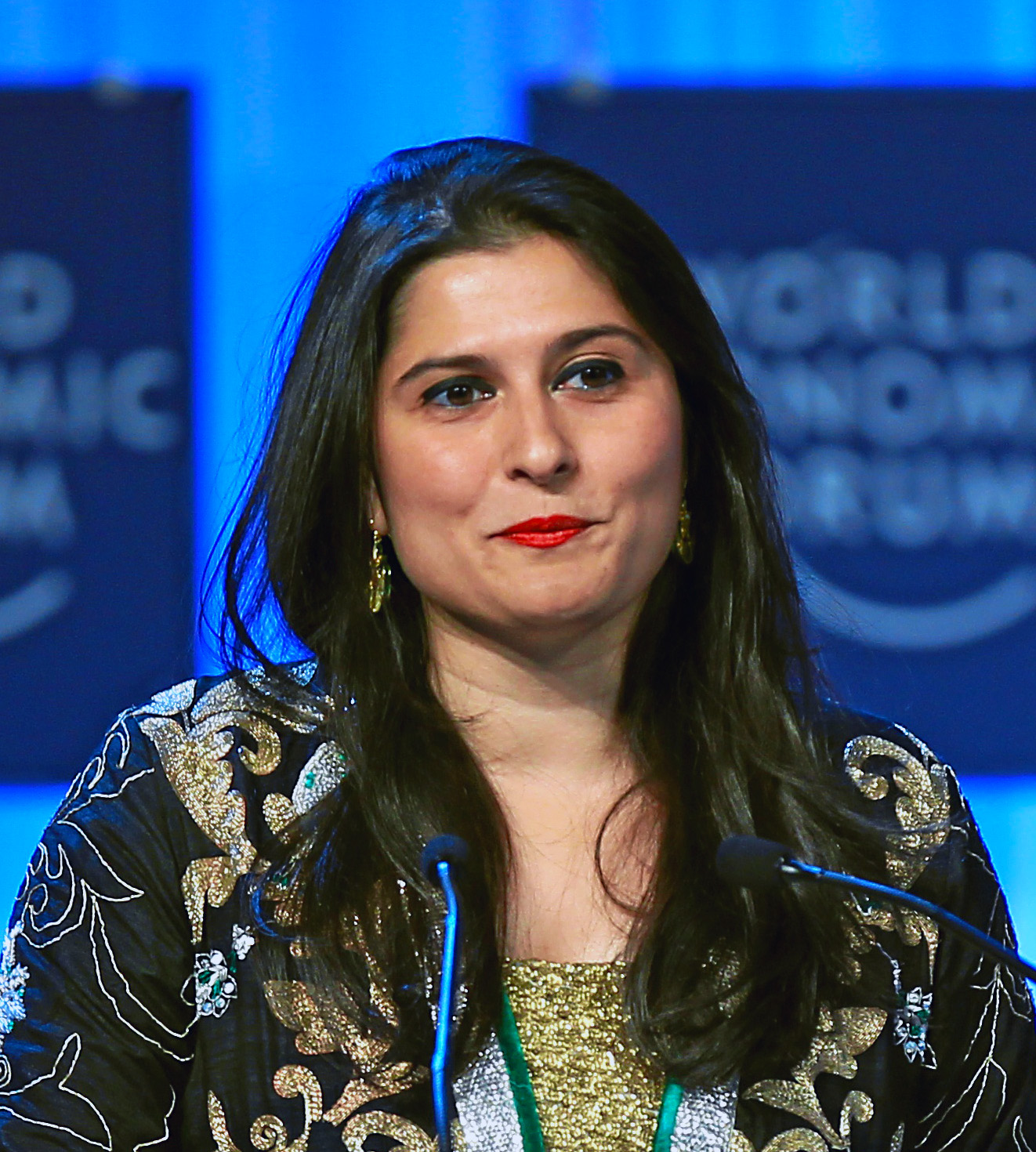
Sharmeen Obaid-Chinoy

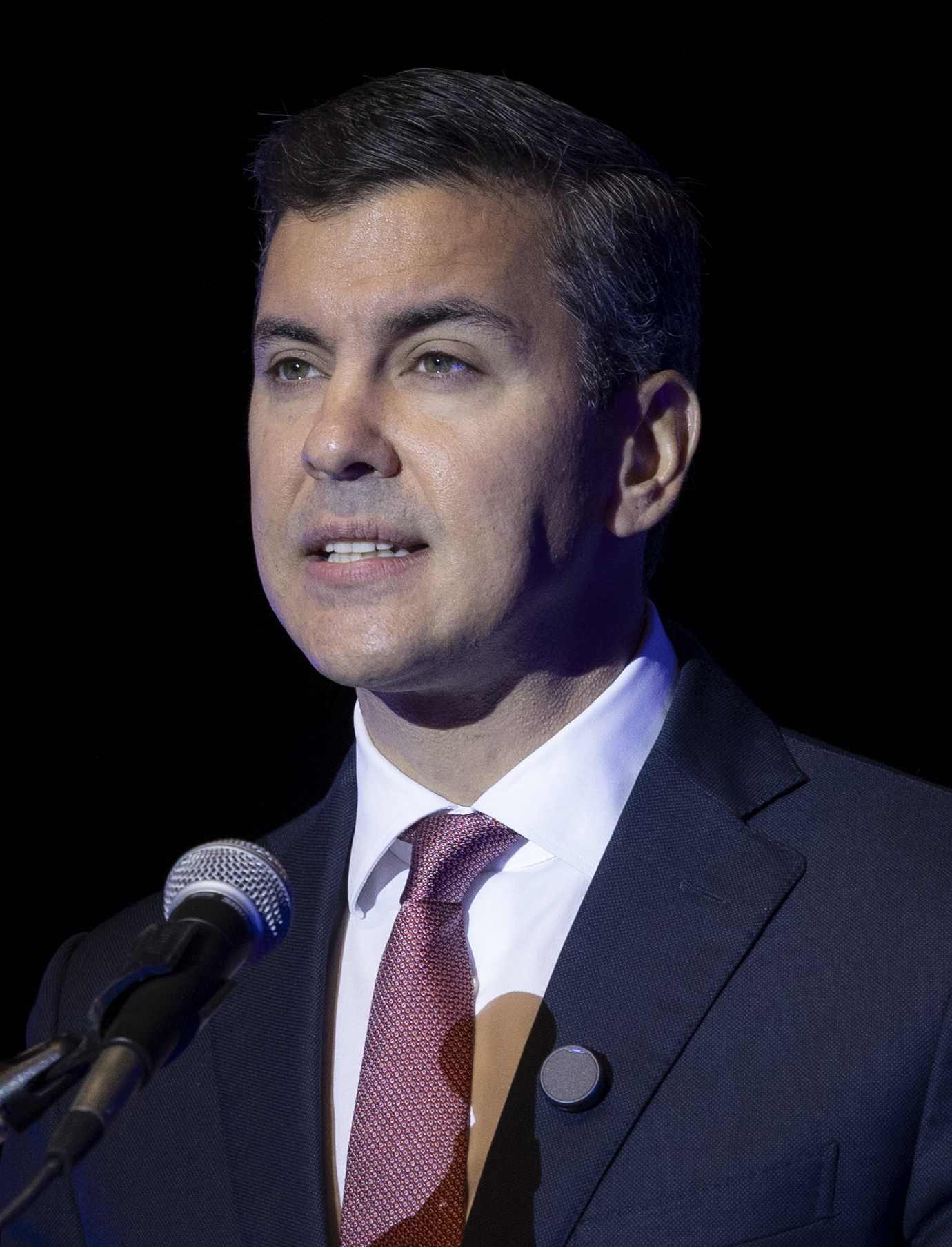
Santiago Peña

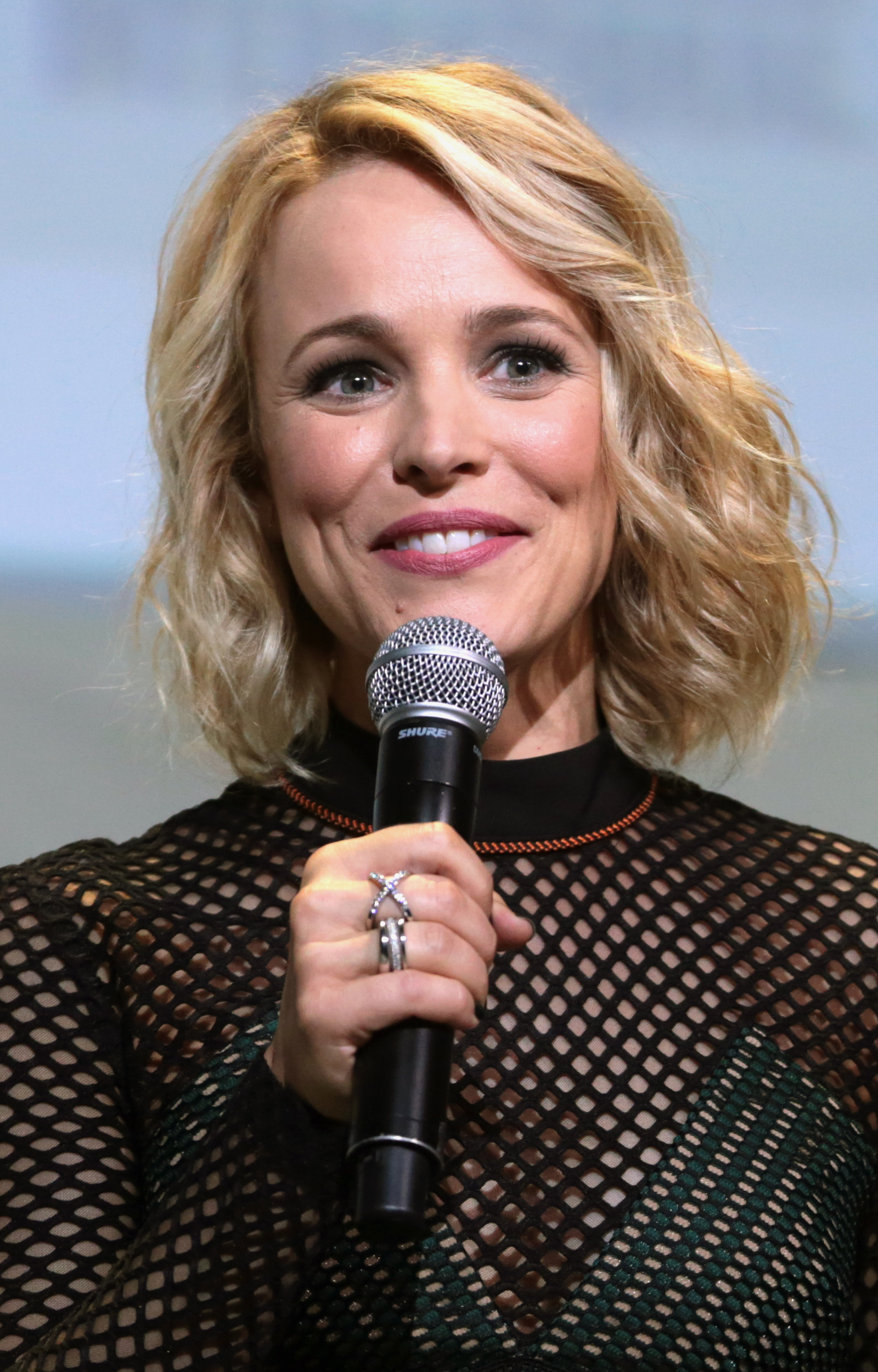
Rachel McAdams

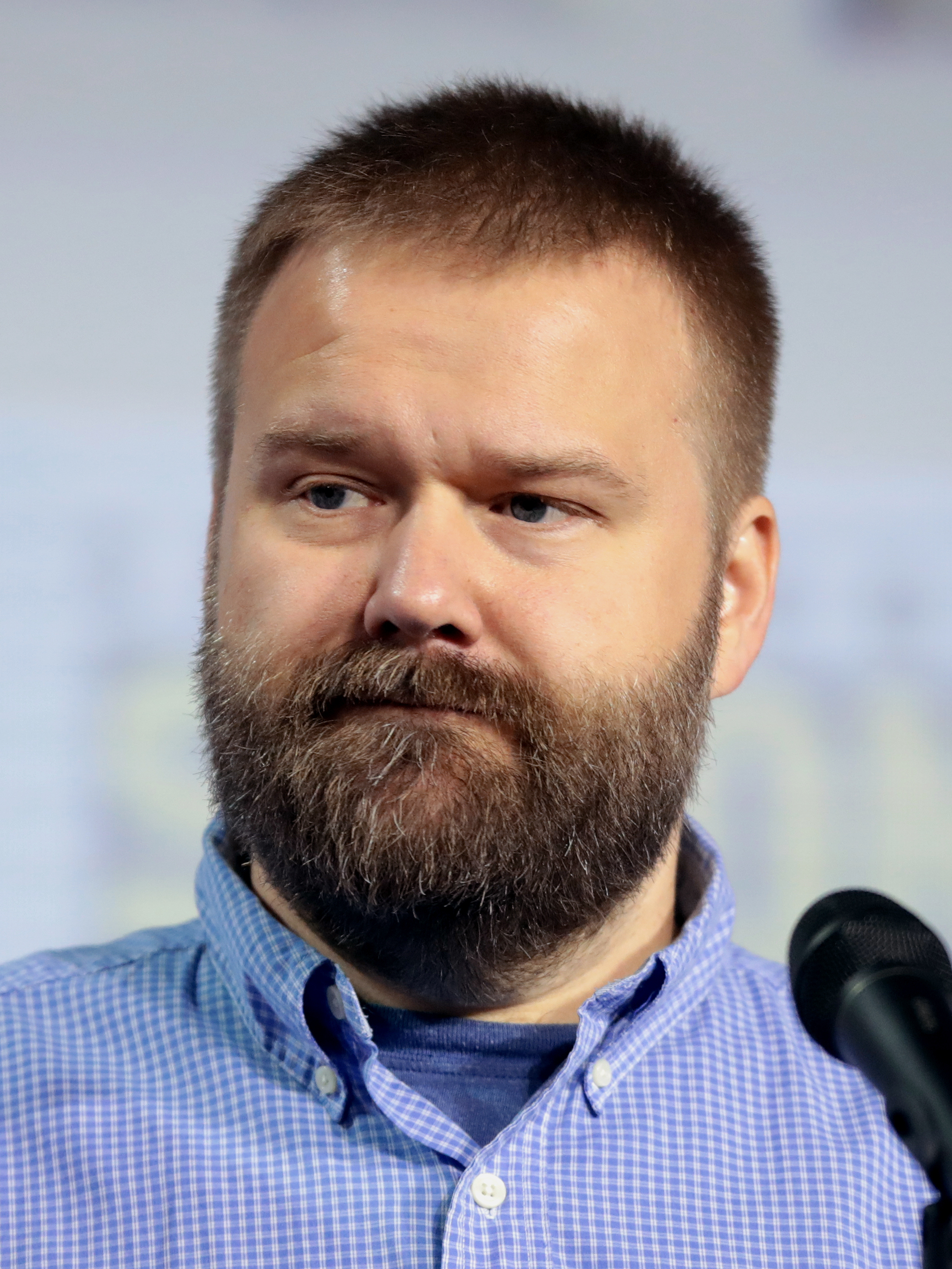
Robert Kirkman

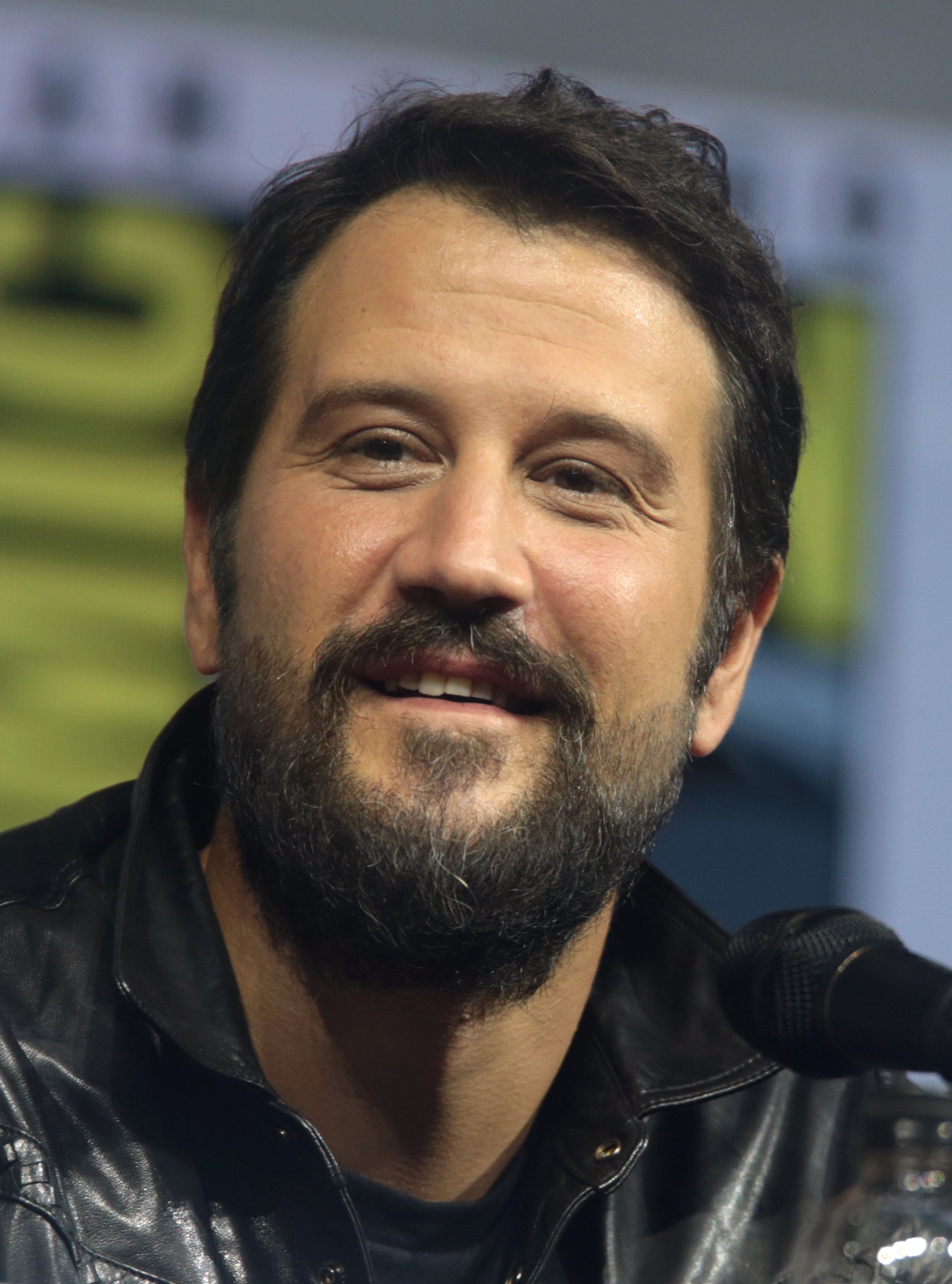
Stefan Kapičić

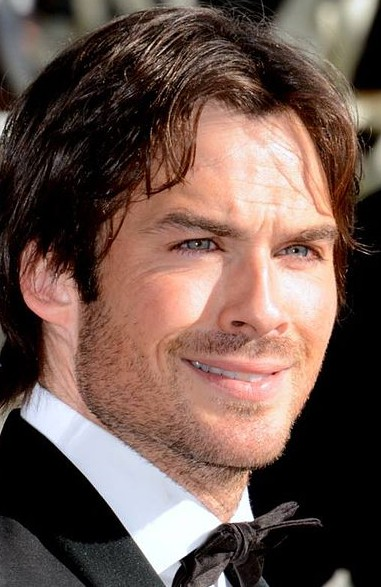
Ian Somerhalder

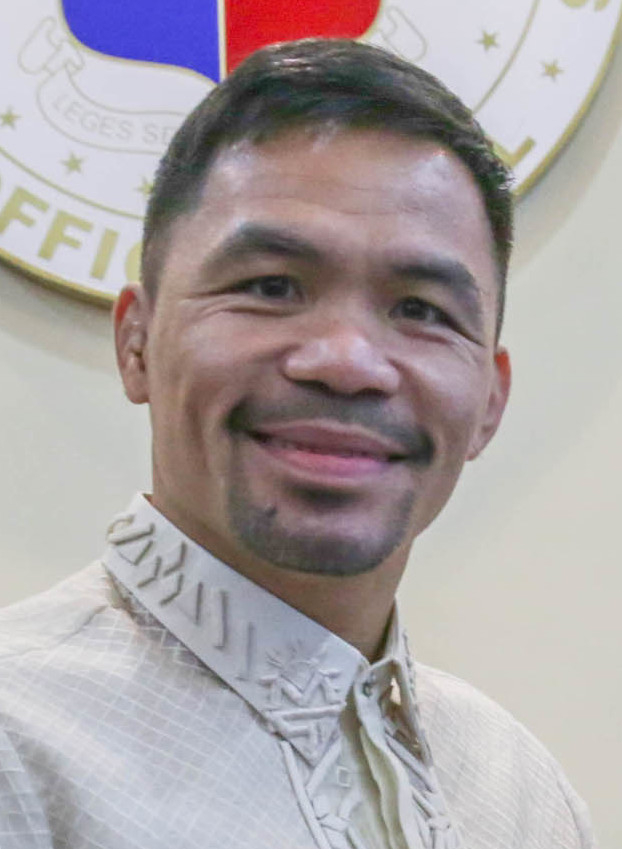
Manny Pacquiao

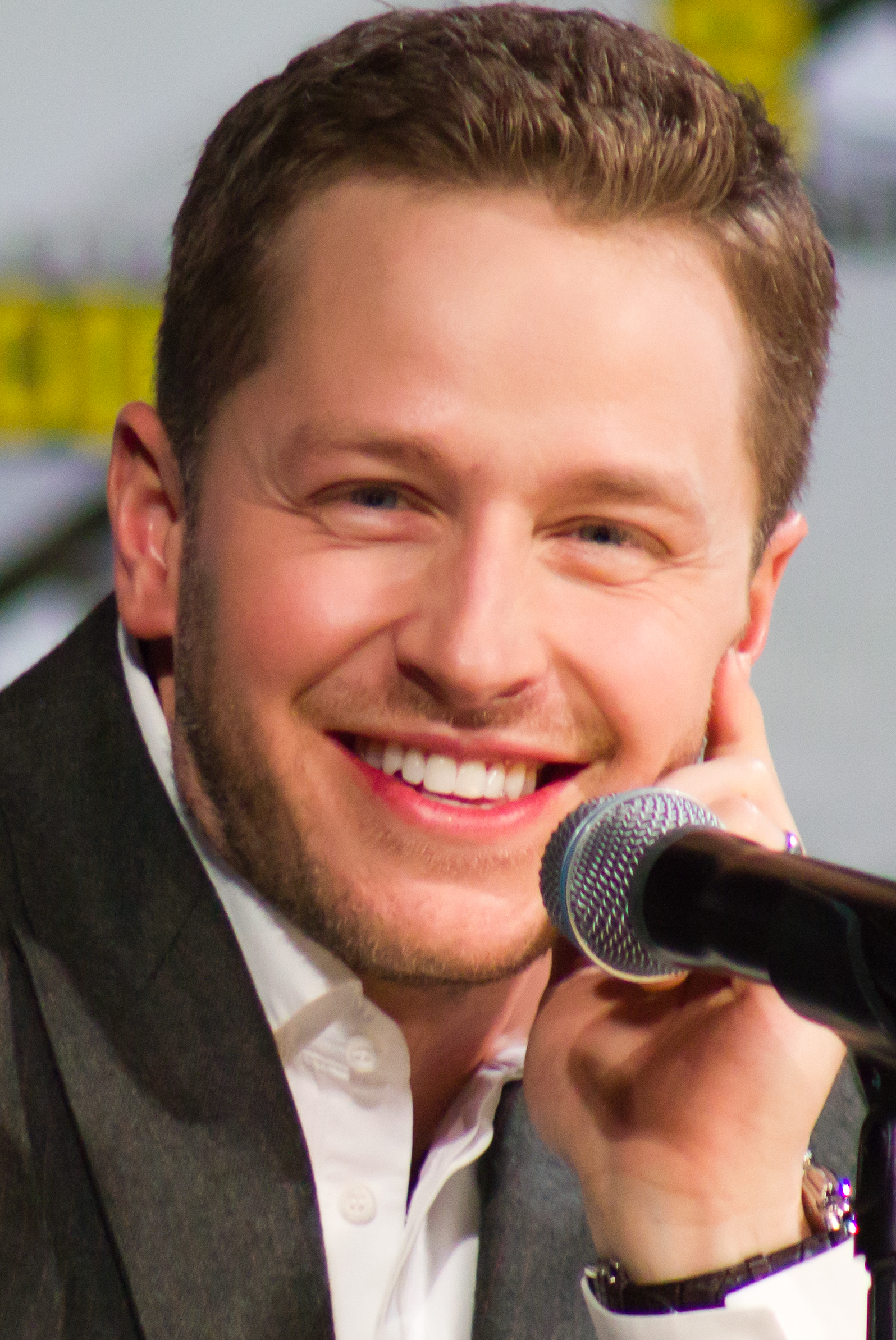
Josh Dallas

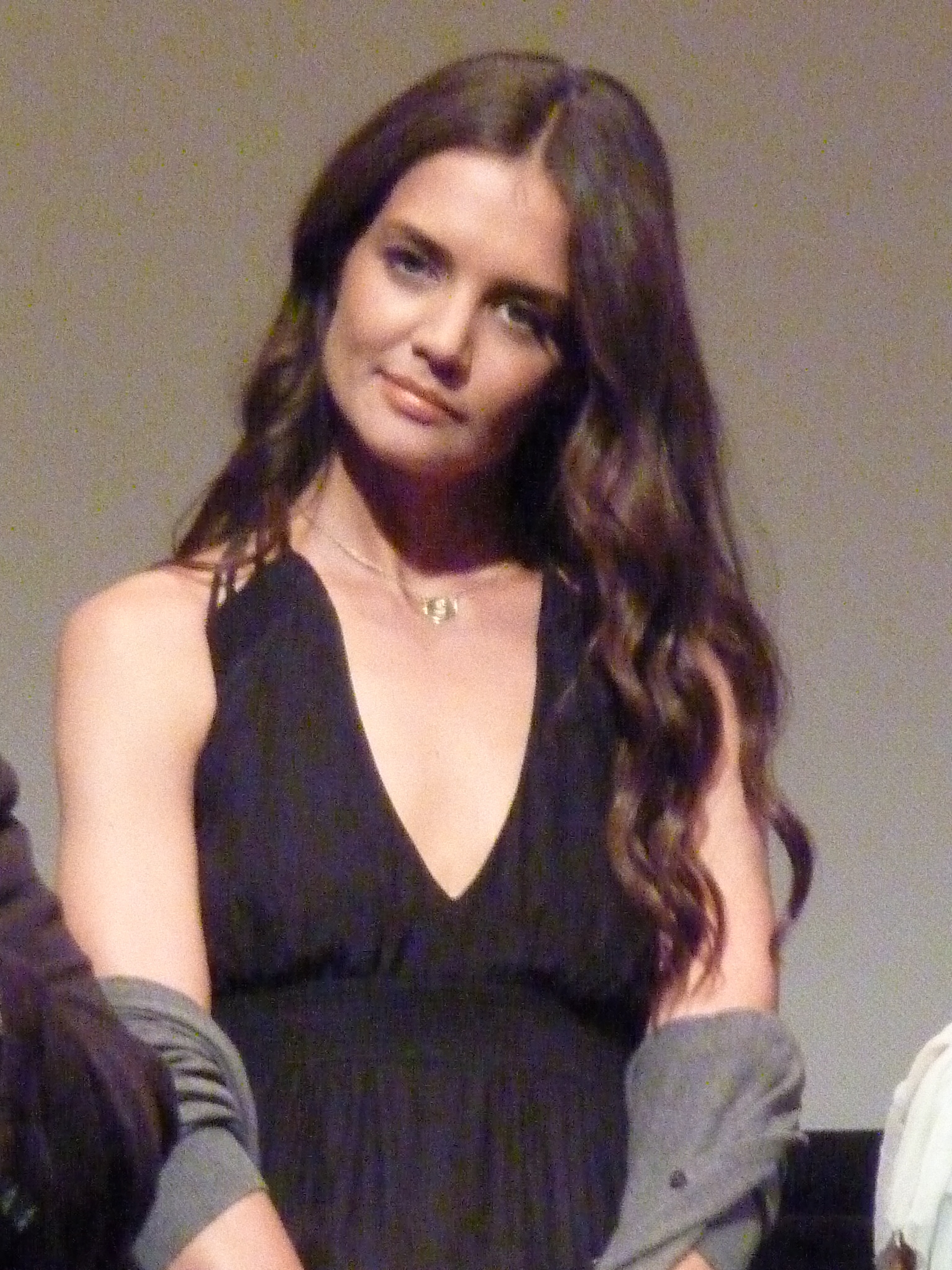
Katie Holmes

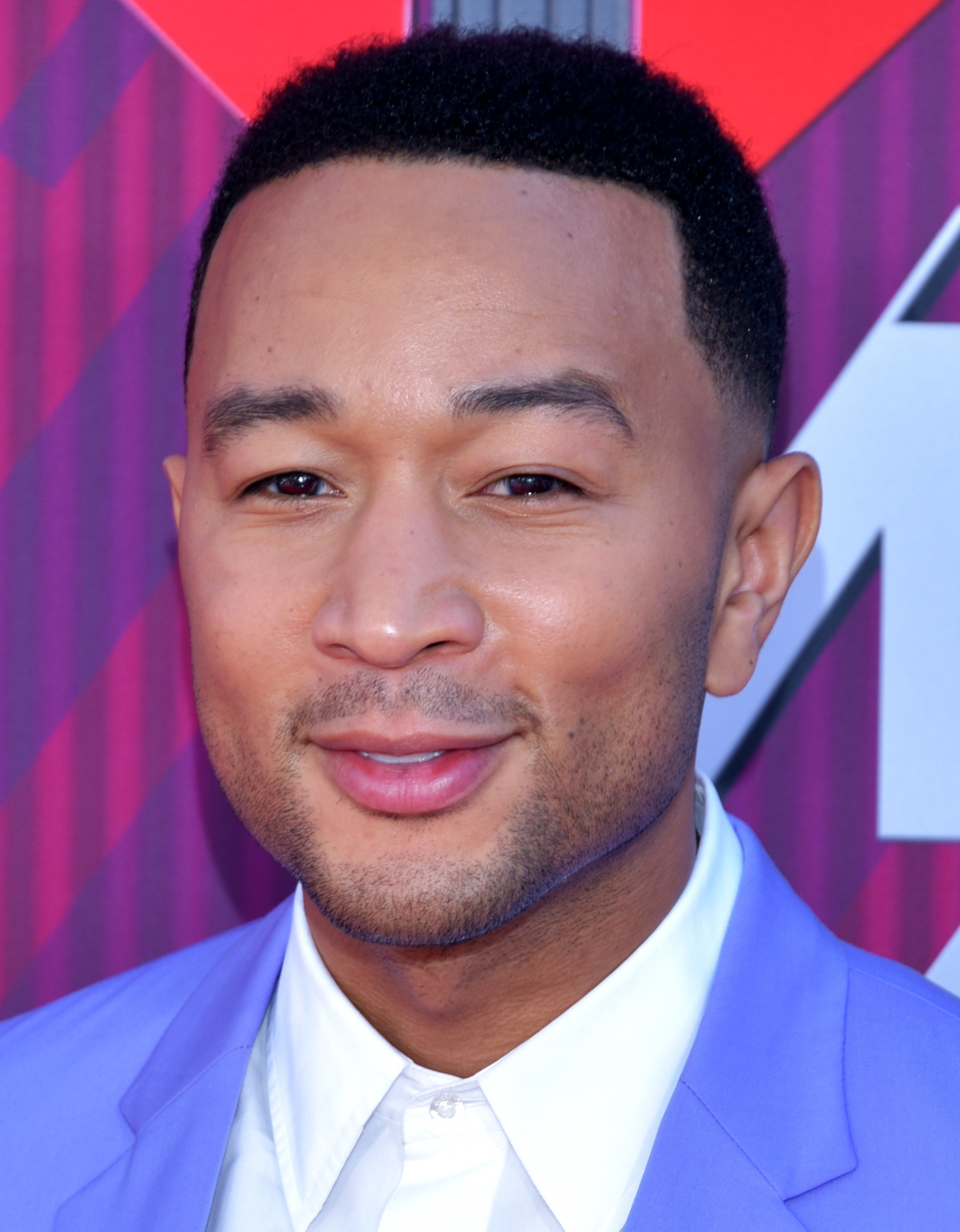
John Legend

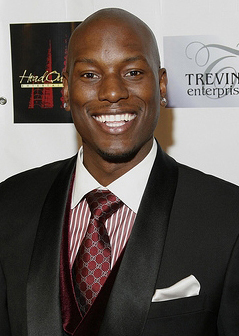
Tyrese Gibson

=== January ===
- January 1 – Philip Mulryne, Northern Irish footballer
- January 2 – Megumi Toyoguchi, Japanese voice actress
- January 2 – Karina Smirnoff, Ukrainian-American dancer
- January 3
  - Liya Kebede, Ethiopian model, clothing designer and actress
  - Park Sol-mi, South Korean actress
- January 4 – Karine Ruby, French snowboarder (d. 2009)
- January 5 – January Jones, American actress
- January 7 – Emilio Palma, Argentine citizen, first human born in Antarctica
- January 9
  - Gennaro Gattuso, Italian footballer and coach
  - Chad Johnson, American football player
  - AJ McLean, American singer
- January 10 – Kanako Mitsuhashi, Japanese voice actress
- January 11 – Emile Heskey, English footballer
- January 12 – Hannah Gadsby, Australian comedian
- January 13
  - Ashmit Patel, Indian actor
  - Mohit Sharma Indian Army Officer
- January 14 – Shawn Crawford, American sprinter
- January 15
  - Eddie Cahill, American actor
  - Franco Pellizotti, Italian cyclist
- January 16 – Vijay Sethupathi, Indian actor
- January 17
  - Susanne Schaper, German politician
  - Ricky Wilson, British vocalist (Kaiser Chiefs)
- January 18 – Thor Hushovd, Norwegian cyclist
- January 20 – Omar Sy, French actor and comedian
- January 24 – Kristen Schaal, American actress, comedian, and writer
- January 25 – Volodymyr Zelenskyy, Ukrainian politician and comedian, President of Ukraine
- January 28
  - Gianluigi Buffon, Italian footballer
  - Jamie Carragher, English footballer
  - Papa Bouba Diop, Senegalese footballer (d. 2020)
  - Sheamus, Irish professional wrestler
  - Vanessa Villela, Mexican actress

=== February ===
- February 1 – Karen Martello, Venezuelan singer and television presenter.
- February 2
  - Nelson Chamisa, Zimbabwean politician
  - Barry Ferguson, Scottish footballer and coach
- February 3
  - Joan Capdevila, Spanish footballer
  - Amal Clooney, British-Lebanese barrister, activist and author
- February 4 – Danna García, Colombian actress and model
- February 5 – Samuel Sánchez, Spanish road bicycle racer
- February 6
  - Danny Buderus, Australian rugby league player
  - Olena Zelenska, Ukrainian first lady and former model
  - Yael Naim, Israeli-French singer and songwriter
- February 7
  - Omotola Jalade Ekeinde, Nigerian actress, singer, philanthropist and former model
  - Ashton Kutcher, American actor
  - Ivan Leko, Croatian football player and coach
  - Daniel Van Buyten, Belgian footballer
- February 10
  - Isabella Eklöf, Swedish screenwriter and film director
  - Don Omar (stage name for William Omar Landrón Rivera), Puerto Rican American rapper known as the "King of Reggaeton"; in San Juan
- February 12
  - Gethin Jones, Welsh television presenter
  - Silver Meikar, Estonian politician
- February 13 – Niklas Bäckström, Finnish hockey player
- February 14
  - Richard Hamilton, American basketball player
  - Danai Gurira, Zimbabwean-American actress and playwright
  - Darius Songaila, Lithuanian basketball player
- February 15 – Rafał Romanowski, Polish politician
- February 16
  - Tia Hellebaut, Belgian athlete
  - Yekaterina Volkova, Russian middle-distance runner
- February 19 – Immortal Technique, Peruvian-American rapper
- February 20
  - Julia Jentsch, German actress
  - Ken Takeuchi, Japanese voice actor
- February 21
  - Kim Ha-neul, South Korean actress
  - Miki Sakai, Japanese actress
- February 24 – Gary, South Korean musician, entertainer
- February 25 – Yuji Nakazawa, Japanese footballer
- February 27 – Kakha Kaladze, Georgian footballer and politician, Mayor of Tbilisi
- February 28
  - Jeanne Cherhal, French singer-songwriter
  - Yasir Hameed, Pakistani cricketer
  - Benjamin Raich, Austrian skier

=== March ===
- March 1
  - Jensen Ackles, American actor
  - Liya Kebede, Ethiopian model and fashion designer
  - Sakura Nogawa, Japanese voice actress
- March 2
  - Jim Chalmers, Australian politician, Treasurer of Australia (2022-present)
  - Tomáš Kaberle, Czech hockey player
- March 3 – Tanishaa Mukerji, Indian actress
- March 4 – Denis Dallan, Italian rugby union footballer
- March 11
  - Didier Drogba, Ivorian footballer
  - Ha Jung-woo, South Korean actor and director
- March 13 – Tom Danielson, American cyclist
- March 14
  - Pieter van den Hoogenband, Dutch swimmer
  - Carl Johan Bergman, Swedish biathlete
  - Moon Hee-joon, Korean singer
- March 15 – Flavio Furtado, Cape Verdean boxer
- March 16
  - Matthew Montgomery, American actor
  - Brooke Burns, American fashion model and actress
- March 17 – Pilar Rubio, Spanish reporter and TV presenter
- March 18
  - Fernandão, Brazilian footballer (d.2014)
  - Antonio Margarito, Mexican-American boxer
  - Yoshie Takeshita, Japanese volleyball player
- March 19 – Lenka, Australian singer and actress
- March 21 – Rani Mukerji, Indian actress
- March 22 – Vanessa Senior, Venezuelan comedian and actress.
- March 23
  - Nicholle Tom, American actress
  - Perez Hilton, American actor and blogger
- March 24 – Tomáš Ujfaluši, Czech footballer
- March 27 – Romesh Ranganathan, English-Pakistani comedian and actor
- March 29 – Igor Rakočević, Serbian basketball player

=== April ===
- April 2 – Nick Berg, American businessman (d. 2004)
- April 3
  - Matthew Goode, English actor
  - Tommy Haas, German tennis player
  - John Smit, South African rugby union player
- April 4 – Sam Moran, Australian singer
- April 5
  - Franziska van Almsick, German swimmer
  - Arnaud Tournant, French track cyclist
- April 6
  - Myleene Klass, British singer, pianist, and model
  - Martín Méndez, Uruguayan musician and songwriter
  - Lauren Ridloff, African-American actress
- April 7
  - Duncan James, English singer
  - Adrienne Haan, German-Luxembourgish actress, singer, writer and producer
- April 9
  - Jorge Andrade, Portuguese footballer
  - Takashi Ohara, Japanese voice actor
  - Rachel Stevens, English singer
- April 10 – Rokhaya Diallo, French writer and filmmaker
- April 12 – Guy Berryman, Scottish musician
- April 13 – Sylvie Meis, Dutch model and television host
- April 15 – Luis Fonsi, Puerto Rican singer and songwriter
- April 16
  - Lara Dutta, Indian actress and beauty queen
  - Matthew Lloyd, Australian rules footballer
- April 17
  - Juan Guillermo Castillo, Uruguayan goalkeeper
  - Jason White, Scottish rugby union player
- April 19
  - James Franco, American actor
  - Gabriel Heinze, Argentine football player and coach
- April 21 – Jukka Nevalainen, Finnish drummer
- April 25 – Duncan Kibet, Kenyan long-distance runner
- April 26
  - Stana Katic, Canadian-American actress
  - Shinnosuke Tachibana, Japanese voice actor

=== May ===
- May 2 - Kumail Nanjiani, Pakistani-American actor and comedian
- May 4
  - Daisuke Ono, Japanese voice actor
  - Ognjen Jovanić, Croatian chess grandmaster
- May 6
  - Tony Estanguet, French slalom canoeist
  - Aleksandr Fyodorov, Russian bodybuilder
- May 8 – Lúcio, Brazilian footballer
- May 10
  - Kenan Thompson, African-American actor and comedian
  - Princess Lalla Salma of Morocco, former princess consort of Morocco
- May 11
  - Laetitia Casta, French supermodel and actress
  - Judy Ann Santos, Filipino actress
- May 12
  - Hossein Rezazadeh, Iranian weightlifter
  - Jason Biggs, American actor
  - Aya Ishiguro, Japanese singer, writer, and fashion designer
  - Malin Åkerman, Swedish-Canadian actress
- May 13 – Barry Zito, American baseball player
- May 14 – Elisa Togut, Italian volleyball player
- May 15
  - Dwayne De Rosario, Canadian soccer player
  - Caroline Dhavernas, French-Canadian actress
  - Krzysztof Ignaczak, Polish volleyball player
- May 16 – Lionel Scaloni, Argentine football coach and former football player
- May 18
  - Ricardo Carvalho, Portuguese footballer
  - Cindy Parlow Cone, American soccer player
- May 19 – Marcus Bent, English footballer
- May 22
  - Katie Price (Jordan), English model and television personality
  - Ginnifer Goodwin, American actress
- May 25 – Adam Gontier, Canadian singer
- May 28
  - Jake Johnson, American actor and comedian
  - Tomohiko Ito, Japanese footballer
- May 29
  - Pelle Almqvist, Swedish singer-songwriter
  - Sébastien Grosjean, French tennis player
- May 30 – Lyoto Machida, Brazilian mixed martial artist
- May 31 – Sara Duterte, 15th Vice President of the Philippines

=== June ===
- June 1 – Antonietta Di Martino, Italian high-jumper
- June 2
  - Nikki Cox, American actress
  - Dominic Cooper, English actor
  - Justin Long, American actor
- June 4
  - Simone Maludrottu, Italian boxer
  - Scott Cawthon, video game developer, creator of the Five Nights at Freddy's franchise
- June 5 – Nick Kroll, American actor and comedian
- June 6
  - Konstantīns Konstantinovs, Latvian powerlifter (d. 2018)
  - Mariana Popova, Bulgarian singer
- June 7
  - Mini Andén, Swedish model
  - Bill Hader, American actor and comedian
- June 8
  - Maria Menounos, American actress, journalist, and television presenter
  - Eun Ji-won, South Korean rapper and singer
- June 9
  - Michaela Conlin, American actress
  - Miroslav Klose, German footballer
  - Matt Bellamy, British musician and singer
- June 10
  - Han Hee-won, South Korean golfer
  - Subhash Khot, Indian-American mathematician and computer scientist
  - DJ Qualls, American actor, producer, and model
  - Shane West, American actor
- June 11 – Joshua Jackson, Canadian actor
- June 13
  - Faizal Yusof, Malaysian actor (d. 2011)
  - Vishwananda, Hindu guru
- June 14 – Nikola Vujčić, Croatian basketball player and team manager of Maccabi Tel Aviv
- June 15 – Wilfred Bouma, Dutch footballer
- June 16 – Daniel Brühl, German actor
- June 19
  - Mía Maestro, Argentine actress
  - Dirk Nowitzki, German basketball player
  - Zoe Saldaña, American actress
- June 20 – Frank Lampard, English footballer
- June 21
  - Thomas Blondeau, Belgian writer (d. 2013)
  - Ignacio Corleto, Argentine rugby union player
  - Erica Durance, Canadian actress
  - Jean-Pascal Lacoste, French singer, actor and television host
- June 22
  - Diederik Boomsma, Dutch politician
  - Tim Driesen, Belgian actor
  - Dan Wheldon, English racing driver (d. 2011)
- June 23
  - Gladys Reyes, Filipino actress
  - Frédéric Leclercq, French musician
- June 24
  - Emppu Vuorinen, Finnish musician
  - Juan Román Riquelme, Argentine footballer
  - Shunsuke Nakamura, Japanese footballer
- June 25
  - Aramis Ramírez, Dominican baseball player
  - Aftab Shivdasani, Indian actor
- June 26
  - Daniel Constantin, Romanian politician
  - Cristian Lucchetti, Argentine footballer
- June 28 – Ha Ji-won, South Korean actress and singer
- June 29
  - Luke Kirby, Canadian actor
  - Nicole Scherzinger, American singer
  - Steve Savidan, French footballer

=== July ===
- July 1
  - Aleki Lutui, Tongan rugby player
  - Liu Kwok Man, Chinese footballer
  - Mark Hunter, British rower
- July 2
  - Ganesh, Indian actor and television presenter
  - Diana Gurtskaya, Georgian singer
  - Jüri Ratas, Estonian politician and 18th Prime Minister of Estonia
- July 3 – Mizuki Noguchi, Japanese long-distance runner
- July 4 – Becki Newton, American actress
- July 5 – Nandamuri Kalyan Ram, Indian actor and film producer
- July 6
  - Danil Khalimov, Kazakh Greco-Roman wrestler
  - Tia and Tamera Mowry, African-American actresses
- July 7
  - Chris Andersen, American basketball player
  - DJ Manian, German music producer and DJ
- July 8 – Erin Morgenstern, American artist and author
- July 9
  - Linda Park, Korean-born actress
  - Gulnara Samitova-Galkina, Russian middle-distance runner
- July 10
  - Ray Kay, Norwegian director and photographer
  - Jesse Lacey, American singer-songwriter
- July 11
  - Kim Kang-woo, South Korean actor
  - Mattias Gustafsson, Swedish handball player
- July 12
  - Topher Grace, American actor
  - Michelle Rodriguez, American actress
- July 16 – Ahmede Hussain, Bangladeshi writer
- July 17
  - Panda Bear, American musician
  - Justine Triet, French film director and screenwriter
- July 18
  - Shane Horgan, Irish rugby player
  - Virginia Raggi, Italian lawyer, politician
  - Joo Sang-wook, South Korean actor
  - Vladimir Tintor, Serbian film actor
- July 20
  - Pavel Datsyuk, Russian ice hockey player
  - Tamsyn Manou, Australian athlete
- July 21
  - Josh Hartnett, American actor
  - Kyoko Iwasaki, Japanese swimmer
- July 22
  - A. J. Cook, Canadian actress
  - Kyōko Hasegawa, Japanese model and actress
  - Dennis Rommedahl, Danish footballer
- July 23 – Stefanie Sun, Singapore singer
- July 25
  - Louise Brown, British citizen, first human born through in vitro fertilisation
  - Gerard Warren, American football player
  - Asma Lamnawar, Moroccan singer
- July 26
  - Jehad Muntasser, Libyan footballer
  - Eve Myles, Welsh actress
- July 28
  - Mine Tugay, Turkish actress
  - Hitomi Yaida, Japanese singer
- July 29 – Ayşe Hatun Önal, Turkish singer, actress, model and beauty pageant
- July 31
  - Abelardo de la Espriella, Colombian politician, President of Colombia (2026-present)
  - Nick Sorensen, American football player and sportscaster
- July – Caucher Birkar, born Fereydoun Derakhshani, Kurdish-born mathematician

=== August ===
- August 1 – Oliver Dowden, British politician
- August 3 – Mariusz Jop, Polish football player and coach
- August 4 – Kurt Busch, American race car driver
- August 5
  - Carolina Duer, Argentine boxer
  - Harel Levy, Israeli tennis player
- August 6 – Marisa Miller, American supermodel
- August 7
  - Alexandre Aja, French director
  - Vanness Wu, Taiwanese singer
- August 8
  - Natsuko Kuwatani, Japanese voice actress
  - Louis Saha, French footballer
- August 10 – Agus Harimurti Yudhoyono, Indonesian politician and former military officer
- August 11 – Leszek Laszkiewicz, Polish ice hockey player and executive
- August 15
  - Jennie Eisenhower, American actress
  - Kerri Walsh Jennings, American beach volleyball player
- August 17
  - Vibeke Stene, Norwegian rock singer
  - Jelena Karleuša, Serbian pop singer
- August 18 – Andy Samberg, American actor and comedian
- August 20 – Noah Bean, American actor
- August 21
  - Reuben Droughns, American football player
  - Alan Lee, Irish footballer
- August 22
  - Vitaliy Balytskyi, Ukrainian football player and manager (d. 2018)
  - James Corden, British comedian and television personality
- August 23 – Kobe Bryant, American basketball player (d. 2020)
- August 25 – Kel Mitchell, American actor, stand-up comedian, musician, singer, and rapper
- August 26 – Amanda Schull, American actress
- August 27 – Suranne Jones, English actress
- August 28
  - Pablo Echenique, Argentine born-Spanish politician
  - Kelly Overton, American actress
  - Sam Wills, New Zealand comic
- August 29 – Danielle Hampton, Canadian actress
- August 31
  - Ido Pariente, Israeli mixed martial artist
  - Jennifer Ramírez Rivero, Venezuelan model and businesswoman (d. 2018)

=== September ===
- September 1 – Manju Warrier, Indian actress
- September 2 – Tatiana Okupnik, Polish singer and composer
- September 3 – Tinkara Kovač, Slovenian singer and musician
- September 4
  - Wes Bentley, American actor
  - Frederik Veuchelen, Belgian cyclist
- September 5 – Chris Hipkins, New Zealand Prime Minister
- September 6
  - Mathew Horne, English actor
  - Homare Sawa, Japanese footballer
  - Peter van Huffel, Canadian jazz musician
- September 7 – Devon Sawa, Canadian actor
- September 9 – Gina Gogean, Romania artistic gymnast
- September 11
  - Ed Reed, American football player
  - Ben Lee, Australian singer
  - Yevgeny Popov, Russian politician and journalist
  - Else-Marthe Sørlie Lybekk, Norwegian handball player
  - Dejan Stanković, Serbian football player and coach
- September 12
  - Ruben Studdard, American singer
  - Ben McKenzie, American actor
- September 13 – Megan Henning, American actress
- September 14
  - Ben Cohen, English rugby union player
  - Ron DeSantis, American politician, 46th Governor of Florida
  - Carmen Kass, Estonian supermodel
- September 15 – Eiður Guðjohnsen, Icelandic football player
- September 16 – Stephanie Murphy, American politician
- September 18 – Billy Eichner, American actor and comedian
- September 19 – Mariano Puerta, Argentine tennis player
- September 20
  - Jason Bay, Canadian baseball player
  - Patrizio Buanne, Italian singer
  - Sarit Hadad, Israeli pop singer
- September 21
  - Doug Howlett, New Zealand rugby union player
  - Josh Thomson, American mixed martial artist
  - Alaine Laughton, Jamaican American singer
- September 22 – Harry Kewell, Australian footballer
- September 23
  - Anthony Mackie, American actor
  - Worm Miller, American screenwriter, director and actor
  - Keri Lynn Pratt, American actress
- September 24 – Wietse van Alten, Dutch archer
- September 25
  - Jodie Kidd, English model
  - Rossif Sutherland, Canadian actor
- September 27 – Ani Lorak, Ukrainian singer
- September 28
  - Dane Boedigheimer, American Internet personality
  - Pastora Soler, Spanish singer
- September 29 – Kurt Nilsen, Norwegian singer
- September 30
  - Candice Michelle, American professional wrestler and model
  - Daniel Grossberg, American politician

=== October ===
- October 1 – Katie Aselton, American actress
- October 2 – Ayumi Hamasaki, Japanese singer
- October 3
  - Jake Shears, American singer and songwriter
  - Claudio Pizarro, Peruvian footballer
  - Gerald Asamoah, German footballer
  - Christian Coulson, English actor
  - Shannyn Sossamon, American actress
- October 4
  - Dana Davis, American actress
  - Mark Day, Canadian actor
  - Phillip Glasser, American actor and producer
  - Kei Horie, Japanese actor
- October 5
  - Shane Ryan, Irish Gaelic footballer
  - James Valentine, American musician
- October 6 – Ricky Hatton, British professional boxer (d. 2025)
- October 9 – Nicky Byrne, Irish musician (Westlife)
- October 10
  - Caroline Evers-Swindell, New Zealand sailor
  - Georgina Evers-Swindell, New Zealand sailor
- October 14
  - Paul Hunter, English snooker player (d. 2006)
  - Usher, American singer and actor
- October 15 – Boško Balaban, Croatian footballer
- October 17
  - Isabel Díaz Ayuso, Spanish politician
  - Pablo Iglesias Turrión, Spanish politician
- October 20
  - Tomohiko Ito, Japanese anime director
  - Michael Johns, Australian singer (d. 2014)
  - Kira, German singer
  - Dionne Quan, American voice actress
  - Virender Sehwag, Indian cricketer
- October 21 – Joey Harrington, American football player
- October 24 – Carlos Edwards, Trinidadian footballer
- October 25
  - Russell Anderson, Scottish footballer
  - Zachary Knighton, American actor
  - David T. Little, American composer and drummer
- October 26 – CM Punk, American professional wrestler
- October 27
  - David Walton, American actor
  - Vanessa-Mae, Singaporean violinist
- October 28
  - Byron Donalds, American politician, Governor-elect of Florida
  - Marta Etura, Spanish actress
  - Justin Guarini, American singer
- October 29 – Travis Henry, American football player
- October 30 – Matthew Morrison, American actor and singer

=== November ===
- November 1
  - Jessica Valenti, American blogger and writer
  - Mary Kate Schellhardt, American actress
- November 4 – Shaun Berrigan, Australian rugby league player
- November 5
  - Bubba Watson, American golfer
  - Xavier Tondo, Spanish cyclist (d. 2011)
- November 6
  - Nicole Dubuc, American actress and writer
  - Taryn Manning, American actress
  - Sandrine Blancke, Belgian actress
- November 7
  - Mohamed Aboutrika, Egyptian footballer
  - Zaheer Khan, Indian cricketer
  - Mark Read, English singer (A1)
- November 8
  - Moses Michael Levi Barrow (born Jamal Michael Barrow), better known by his stage name Shyne, Belizean rapper and politician
  - Ali Karimi, Iranian football player
- November 9 – Sisqó, American actor and singer
- November 10
  - Nadine Angerer, German footballer
  - Kyla Cole, Czech model
  - Diplo, American DJ and music producer
  - Eve, African-American rapper
- Destra Garcia, female Trinidadian soca singer
- November 12 – Sharmeen Obaid-Chinoy, Pakistani journalist, activist and filmmaker
- November 13 – Hsu Wei Lun, Taiwanese actress (d. 2007)
- November 14
  - Bobby Allen, American ice hockey player
  - Xavier Nady, American baseball player
- November 16 – Santiago Peña, 52nd President of Paraguay
- November 17
  - Rachel McAdams, Canadian actress
  - Reggie Wayne, American football player
- November 18
  - Damien Johnson, Northern Irish footballer
  - Aldo Montano, Italian fencer
  - Ebru Özkan, Turkish actress
- November 19 – Mahé Drysdale, New Zealand rower
- November 22 – Karen O, American singer-songwriter and musician
- November 23 – Destin Daniel Cretton, American film director
- November 24 – Katherine Heigl, American actress
- November 25 – Shiina Ringo, Japanese singer and musician
- November 26 – Jun Fukuyama, Japanese voice actor
- November 27
  - Mike Skinner, English musician
  - Radek Štěpánek, Czech tennis player
- November 30
  - Clay Aiken, American singer-songwriter and author
  - Gael García Bernal, Mexican actor
  - Robert Kirkman, American comic book writer

=== December ===
- December 1
  - Stefan Kapičić, Serbian actor
  - Jen Psaki, American television political analyst and former government official
- December 2
  - Nelly Furtado, Portuguese-Canadian singer and songwriter
  - Alo Kõrve, Estonian actor
- December 4 – Lars Bystøl, Norwegian ski jumper
- December 5
  - Neil Druckmann, Israeli-American video game writer and programmer, founder of Naughty Dog
  - Olli Jokinen, Finnish ice hockey player
- December 7 – Shiri Appleby, American actress
- December 8 – Ian Somerhalder, American actor
- December 9 – Gastón Gaudio, Argentine tennis player
- December 10 – Summer Phoenix, American actress
- December 11 – Courtney Henggeler, American former actress
- December 12 – Monica Bîrlădeanu, Romanian actress
- December 14 – Patty Schnyder, Swiss tennis player
- December 16 – Veronica Schneider, Venezuelan actress and model
- December 17
  - Riteish Deshmukh, Indian actor, architect, producer and entrepreneur
  - Manny Pacquiao, Filipino boxer and politician
- December 18
  - Daniel Cleary, Canadian ice hockey player
  - Josh Dallas, American actor
  - Katie Holmes, American actress
- December 19 – Patrick Casey, American screenwriter and actor
- December 20
  - Geremi, Cameroon footballer
  - Jacqueline Saburido, Venezuelan-American social activist (d. 2019)
- December 21 – Shaun Morgan, South African musician and singer-songwriter
- December 22
  - Edo Maajka, Bosnian rapper
  - Emmanuel Olisadebe, Polish-Nigerian footballer
  - Joanne Kelly, Canadian actress
- December 23
  - Víctor Martínez, Venezuelan baseball player
  - Estella Warren, Canadian swimmer, model, and actress
- December 24 – Yıldıray Baştürk, Turkish footballer
- December 25
  - Paula Seling, Romanian singer and radio DJ
  - Jeremy Strong, American actor
  - Miyuki Takahashi, Japanese volleyball player
- December 26 – Kaoru Sugayama, Japanese volleyball player
- December 28
  - Feng Kun, Chinese volleyball player
  - John Legend, African-American singer-songwriter, pianist, and actor
- December 29
  - Alexis Amore, Peruvian actress, dancer, and model
  - Angelo Taylor, American athlete
- December 30
  - Tyrese Gibson, African-American singer, songwriter, rapper, actor, model, and screenwriter
  - Inferno, Polish musician
- December 31 – Yulia Barsukova, Russian rhythmic gymnast

== Nobel Prizes ==

- Physics – Pyotr Kapitsa, Arno Allan Penzias, Robert Woodrow Wilson
- Chemistry – Peter D. Mitchell
- Medicine – Werner Arber, Daniel Nathans, Hamilton O. Smith
- Literature – Isaac Bashevis Singer
- Peace – Anwar Sadat and Menachem Begin
- Economics – Herbert A. Simon
