= Aurelio Rodriguez (entrepreneur) =

American entrepreneur and nightclub founder

Aurelio F. Rodríguez
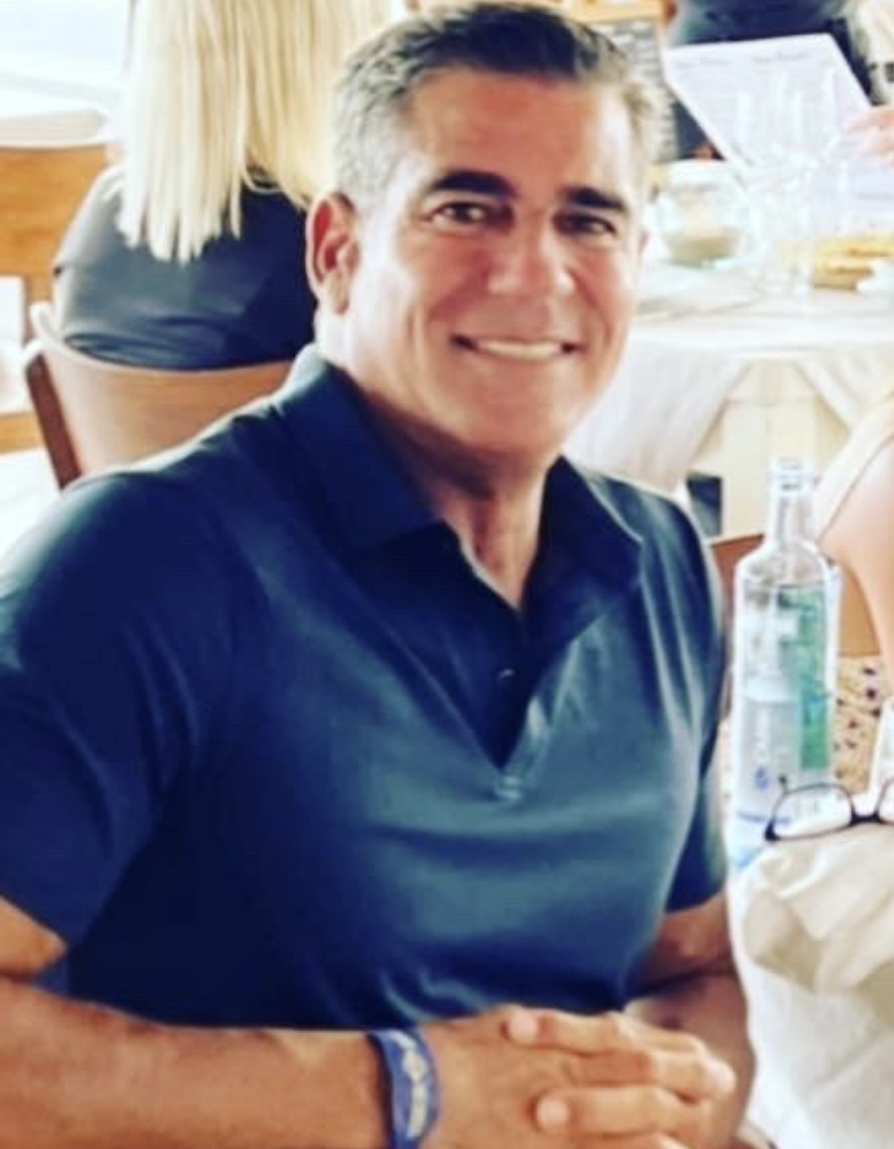
- Rodríguez in Ibiza, Spain, 2021
- Born: Miami, Florida, U.S.
- Education: University of Miami (BBA, International Finance)
- Occupations: Entrepreneur; marketing executive
- Years active: 1989–present
- Known for: Founding La Covacha

Aurelio F. Rodríguez is a Cuban-American entrepreneur and technology executive. He is the founder of La Covacha, a Miami nightclub he opened in 1989 that became a hub for Latin music and nightlife during the 1990s and 2000s, drawing patrons and artists from across Latin America and an emerging, bilingual Generation Ñ audience. Before his business career, Rodríguez worked as a fashion model, appearing in campaigns for Versace, Dolce & Gabbana, and Armani. Rodríguez later founded EmailBrain, an email marketing platform acquired by Dotster in 2008, and later worked at 8base, a low-code development platform.

== Early life and education ==
Rodríguez was born in Miami to parents who had emigrated from Cuba. His parents, Aurelio Rodríguez Sr. and Teresa Rodríguez, operated a truck stop on NW 25th Street in the Doral/Sweetwater area of Miami-Dade County. He graduated from the University of Miami with a Bachelor of Business Administration in International Finance.

== Modeling career ==
In the late 1980s and early 1990s, Rodríguez worked as a fashion model based in Miami. He was represented by the Irene Marie agency, where agent Richard Pullman was known for promoting Cuban male models in the industry. According to modeling agent Jason Kanner, Rodríguez "was one of the first Dolce & Gabbana guys that Steven Meisel shot when the brand was formed," with one such campaign running in L'Uomo Vogue in October 1991. He was also featured in the Versace Autumn-Winter 1989/90 campaign photographed by Bruce Weber.

Rodríguez appeared in a Miami fashion editorial in Rolling Stone in February 1991, and in campaigns for Armani, with a 1999 Newsweek cover story describing him as "a former Armani model." He also appeared in a promotional magazine for Request Jeans distributed with Details in 1992.

== La Covacha ==
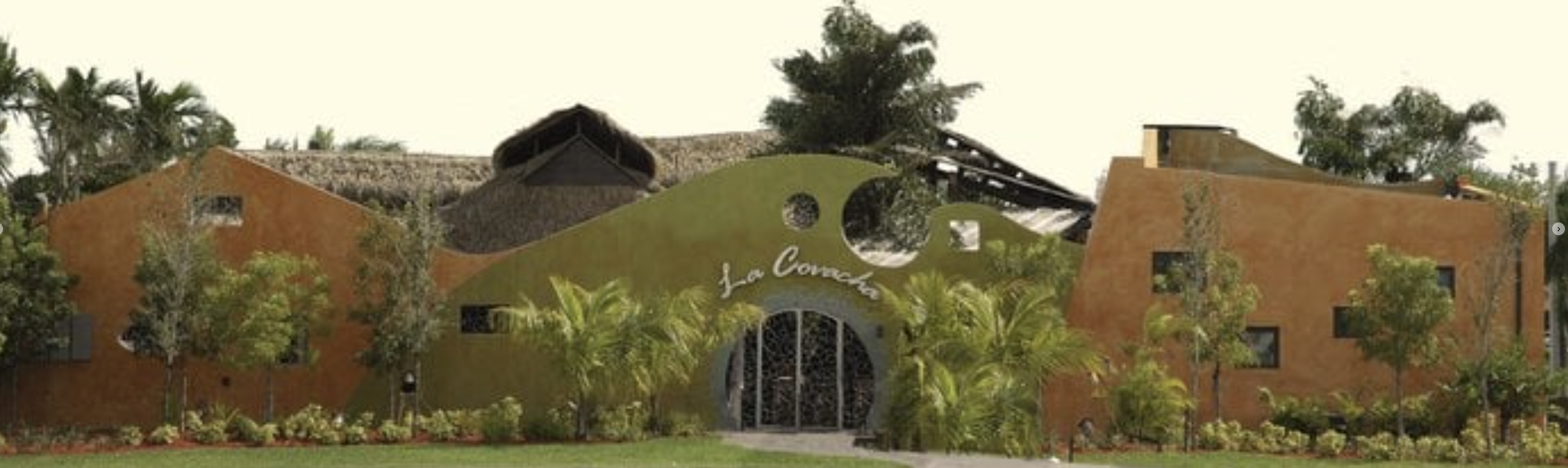
Exterior of La Covacha, 2015

In 1989, following his father's death, Rodríguez inherited the family truck stop and, together with his mother Teresa Rodríguez, converted it into a roadhouse-style bar and eventually a nightclub called La Covacha. The venue became a platform for Latin music in Miami during the 1990s and 2000s and was profiled in a 1995 Billboard feature on Miami's Latin club scene.

After a fire destroyed the venue in July 1995, Rodríguez rebuilt it together with architect William Lane later assisting in the redesign. In 2000, Rodríguez undertook a million-dollar renovation that added a kitchen and backyard stage while preserving the club's open-air layout. Programming covered a broad spectrum of Latin music, including salsa, merengue, vallenato, and Latin rock, and featured both local and international acts.

In 1999, Newsweek's "Generation Ñ" cover story by John Leland and Veronica Chambers identified La Covacha as a gathering place for young, bilingual, bicultural Latinos and one of the venues helping to define an emerging Cuban-American and pan-Latino cultural identity. A 2003 Miami Herald feature later described the club as "a center for the whole Latin world," noting that Rodríguez had broadened the club's programming beyond its original Cuban and tropical focus to serve Miami's growing Argentine, Colombian, and other Latin American communities. Miami New Times named La Covacha "Best Latin Club" four times: 1999, 2001, 2005, and 2015.

By the mid-2000s, Rodríguez's sister Teresa Klumpp had assumed day-to-day management. Rodríguez sold the business in 2014 after 25 years of operation; the venue continued under new ownership until August 2017, when it closed following controversy related to a dance competition video.

== Technology ventures ==
=== EmailBrain ===
In 2003, Rodríguez founded EmailBrain, a software-as-a-service email marketing platform based in Miami. The platform provided email campaign tools for small and medium-sized businesses. In July 2008, EmailBrain was acquired by Dotster, Inc., which was itself acquired by Endurance International Group in 2011.

=== Domain.com and Endurance International ===
Following the EmailBrain acquisition, Rodríguez continued at Dotster. In January 2010, he was named in an international business development role for the launch of Dominio.com, the Spanish-language brand of Dotster subsidiary Domain.com. Endurance International Group acquired Dotster in 2011. Endurance was a NASDAQ-listed provider of cloud-based platform solutions for small and medium-sized businesses, later acquired by Clearlake Capital and merged with Web.com in 2021 to form Newfold Digital.

=== 8base ===
Rodríguez served as Director of Business Operations at 8base, a Miami-based low-code development platform founded by Albert Santalo. The platform provides tools for building data models, APIs, and applications with minimal coding.
