= Oscar León =

Colombian boxer (born 1974)

Personal information
- Nickname: El Artista
- Nationality: Colombian
- Born: Oscar León Navas; April 4, 1974 (age 52) Cartagena, Colombia
- Height: 5 ft 7.5 in (1.71 m)
- Weight: Featherweight; Super lightweight

Boxing career
- Reach: 72 in (182 cm)
- Stance: Southpaw

Boxing record
- Total fights: 42
- Wins: 28
- Win by KO: 18
- Losses: 14

Oscar León Navas (born April 4, 1974) is a Colombian former professional boxer who competed from 1996 to 2011. He challenged for the WBA featherweight title in 2003, as the WBA and WBC interim featherweight titles in 2003 and 2006, respectively.

== Pro career ==
=== WBA Featherweight Championship ===
In 2003 Oscar lost two very disputed twelve round split-decisions to Derrick Gainer and Chris John for the WBA World Featherweight championship.

=== Interim WBC Featherweight Championship ===
On February 17, 2006, León was knocked out by Humberto Soto in the ninth round, for the WBC Featherweight championship.

== Professional boxing record ==
42 fights	28 wins	14 losses
By knockout	18	9
By decision	10	5

No.	Result	Record	Opponent	Type	Round, time	Date	Location	Notes
42	Loss	28–14	Francisco Fuentes	KO	4 (8), 1:29	19 Aug 2011	Coliseo Miguel "Happy" Lora, Montería, Colombia	
41	Loss	28–13	Pablo César Cano	SD	10	25 Jun 2010	Auditorio Plaza Condesa, Mexico City, Mexico	For vacant NABF super lightweight title
40	Loss	28–12	Vernon Paris	UD	6	27 Mar 2010	Joe Louis Arena, Detroit, Michigan, U.S.	
39	Loss	28–11	Ed Paredes	KO	4 (10), 0:51	4 Dec 2009	La Covacha, Miami, Florida, U.S.	
38	Loss	28–10	Danny García	TKO	3 (6), 2:59	22 Aug 2009	Toyota Center, Houston, Texas, U.S.	
