= Simone Maludrottu =

Italian boxer

Personal information
- Nickname: "Boom Boom"
- Nationality: Italian
- Born: Simone Maludrottu; 4 June 1978 (age 48) Olbia, Sardinia, Italy
- Weight: Bantamweight

Boxing career
- Stance: Orthodox

Boxing record
- Total fights: 33
- Wins: 30
- Win by KO: 11
- Losses: 3
- Draws: 0
- No contests: 0

Simone Maludrottu (born 4 June 1978) is a retired professional boxer from Olbia, Sardinia, Italy. Maludrottu fought in the Bantamweight division and is a former European (EBU) champion.

== Professional career ==
=== Debut ===
Maludrottu made his professional debut in July 2000, gaining a victory in Chivasso, Italy, with a points win over six rounds against Giovanni Delisi.

=== Initial title fights ===
Maludrottu fought thirteen fights, winning twelve, five by knockout, before he had a chance to fight for his first title belt in September 2003 when he challenged Emiliano Salvini for the `Vacant Italian Bantamweight Title in Olbia, Sassari, Italy. Maludrottu won this fight after Salvini retired in the seventh round due to an injury.

=== European title ===
In September 2004, after a further three victories Maludrottu challenged Frenchman Frederic Patrac for the European (EBU) Bantamweight Title which the Italian won on points over ten rounds.

=== World title challenge ===
Simone Maludrottu made an expedition to Japan and, on 10 January 2008, challenged Hozumi Hasegawa of the WBC world bantamweight class champion in Osaka prefectural gymnasium of Osaka-shi, Osaka of Japan. Maludrottu lost a 12 round unanimous decision to the Japanese champion.

== Damaen Kelly controversy ==
In April 2006, Damaen Kelly challenged Maludrottu at the Andersonstown Leisure Centre in Belfast, Northern Ireland. Kelly was attempting to become the first Irishman to capture the European (EBU) Bantamweight Title and the first Irish fighter to win the European title at two different weights.

Maludrottu was the naturally bigger man and carried more power having fought and Bantamweight for the majority of his career however Kelly possessed the faster hands and higher technical ability. Kelly's footwork and precise darting jabs frustrated Maludrottu as Kelly stayed out of his range leaving him unable to make his superior power pay. Despite this Maludrottu won an extremely controversial decision by a unanimous points decision. Punch stats showed that Kelly landed 155 punches while the Maludrottu landed only 87 and the vast majority of onlookers believed that Kelly had won a fairly comfortable decision, but the Sardinian was given the verdict by all three judges. Kelly's promoter Tommy Gilmour stated that "that was shameful. It was the biggest robbery I've seen in 35 years of boxing".

In the following rematch in Maludrottu's hometown of Olbia, on 25 November 2006, Maludrottu stopped Kelly inside three rounds after Kelly's trainer Mickey Hawkins threw in the towel. Kelly announced his retirement immediately after the fight stating "the time has come for me to walk away. The defeat on Saturday night just confirmed that to me. Every sportsman comes to a point when they know they are at that stage when it is time to go. I've had a great career with highs and lows and I've achieved an awful lot". This was to be Kelly's last fight although he was still the number one ranked Irish bantamweight boxer at the time.
