= Hozumi Hasegawa =

Japanese boxer

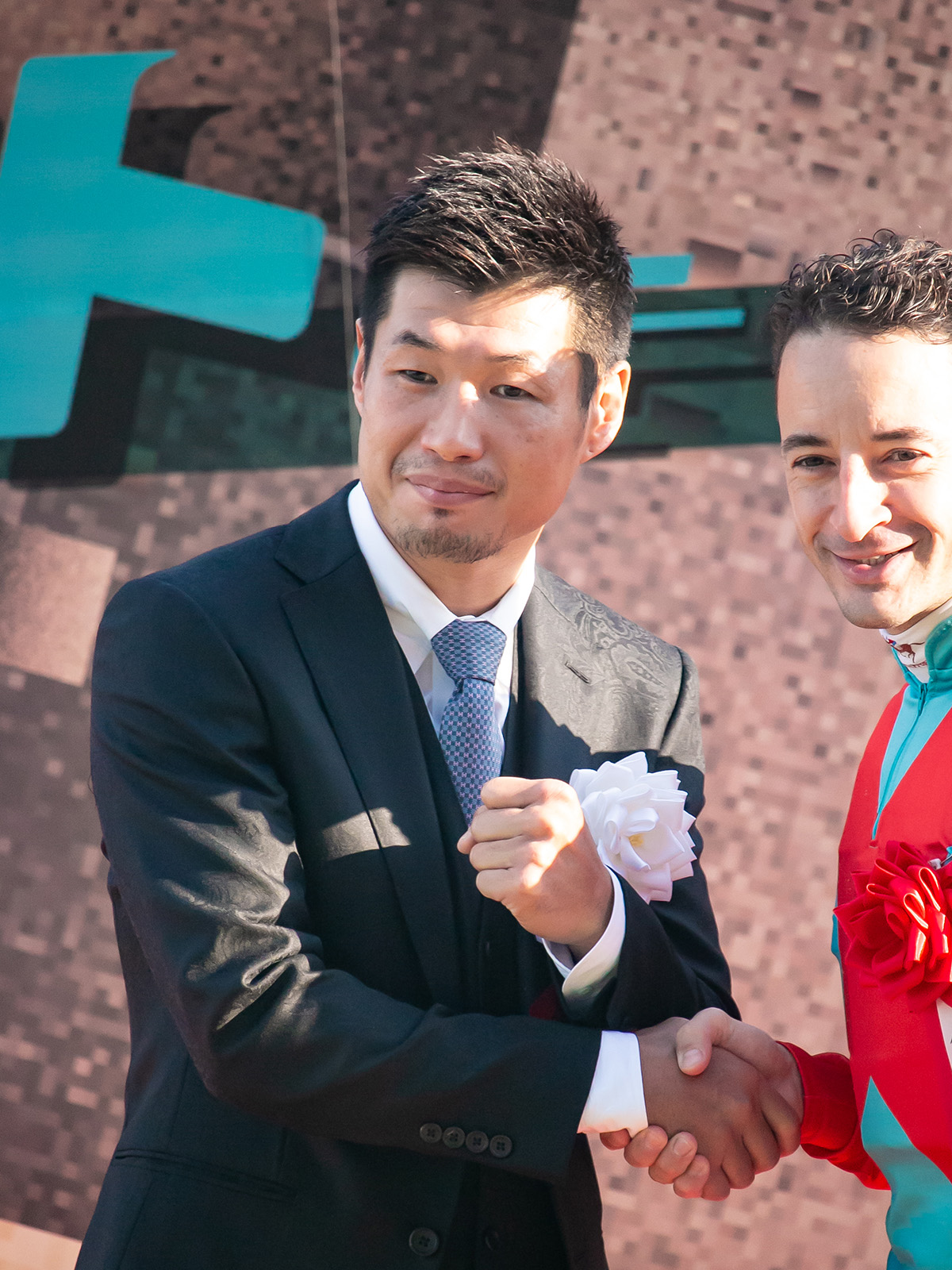
- Hasegawa in 2018

Personal information
- Born: 16 December 1980 (age 45) Nishiwaki, Hyōgo, Japan
- Height: 5 ft 6 in (168 cm)
- Weight: Bantamweight; Super bantamweight; Featherweight

Boxing career
- Reach: 67 1/2 in (171 cm)
- Stance: Southpaw

Boxing record
- Total fights: 41
- Wins: 36
- Win by KO: 16
- Losses: 5

Hozumi Hasegawa (長谷川 穂積, Hasegawa Hozumi; born 16 December 1980) is a Japanese former professional boxer who competed from 1999 to 2016. He won world titles in three weight classes, including the World Boxing Council (WBC) bantamweight title from 2005 to 2010, the WBC featherweight title from 2010 to 2011, and the WBC super bantamweight title in 2016. Hasegawa received MVP awards from the Japan Boxing Commission in 2005, 2006, 2008, and 2009 for his title defenses, and is the first Japanese boxer to have defended a bantamweight world title more than four times.

== Professional career ==
Born as the second of five children in Nishiwaki, Hyōgo, Hasegawa made his professional debut in 1999. Despite losing two four-round fights by decision early in his career, he defeated Jesse Maca by 12-round decision in 2003 to win the OPBF bantamweight title, which he defended three times before returning the belt on December 20, 2004.

=== Bantamweight ===
Hasegawa fought long-time champion Veeraphol Sahaprom on April 16, 2005, at Nippon Budokan. Sahaprom had defended the WBC bantamweight title against ten contenders over six years, and had not been defeated for almost a decade. Hasegawa fought effectively, leading the first four rounds, before Sahaprom fought back to win the middle rounds. Sahaprom tired in the later rounds, allowing Hasegawa to become more aggressive, shaking Sahaprom in round 10. The fight went to a decision, and the judges gave Hasegawa a 3–0 victory, ending Sahaprom's long reign over the bantamweight division.

Hasegawa made his first title defense on September 25, 2005, at Yokohama Arena. Hasegawa was originally scheduled to fight WBC top-ranked contender Diego Morales. However, Morales backed out of the fight due to an injury, and the eighth-ranked contender, Geraldo Martinez, was hastily called up as a substitute. Hasegawa had been sparring with southpaws in preparation to fight Morales, who was a southpaw, but the change to Martinez meant he would now be fighting an orthodox style fighter. Hasegawa took an early lead in the fight, knocking Martinez down twice in the 2nd round (ruled as slips by the referee), and once in the 3rd round. Hasegawa put Martinez down again early in the 7th with a dazzling left straight, and the fight erupted into a massive slugfest between the two fighters. Hasegawa knocked Martinez down two more times in the same round, prompting the referee to stop the fight. Hasegawa marked his first title defense with a TKO victory. This was also the day of his wedding anniversary.

On March 25, 2006, Hasegawa returned to fight in his hometown, Kobe, for the first time after becoming world champion. Hasegawa's opponent for his second title defense was again Veeraphol Sahaprom, who had compiled five consecutive wins to become the top-ranked WBC contender after losing his title to Hasegawa a year ago. It was rumored that Sahaprom had not been in top condition when he lost to Hasegawa, and many speculated that Sahaprom had not fought to the best of his ability in the previous fight. Both fighters started off slowly, but Hasegawa's shots gradually began to land on Sahaprom, and almost knocked out Sahaprom with a powerful left uppercut in the 6th. Sahaprom fought back in the 7th and 8th rounds, landing body shots, but Hasegawa landed a stunning right hook only ten seconds into the 9th round to knock out Sahaprom. Since Hasegawa suffered a left sternal fracture in June 2006, the scheduled defense on July 15 was postponed.

The third title defense took place on November 13, 2006, at Nippon Budokan, where Hasegawa first won the title. The challenger was Mexican fighter Genaro Garcia, ranked 1st in the WBC. Hasegawa knocked Garcia down with a left uppercut in the 4th round, but Garcia showed surprising resilience, landing powerful body shots in the middle rounds. Hasegawa suffered a light cut in the 7th round, which was worsened by a head-butt from Garcia in the 8th. Hasegawa managed to knock down Garcia again in the 8th, though his own face was covered with blood, and his eye was practically sealed shut from the cut. Hasegawa showed able defensive skills to ride out the 12th round, and won with a unanimous 3-0 decision. After the fight, Hasegawa was visited by WBC super-flyweight Champion Masamori Tokuyama, who gave Hasegawa a hand-written letter challenging him for his bantamweight title. If the fight with Tokuyama had taken place, it would have been a huge match-up between two Japan-based world champions, but Hasegawa declined the offer, wanting to fight non-Japanese challengers instead. Tokuyama retired shortly afterwards.

Hasegawa fought undefeated challenger Simpiwe Vetyeka of South Africa on May 3, 2007, for the fourth defense of his title. Very little was known about the challenger, Vetyeka, except that he had an undefeated record (16-0-0), and had defended the South African bantamweight title five times, winning four of those fights by knockout. He was also said to have compiled an exceptional career in the amateur ring. The fight itself was rather anticlimactic, as there had been huge excitement about the May 3 card, which featured two other world title match-ups. Both Hasegawa and Vetyeka wanted to land counter punches, leading to a great deal of inactivity from both sides. Neither fighter seemed willing to expose themselves, and few hard punches were thrown in the early rounds of the fight. The open scoring system was used in the fight, and Hasegawa was leading in the judges' scorecards going into the later rounds, but Vetyeka continued to lie back and wait for Hasegawa to attack. Hasegawa finally stepped up to decisively win the final two rounds, and won his fourth defense with a unanimous decision. There was some frustration after the fight, because both Hasegawa and Vetyeka complained that one of the advertisements in the middle of the ring was causing their feet to slip. This was the first world title defense where Hasegawa was unable to knock down his opponent in the fight.

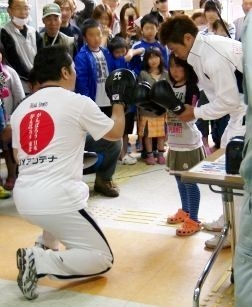
Hasegawa (on the right) with his trainer and manager Yamashita, during a visit to earthquake stricken Yamamoto, Miyagi, in May 2011. Their motto is "Where there is a will, there is a way". Hasegawa has sometimes uttered that belief. It is also the name of his autobiography, Ishi dōtaku (意志道拓), written in Japanese.

Hasegawa defended his title for the fifth time on January 10, 2008, with a 12-round unanimous decision victory against top-ranked WBC contender Simone Maludrottu. Hasegawa had transferred to the newly established Shinsei Boxing Gym in Kobe along with its founder and his trainer, Masato Yamashita, during the 8-month layoff since his last defense. Despite suffering a cut above his right eye early in the fight, Hasegawa dominated the fight to win by unanimous decision. This made him the first Japanese boxer to have defended a bantamweight world title over four times.

He defended it again for the sixth time, defeating Venezuela's Cristian Faccio with a second-round TKO on June 12, 2008.

Hasegawa fought on October 16, 2008, when he defended his title for the 7th time by taking on Mexican prospect Alejandro Valdez. Hasegawa won the fight by technical knockout in the second round.

His eighth title defense was a lot more impressive as he stopped Vusi Malinga in a single round on March 12, 2009.

He defended it again for the ninth time, defeating USA's Nestor Rocha with a first-round TKO on July 14, 2009.

He defended his title for the tenth time by knocking out Alvaro Perez on December 12, 2009.

==== End of title run ====
On April 30, 2010, Hasegawa challenged WBO 118-pound champion Fernando Montiel of Mexico. Although Montiel holds a title in the same division, it was not on the line because of JBC policy. At the bout, Hasegawa won the first three rounds, frustrating the Mexican visitor. In the fourth round Montiel landed an attack on Hasegawa, leaving the hometown fighter vulnerable for more blows. The referee declared an end and this was Hasegawa's first knockout loss. Aside from losing the match and the title, Hasegawa also suffered a shattered jaw. The injury was caused not by Montiel's barrage of attacks in the 4th round but by an impact Hasegawa took in the first round.

=== Featherweight ===
Following the bout with Montiel, Hasegawa went up two weight divisions and fight Juan Carlos Burgos for the vacant WBC featherweight crown on November 26, 2010 and won the WBC Featherweight Championship. Hasegawa was nominated as return of the year for the Best of 2010 awards by WBC, but was granted the most dramatic fight of the year for the match against Fernando Montiel, after all.

After being dethroned by Jhonny González in April 2011, Hasegawa hired a new trainer Frankie Liles in November 2011, in addition to his long-time trainer Yamashita, and has intensely trained with them.

Hasegawa was slated to make his return to the ring against the undefeated Mexican featherweight Carlos Felipe Felix on December 17, 2011. However, a broken right rib that he sustained during training caused the bout to be postponed until April 6, 2012. He stopped the opponent in the seventh round in that comeback appearance.

=== Super-bantamweight ===
In October 2012, it was announced that Hasegawa would move down a weight division to super-bantamweight in his next fight in December. He defeated Arturo Santos Reyes via a unanimous decision in Kobe on December 22, 2012. Hasegawa told that he had needed two years after winning the featherweight title to recapture his early style. He had suffered from lack of motivation to continue fighting during the two years after the death of his dearest mother and the tragedy of the aftermath of the 2011 Tōhoku earthquake and tsunami that struck Japan.

Hasegawa faced Genaro Camargo in a bout in Tokyo on August 12, 2013. He won by TKO in the first round.

Hasegawa fought for the IBF super-bantamweight title against reigning champion Kiko Martinez on April 23, 2014 in Osaka. In what many thought to be the last fight in the colorful career of Hasegawa, a back and forth contest erupted, with the Spaniard's one punch knockout power being the deciding factor as he urged a referee stoppage in 7th round following a brutal attack on his Japanese foe.

Following the Martinez bout, there were calls by many for Hasegawa to retire, as it seemed he was no longer the fighter he once was. However, Hasegawa returned to the ring on May 9, 2015 in Kobe against undefeated Mexican Horacio Garcia. He won the fight comfortably via UD over 10 rounds.

On September 15, 2016, Hasegawa defeated Hugo Ruiz by technical knockout to become WBC super-bantamweight champion. Later that year, on December 9, Hasegawa announced his retirement from boxing.

== Professional boxing record ==
41 fights	36 wins	5 losses
By knockout	16	3
By decision	20	2

No.	Result	Record	Opponent	Type	Round, time	Date	Location	Notes
41	Win	36–5	Hugo Ruiz	RTD	9 (12), 3:00	2016-09-16	Edion Arena, Osaka, Japan	Won WBC super bantamweight title
40	Win	35–5	Carlos Ruiz	UD	10	2015-12-11	Central Gymnasium, Kobe, Japan	
39	Win	34–5	Horacio Garcia	UD	10	2015-05-09	Central Gymnasium, Kobe, Japan	
38	Loss	33–5	Kiko Martínez	TKO	7 (12), 1:20	2014-04-23	Osaka-jō Hall, Osaka, Japan	For IBF super bantamweight title
37	Win	33–4	Genaro Camargo	TKO	1 (10), 2:32	2013-08-12	Ota City General Gymnasium, Tokyo, Japan	
36	Win	32–4	Veerapol Sor Chantasith	KO	3 (10), 2:51	2013-04-26	Central Gymnasium, Kobe, Japan	
35	Win	31–4	Arturo Santos Reyes	UD	10	2012-12-22	Central Gymnasium, Kobe, Japan	
34	Win	30–4	Felipe Carlos Felix	TKO	7 (10), 2:28	2012-04-06	International Forum, Tokyo, Japan	
33	Loss	29–4	Jhonny González	TKO	4 (12), 0:58	2011-04-08	World Memorial Hall, Kobe, Japan	Lost WBC featherweight title
32	Win	29–3	Juan Carlos Burgos	UD	12	2010-11-26	Nippon Gaishi Hall, Nagoya, Japan	Won vacant WBC featherweight title
31	Loss	28–3	Fernando Montiel	TKO	4 (12), 2:59	2010-04-30	Nippon Budokan, Tokyo, Japan	Lost WBC bantamweight title
30	Win	28–2	Alvaro Perez	TKO	4 (12), 2:38	2009-12-18	World Memorial Hall, Kobe, Japan	Retained WBC bantamweight title
29	Win	27–2	Nestor Rocha	TKO	1 (12), 2:28	2009-07-14	World Memorial Hall, Kobe, Japan	Retained WBC bantamweight title
28	Win	26–2	Vusi Malinga	TKO	1 (12), 2:37	2009-03-12	World Memorial Hall, Kobe, Japan	Retained WBC bantamweight title
27	Win	25–2	Alejandro Valdez	TKO	2 (12), 2:41	2008-10-16	Yoyogi National Gymnasium, Tokyo, Japan	Retained WBC bantamweight title
26	Win	24–2	Cristian Faccio	TKO	2 (12), 2:18	2008-06-12	Nippon Budokan, Tokyo, Japan	Retained WBC bantamweight title
25	Win	23–2	Simone Maludrottu	UD	12	2008-01-10	Prefectural Gymnasium, Osaka, Japan	Retained WBC bantamweight title
24	Win	22–2	Simpiwe Vetyeka	UD	12	2007-05-03	Ariake Coliseum, Tokyo, Japan	Retained WBC bantamweight title
23	Win	21–2	Genaro Garcia	UD	12	2006-11-13	Nippon Budokan, Tokyo, Japan	Retained WBC bantamweight title
22	Win	20–2	Veeraphol Sahaprom	TKO	9 (12), 0:19	2006-03-25	World Memorial Hall, Kobe, Japan	Retained WBC bantamweight title
21	Win	19–2	Gerardo Martinez	TKO	7 (12), 2:18	2005-09-25	Yokohama Arena, Yokohama, Japan	Retained WBC bantamweight title
20	Win	18–2	Veeraphol Sahaprom	UD	12	2005-04-16	Nippon Budokan, Tokyo, Japan	Won WBC bantamweight title
19	Win	17–2	Jun Toriumi	UD	10	2004-10-30	Ryōgoku Kokugikan, Tokyo, Japan	
18	Win	16–2	Norasing Kietprasanchai	UD	12	2004-05-23	Sambo Hall, Kobe, Japan	Retained OPBF bantamweight title
17	Win	15–2	Dechsayarm Sithpordam	UD	10	2004-02-15	Municipal Central Gymnasium, Osaka, Japan	
16	Win	14–2	Alvin Felicilda	TKO	10 (12), 1:20	2003-11-09	Sambo Hall, Kobe, Japan	Retained OPBF bantamweight title
15	Win	13–2	Sunao Uno	SD	12	2003-07-20	Industrial Hall, Gifu, Japan	Retained OPBF bantamweight title
14	Win	12–2	Jess Maca	SD	12	2003-05-18	Sambo Hall, Kobe, Japan	Won OPBF bantamweight title
13	Win	11–2	Naphdetsh Soonkilanoynai	UD	10	2003-03-02	Sangyo Koryu Center, Akashi, Japan	
12	Win	10–2	Ryuichi Minoriyama	UD	10	2002-10-27	Sambo Hall, Kobe, Japan	
11	Win	9–2	Toshinobu Nakatani	UD	10	2002-08-24	Prefectural Gymnasium, Osaka, Japan	
10	Win	8–2	Pornchai Sithpraprom	TKO	6 (10), 0:50	2002-04-21	Sambo Hall, Kobe, Japan	
9	Win	7–2	Gamwonwan Sithsobha	KO	2 (8), 1:16	2002-02-03	Azalea Taishō, Osaka, Japan	
8	Win	6–2	Hisami Kitahara	UD	6	2001-10-21	Sambo Hall, Kobe, Japan	
7	Win	5–2	Takashi Taketazu	UD	6	2001-08-17	Archaic Hall, Amagasaki, Japan	
6	Win	4–2	Yoshihiro Yoshioka	KO	1 (4), 2:13	2001-07-07	Azalea Taishō, Osaka, Japan	
5	Loss	3–2	Masamitsu Arakawa	SD	4	2001-05-20	Sambo Hall, Kobe, Japan	
4	Win	3–1	Yoshinori Terada	UD	4	2001-01-28	City Sogo Gym, Takasago, Japan	
3	Loss	2–1	Takashi Taketazu	UD	4	2000-07-30	Tomioka Sports School, Osaka, Japan	
2	Win	2–0	Hideki Ishizuka	TKO	2 (4), 1:59	2000-04-28	Chicken George, Kobe, Japan	
1	Win	1–0	Shuichi Kuroiwa	UD	4	1999-11-22	Chicken George, Kobe, Japan	

== Titles in boxing ==
=== Major world titles ===
- WBC bantamweight champion (118 lbs)
- WBC super bantamweight champion (122 lbs)
- WBC featherweight champion (126 lbs)

=== Regional/International titles ===
- OPBF bantamweight champion (118 lbs)

== See also ==
- List of boxing triple champions
- List of WBC world champions
- List of Japanese boxing world champions
- Boxing in Japan

Sporting positions
Regional boxing titles
Preceded by Jess Maca	OPBF bantamweight champion 18 May 2003 – October 2004	Vacant Title next held by Jun Toriumi
World boxing titles
Preceded by Veeraphol Sahaprom	WBC bantamweight champion 16 April 2005 – 30 April 2010	Succeeded by Fernando Montiel
Vacant Title last held by Elio Rojas	WBC featherweight champion 26 November 2010 – 8 April 2011	Succeeded by Jhonny González
Preceded by Hugo Ruiz	WBC super bantamweight champion 16 September 2016 – 9 December 2016; Vacated	Vacant Title next held by Rey Vargas
