= Pavel Malikov =

Russian boxer (born 1986)

Pavel Malikov Павел Маликов
Personal information
- Nationality: Russian
- Born: 28 February 1986 (age 40) Moscow, Russian SFSR, Soviet Union
- Height: 5 ft 6 in (168 cm)
- Weight: Lightweight

Boxing career
- Stance: Orthodox

Boxing record
- Total fights: 24
- Wins: 16
- Win by KO: 6
- Losses: 7
- Draws: 1

Pavel Mikhailovich Malikov (Russian: Павел Михайлович Маликов; born 26 February 1986) is a Russian professional boxer who held the WBA Asia, WBC-ABC, and WBO Inter-Continental lightweight titles between 2016 and 2018.

== Career ==
On 9 July 2017, Pavel Malikov faced Japanese veteran Daiki Kaneko. He defeated Kaneko by split decision to retain the WBA Asia lightweight title.

On 15 December, Malikov defended his WBA Asia title against Colombian boxer Deiner Berrio for the vacant WBO interim Inter-Continental title. He defeated Berrio by split decision in a competitive fight to add the WBO interim title to his collection.

On 22 April 2018, Malikov defended the full WBO Inter-Continental title against Daud Yordan in a WBA world title eliminator. In what is an upset performance, Yordan defeated Malikov by knockout in the eighth round.

== Professional boxing record ==
24 fights	16 wins	7 losses
By knockout	6	6
By decision	10	1
Draws	1	

No.	Result	Record	Opponent	Type	Round, time	Date	Location	Notes
24	Loss	16–7–1	(Russia) Petr Vasilev	TKO	2 (8), 0:54	16 Sep 2022	Moscow State Circus, Moscow, Russia	
23	Loss	16–6–1	(Russia) Nikita Kuznetsov	TKO	5 (8), 2:49	9 Jun 2022	Gazgolder Club, Moscow, Russia	
22	Loss	16–5–1	(Uzbekistan) Khurshid Tojibaev	TD	4 (8), 2:33	11 Dec 2021	CSKA Sport complex, Almaty, Kazakhstan	
21	Loss	16–4–1	(Kazakhstan) Stanislav Kalitskiy	KO	5 (8), 1:00	27 Mar 2021	RCC Boxing Academy, Yekaterinburg, Russia	
20	Loss	16–3–1	(Russia) Roman Andreev	TKO	2 (10), 2:05	7 Nov 2020	RCC Boxing Academy, Yekaterinburg, Russia	
19	Loss	16–2–1	(Russia) Zaur Abdullaev	KO	7 (10), 1:24	22 Aug 2020	RCC Boxing Academy, Yekaterinburg, Russia	
18	Win	16–1–1	(Russia) Isa Chaniev	MD	12	12 Oct 2019	Arēna Rīga, Rīga, Latvia	Retained EBP lightweight title
17	Win	15–1–1	(Russia) Gaybatulla Gadzhialiev	SD	10	20 Apr 2019	Floyd Mayweather Boxing Academy, Moscow, Russia	Retained EBP lightweight title
16	Draw	14–1–1	(Russia) Vage Sarukhanyan	SD	10	9 Feb 2019	Galaktika Culture Centre, Estosadok, Russia	Retained EBP lightweight title
15	Win	14–1	(Philippines) Ernie Sanchez	KO	2 (10), 1:58	27 Oct 2018	Triumph, Lyubertsy, Russia	Won vacant EBP lightweight title
14	Loss	13–1	(Indonesia) Daud Yordan	KO	8 (12), 1:54	22 Apr 2018	DIVS, Yekaterinburg, Russia	For WBO Inter-Continental lightweight title
13	Win	13–0	(Colombia) Deiner Berrio	SD	10	15 Dec 2017	DIVS, Yekaterinburg, Russia	Retained WBA Asia lightweight title; Won WBO interim Inter-Continental lightweight title
12	Win	12–0	(Japan) Daiki Kaneko	SD	10	9 Jul 2017	DIVS, Yekaterinburg, Russia	Retained WBA Asia lightweight title
11	Win	11–0	(Kazakhstan) Mirzhan Zhaxylykov	TKO	2 (10), 2:57	25 Mar 2017	PNTZ Palace of Culture, Pervouralsk, Russia	Won vacant WBA Asia lightweight title
10	Win	10–0	(Philippines) Adones Aguelo	TKO	4 (10), 2:56	17 Dec 2016	Yekaterinburg Expo, Yekaterinburg, Russia	Won vacant WBC-ABC lightweight title
9	Win	9–0	(Philippines) Carlo Magali	RTD	8 (10), 3:00	18 Nov 2016	DIVS, Yekaterinburg, Russia	Retained WBC-ABC Silver lightweight title
8	Win	8–0	(Philippines) Leonardo Doronio	TKO	3 (12), 2:52	11 Jul 2016	DIVS, Yekaterinburg, Russia	Won vacant WBC-ABC Silver lightweight title
7	Win	7–0	(Russia) Nikolay Buzolin	SD	10	22 Feb 2016	Iceberg Sports Palace, Adler, Russia	Won vacant Russian lightweight title
6	Win	6–0	(Uzbekistan) Sherzodbek Mamajonov	UD	6	21 Nov 2015	KRC Arbat, Moscow, Russia	
5	Win	5–0	(Tajikistan) Firdavs Azimjonov	UD	4	22 Jun 2015	Boxing & Gym Academy, Moscow, Russia	
4	Win	4–0	(Russia) Bayram Mukhamedov	UD	6	16 Oct 2010	Olimpiysky Sport Palace, Chekhov, Russia	
3	Win	3–0	(Moldova) Andrei Semencenco	TKO	2 (6), 2:01	25 Sep 2010	Ice Palace, Murmansk, Russia	
2	Win	2–0	(Uzbekistan) Hujabek Mamatov	UD	4	13 Jun 2010	Yunost, Klimovsk, Russia	
1	Win	1–0	(Russia) Ruslan Berchuk	UD	4	23 May 2010	Red Square, Moscow, Russia	
