= Simpiwe Vetyeka =

South African boxer

Personal information
- Nickname: V12
- Born: Simpiwe Vetyeka; 24 December 1980 (age 45) Mdantsane, South Africa
- Height: 170 cm (5 ft 7 in)
- Weight: Bantamweight; Super bantamweight; Featherweight; Lightweight

Boxing career
- Reach: 171 cm (67 in)
- Stance: Orthodox

Boxing record
- Total fights: 34
- Wins: 30
- Win by KO: 18
- Losses: 4

Simpiwe Vetyeka (born 24 December 1980) is a South African professional boxer. He is a former WBA (Undisputed) and IBO featherweight champion, as well as a former IBO super bantamweight champion.

Vetyeka's career came to an end after he broke both his legs in a car accident in 2018.

== Professional career ==
=== Vetyeka vs. John ===
Vetyeka won the WBA Super World featherweight title by defeating Chris John on 6 December 2013, when John retired on his stool after the sixth of twelve rounds. Vetyeka's IBO featherweight title was also on the line. It was John's first professional loss and brought his ten-year WBA title reign to an end, sending him into retirement.

=== Vetyeka vs. Donaire ===
Vetyeka fought Filipino Nonito Donaire for the WBA (Super) featherweight title on 31 May 2014 at The Venetian Macao Hotel & Resort's Cotai Arena in Macau of the Special administrative regions in China. Vetyeka was dropped by Donaire in the fourth round after landing his signature left hook. The fight was stopped seconds after the bell for the fifth round rang due to a cut on Donaire's left eye from an accidental headbutt. Vetyeka lost the bout via unanimous technical decision.

=== Vetyeka vs. Reyes ===
On 12 December 2014, Vetyeka faced Arturo Santos Reyes. Vetyeka won the fight via unanimous decision, with the judges scoring it 120–108, 119-111 and 118–112 in favor of Vetyeka.

=== Vetyeka vs. Puente ===
On 28 November 2015, Vetyeka fought and defeated Rodolfo Puente via a fourth-round KO.

=== Vetyeka vs. Tameda ===
On 22 April 2016, Vetyeka fought Tsuyoshi Tameda. Vetyeka won the fight via unanimous decision.

== Professional boxing record ==
| 34 fights | 30 wins | 4 losses |
|---|---|---|
| By knockout | 18 | 0 |
| By decision | 12 | 4 |

| No. | Result | Record | Opponent | Type | Round, time | Date | Location | Notes |
|---|---|---|---|---|---|---|---|---|
| 34 | Win | 30–4 | Thompson Mokwana | KO | 8 (12), 2:21 | 6 Apr 2018 | Orient Theatre, East London, South Africa | Won vacant WBO Africa lightweight title |
| 33 | Loss | 29–4 | Lerato Dlamini | MD | 10 | 21 Oct 2017 | Emperors Palace, Kempton Park, Gauteng, South Africa | |
| 32 | Win | 29–3 | Tsuyoshi Tameda | UD | 10 | 22 Apr 2016 | Orient Theatre, East London, South Africa | |
| 31 | Win | 28–3 | Rodolfo Puente | KO | 4 (12) | 28 Nov 2015 | Selbourne Park, East London, South Africa | Retained WBA International featherweight title |
| 30 | Win | 27–3 | Arturo Santos Reyes | UD | 12 | 12 Dec 2014 | Orient Theatre, East London, South Africa | Won vacant WBA International featherweight title |
| 29 | Loss | 26–3 | Nonito Donaire | TD | 5 (12), 0:01 | 31 May 2014 | Cotai Arena, Macao | Lost WBA (Undisputed) featherweight title |
| 28 | Win | 26–2 | Chris John | RTD | 6 (12), 3:00 | 6 Dec 2013 | Metro City, Northbridge, Western Australia, Australia | Retained IBO featherweight title; Won WBA (Undisputed) featherweight title |
| 27 | Win | 25–2 | Daud Yordan | TKO | 12 (12), 2:12 | 14 Apr 2013 | Indoor Tennis Stadium, Jakarta, Indonesia | Won IBO featherweight title |
| 26 | Win | 24–2 | Sibusiso Khumalo | KO | 4 (10) | 14 Dec 2012 | Mdantsane Indoor Centre, Mdantsane, Eastern Cape, South Africa | |
| 25 | Loss | 23–2 | Klaas Mboyane | SD | 8 | 4 Jun 2012 | Sandton Convention Centre, Sandton, Gauteng, South Africa | |
| 24 | Win | 23–1 | Giovanni Caro | UD | 12 | 2 Jul 2011 | Plaza de Toros Fermin Rivera, San Luis Potosi, Mexico | Won WBC International super-bantamweight title |
| 23 | Win | 22–1 | Roberto Carlos Leyva | KO | 3 (6), 2:32 | 25 Feb 2011 | Million Dollar Elm Casino, Tulsa, Oklahoma, U.S. | |
| 22 | Win | 21–1 | Eric Barcelona | UD | 12 | 11 Jul 2009 | Emperors Palace, Kempton Park, Gautent, South Africa | Won IBO bantamweight title |
| 21 | Win | 20–1 | Nkosinathi Tshinavhe | TKO | 8 (12), 2:26 | 16 Aug 2008 | Emperors Palace, Kempton Park, Gauteng, South Africa | Retained South African bantamweight title |
| 20 | Win | 19–1 | Nkqubela Gwazela | UD | 12 | 12 Apr 2008 | North-West University Sports Complex, Mafikeng, North-West, South Africa | Retained South African bantamweight title |
| 19 | Win | 18–1 | Lubabalo Msuthu | TKO | 8 (12), 1:22 | 14 Dec 2007 | Nasrec Indoor Arena, Johannesburg, Gauteng, South Africa | Retained South African bantamweight title |
| 18 | Win | 17–1 | Ebenezer Tumane | TKO | 2 (12), 0:46 | 31 Aug 2007 | James Motlatsi Hall, Klerksdorp, North-West, South Africa | Retained South African bantamweight title |
| 17 | Loss | 16–1 | Hozumi Hasegawa | UD | 12 | 3 May 2007 | Ariake Coliseum, Kōtō, Tokyo, Japan | For WBC bantamweight title |
| 16 | Win | 16–0 | Sakhumzi Bongwana | TKO | 4 (12), 0:46 | 9 Dec 2006 | Mdantsane Indoor Centre, Mdantsane, East London, South Africa | Retained South African bantamweight title |
| 15 | Win | 15–0 | Siyabonga Nyanga | UD | 12 | 7 Jul 2006 | Orient Theatre, East London, South Africa | Retained South African bantamweight title |
| 14 | Win | 14–0 | Wendy Mackenzie | TKO | 8 (12), 1:46 | 2 Dec 2005 | Orient Theatre, East London, South Africa | Retained South African bantamweight title |
| 13 | Win | 13–0 | Sakhumzi Bongwana | TKO | 7 (12), 2:35 | 5 Aug 2005 | Orient Theatre, East London, South Africa | Retained South African bantamweight title |
| 12 | Win | 12–0 | Luthando Maqolo | TKO | 7 (12), 2:02 | 6 May 2005 | Centenary Hall, New Brighton, Port Elizabeth | Retained South African bantamweight title |
| 11 | Win | 11–0 | Khulile Makeba | UD | 12 | 4 Feb 2005 | Graceland Hotel Casino, Secunda, South Africa | Won South African bantamweight title |
| 10 | Win | 10–0 | Mzimkhulu Funde | PTS | 6 | 23 Oct 2004 | Orient Theatre, East London, South Africa | |
| 9 | Win | 9–0 | Bonile Ngcingane | PTS | 6 | 31 Jul 2004 | Orient Theatre, East London, South Africa | |
| 8 | Win | 8–0 | Zilindile Kafatyi | PTS | 6 | 21 Feb 2004 | Orient Theatre, East London, South Africa | |
| 7 | Win | 7–0 | Siyabulela Ziqula | PTS | 8 | 6 Dec 2003 | Orient Theatre, East London, South Africa | |
| 6 | Win | 6–0 | Mlungiseleli Jambela | KO | 2 (6) | 5 Apr 2003 | Orient Theatre, East London, South Africa | |
| 5 | Win | 5–0 | Phillip Stelle | KO | 2 (4) | 14 Dec 2002 | Mdantsane Indoor Centre, Mdantsane, East London, South Africa | |
| 4 | Win | 4–0 | Yongama Jezile | TKO | 3 (4) | 30 Nov 2002 | Transkei University Atlanta Hall, Mthatha, South Africa | |
| 3 | Win | 3–0 | Sithembile Mangweni | KO | 3 (4) | 18 Aug 2002 | Mdantsane Indoor Centre, Mdantsane, East London, South Africa | |
| 2 | Win | 2–0 | Msitheli Gxalathana | TKO | 4 (4) | 24 Mar 2002 | Mdantsane Indoor Centre, Mdantsane, East London, South Africa | |
| 1 | Win | 1–0 | Lundi Mbozi | PTS | 4 | 11 Jan 2002 | Orient Theatre, East London, South Africa | |

== See also ==
- List of featherweight boxing champions

Sporting positions
Minor world boxing titles
| Vacant Title last held by Silence Mabuza | IBO bantamweight champion 11 July 2009 - 2010; Vacated | Vacant Title next held by Vic Darchinyan |
| Preceded by Daud Yordan | IBO featherweight champion 14 April 2013 - 2014; Vacated | Vacant Title next held by Lusanda Komanisi |
Major world boxing titles
| Preceded by Chris John | WBA featherweight champion Undisputed title 6 December 2013 – 31 May 2014 | Succeeded by Nonito Donaire |
