= Arturo Santos Reyes =

Mexican boxer (born 1985)

Personal information
- Full name: José Arturo Santos Reyes
- Nationality: Mexico
- Born: 28 December 1985 (age 40) Nuevo Laredo, Tamaulipas
- Height: 1.63 m (5 ft 4 in)
- Weight: 57 kg (126 lb)

Sport
- Sport: Boxing
- Weight class: Featherweight
Medal record
Central American and Caribbean Games
Silver medal – second place	2006 Cartagena	Bantamweight

José Arturo Santos Reyes (born 28 December 1985) is a Mexican professional boxer. As an amateur, he won a silver medal at the 2004 Junior World Championships at flyweight and later competed at the 2008 Summer Olympics at featherweight.

== Amateur career ==
At the 2004 Junior World Championships, he beat Mongolia's Zorigtbaataryn Enkhzorig but lost the 2004 final to Ilhom Rahimov from Uzbekistan.

At the 2006 Central American and Caribbean Games, he won silver at bantamweight beating Venezuela's Héctor Manzanilla but losing to Cuba's Guillermo Rigondeaux.

At the 2007 World Championships he reached the quarterfinal where he lost to Ukraine's Vasyl Lomachenko but qualified for Beijing.

He is participating in the Beijing 2008 Olympics where he beat Nick Okoth and Alaa Shili to reach the quarter finals.

== Professional boxing record ==
29 fights	19 wins	10 losses
By knockout	5	0
By decision	14	10

No.	Result	Record	Opponent	Type	Round, time	Date	Location	Notes
29	Loss	19–10	Matt Conway	SD	10	Jun 8, 2018	Rivers Casino, Pittsburgh, Pennsylvania, U.S.	
28	Loss	19–9	Sharif Bogere	UD	10	Jan 27, 2018	Sam's Town Hotel and Gambling Hall, Sunrise Manor, Nevada, U.S.	
27	Loss	19–8	Tevin Farmer	UD	10	Apr 29, 2017	Liacouras Center, Philadelphia, Pennsylvania, U.S.	
26	Loss	19–7	Alfredo Santiago	UD	10	Mar 25, 2017	Parque Concepcion Perez Alberto, Fajardo, Puerto Rico	For vacant WBA Fedelatin super featherweight title
25	Win	19–6	Diego Vázquez	UD	10	Dec 23, 2016	Palenque de Gallos, Comitán, Mexico	
24	Loss	18–6	Alberto Guevara	SD	10	Dec 5, 2015	Polideportivo Centenario, Los Mochis, Mexico	
23	Loss	18–5	Abner Mares	UD	10	Mar 7, 2015	MGM Grand Garden Arena, Paradise, Nevada, U.S.	
22	Loss	18–4	Simpiwe Vetyeka	UD	12	Dec 12, 2014	Orient Theatre, East London, South Africa	
21	Win	18–3	Jairo Ochoa Martínez	UD	10	Jul 19, 2014	Centro de Convenciones Azul, Ixtapa-Zihuatanejo, Mexico	
20	Win	17–3	Julio César Miranda	SD	10	Mar 29, 2014	Arena Monterrey, Monterrey, Mexico	
19	Win	16–3	Jesús Acosta Zazueta	UD	10	Dec 21, 2013	Gimnasio Rodrigo M. Quevedo, Chihuahua, Mexico	
18	Win	15–3	Carlos Medellín	UD	6	Sep 7, 2013	Casino, Apodaca, Mexico	
17	Win	14–3	Carlos Rodríguez	UD	6	Jun 22, 2013	Hotel Azul Ixtapa, Ixtapa-Zihuatanejo, Mexico	
16	Win	13–3	Hector Esnar Bobadilla	TKO	5 (10), 2:30	Mar 23, 2013	Centro de Espectáculos "La Macarena", Uruapan, Mexico	
15	Loss	12–3	Hozumi Hasegawa	UD	10	Dec 22, 2012	Central Gym, Kobe, Japan	
14	Win	12–2	Khabir Suleymanov	UD	12	Aug 4, 2012	Centro de Convenciones, Mazatlán, Mexico	Won vacant WBF (Federation) super bantamweight title
13	Loss	11–2	Fernando Montiel	SD	12	Jun 9, 2012	Gimnasio Manuel Bernardo Aguirre, Chihuahua, Mexico	
12	Win	11–1	Javier Mercado Delgadillo	UD	10	Jan 14, 2012	Coliseo Olimpico de la UG, Guadalajara, Mexico	
11	Win	10–1	Alexander Espinoza	TD	9 (10)	Jun 11, 2011	Auditorio Miguel Barragán, San Luis Potosí, Mexico	Unanimous TD; Won vacant WBA Fedecaribe super bantamweight title
10	Win	9–1	Arturo Estrada	UD	8	Mar 19, 2011	Gimnasio de la AUT, Tampico, Mexico	
9	Win	8–1	José Tamayo González	TD	3 (4), 3:00	Jan 29, 2011	Estadio Banorte, Culiacán, Mexico	Unanimous TD; The bout went to the scorecards before the last round because of technical problems with the halogen light installations
8	Win	7–1	Pablo Cupul	SD	6	Nov 6, 2010	Poliforum Zamna, Mérida, Mexico	
7	Win	6–1	Arturo Estrada	UD	10	Aug 13, 2010	Club de Leones, Nuevo Laredo, Mexico	
6	Loss	5–1	Jesús Galicia	UD	10	Dec 12, 2009	Plaza de Toros Rea, Mazatlán, Mexico	Lost WBC Youth Intercontinental super bantamweight title
5	Win	5–0	Narciso Lara	TKO	4 (10), 1:58	Nov 21, 2009	Palenque dela EXPOMEX, Nuevo Laredo, Mexico	Won vacant WBC Youth Intercontinental super bantamweight title
4	Win	4–0	Hugo Pacheco	KO	1 (6), 2:40	Sep 12, 2009	Arena Monterrey, Monterrey, Mexico	
3	Win	3–0	Eduardo Gutiérrez	TKO	2 (4), 1:25	Aug 29, 2009	Ciudad Deportiva, Mexicali, Mexico	
2	Win	2–0	Alberto Chuc Uicab	UD	6	Aug 15, 2009	Palacio Municipal, Cozumel, Mexico	
1	Win	1–0	Eduardo Avaca	KO	3 (6), 1:15	Jun 27, 2009	Plaza de Toros, Nuevo Laredo, Mexico	
