= La Covacha =

Miami Latin nightclub (1989–2017)

- Interactive map of the La Covacha area

General information
- Type: Nightclub and live music venue
- Location: 10730 NW 25th Street, Miami, Florida
- Coordinates: 25.8110°N 80.3704°W
- Opened: 1989

La Covacha was a restaurant, nightclub, and live music venue in the Doral/Sweetwater area of west Miami-Dade, Florida. Founded in 1989 by Aurelio F. Rodríguez and his mother, Teresa Rodríguez, on the site of a family truck stop, it became a prominent Latin nightlife venue, covered by Billboard, Newsweek, and The New York Times.

During the 1990s and 2000s, La Covacha was described as playing a key role in Miami's expanding Latin nightlife and as a promotional platform for new Latin acts entering the U.S. market. Newsweek identified it as a Miami gathering place for the bilingual, bicultural "Generation Ñ" cohort, and a 2003 Miami Herald feature characterized its crowd as drawn from across the Latin world. Miami New Times named it "Best Latin Club" four times between 1999 and 2015. The venue closed in 2017.

== History ==
=== Origins (1989–1995) ===
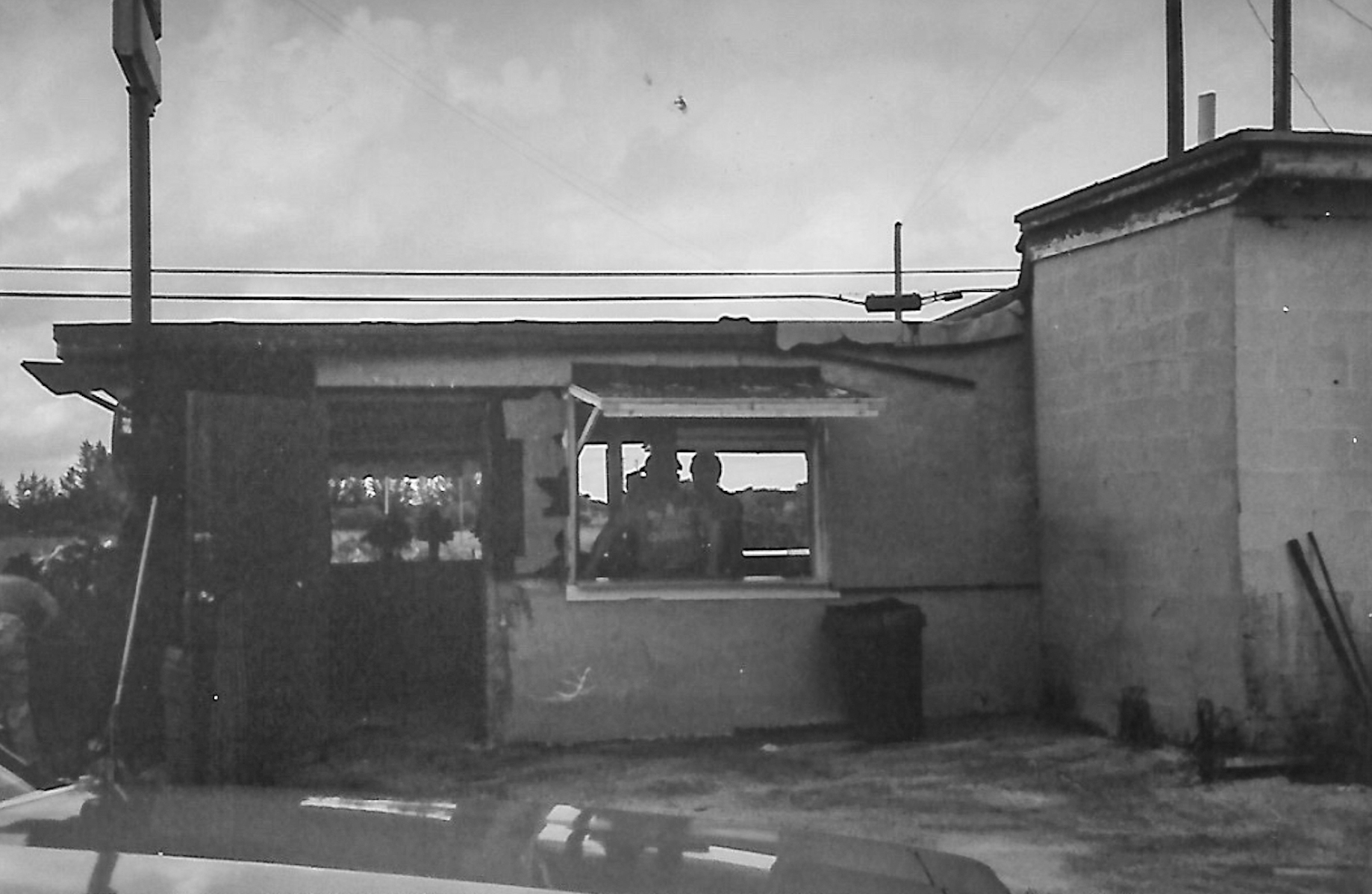
La Covacha truck stop exterior, late 1980s

La Covacha began as a cafeteria attached to a truck stop on NW 25th Street, just west of the Palmetto Expressway, in an industrial corridor near Doral and Sweetwater. After his father's death in 1989, Cuban-born former model Aurelio Rodríguez inherited the business and, with his mother Teresa Rodríguez and other family members, converted it into a roadhouse-style bar and eventually a full nightclub.

Early reporting in Miami New Times described the original La Covacha as a "raucous" rustic venue with thatched-roof palapas, barbecue, picnic tables, and a mixed crowd of truckers, working-class locals, and Latin music fans. By the early 1990s its programming included salsa, merengue, vallenato, and a Sunday rock en español night known as La Cárcel (The Jail), which helped bring in a younger Latin-American audience.

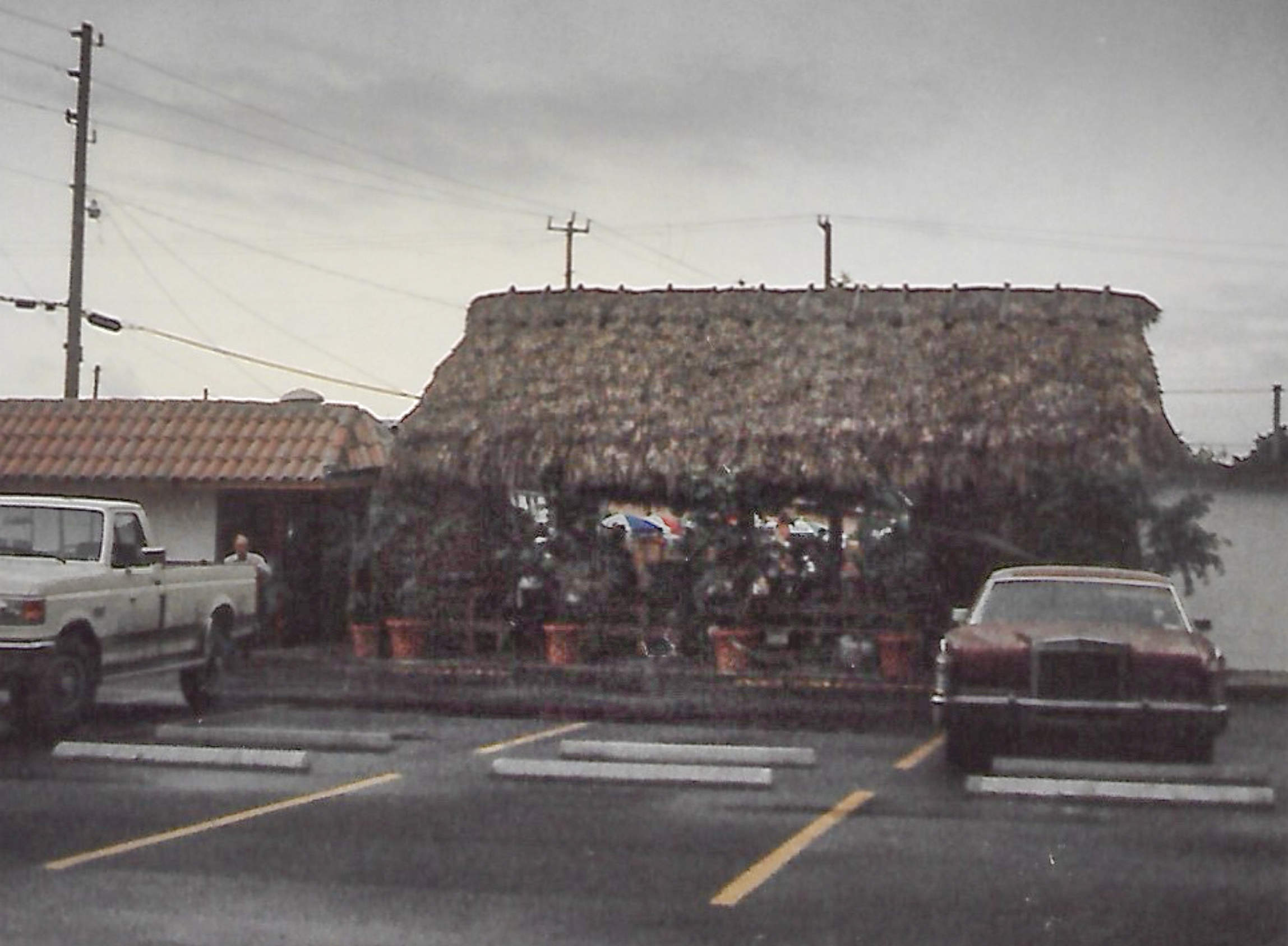
Exterior of La Covacha, 1994

=== Fire, tent era, and rebuild (1995–2000) ===
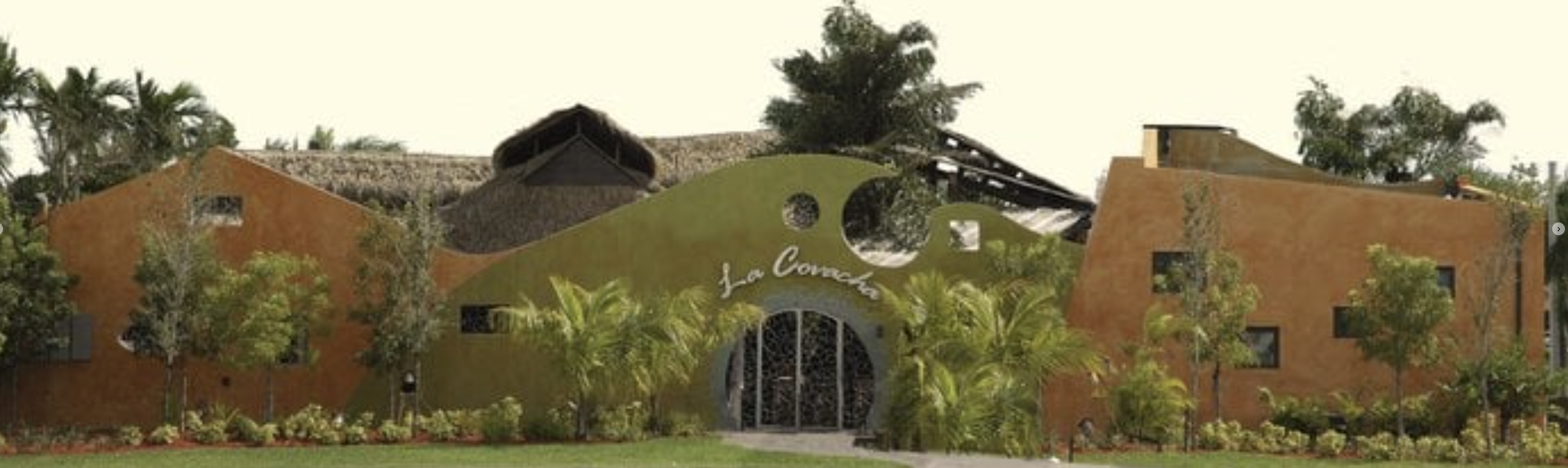
Exterior of La Covacha, 2015

Rather than closing the business, Rodríguez had the ruins bulldozed, cleared the site, and set up a large pop-up white tent in the parking lot. Weekend parties continued under the tent with barbecue, recorded music, and makeshift bars while a more permanent rebuild was planned. William Lane later assisted in redesigning the venue.

By 2000 La Covacha had undergone a "million-dollar" renovation. New features included a back-yard stage, upgraded sound system, new kitchen, and an air-conditioned VIP lounge, while the outdoor patio and rustic aesthetic remained.

== Controversies ==
La Covacha appears in a 2002 Miami New Times article on a campaign-finance investigation involving Miami-Dade commissioner Miriam Alonso, where the club was mentioned as one of several businesses connected to checks allegedly routed through intermediaries.

In late 2008 and early 2009, scheduled performances by Cuban salsa singer Paulito FG at La Covacha became a flashpoint in Miami's long-running debates over cultural engagement with artists from Cuba. The controversy began in November 2008 when Paulito FG, appearing on the Miami Spanish-language television program Entre Nos, stated that he had "believed in El Comandante" and that "Fidel has not deceived me."

The remarks drew sharp criticism from some in Miami's Cuban-American exile community, including musicians Willie Chirino, Amaury Gutiérrez, and Arturo Sandoval, who noted that none of them could perform in Cuba or have their music broadcast there. The exile organization Vigilia Mambisa called for boycotts of his appearances. Paulito FG's November 2008 shows at La Covacha proceeded amid protests. A larger concert planned for February 2009 at Hialeah's Amelia Earhart Park was cancelled after Hialeah mayor Julio Robaina said the event was organized "to provoke."

Proprietor Teresa Klumpp said she would not cancel La Covacha's shows and had notified police about threats the venue received.

In August 2017, while La Covacha was under new management, a video of a dance competition drew criticism after participants stripped on stage. The City of Sweetwater closed the venue for violating a city ordinance; it did not reopen.

== Role in the Latin music scene ==
During the 1990s and early 2000s, La Covacha was repeatedly cited in national and regional press as a key node in Miami's expanding Latin nightlife infrastructure. A February 1995 Billboard feature on the city's Latin-club boom reported that venues such as La Covacha functioned as promotional platforms for record labels and radio stations seeking to introduce new Latin artists to U.S. audiences, and noted that the club drew "a broad range of patrons," including prominent attorneys, South Beach hipsters, and "slumming celebs such as Madonna and Anjelica Huston."

By the late 1990s, the club had become associated with what Newsweek termed "Generation Ñ," a bilingual, bicultural cohort of young Latinos navigating both U.S. and Latin American cultural spheres. The magazine's 1999 cover story identified La Covacha as a Miami gathering place for U.S.-raised Latinos.

A 2003 Miami Herald feature on Latin nightlife observed that La Covacha had evolved from "one of the centers of the Cuban and tropical night-life scene" in West Dade into "more like a center for the whole Latin world," with crowds mixing Colombians, Venezuelans, Argentines, Cubans, and other nationalities.

The venue served as a stage for touring acts from across Latin America and Spain, hosting reviewed performances including Calle 13 in 2007 and annual Barranquilla-style Carnaval celebrations that by 2006 had run for seven years and drew crowds of around 2,000, featuring vallenato acts such as Silvestre Dangond, Los Hermanos Zuleta, and Binomio de Oro.

Miami New Times named La Covacha "Best Latin Club" four times, in 1999, 2001, 2005, and 2015. In its 2005 write-up, the paper described the venue as "a nonstop Latin music party for residents of the western part of the county and those willing to make the trip," concluding: "Not all of the best clubs are on the Beach, as La Covacha proves."

In retrospectives on Miami's club history, La Covacha has been remembered as one of the key Latin-focused venues of the 1990s and 2000s and as a stepping stone for a later generation of Miami promoters and DJs. A 2024 Gray Area feature on the promoter collective Link Miami Rebels identified the venue as the group's starting point in nightlife promotion; beginning in the late 2000s the collective hosted weekly "Cove Love Thursdays" in an interior room at the club, programming house and techno alongside the existing Latin lineup, before eventually purchasing downtown nightclub Club Space in 2016.
