= One Day Since Yesterday: Peter Bogdanovich & the Lost American Film =

2014 documentary film directed by Bill Teck

- Theatrical release poster
- Directed by: Bill Teck
- Produced by: Victor Barroso; Brett Ratner
- Starring: Peter Bogdanovich; Wes Anderson; Noah Baumbach; Quentin Tarantino; Anna Thea Bogdanovich; Antonia Bogdanovich
- Cinematography: Bill Teck
- Edited by: Mario de Varona
- Production company: ViaVerita
- Release date: August 25, 2014 (United States)
- Running time: 97 minutes
- Country: United States
- Language: English

One Day Since Yesterday: Peter Bogdanovich & the Lost American Film is a 2014 American documentary film directed by Bill Teck. Produced by Victor Barroso and Brett Ratner, the film explores the life and career of filmmaker Peter Bogdanovich, particularly focusing on the making, release, and legacy of his 1981 film They All Laughed.

== Synopsis ==
The documentary provides an in-depth look at Peter Bogdanovich's life during a challenging period, highlighted by his relationship with actress Dorothy Stratten, whose murder during the post-production of They All Laughed left a profound impact on Bogdanovich. The film examines the struggle to release They All Laughed after its studio decided to shelve it, leading Bogdanovich to buy back the rights and distribute it himself at great personal cost. Through interviews with Bogdanovich, his daughters, and peers like Quentin Tarantino, Jeff Bridges, Wes Anderson, Noah Baumbach, Cybill Shepherd, Ben Gazzara, Frank Marshall, Andrew Sarris, Colleen Camp, Louise Stratten, and Molly Haskell, the documentary explores themes of artistic passion, personal tragedy, and the revival of an overlooked film.

== Production ==
Bill Teck directed and served as cinematographer for One Day Since Yesterday, capturing the essence of Bogdanovich's story through both new and archival footage. Victor Barroso and Brett Ratner produced the film. Bill Berg-Hillinger acted as Supervising Editor, shaping the narrative from various sources. Post-production work was done at RIMA Digital. The production was facilitated by ViaVerita, ensuring the documentary's completion and distribution. The film's poster was created by the artist Rory Kurtz for Mondo.

== Release ==
The documentary premiered at the 2014 Venice Film Festival in a two-hour form without Wes Anderson, Noah Baumbach, and Linda McEwan, but the version shown at the Buenos Aires International Film Festival and on Netflix in April 2016 was radically different, featuring a new soundtrack, different editing structure, additional interviews, and an altered run time. It is currently available through streaming services, Peacock and Tubi. It also screened at the Vienna International Film Festival in 2014, Santa Fe International Film Festival in 2015, Chicago International Film Festival in 2016. In 2018, it showed at the Villa Lumière in Lyon during the Lumière Festival and premiered on French television. The French DVD of One Day Since Yesterday was included in the hard cover of Jean-Baptiste Thoret's epic collection of interviews with Bogdanovich, Cinema as elegy, which was released by Carlotta Films.

In September 2024, Director Bill Teck, working with Louise Stratten and Rebecca Smith, was able to finally clear the music rights for They All Laughed, the film One Day Since Yesterday is about, allowing it to stream on HBO Max for the first time, as well as to be shown on TCM, which had been one of Bogdanovich's last wishes.

== Reception ==
The documentary garnered significant acclaim from critics and viewers alike.The Hollywood Reporter wrote: "The groundswell in favor of reconsidering They All Laughed alongside Peter Bogdanovich's most significant work continues with this exhaustive appreciation." Cinema Retro magazine described the documentary as "Haunting and bittersweet. Bogdanovich bravely lays his soul bare in this remarkable film." Rory O'Conner at Moviepilot lauded the film as "Terrific! As impassioned as it is insightful." Craig Duffy from the Cinematic Life noted its narrative structure, stating: "A real arc - a satisfying & heartbreaking whole all cinephiles should seek out as soon as possible." Susan Vahabzadeh from the Süddeutsche Zeitung described the film as "A Small Masterpiece. A Highlight of the Vienna Film Festival." Guy Lodge from Variety found it "Affectionate and Affecting."
