= Bill Teck =

American documentary filmmaker and writer

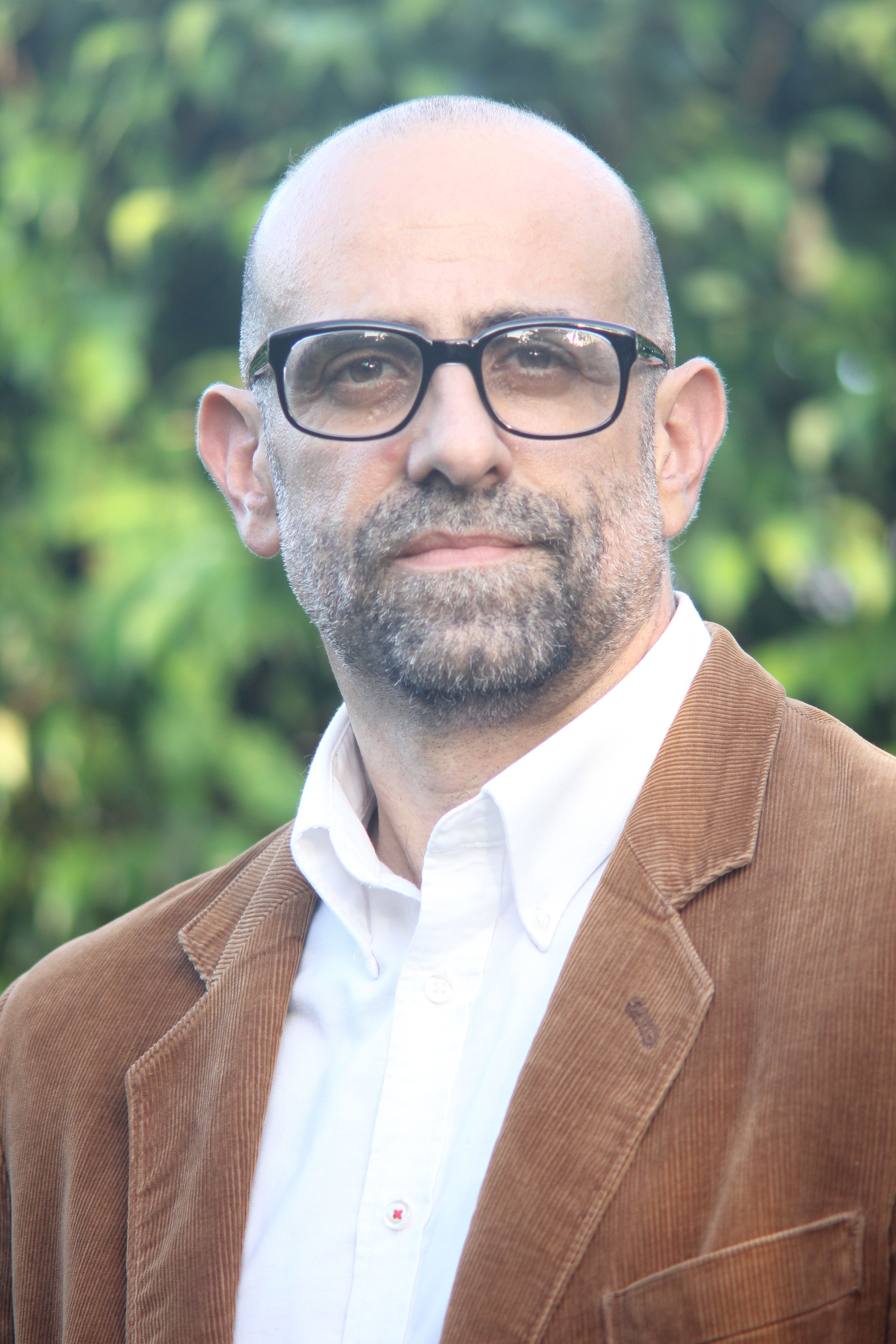
- Film Director Bill Teck
- Born: 1967 (age 58–59); Miami, Florida, U.S.
- Education: Florida International University
- Occupations: Director; writer; producer
- Years active: 1986–present
- Notable work: One Day Since Yesterday: Peter Bogdanovich & the Lost American Film (2014); Stevie Van Zandt: Disciple (2024)

Bill Teck (born 1967) is an American documentary filmmaker, producer, and writer based in Miami. He is known for his documentaries One Day Since Yesterday: Peter Bogdanovich & the Lost American Film (2014), which premiered at the Venice Film Festival and helped elevate They All Laughed alongside Peter Bogdanovich's most celebrated work, and Stevie Van Zandt: Disciple (2024), an HBO Documentary Films feature that premiered at the Tribeca Festival and received a nomination for the Grammy Award for Best Music Film.

Teck is also credited for coining the term "Generation Ñ" in the mid-1990s to describe American-born, bicultural Latinos. In a July 1999 cover story about bicultural Latino identity, Newsweek reported that Teck created and copyrighted the term in 1995 as a brand, which led to related television programs, a magazine, and a podcast. The term evolved beyond a marketing concept into a broader cultural identifier, with institutions such as the University of Miami adopting it as the theme for their Hispanic Heritage Month celebrations.

== Early life and education ==
Teck was born and raised in Miami to a Jewish father and Cuban mother in a bilingual household.

Teck attended South Florida Military Academy in Miami, and afterwards attended Miami Dade College, where he earned associate degrees in broadcasting and cinematography. He studied communications at Florida International University.

== Career ==
=== Early career and influences ===
As a teenager, Teck was a regular at the Beaumont Cinema (now Bill Cosford Cinema) at the University of Miami, where he watched films by directors such as Robert Altman, Federico Fellini, Peter Bogdanovich, and John Cassavetes.

=== generation ñ and media ===
generation ñ brand logo

In the mid-1990s, while working various jobs in Miami including teaching and sales, Teck felt that the Generation X label did not represent his experience as a bilingual Latino. He coined the term "generation ñ" (pronounced "en-yay") to describe American-born Latinos who grew up navigating between their parents' Hispanic heritage and American mainstream culture. The term uses the Spanish letter ñ, a symbol associated with Spanish-language identity, to distinguish this demographic. According to Newsweek, he copyrighted the term in 1995 as a brand.

In 1996, Teck and partners Lynn Norman, Vivian Galainena, and Delio Nuñez Menocal started generation ñ magazine with $3,000. The magazine featured interviews with artists such as Celia Cruz and Tito Puente, as well as articles about the Beastie Boys and Andy Warhol, freely mixing English and Spanish. A 1999 Sun-Sentinel profile noted that Teck "envisioned a magazine that spoke to his bicultural generation with a pop sensibility," describing the generation ñ credo as embracing both "Santa Barbara and Captain Kirk, Álvarez Guedes and K.C. and the Sunshine Band."

By 1998, Teck had expanded into television, hosting and executive producing Outloud, a live show airing five nights a week on WAMI-TV. The following year, he hosted and executive produced Live, an interstitial program featuring segments filmed throughout Miami. The generation ñ television show also ran on WAMI, and Teck worked to develop a national version. He produced or executive-produced programs for PBS and USA Broadcasting, including generation ñ and ñ Life with Melissa Hernandez.

Teck also co-hosted a daily radio show and El Nuevo Herald featured syndicated content from generation ñ. During this period, the generation ñ brand expanded beyond Miami to New York City and Los Angeles, where nightclubs sponsored Ñ events. By this time, Teck was represented by the William Morris Agency.

In 2007, he launched generation ñ.tv, an early broadband content channel targeting English-dominant Latino audiences through web shows and Spanglish content, partnering with PBS to extend the programming onto broadcast television.

==== Cultural context and later influence ====
The emergence of Generation Ñ coincided with growing attention to English-dominant Latinos as a distinct demographic, a subject examined by anthropologist Arlene Dávila in her study Latinos, Inc.: The Marketing and Making of a People (2001). Similar terms exist for a number of other bicultural demographics, such as "American-born Chinese" (ABC) and "Nisei" (second-generation Japanese Americans). In 2000, the University of Miami adopted "Generation Ñ" as the theme for its Hispanic Heritage Month celebration, with Teck delivering a talk entitled "Generation ñ: The Dawn of a New Generation." The term has also been applied to Latin American immigrants in Canada, where a Financial Post profile described young entrepreneurs as part of "Generation Ñ."

=== Directorial work ===
==== Early filmmaking ====
Poster for El Florida (1999)

In 1999, Teck made his directorial debut with El Florida (a transliteration of "Florida room" as spoken by Miami-based Cubans), also known as Cuba on My Back, a film he co-wrote with childhood friend Carlos Bello and film critic David Dayoub, based on a story by them and Lynn Norman. Made for $44,000, the bilingual comedy-drama follows two cousins, one in Cuba, one in Little Havana, as one dreams of freedom while the other squanders his on schemes and quick fixes. An homage to Teck's bicultural heritage, the film explores themes of family separation and exile. The film opened at the Tower Theater in Little Havana, grossing about $8,000 per week during its short run, and later screened at film festivals and colleges.

==== Documentary filmmaking ====
===== One Day Since Yesterday: Peter Bogdanovich & the Lost American Film =====
In 2014, Teck directed One Day Since Yesterday: Peter Bogdanovich & the Lost American Film. Produced by Victor Barroso and Brett Ratner, the film explores the life and career of director Peter Bogdanovich, particularly focusing on the making of his 1981 film They All Laughed and his relationship with actress Dorothy Stratten, who was murdered during post-production. Teck also served as the film's cinematographer. The documentary premiered at the Venice Film Festival and later screened at the Vienna International Film Festival, Santa Fe Film Festival, Chicago International Film Festival, Buenos Aires International Festival of Independent Cinema (BAFICI), and the Lumière Festival in Lyon, France, where it was shown at the historic Villa Lumière, home of the Lumière brothers.

Variety called the documentary "affectionate and affecting." The Hollywood Reporter noted that the film makes a case for reconsidering They All Laughed alongside Bogdanovich's most significant work. The documentary features interviews with Quentin Tarantino, Jeff Bridges, Wes Anderson, Noah Baumbach, Cybill Shepherd, Ben Gazzara, Frank Marshall, Andrew Sarris, Colleen Camp, and Louise Stratten. In September 2024, Teck worked with Louise Stratten and Rebecca Smith to clear the music rights for They All Laughed, allowing it to stream on Max and air on TCM for the first time—one of Bogdanovich's final wishes before his death in 2022.

===== Stevie Van Zandt: Disciple =====
In 2024, Teck directed and produced Stevie Van Zandt: Disciple, an HBO Documentary Films feature that chronicles the life and career of Steven Van Zandt, known for his roles as a musician with Bruce Springsteen's E Street Band and as an actor in The Sopranos and Lilyhammer, as well as his work as a social activist. Teck first pitched the documentary in 2006 and again in 2014; it was initially conceived as a three-part docuseries before landing at HBO. The film premiered at the Tribeca Festival and features interviews with Bruce Springsteen, Paul McCartney, Bono, Eddie Vedder, Darlene Love, Joan Jett, Jackson Browne, David Chase, and Southside Johnny.

Richard Roeper of the Chicago Sun-Times called the documentary "comprehensive, entertaining and star-studded." CNN wrote that the documentary "wears its soul, and its love for the music these artists created." On Rotten Tomatoes, the film holds a 90% approval rating. The film received a nomination for the Grammy Award for Best Music Film at the 67th Annual Grammy Awards.

=== Writing ===
Cover of The Official Spanglish Dictionary

Teck co-wrote The Official Spanglish Dictionary (Touchstone/Simon & Schuster, 1998) with Bill Cruz, credited as "Editors of Generation n." The humor book contains more than 300 words and phrases that blend Spanish and English, reflecting the Spanglish spoken by bicultural Latinos of Generation Ñ.

His writing has appeared in Latina, Tablet, The New York Press, The Miami Herald, Rock and Rap Confidential, Hispanic Magazine, Channel Magazine, Fashion Spectrum, the Miami Herald's Viernes, and Street Magazine. As editor or publisher, he has been responsible for Generation ñ magazine, Onda Miami for the Knight Ridder Newspaper Group, and Estilos De Vida.

== Awards and honors ==
- Named one of "20 Latinos to Watch" by Newsweek magazine (2000)
- Named one of the "100 Most Influential Hispanics in America" by Hispanic Business magazine
- Entrepreneur of the Year by Hispanic Business magazine
- Honoree for Achievement by the National Council of La Raza
- Grammy Award for Best Music Film nomination for Stevie Van Zandt: Disciple (2025)

== Selected filmography ==
Year	Title	Role(s)
1999	El Florida (Cuba on My Back)	Director, co-writer
2014	One Day Since Yesterday: Peter Bogdanovich & the Lost American Film	Director, cinematographer
2024	Stevie Van Zandt: Disciple	Director, producer

== Bibliography ==
- The Official Spanglish Dictionary: Un User's Guía to More Than 300 Words and Phrases That Aren't Exactly Español or Inglés (1998) — co-author (with Bill Cruz)
