= Daud Yordan =

Indonesian boxer (born 1987)

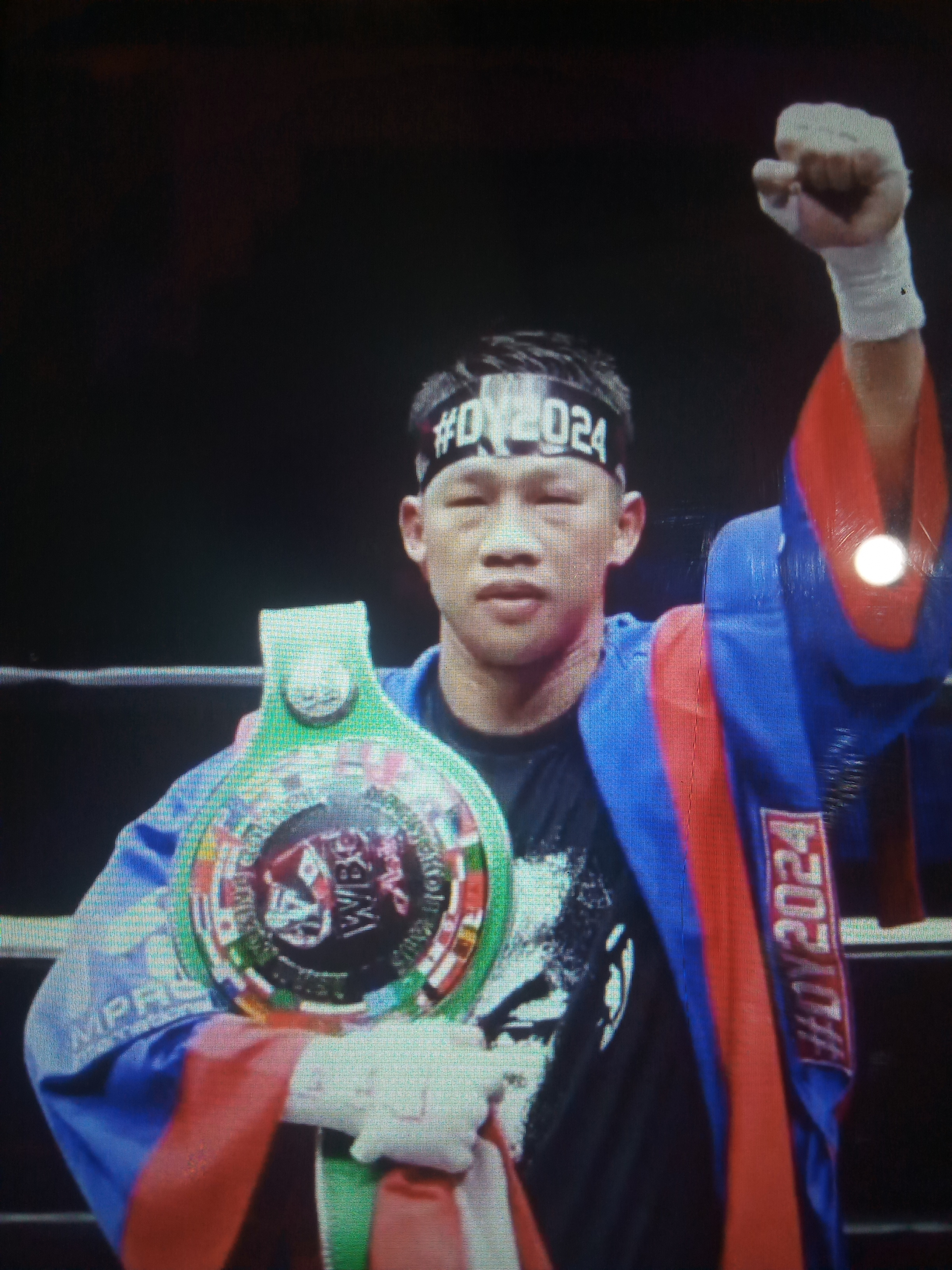

Personal information
- Nickname: Cino
- Nationality: (Indonesia) Indonesian
- Born: Daud Yordan; June 10, 1987 (age 39) Ketapang, Indonesia
- Height: 5 ft 7 in (170 cm)
- Weight: Featherweight; Lightweight; Super Lightweight

Boxing career
- Reach: 68 in (173 cm)
- Stance: Orthodox

Boxing record
- Total fights: 48
- Wins: 43
- Win by KO: 31
- Losses: 4
- No contests: 1

Daud "Cino" Yordan (born 10 June 1987) is an Indonesian professional boxer and former IBO Featherweight and Lightweight Champion.

== Early life and family ==
Yordan was born in Ketapang, West Borneo, Indonesia on 10 June 1987. He is the fifth child of six children to Hermanus Lai Cun, a Chinese father and Natalia, a Dayak mother.

His former trainer, Carlos Jesus Penate Torres from Cuba, have Yordan the nickname of Cino (Chino in Spanish). Since then, he has always been known by the nickname.

== Professional career ==
Yordan won his first 23 fights. Most of these wins were against national level opponents, which included notable wins against Surasak Makordae and José Antonio Meza Jimenez, the latter being his American debut. He then fought Robert Guerrero, his first fight on HBO, where the fight ended as a no contest after an accidental head clash in the second round. After this he started fighting higher level opponents, beating Robert Allanic, by KO, and Ricky Sismundo, by TKO. Yordan suffered his first professional loss against the seasoned veteran Celestino Caballero by UD. He won his first minor belt, the WBO Asia-Pacific Featherweight Title, after defeating Damian David Marchiano.

Yordan then fought for the WBA featherweight title against Chris John on 17 April 2011 at the Jakarta International Expo, Kemayoran, Central Jakarta where he lost by unanimous decision. Yordan continued to fight higher level opponents which resulted in him winning the IBO featherweight title after beating Lorenzo Villanueva. He made his first defense of his title against Choi Tseveenpurev, which he won by UD. He then lost his title to Simpiwe Vetyeka after losing to him by a TKO in the twelfth round.

After this loss, he moved up to lightweight where he instantly won the IBO belt against Daniel Brizuela by UD. He defended the title against Sipho Taliwe, where some critics thought he lost as he scraped through to get a SD win. During 2014 to 2017, he went on to win his next five fights at lightweight beating questionably lower level opponents which resulted in him rising through the WBO lightweight rankings and accumulating the WBO Asia-Pacific and Africa Lightweight Title, WBO Africa Lightweight Title and the WBA International Lightweight Title after defeating Cristian Rafael Coria. Yordan then beat previously unbeaten Pavel Malikov on 22 April 2018 by a KO which was caused by an impressive combination that targeted Malikov's body. This won him the WBO Inter-Continental Lightweight Title and cemented his name in future title eliminators and title fights.

Yordan called out former WBC, WBA and The Ring lightweight champion Jorge Linares on Instagram in August 2018 and a future fight between them is lingering as Linares continues to rebuild his career after being stopped by Vasyl Lomachenko.

Yordan fought Anthony Crolla on 10 November 2018 in the Manchester Arena. Crolla had a good start over Yordan, whose big moment came in the sixth round, when he pressured Crolla against the ropes and caused Crolla some punishment. Crolla regained himself in the remainer of the fight, and won the fight via unanimous decision.

In his next fight, Yordan beat Aekkawee Kaewmanee in a rough match, via sixth-round TKO.

On November 17, 2019, Yordan fought and defeated Michael Mokoena via eighth-round TKO.

On November 19, 2021, Yordan won the WBC Asian Boxing Council Silver Super Lightweight title by defeating Thai boxer Rachata Khaophimai. He won the match by TKO in the fifth round.

On July 1, 2022, Yordan defended the WBC Asian Boxing Council Silver Super Lightweight Title by defeating Thai boxer Panya Uthok and won the match by TKO in the sixth round.

Yordan was scheduled to face George Kambosos Jr. at the Qudos Bank Arena, Sydney Olympic Park on 22 March 2025. At the start of the fight week, it was announced that Yordan was pulled out due to medical reasons.

== Professional boxing record ==
48 fights	43 wins	4 losses
By knockout	32	1
By decision	11	3
No contests	1	

Result	Record	Opponent	Type	Round, time	Date	Location	Notes
Win	44–4	(Philippines) Ador Torres	UD	8	2026-10-11	Terpadu Ayani Sports Arena, Pontianak, Indonesia	Won ABF Diamond Super Welterweight Title.
Win	43–4	(Argentina) Hernan Leandro Carrizo	KO	8 (12), 0:26	2024-09-07	Terpadu Ayani Sports Arena, Pontianak, Indonesia	Retained IBA (world) Super Lightweight Title.
Win	42–4	(Thailand) Panya Uthok	TKO	6 (10), 3:00	2022-07-01	Balai Sarbini, Jakarta, Indonesia	Retained WBC Asian Boxing Council Silver Super Lightweight Title.
Win	41–4	(Thailand) Rachata Khaophimai	TKO	5 (10), 0:43	2021-11-19	World Siam Stadium, Bangkok, Thailand	Won WBC Asian Boxing Council Silver Super Lightweight Title.
Win	40–4	(South Africa) Michael Mokoena	TKO	8 (12), 2:57	2019-11-17	Jawa Timur Park 3, Batu, Indonesia	Won IBA (world) and WBO (Oriental) Super lightweight Titles.
Win	39–4	(Thailand) Aekkawee Kaewmanee	TKO	5 (10), 3:00	2019-08-04	Bone Night Club, Pattaya, Thailand	Won WBC International Challenge Belt Super Lightweight Title.
Loss	38–4	(United Kingdom) Anthony Crolla	UD	12	2018-11-10	Manchester Arena, Manchester, United Kingdom	
Win	38–3	(Russia) Pavel Malikov	KO	8 (12), 1:50	2018-04-22	DIVS, Ekaterinburg, Russia	Won WBO Inter-Continental Lightweight Title.
Win	37–3	(Thailand) Campee Phayom	KO	2 (8), 2:13	2017-03-25	OCBC Arena, Singapore	
Win	36–3	(Argentina) Cristian Rafael Coria	UD	10	2016-06-04	Radisson Victoria Plaza, Montevideo, Uruguay	Won Interim WBA International Lightweight Title.
Win	35–3	(Japan) Yoshitaka Kato	TD	9 (12)	2016-02-05	Balai Sarbini, Jakarta, Indonesia	Retained WBO Asia-Pacific and Africa Lightweight Title.
Win	34–3	(Ghana) Maxwell Awuku	UD	12	2015-06-06	DBL Arena, Surabaya, Indonesia	Retained Interim WBO Asia-Pacific Lightweight Title. Won vacant WBO Africa Lightweight Title.
Win	33–3	(Philippines) Ronald Pontillas	TKO	5 (12), 2:25	2014-12-20	Pangasuma Stadium, Pontianak, Indonesia	Won Interim WBO Asia-Pacific Lightweight Title.
Win	32–3	(South Africa) Sipho Taliwe	SD	12	2013-12-06	Metro City, Northbridge, Western Australia	Retained IBO Lightweight Title.
Win	31–3	(Argentina) Daniel Brizuela	UD	12	2013-07-06	Metro City, Northbridge, Western Australia	Won vacant IBO Lightweight Title.
Loss	30–3	(South Africa) Simpiwe Vetyeka	TKO	12 (12), 2:12	2013-04-14	Indoor Tennis Stadium, Jakarta	Lost IBO Featherweight Title.
Win	30–2	(Mongolia) Choi Tseveenpurev	UD	12	2012-11-09	Marina Bay Sands Hotel, Singapore	Retained IBO Featherweight Title.
Win	29–2	(Philippines) Lorenzo Villanueva	KO	2 (12), 1:06	2012-05-05	Marina Bay Sands Hotel, Singapore	Won vacant IBO Featherweight Title.
Win	28–2	(United States) Frankie Archuleta	TKO	4 (10), 2:02	2011-11-30	Challenge Stadium, Mount Claremont, Western Australia	Won vacant IBO Asia-Pacific Featherweight Title.
Loss	27–2	(Indonesia) Chris John	UD	12	2011-04-17	Jakarta International Expo, Jakarta	For WBA (Super) Featherweight Title.
Win	27–1	(Argentina) Damian David Marchiano	TKO	1 (12)	2010-12-05	Indoor Tennis Stadium, Jakarta	Won Interim WBO Asia-Pacific Featherweight Title.
Win	26–1	(Philippines) Christian Abila	KO	6 (10), 2:32	2010-09-26	Arayata Sports Complex, Tanza, Cavite	
Loss	25–1	(Panama) Celestino Caballero	UD	12	2010-04-10	BankAtlantic Center, Sunrise, Florida	
Win	25–0	(Philippines) Ricky Sismundo	RTD	10 (12), 3:00	2009-08-15	Twin Plaza Hotel, Jakarta	Retained Interim WBO Oriental Featherweight Title.
Win	24–0	(Philippines) Robert Allanic	KO	2 (12)	2009-06-27	Pontianak	Won Interim WBO Oriental Featherweight Title.
NC	1 NC	(United States) Robert Guerrero	ND	2 (10), 1:47	2009-03-07	HP Pavilion, San Jose, California	For vacant NABO Junior Lightweight Title.
Win	23–0	(Indonesia) Hardian Siregar	TKO	2 (8)	2008-12-22	Indosiar Studio, Jakarta, Indonesia	
Win	22–0	(Mexico) Antonio Meza	MD	8	2008-09-13	MGM Grand, Las Vegas, Nevada	
Win	21–0	(Thailand) Thongthai Rajanondh	TKO	3 (10)	2008-06-16	Indosiar Studio, Jakarta, Indonesia	
Win	20–0	(Indonesia) Zoel Fidal	TKO	2 (8)	2008-03-03	Indosiar Studio, Jakarta, Indonesia	
Win	19–0	(Indonesia) Bogi Gonzales	TKO	1 (8)	2008-02-04	Indosiar Studio, Jakarta, Indonesia	
Win	18–0	(Indonesia) Yulio Moro	UD	8	2007-12-10	Indosiar Studio, Jakarta, Indonesia	
Win	17–0	(Thailand) Peesaddaeng Kiatsakthanee	TKO	4 (10)	2007-09-27	Indosiar Studio, Jakarta, Indonesia	
Win	16–0	(Kazakhstan) Farid Safiulin	TKO	3 (10)	2007-07-26	Indosiar Studio, Jakarta, Indonesia	Retained WBO Asia-Pacific Youth Featherweight Title.
Win	15–0	(Indonesia) Reman Salim	KO	8 (10)	2007-05-17	Indosiar Studio, Jakarta, Indonesia	Won vacant WBO Asia-Pacific Youth Featherweight Title.
Win	14–0	(Thailand) Ekawit Sithsorwor	TKO	2 (6)	2007-03-15	Swissotel, Singapore	
Win	13–0	(Indonesia) Leed Shabu	UD	10	2007-03-01	Indosiar Studio, Jakarta, Indonesia	
Win	12–0	(Indonesia) Yulio Moro	UD	8	2007-01-11	Indosiar Studio, Jakarta, Indonesia	
Win	11–0	(Thailand) Saman Ekwanchai	PTS	8	2006-11-18	Indonesia	
Win	10–0	(Indonesia) Boy Manullang	TKO	3 (10)	2006-11-02	Indosiar Studio, Jakarta, Indonesia	
Win	9–0	(Thailand) Kongtoranee Sithtradtrakan	TKO	7 (8)	2006-09-09	Soemantri Brodjonegoro Sports Hall, Jakarta, Indonesia	
Win	8–0	(Indonesia) Yuvensius La Ende	TKO	5 (8)	2006-07-20	Indonesia	
Win	7–0	(Thailand) Narong Sor Chitralada	KO	2 (4)	2006-06-15	Swissotel, Singapore	
Win	6–0	(Indonesia) Adrianus Kaauni	TKO	7 (8)	2006-05-11	Indosiar Studio, Jakarta, Indonesia	
Win	5–0	(Indonesia) Sandi Loreng	TKO	3 (8)	2006-05-11	Indosiar Studio, Jakarta, Indonesia	
Win	4–0	(Indonesia) Gonzales Bin Anur	TKO	5 (8)	2006-01-12	Indonesia	
Win	3–0	(Indonesia) Lato Vegas	PTS	8	2005-12-15	Indonesia	
Win	2–0	(Indonesia) Muhammad Diding	TKO	1 (6)	2005-10-13	Indonesia	
Win	1–0	(Indonesia) Anshori Anhar Pitulay	TKO	1 (6)	2005-08-25	Indonesia	Professional debut

=== Cancelled fights ===
On October 14, 2022, Yordan would defend IBA (world) Super Lightweight Title against Zoravor Petrosian of Ukraine. However, on October 2, the match was cancelled due to his hand injury.

Sporting positions
Vacant Title last held by Jhonny González	IBO featherweight champion May 5, 2012 – April 14, 2013	Succeeded by Simpiwe Vetyeka
Vacant Title last held by Emiliano Marsili	IBO lightweight champion July 6, 2013 – 2014	Vacant Title next held by Xolisani Ndongeni
