= Chris John (boxer) =

Indonesian boxer (born 1979)

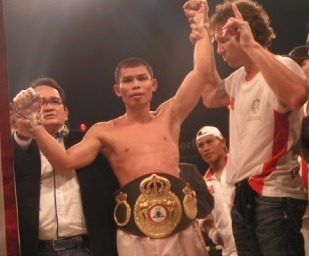
- John (center) with the WBA title

Personal information
- Nicknames: The Dragon; The Indonesian Thin Man
- Born: Yohannes Christian John; 14 September 1979 (age 46) Banjarnegara, Central Java, Indonesia
- Height: 5 ft 6 1/2 in (169 cm)
- Weight: Featherweight

Boxing career
- Reach: 69 in (175 cm)
- Stance: Orthodox

Boxing record
- Total fights: 52
- Wins: 48
- Win by KO: 22
- Losses: 1
- Draws: 3

Chris John
- Political party: NasDem Party
- Spouse: Anna Maria Megawati (m. 2005)

Yohannes Christian John (born 14 September 1979) is an Indonesian former professional boxer who competed from 1998 to 2013. He held the World Boxing Association (WBA) featherweight title from 2004 to 2009, then held the (Super version) from 2009 to 2013, with his near decade-long reign being the second longest in the division's history (after Johnny Kilbane). During his reign, John defended the title against 16 boxers, the second most in featherweight history (after Eusebio Pedroza).

Chris "The Dragon" John is the fourth Indonesian boxer to win a world title, following Ellyas Pical, Nico Thomas and Muhammad Rachman. In 2013, John announced his retirement from boxing, following his only career defeat to Simpiwe Vetyeka.

== Early life ==
Chris John was born as Yohannes Christian John in Banjarnegara, on 14 September 1979. He is the second son of four siblings of Johan Tjahjadi (real name: Tjia Foek Sem) who is of Chinese descent and Maria Warsini. Boxing has been a part of John's life since his childhood. John's father was a former amateur boxer in Indonesia. He introduced boxing to his sons, John and his younger brother Adrian, at an early age of 5. John's Father inspired him by regaling with stories of hard fought battles and triumphant victories. Given the choice to fight or pursue other sports, John chose boxing and became an amateur champion in Banjarnegara.

In 1997, Chris caught the attention of renowned boxing trainer, Sutan Rambing. Sutan recruited John into his gym and relocated John to Semarang, a city in Central Java. Sutan served as John's trainer till 2004 and soon after parted ways when John won his first major world title.

== Professional career ==
John turned professional in 1997 and was known as "Thin Man" before he proclaimed his new nickname "The Dragon" that he now uses. In his first professional fight, John won by knockout, beating a local fighter Word Kanda. In his 6th bout, the reputation of Chris John rose when he knocked out the national featherweight Champion in a 12 rounds bout, Muhammad Afaridzi. John was knocked down twice in round one, but he managed to reverse the situation by knocking Alfaridzi in round 12. According to Chris John, his nose was bleeding profusely resulting from a broken nose that occurred in the 1st round.

Following the win over Dae-Kyun Park, Chris captured the PABA Featherweight title from the. John was given the opportunity to fight hard-hitting Oscar León of Colombia for the WBA featherweight title on 26 September 2003 in Bali. John was The Ring's #8-ranked featherweight in the world (and #10 pound-for-pound), while Oscar was the #5-ranked featherweight in the world and #5 pound-for-pound. This was Oscar's second title fight in his career. His first, losing to then WBA featherweight champion Derrick Gainer in a twelve-round split-decision.

While both fighters were in their mid 20s, Oscar had several physical advantages over John: an inch in height and 5 inches in reach. John won by split decision in a 12-round match to win the WBA Featherweight title.

=== John vs. Rojas ===
After defeating Osamu Sato in Tokyo, Japan, John was given the opportunity to fight Jose Rojas of Venezuela in Tenggarong, East Kalimantan. The fight result was concluded as a technical draw because accidental head clash in round 4. John was deeply cut, and Rojas was slightly cut. Rojas entered as the challenger after Derrick Gainer refused to sign contract with the promoter.

In 2005, John split with trainer Sutan Rambing prior to Derrick Gainer Fight. Preparing for this bout Chris joined Harry's Gym in Perth, Australia, where he is currently trained and managed by Craig Christian.

Five months after the fight with Oscar, Chris went on to defend his WBA title to former champion Derrick Gainer. Heading to the bout, Derrick was favourite to take the title he lost 2 years ago to Lineal Champion Juan Manuel Marquez. It was considered to be an important fight for both men.

Despite scoring a first round knockdown, Derrick Gainer's attempt to once again win a world featherweight title failed at the Britama Arena Sport Hall in Jakarta, Indonesia. John won the match decisively by 12 round unanimous decision(118-109, 118-111, and 118-110).

=== John vs. Márquez ===
In the year of 2006, quadruple champion Juan Manuel Márquez challenged Chris for his WBA featherweight championship. Coming into the bout, Marquez fought to a draw against Manny Pacquiao.

John won by Unanimous Decision over 12 rounds. Marquez and his team disputed the decision, although all three judges scored in favour of John.

In 2012, following Marquez's upset win over Pacquiao, Chris John called him out for a second bout to be staged in Singapore or Macau in a neutral ground. "I am a much better boxer than him (Marquez) and I have more speed and skill," said John. "I will fight Marquez at any weight because it is a big money fight," John, told the Straits Times. Australian promoter Angelo Hyder said he would propose a fight at lightweight, meaning the Mexican would have to shed weight and John would have to gain about four kilograms (nine pounds). The bout never came to fruition.

=== John vs. Enoki ===
Prior to this bout, both fighters were undefeated, John standing at 41-0 and Enoki at 27-0. This was Hiroyuki Enoki first shot at a world title. A lot of hype was built up coming into the fight due to the history of world war two as Indonesia was a colony of Japan.

This fight was staged in a sold out korakuen hall in Tokyo, Japan. John took control from the outset and won unanimously by scores of 118-110, 118-110 and 117-111. This marked John's 10th world title defense.

=== John vs. Juarez ===
Following the Enoki Fight, Chris called out perennial contender Rocky Juarez. In an interview with Secondsout, John said, "I want all boxing fans to be able to see me in the ring. I just want to fight the best fighters in the world and by going to the United States, I can fight the best. I watched Rocky Juarez’ last fight with Jorge Barrios. Juarez would be a good fight for me. I am ready for him and anyone else at featherweight or super featherweight.

On February 28, 2009, the title fight materialize with Rocky Juarez in Toyota Center in Houston, Texas, which served as the main undercard for Juan Manuel Márquez vs. Juan Díaz. This was the first time he had fought on American soil. The fight was a unanimous draw after 12 competitive rounds, with all three judges scoring it 114-114.

The fight was listed in Ring Magazines 20 Biggest Robberies in the last 20 years.

=== John vs. Juarez II ===
The long-awaited rematch between Chris John and Rocky Juarez was staged in the MGM Grand Garden Arena in Las Vegas, as part of the undercard to Floyd Mayweather Jr. vs. Juan Manuel Márquez. John entered as the # 1 featherweight in the world according to The Ring Magazine. Juarez, a 2.1-1 underdog, came in as the # 4 featherweight. The bout, originally scheduled for June 27, was delayed due to a blood issue with Chris John. John had been reportedly feeling ill and fainted in training following a three-round sparring session. Tests two weeks later, however, showed no irregularities.

The rematch, the fight was one sided with John retaining his WBA title via 119-109, 117-111, 114-113, 12 round unanimous decision.

=== John vs. Yordan ===
Fellow Indonesian and leading contender Daud Yordan was next in line to fight John. The event was held in Jakarta International Expo, Kemayoran Central Jakarta on 17 April 2011.

Chris John won a unanimous decision over his challenger by scores of 117-112, 116-112, and 116-112.

=== John vs. Kimura ===
John defended his title for the 16th time on May 5, 2012, by defeating Japanese Shoji Kimura by unanimous decision. This marked his first win in Singapore and first out of his five fights contract in Marina Bay Sands.

=== John vs. Piriyapinyo ===
Chonlatarn Piriyapinyo was the second undefeated fighter to challenge for John's featherweight title. This served as his second bout in Marina Bay Sands. Billed as the "Battle of the Undefeated'. Coming into the fight, the Thai fighter was ranked 6th in the featherweight division.

Chris John successfully defended his WBA featherweight title for the 17th time on Friday in Singapore, as the Indonesian Pride beat Thailand's Chonlatarn Piriyapinyo by unanimous decision, with scores of 117-111, 119-109, and 119-109."

In the Post fight interview, Chris John called out fellow champions Daniel Ponce de León, Billy Dib and Orlando Salido from other associations for a unification bout for the featherweight belt.

=== John vs. Hosono ===
Satoshi Hosono, rated 7th by WBA in the featherweight division, became John's 6th challenger from Japan. Fighting on April 14, 2013 at the Indoor Tennis Stadium, Jakarta, Indonesia, John suffered severe bleeding from his temple and forehead due to the headbutt which happened in round 3 of 12. The fight was declared as a technical draw, and John retained his title.

=== John vs. Vetyeka ===
John lost the WBA Super World featherweight title to Simpiwe Vetyeka on December 6, 2013, when John retired on his stool after the sixth of twelve rounds. Vetyeka's IBO featherweight title was also on the line. It was John's first professional loss and brought his ten-year WBA title reign to an end. After this loss, John decided to retire from boxing. Announcing his retirement on RCTI (Indonesia) Live with trainer Craig Christian and management team of Yonathan Periatna and Tony Tolj (Australia) and Angelo Hyder. Now he runs his personal business with his wife, while filming a number of TV commercials and becoming a motivator, sometimes appearing on TV shows.

== Trainers in boxing ==
- 1984–1997: Johan Tjahjadi (John's father)
- 1997–2004: Sutan Rambing
- 2005–2013: Craig Christian

== Awards ==
John was named awarded the Fighter of the Decade for the 2000s by the WBA, in a ceremony which took place in Panama City on 29 February 2012. This award was previously held by Roy Jones Jr. for his achievements in the 1990s.

In addition to being a professional boxer, John is also a member of the national wushu team. His successful achievements as a wushu athlete include:

- Bronze medalist, South East Asian Games in Kuala Lumpur, Malaysia, 2001
- Gold medalist, South East Asian Games in Jakarta, Indonesia, 1997
- Gold medalist, Indonesian multi events games (National Olympic), Jakarta, 1996
- Gold medalist, Indonesian wushu championship

== Professional boxing record ==
52 fights	48 wins	1 loss
By knockout	22	1
By decision	26	0
Draws	3	

No.	Result	Record	Opponent	Type	Round, time	Date	Location	Notes
52	Loss	48–1–3	Simpiwe Vetyeka	RTD	6 (12), 3:00	Dec 6, 2013	Metro City, Perth, Australia	Lost WBA (Super) featherweight title; For IBO featherweight title
51	Draw	48–0–3	Satoshi Hosono	TD	3 (12)	Apr 14, 2013	Tennis Indoor Senayan, Jakarta, Indonesia	Retained WBA (Super) featherweight title; Majority TD: John cut from an accidental head clash
50	Win	48–0–2	Chonlatarn Piriyapinyo	UD	12	Nov 9, 2012	Marina Bay Sands, Singapore	Retained WBA (Super) featherweight title
49	Win	47–0–2	Shoji Kimura	UD	12	May 5, 2012	Marina Bay Sands, Singapore	Retained WBA (Super) featherweight title
48	Win	46–0–2	Stanyslav Merdov	UD	12	Nov 30, 2011	Challenge Stadium, Perth, Australia	Retained WBA (Super) featherweight title
47	Win	45–0–2	Daud Yordan	UD	12	Apr 17, 2011	International Expo, Jakarta, Indonesia	Retained WBA (Super) featherweight title
46	Win	44–0–2	David Saucedo	UD	12	Dec 5, 2010	Tennis Indoor Senayan, Jakarta, Indonesia	Retained WBA (Super) featherweight title
45	Win	43–0–2	Rocky Juarez	UD	12	Sep 19, 2009	MGM Grand Garden Arena, Paradise, Nevada, U.S.	Retained WBA (Super) featherweight title
44	Draw	42–0–2	Rocky Juarez	UD	12	Feb 28, 2009	Toyota Center, Houston, Texas, U.S.	Retained WBA featherweight title
43	Win	42–0–1	Hiroyuki Enoki	UD	12	Oct 24, 2008	Korakuen Hall, Tokyo, Japan	Retained WBA featherweight title
42	Win	41–0–1	Roinet Caballero	RTD	7 (12), 3:00	Jan 26, 2008	Gelora Bung Karno Stadium, Jakarta, Indonesia	Retained WBA featherweight title
41	Win	40–0–1	Zaiki Takemoto	RTD	9 (12), 3:00	Aug 19, 2007	Fashion Mart, Kobe, Japan	Retained WBA featherweight title
40	Win	39–0–1	Jose Rojas	UD	12	Mar 3, 2007	Gelora Bung Karno Stadium, Jakarta, Indonesia	Retained WBA featherweight title
39	Win	38–0–1	Renan Acosta	UD	12	Sep 9, 2006	Soemantri Brodjonegoro Stadium, Jakarta, Indonesia	Retained WBA featherweight title
38	Win	37–0–1	Juan Manuel Márquez	UD	12	Mar 4, 2006	Karang Melenu Sports Hall, Tenggarong, Indonesia	Retained WBA featherweight title
37	Win	36–0–1	Tommy Browne	TKO	10 (12), 0:01	Aug 7, 2005	Panthers World of Entertainment, Penrith, Australia	Retained WBA (Regular) featherweight title
36	Win	35–0–1	Derrick Gainer	UD	12	Apr 22, 2005	The BritAma Arena, Jakarta, Indonesia	Retained WBA (Regular) featherweight title
35	Draw	34–0–1	Jose Rojas	TD	4 (12), 1:41	Dec 3, 2004	Rondong Demang Stadium, Tenggarong, Indonesia	Retained WBA (Regular) featherweight title; Split TD: both boxers cut from an accidental head clash
34	Win	34–0	Osamu Sato	UD	12	Jun 4, 2004	Ariake Coliseum, Tokyo, Japan	Retained WBA (Regular) featherweight title
33	Win	33–0	Oscar León	SD	12	Sep 26, 2003	Bali, Indonesia	Won vacant WBA interim featherweight title
32	Win	32–0	Dae-Kyung Park	TKO	1 (12)	Jul 3, 2003	Indosiar Studios, Jakarta, Indonesia	Retained PABA featherweight title
31	Win	31–0	Mahasamut Kiatpakpanung	KO	3 (10)	Mar 29, 2003	Kendal, Indonesia	
30	Win	30–0	Dante Paulino	KO	8 (12)	Jan 10, 2003	Jakarta, Indonesia	Retained PABA featherweight title
29	Win	29–0	Ratanachai Sor Vorapin	UD	10	Nov 1, 2002	Semarang, Indonesia	
28	Win	28–0	Sprinkaan Khongoane	UD	10	Aug 23, 2002	Indosiar Studios, Jakarta, Indonesia	
27	Win	27–0	Dong-Kook Lee	KO	1 (12)	Jun 28, 2002	Jakarta, Indonesia	Retained PABA featherweight title
26	Win	26–0	Petcharoon Wor Surapol	TKO	5 (12)	Mar 29, 2002	Bandung, Indonesia	Retained PABA featherweight title
25	Win	25–0	Kongthawat Sorkitti	TKO	8 (12)	Jan 11, 2002	Bandung, Indonesia	Retained PABA featherweight title
24	Win	24–0	Soleh Sundava	RTD	6 (12), 3:00	Nov 9, 2001	Kaliwates Youth Arena, Jember, Indonesia	Won PABA featherweight title
23	Win	23–0	Kongthawat Sor Kitti	PTS	10	Jul 27, 2001	Karawang, Indonesia	
22	Win	22–0	Fernando Montilla	TKO	7 (10)	Apr 4, 2001	Indosiar Studios, Jakarta, Indonesia	
21	Win	21–0	Leed Shabu	KO	3 (12)	Mar 29, 2001	Bogor, Indonesia	Retained Indonesia featherweight title
20	Win	20–0	Vichit Chuwatana	PTS	10	Dec 22, 2000	Jakarta, Indonesia	
19	Win	19–0	Uygun Siddikov	KO	6 (10)	Sep 29, 2000	Jakarta, Indonesia	
18	Win	18–0	Baby Lorona Jr.	UD	10	Aug 24, 2000	Jakarta, Indonesia	
17	Win	17–0	Khongsuriya Sitkanongsak	KO	9 (10)	May 26, 2000	Jakarta, Indonesia	
16	Win	16–0	Moses Seran	KO	3 (12)	May 5, 2000	Jakarta, Indonesia	Won vacant Indonesia Boxing Association featherweight title
15	Win	15–0	Joseph Paden	KO	2 (10)	Jan 28, 2000	Jakarta, Indonesia	
14	Win	14–0	Vichit Chuwatana	KO	2 (10)	Dec 23, 1999	Semarang, Indonesia	
13	Win	13–0	Virgo Warouw	PTS	10	Nov 19, 1999	Jakarta, Indonesia	
12	Win	12–0	Muhammad Alfaridzi	KO	12 (12)	Jun 6, 1999	Indosiar Studios, Jakarta, Indonesia	Won vacant Indonesia featherweight title
11	Win	11–0	Taji Atmojo	PTS	10	Jun 6, 1999	Jakarta, Indonesia	
10	Win	10–0	Hasan Lobubun	KO	1 (8)	Apr 2, 1999	Jakarta, Indonesia	
9	Win	9–0	Hasan Ambon	PTS	10	Mar 5, 1999	Jakarta, Indonesia	
8	Win	8–0	Herry Makawimbang	PTS	10	Feb 5, 1999	Jakarta, Indonesia	
7	Win	7–0	Salim Ayuba	PTS	10	Dec 4, 1998	Jakarta, Indonesia	
6	Win	6–0	Kris Wuritimur	PTS	8	Nov 6, 1998	Tangerang, Indonesia	
5	Win	5–0	Ampi Lealesi	TKO	5 (8)	Oct 10, 1998	Tangerang, Indonesia	
4	Win	4–0	Riston Manalu	TKO	3 (8)	Sep 5, 1998	RCTI Studios, Jakarta, Indonesia	
3	Win	3–0	Guci Halim Fidal	PTS	8	Aug 5, 1998	Indosiar Studios, Jakarta, Indonesia	
2	Win	2–0	Nurdin Pase	TKO	2 (6)	Jul 6, 1998	Indosiar Studios, Jakarta, Indonesia	
1	Win	1–0	Firman Kanda	PTS	6	Jun 4, 1998	Tangerang, Indonesia	

Sporting positions
Regional boxing titles
Vacant Title last held by Mike Sianturi	Indonesia featherweight champion July 13, 1999 – May 2001; Vacated	Vacant Title next held by Joey De Ricardo
Inaugural champion	IBA featherweight champion May 5, 2000 – November 2001; Vacated	Vacant Title next held by Moses Seran
Preceded by Soleh Sundava	PABA featherweight champion November 9, 2001 – September 2003; Vacated	Vacant Title next held by Saohin Srithai Condo
World boxing titles
New title	WBA featherweight champion Interim title September 26, 2003 – November 1, 2003; Promoted	Vacant Title next held by Yuriorkis Gamboa
New title	WBA (Regular) featherweight champion November 1, 2003 – August 22, 2005; Promoted	Vacant Title next held by Yuriorkis Gamboa
Preceded by Juan Manuel Márquez as Super Champion	WBA featherweight champion August 22, 2005 – July 14, 2010; Super title from June 27, 2009; Stripped	Succeeded by Yuriorkis Gamboa as champion promoted from Regular status
Preceded by Yuriorkis Gamboa as Unified Champion	WBA featherweight champion Super title December 5, 2010 – December 6, 2013	Succeeded by Simpiwe Vetyeka
Honorary boxing titles
New title	WBA featherweight champion In recess July 14, 2010 – December 5, 2010; Reinstated	Title discontinued
