= Lorenzo Villanueva =

Filipino boxer

Personal information
- Nickname: Thunderbolt
- Nationality: (Philippines) Filipino
- Born: Lorenzo G. Villanueva; November 11, 1985 (age 40) Midsayap, Cotabato (del Norte), Philippines
- Height: 5 ft 7 in (1.70 m)
- Weight: Featherweight

Boxing career
- Stance: Southpaw

Boxing record
- Total fights: 37
- Wins: 33
- Win by KO: 29
- Losses: 3
- Draws: 0
- No contests: 1

Lorenzo G. Villanueva, (born November 11, 1985) is a Filipino professional boxer in the Featherweight class. He is trained by famed trainer Freddie Roach.

== Boxing career ==
Villanueva turned professional in 2007.

In 2009, Villanueva won the WBO Oriental featherweight title by stopping previously unbeaten Eric Canoy in the 10th round.

His first fight in the United States was supposed to be on November 12, 2011, on the Manny Pacquiao vs. Juan Manuel Marquez III undercard against an undecided opponent. However visa issues prevented Villanueva from participating in the event.

On May 5, 2012, he suffered his first defeat, after being knocked-out in round 2 by Indonesian's Daud Yordan held at Marina Bay Sands, Singapore for the vacant International Boxing Organization Featherweight title.

== Professional boxing record ==
37 fights	33 wins	3 losses
By knockout	29	3
By decision	3	0
By disqualification	1	0
No contests	1	

No.	Result	Record	Opponent	Type	Round, Time	Date	Location	Notes
37	Loss	33–3 (1)	Masayuki Ito	TKO	9 (12) 1:40	13 Apr 2017	Korakuen Hall, Tokyo, Japan	For WBO Asia Pacific super featherweight title
36	Win	33–2 (1)	Richard Betos	RTD	4 (8) 3:00	23 Dec 2016	Almendras Gym, Davao City, Philippines	
35	Win	32–2 (1)	Jovany Rota	KO	7 (10) 1:18	15 Oct 2016	Pigkawayan, Cotabato del Norte, Philippines	
34	Win	31–2 (1)	Eusebio Baluarte	TKO	3 (8)	27 Aug 2016	Kidapawan City Gymnasium, Barangay Amas, Kidapawan City, Philippines	
33	Loss	30–2 (1)	Jerry Castroverde	TKO	5 (10)	12 Dec 2015	Almendras Gym, Davao City, Philippines	
32	Win	30–1 (1)	Hagibis Quinones	KO	1 (10) 0:34	26 Jun 2015	Davao City Recreational Center (Almendras Gym), Davao City, Philippines	
31	Win	29–1 (1)	Jaime Barcelona	UD	8	8 Dec 2014	M'lang, Cotabato del Norte, Philippines	
30	Win	28–1 (1)	Gadwin Tubigon	TKO	9 (10) 0:38	11 Oct 2014	Davao City Recreational Center (Almendras Gym), Davao City, Philippines	Stoppage win for Villanueva after Tubigon was declared unfit to continue with a broken nose
29	Win	27–1 (1)	Hendrik Barongsay	KO	1 (10) 2:20	28 Jun 2014	Almendras Gym, Davao City, Philippines	
28	Win	26–1 (1)	Alvin Makiling	UD	10	11 Sep 2013	Plaridel Municipal Gymnasium, Plaridel, Philippines	
27	Win	25–1 (1)	Ruben Santillanosa	TKO	2 (6)	4 Aug 2013	M'lang Municipal Gymnasium, M'lang, Philippinesa	
26	Win	24–1 (1)	Sonny Gonzalez	DQ	6 (10) 0:55	12 Aug 2012	Magpet, Cotabato del Norte, Philippines	
25	Loss	23–1 (1)	Daud Yordan	KO	2 (12) 1:06	5 May 2012	Marina Bay Sands Hotel, Singapore	For vacant IBO featherweight title
24	Win	23–0 (1)	Diego Ledesma	KO	1 (10) 1:17	28 Jan 2012	Waterfront Cebu City Hotel & Casino, Barangay Lahug, Cebu City, Philippines	
23	Win	22–0 (1)	Jaime Acerda	KO	1 (10) 1:27	4 Dec 2011	M'lang, Cotabato del Norte, Philippines	
22	Win	21–0 (1)	Eddy Comaro	KO	1 (10) 1:02	30 Jul 2011	Hoops Dome, Lapu-Lapu City, Philippines	
21	Win	20–0 (1)	James Mokoginta	KO	5 (12) 2:14	9 Apr 2011	University of St. La Salle Coliseum, Bacolod City, Philippines	Retained WBO Oriental featherweight title
20	Win	19–0 (1)	Ruben Santillanosa	TKO	2 (8) 0:19	26 Feb 2011	Lagao Gym, General Snatos City, Philippines	
19	Win	18–0 (1)	Balweg Bangoyan	RTD	6 (12) 3:00	1 Aug 2010	M'lang Municipal Gymnasium, M'lang, Philippines	Retained WBO Oriental featherweight title
18	Win	17–0 (1)	Eric Macas	KO	2 (12) 2:23	14 Feb 2010	M'lang Municipal Plaza, M'lang, Philippines	Retained WBO Oriental featherweight title
17	Win	16–0 (1)	Jaime Barcelona	UD	10	26 Sep 2009	Midsayap, Cotabato del Norte, Philippines	
16	Win	15–0 (1)	Eric Canoy	TKO	2 (12) 2:33	4 Jul 2009	Midsayap Municipal Gym, Barangay Poblacion 6, Philippines	Won WBO Oriental featherweight title
15	NC-ND	14–0 (1)	Eric Macas	NC-ND	5 (10) 2:45	23 May 2009	Medina Gymnasium, Barangay Maningcol, Ozamiz City, Philippines	Previously ruled as a 5th Round TKO victory for Eric Macas. The GAB decided on June 19, 2009 to declare the fight a No Decision, after a careful scrutiny of the affidavits of the persons concerned as well as the review of the recorded video of the fight.
14	Win	14–0	Viratnoi Sithsoei	TKO	2 (8) 2:51	25 Apr 2009	Cebu Coliseum, Cebu City, Philippines	
13	Win	13–0	Joy Pol	KO	2 (6) 1:56	21 Feb 2009	Cebu Coliseum, Cebu City, Philippines	
12	Win	12–0	Felipe Jun Dimecillo	TKO	2 (10) 0:45	10 Jan 2009	Makilala, Cotabato del Norte, Philippines	
11	Win	11–0	Jun Pader	KO	1 (10) 1:02	20 Dec 2008	M'lang, Cotabato del Norte, Philippines	
10	Win	10–0	Sommai Suksawaeng	KO	3 (10) 0:48	25 Nov 2008	Midsayap Municipal Gym, Barangay Poblacion 6, Midsayap, Philippines	
9	Win	9–0	Big M or Boonchuay	TKO	1 (8) 2:31	9 Aug 2008	Magpet Municipal Gym, Magpet, Philippines	
8	Win	8–0	Rico Genon	TKO	2 (10) 1:36	21 Jun 2008	Midsayap Municipal Gym, Barangay Poblacion 6, Midsayap, Philippines	
7	Win	7–0	Arnold Montojo	TKO	2 (8) 2:41	12 Apr 2008	Municipal Gymnasium, Pigkawayan, Philippines	
6	Win	6–0	Marlon Mangubat	TKO	3 (6) 0:45	19 Jan 2008	Midsayap, Cotabato del Norte, Philippines	
5	Win	5–0	Danilo Logramonte	KO	1 (6) 1:42	29 Sep 2007	M'lang, Cotabato del Norte, Philippines	
4	Win	4–0	Kid Pamatian	KO	2 (6) 0:35	10 Aug 2007	Magpet Municipal Gym, Magpet, Philippines	
3	Win	3–0	Joefrey Mara mara	TKO	1 (4) 0:48	30 Jun 2007	Barangay Amas, Kidapawan City, Philippines	
2	Win	2–0	Arnel Abellanosa	TKO	1 (4) 2:24	28 Apr 2007	Kidapawa City, Cotabato del Norte, Philippines	
1	Win	1–0	Lloyd Malinao	KO	1 (4) 1:23	20 Jan 2007	Notre Dame of Midsayap College Gym, Midsayap, Philippines	
