= Hiroyuki Enoki =

Japanese boxer

Personal information
- Nationality: Japanese (Japan)
- Born: Hiroyuki Enoki; 14 September 1979 (age 46) Tegatayama Nakamachi, Akita, Akita, Japan
- Weight: Featherweight

Boxing career
- Stance: orthodox

Boxing record
- Total fights: 34
- Wins: 28
- Win by KO: 20
- Losses: 4
- Draws: 2

Hiroyuki Enoki (榎 洋之 Enoki Hiroyuki, born 14 September 1979 in Akita, Akita, Japan) is a Japanese former professional boxer who fights at featherweight and is the former Japanese and OPBF featherweight champion.

== Professional career ==
Enoki turned professional in August 1998 in Yokohama, Japan. In his debut Enoki defeated fellow Japanese debutant Koyu Nakajima with a first round knockout.

After twenty-one unbeaten fights Enoki beat Akinori Kanai for the Japanese featherweight title in January 2005.

Enoki challenged WBA featherweight champion, Chris John of Indonesia, October 24, 2008 at Korakuen Hall, Tokyo, Japan for a chance to win the world title, but finally lost the fight unanimously by scores of 110–118, 110-118 and 111–117.

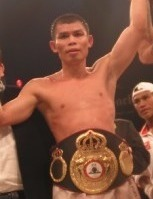
Indonesia's John

== Professional boxing record ==
34 fights	28 wins	4 losses
By knockout	20	1
By decision	8	3
Draws	2	

Result	Record	Opponent	Type	Round	Date	Location	Notes
Loss	28-4-2	(Mexico) Alberto Garza	TKO	9 (10), 0:58	2010-04-23	(Japan) Korakuen Hall, Bunkyō, Tokyo	
Loss	28-3-2	(Japan) Satoshi Hosono	UD	10	2009-10-10	(Japan) Yoyogi #2 Gymnasium, Tokyo	For OPBF Feather Title
Loss	28-2-2	(North Korea) Lee Ryol-li	SD	10	2009-07-18	(Japan) Korakuen Hall, Bunkyō, Tokyo	
Win	28-1-2	(Indonesia) Ardi Diego	KO	3 (10), 3:06	2009-03-07	(Japan) Korakuen Hall, Bunkyō, Tokyo	
Loss	27-1-2	(Indonesia) Chris John	UD	12	2008-10-24	(Japan) Korakuen Hall, Bunkyō, Tokyo	For World Boxing Association World Feather Title
Draw	27-0-2	(Japan) Takahiro Ao	PTS	12	2008-04-05	(Japan) JCB Hall, Tokyo	Retained Japanese and OBPF featherweight titles
Win	27-0-1	(Japan) Makyo Sugita	UD	12	2007-09-15	(Japan) Korakuen Hall, Bunkyō, Tokyo	Retained OBPF featherweight title
Win	26-0-1	(Thailand) Achhan Buahom	KO	6 (10), 0:31	2007-02-17	(Japan) Korakuen Hall, Bunkyō, Tokyo	
Win	25-0-1	(Australia) Nedal Hussein	UD	12	2006-09-16	(Japan) Korakuen Hall, Bunkyō, Tokyo	Retained OPBF Feather Title
Win	24-0-1	(Thailand) Dentaksin Noinai Sportschool	KO	2 (12), 1:22	2006-01-21	(Japan) Korakuen Hall, Bunkyō, Tokyo	Won OPBF Feather Title
Win	23-0-1	(Japan) Koji Umetsu	UD	10	2005-09-22	(Japan) Akita City Gymnasium, Akita	Retained Japanese Feather Title
Win	22-0-1	(South Korea) Zaiki Takemoto	UD	10	2005-04-02	(Japan) Korakuen Hall, Bunkyō, Tokyo	Retained Japanese Feather Title
Win	21-0-1	(Japan) Akinori Kanai	TKO	7 (10), 1:35	2005-01-08	(Japan) Korakuen Hall, Bunkyō, Tokyo	Retained Japanese Feather Title
Win	20-0-1	(Japan) Dainoshin Kuma	TKO	9 (10), 1:56	2004-09-04	(Japan) Korakuen Hall, Bunkyō, Tokyo	Won Japanese Feather Title
Win	19-0-1	(Japan) Seiji Funami	TKO	8 (10), 2:01	2004-03-20	(Japan) Korakuen Hall, Bunkyō, Tokyo	
Win	18-0-1	(Thailand) Anurak Tamachard	KO	4 (10), 2:42	2003-12-10	(Japan) Korakuen Hall, Bunkyō, Tokyo	
Win	17-0-1	(Japan) Goji Mukai	TKO	5 (10), 1:06	2003-07-19	(Japan) Korakuen Hall, Bunkyō, Tokyo	
Win	16-0-1	(Thailand) Chole Sithgorson	KO	2 (10), 0:30	2002-12-21	(Japan) Korakuen Hall, Bunkyō, Tokyo	
Win	15-0-1	(Japan) Masatomi Suzuki	TKO	6 (10), 1:56	2002-07-06	(Japan) Korakuen Hall, Bunkyō, Tokyo	
Win	14-0-1	(Japan) Yoshio Hattori	TKO	5 (10), 2:48	2002-04-03	(Japan) Korakuen Hall, Bunkyō, Tokyo	
Draw	13-0-1	(South Korea) Jae Kwang Jung	PTS	10	2001-11-17	(Japan) Korakuen Hall, Bunkyō, Tokyo	
Win	13-0	(Japan) Tomoyuki Kusama	PTS	10	2001-06-02	(Japan) Korakuen Hall, Bunkyō, Tokyo	
Win	12-0	(Thailand) Siengthip Sitsyasei	KO	1 (10), 1:51	2001-01-06	(Japan) Korakuen Hall, Bunkyō, Tokyo	
Win	11-0	(Japan) Naoya Hirahara	PTS	8	2000-10-20	(Japan) Korakuen Hall, Bunkyō, Tokyo	
Win	10-0	(Japan) Shigeo Hori	PTS	6	2000-08-31	(Japan) Korakuen Hall, Bunkyō, Tokyo	
Win	9-0	(Japan) Kanta Someya	TKO	5 (6), 1:25	2000-07-14	(Japan) Korakuen Hall, Bunkyō, Tokyo	
Win	8-0	(Japan) Kanta Someya	TKO	4 (6), 2:25	1999-10-22	(Japan) Korakuen Hall, Bunkyō, Tokyo	
Win	7-0	(Japan) Naohisa Masuda	TKO	5 (5), 2:12	1999-08-30	(Japan) Korakuen Hall, Bunkyō, Tokyo	
Win	6-0	(Japan) Yoichi Matsumoto	TKO	5 (5), 0:52	1999-07-26	(Japan) Korakuen Hall, Bunkyō, Tokyo	
Win	5-0	(South Korea) Zaiki Takemoto	PTS	5	1999-06-22	(Japan) Korakuen Hall, Bunkyō, Tokyo	
Win	4-0	(Japan) Takashi Nishihara	KO	1 (5), 1:39	1999-05-08	(Japan) Korakuen Hall, Bunkyō, Tokyo	
Win	3-0	(Japan) Kiyoshi Watanabe	KO	1 (8), 3:01	1999-03-20	(Japan) Korakuen Hall, Bunkyō, Tokyo	
Win	2-0	(Japan) Takashi Nishihara	TKO	1 (6), 1:54	1999-01-09	(Japan) Korakuen Hall, Bunkyō, Tokyo	
Win	1-0	(Japan) Koyu Nakajima	TKO	1 (4), 1:20	1998-08-23	(Japan) Yokohama Arena, Yokohama	

== TV series appearances ==
Enoki made appearances in NHK TV series, "Watashi no Aozora" in 2000.

== Kanano alumni ==
A former professional sumo wrestler, Takekaze Akira is his classmate at Kanaashi Agricultural High School.

== Personal life ==
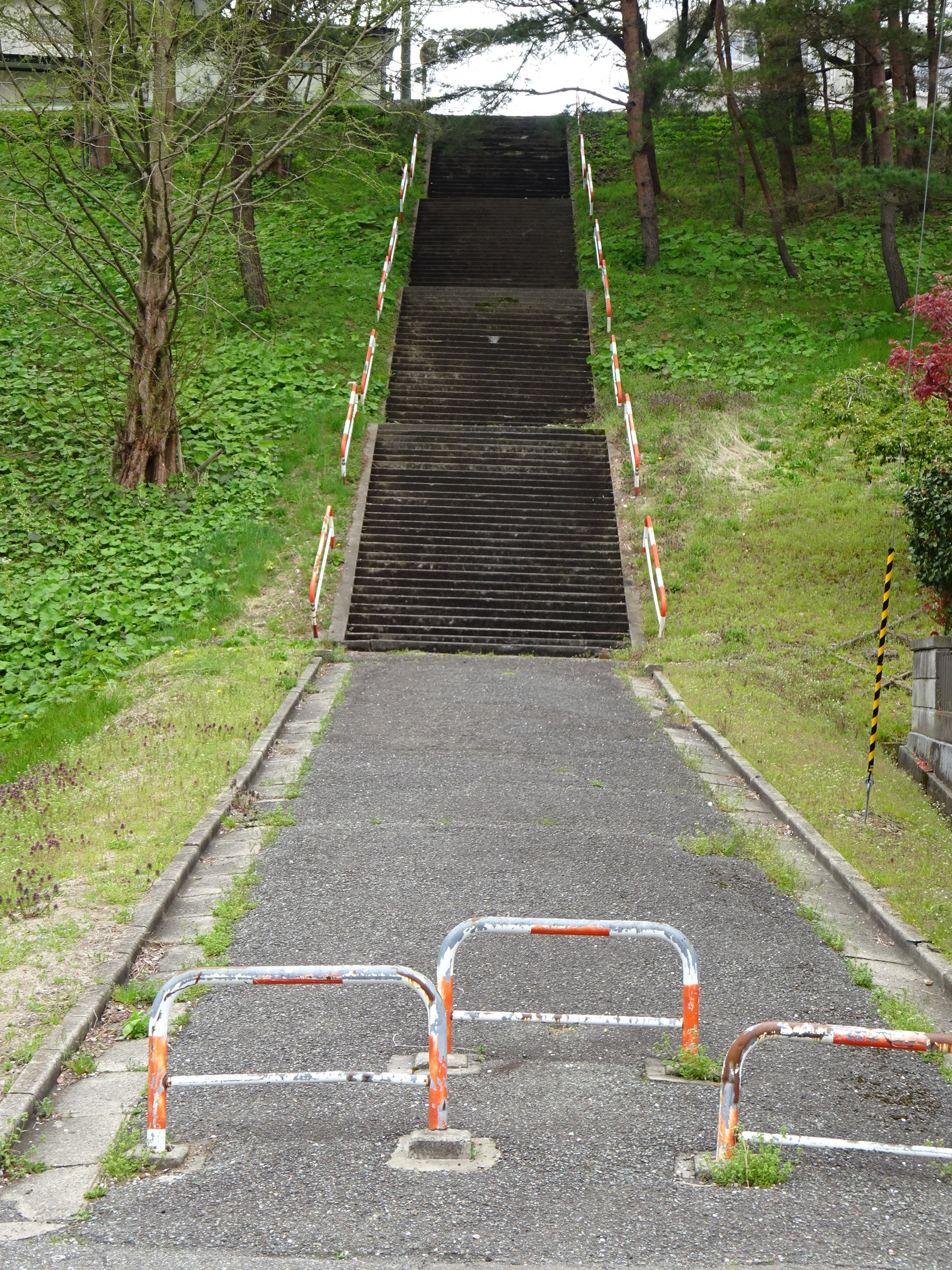
His stairs workout place in Tegatayama Nakamachi, Akita City (39°43′51.9″N 140°08′33.8″E)

He was born and raised in Tegatayama Nakamachi, Akita, and attended Hiroomote Elementary School and Joto Junior High School. He has an older brother, and their father died in the 2010s.
