= Stevie Van Zandt: Disciple =

2024 biographical documentary film

- Film poster
- Directed by: Bill Teck
- Produced by: Bill Teck; David Fisher; Robert Cotto
- Cinematography: David Fisher
- Edited by: Lara Fox; Jesse Spencer
- Production companies: HBO Documentary Films; Tones & Chords
- Distributed by: Max
- Release date: June 8, 2024 (Tribeca Festival)
- Running time: 147 minutes
- Country: United States
- Language: English

Stevie Van Zandt: Disciple is a 2024 American documentary film on the life and career of Steven Van Zandt as an actor, musician and activist. The film is directed and produced by Bill Teck. It follows Van Zandt's career from Asbury Park, New Jersey clubs to stadiums to starring as Silvio Dante in The Sopranos. The film includes interviews with Bruce Springsteen, Darlene Love, Eddie Vedder, Paul McCartney, Southside Johnny, Jackson Browne, Jimmy Iovine, and Bono.

== Reception ==
On the review aggregator website Rotten Tomatoes, 90% of 10 critics' reviews are positive, with an average rating of 7.4/10.

Richard Roeper of the Chicago Sun-Times gave the film three out of four stars and wrote that it is "comprehensive, entertaining and star-studded".
