= Generation Ñ =

Latino demographic in North America

- Origin: 1990s, Miami, Florida
- Context: Hispanic and Latino Americans; Cuban Americans; Generation X; Spanglish
- Meaning: English-dominant or bilingual, bicultural Latinos in North America

Generation Ñ (pronounced en-ye, after the Spanish letter ⟨ñ⟩) is a cultural identifier used in journalism, scholarship, and marketing to describe English-dominant or bilingual, bicultural Latinos, particularly those raised in the United States or Canada who maintain strong ties to their Hispanic heritage. The label originated in the 1990s and is widely attributed to Miami-based publisher and filmmaker Bill Teck, who trademarked it as generation ñ and used it as both a cultural identifier and a media brand. It is also styled Generation N. (Note: Some sources write the term as Generation N (without the tilde) while still indicating the ñ pronunciation and symbolic meaning.)

== See also ==
- Ñ
- Spanglish
- Hispanic and Latino Americans
- Cuban Americans
