= Scott Quigg =

English boxer (born 1988)

Personal information
- Nationality: British
- Born: 9 October 1988 (age 38) Bury, Greater Manchester, England
- Height: 5 ft 8 in (173 cm)
- Weight: Super-bantamweight; Featherweight

Boxing career
- Reach: 67 in (170 cm)
- Stance: Orthodox

Boxing record
- Total fights: 40
- Wins: 35
- Win by KO: 26
- Losses: 3
- Draws: 2

Scott Quigg (born 9 October 1988) is a British former professional boxer who competed from 2007 to 2020. He held the World Boxing Association super-bantamweight title (Regular version) from 2013 to 2016, and the British super-bantamweight title from 2011 to 2012.

== Early life ==
Quigg started his fight career as a child practising Muay Thai boxing at GFC Muay Thai in Bury. After receiving a lot of attention and being tipped as a future champion in the sport, Quigg had one adult fight at professional rules in Muay Thai scoring a win, before taking the decision to change disciplines and focus his talents towards amateur boxing.

== Professional career ==
=== Super-bantamweight ===
==== Early career ====
Quigg's professional debut came at the age of 18 on 21 April 2007 with a victory over Gary Shiel at the Jarvis Hotel in Manchester. Throughout the rest of the year he won on four more occasions giving him a record of 5–0 at the end of 2007. Quigg fought six more times in 2008, winning on each occasion, a run that included a victory over Ghana's tough journeyman Sumaila Badu in just the first round of a four-round contest. Watching the contest Boxing News reporter Danny Flexen claimed that after watching over 50 live shows he had "never seen a more complete prospect " with less than 10 fights under his belt.

Quigg remained unbeaten with a further five victories on Hatton Promotions bills in 2009. In his last fight of the year on 27 November Quigg met and stopped the former Ukrainian national champion and former European title challenger Yuriy Voronin in the sixth round of an 8-round fight at the Robin Park Centre in Wigan.

In 2010 Quigg defeated journeyman Nikita Lukin in Stoke on 19 February and then went on to meet Andrey Kostin in his home town of Bury on 29 May. The victory over Kostin was particularly notable in that it was the first time a professional contest had been held in the town since the local council banned the sport 13 years previously, lifting the ban only so that Quigg could compete in his home town. The ban was from 1997 after Mike Tyson bit Evander Hoyfield's ear in the rematch. The fight was also notable for Quigg's ring walk. Before his entrance, the fans in attendance were directed towards the big screen, which was a live feed recording outside Quigg's mother's house, where Quigg was staying at the time. He then came out of the house and began the walk to the Castle Sports Centre, which was 'around the corner'. Quigg's homecoming didn't last too long as he triumphed with a stoppage over his Russian opponent in just one round and in front of 1200 fans saying after the fight that "this was one of the best days of my life".

Quigg fought a British title eliminator against tough Scotsman Gavin Reid in his next fight on 16 July 2010. The fight at the Bolton Arena resulted in a 9th round stoppage win for Quigg against a man who had previously gone the distance in a challenge for the Scottish national title.

==== Regional and domestic success ====
On 25 September 2010 Quigg returned to the Castle Leisure Centre in Bury to compete for the WBA Inter-Continental title against Argentinian boxer Santiago Allione stopping him in the third round. He defended his title on 26 November 2010 at the Reebok Stadium in Bolton on the undercard of Matthew Hatton's European title defence against Roberto Belge. His opponent, the experienced Frenchman Daniel Kodjo Sassou had won the IBF International title in his last fight against Arsen Martirosyan. Quigg managed to put Sassou down in the 7th round before running out a unanimous points winner over 12 rounds.

Quigg defeated Venezuela's Franklin Varela via a 7th round stoppage in his second defence on 23 July 2011, and was ranked fourth in the WBA.

On 22 October 2011 Quigg defeated Jason Booth (36–7, 15 KOs) to win the British Super-Bantamweight title at the Castle Leisure Centre in Bury. After a one-sided contest Booth retired at the end of the seventh round.

On 4 February 2012, Quigg made the first defence of his title, beating the rugged veteran Jamie Arthur (18–5, 4 KOs) in an eighth-round stoppage, despite being put on the canvas in the fourth.

==== Quigg vs. Munroe I, ll ====
On 16 June 2012 at the Velodrome in Manchester, Quigg faced rival English Super-Bantamweight Rendall Munroe (24–2, 10 KOs) for the Interim WBA Super-Bantamweight Title. Munroe was badly cut over the right eye from an accidental head clash in the third round. With the fight having to be stopped, it went to the scorecards resulting in a Technical Draw with neither man getting a win or a loss on their record, bringing a very big domestic clash to an extremely anticlimactic ending.

The rematch of this highly waited showdown against Rendall Munroe (24–2–1, 10 KOs) was made for the undercard of Ricky Hatton's comeback fight at the Manchester Arena on 24 November, the fight took place at a venue which had sold out within six hours of tickets being released. Munroe came out strong in the first, winning it clearly with fast punches and a higher work rate. After the first, however, Quigg upped it and was landing hard to the body with both rights and lefts round after round. By the sixth Munroe was surely feeling it and it showed as he went down twice. The second time the fight was stopped with no complaints from Munroe. After this fight Quigg was promoted to WBA Regular Champion.

Quigg fought at the Bolton Arena on 29 June 2013 against Brazilian Willian Prado (21–3–1, 14 KOs) at Featherweight in a scheduled 10 round bout. Quigg won the fight in round 3 after 2 minutes and 31 seconds by knockout.

==== Quigg vs. Salinas, Silva ====
It was announced on 17 July that Quigg would fight undefeated Cuban Yoandris Salinas (20–0–1, 13 KOs) for the WBA (Regular) super-bantamweight title. The fight took place at the O2 Arena in London on 5 October 2013. Salinas started strongly, however Quigg stepped up his tempo midway through the bout and took control, giving Salinas a torrid finish to the fight. The fight went full 12 rounds as the scorecards declared it a majority draw. Two of the judges had it 114–114 and the other awarded it to Quigg 115–113. Quigg told Sky Sports that he felt he won the fight by at least 2 rounds.

On 7 November it was announced that Quigg would defend his title against #13 WBO fringe contender Diego Silva (29–2–4, 15 KOs) on 23 November on the undercard of Carl Froch vs. George Groves at the Phones 4U Arena in Manchester, UK. Quigg told Sky Sports "He [Silva] is a big threat. He is a totally different style to Yoandris Salinas. He is very unorthodox, which means you can't read him. He doesn't know what he is going to do next." Many believed this he was a downgrade opponent for Quigg. On fight night, Quigg swiftly defended his WBA title against Silva with a second-round knockout. Quigg floored Silva with a thumping right upper cut and sealed it with a right hook. He needed only one minute and 41 seconds of the second round to complete victory and extend his unbeaten professional record to 27 wins in 29 bouts with his 20th knockout.

==== Quigg vs. Munyai, Jamoye ====
Quigg returned to the Phones 4U Arena on 19 April 2014 to defend his world title against South African Tshifhiwa Munyai (24–2–1, 12 KOs). Quigg had been due to take on interim WBA champion Nehomar Cermeno (22–5–1, 13 KOs), but he had to withdraw because of visa problems. Quigg successfully defended his title for the third time with a second-round stoppage of Munyai. Munyai was knocked down with a left hook in the first round before Quigg struck with a right in the second. Quigg showed destructive power to twice floor Munyai before referee Howard Foster intervened with Munyai on the ropes.

On 26 August it was announced that Quigg will be making the fourth defence of his title at the Phones 4u Arena on 13 September against former world title challenger Stephane Jamoye (26–5, 16 KOs). The packed undercard courtesy of Matchroom Boxing included Manchester lightweight Anthony Crolla and Olympic super-heavyweight champion Anthony Joshua. Quigg seemed to size up Jamoye and waited until the closing minutes before unleashing crunching body shots that sent Jamoye into reverse. In round 3, three stiff punches forced Jamoye to retreat to the ropes and a huge body shot then sent him to the canvas, although Jamoye got back to his feet, referee Terry O'Connor stopped the fight. With this win Quigg was still on course for a super-bantamweight showdown with Carl Frampton, who took the IBF belt from Kiko Martinez the weekend earlier. Quigg also called out WBC champion Leo Santa Cruz.

==== Quigg vs. Otake, Martínez ====
Quigg made his fifth title defence against Hidenori Othake (22–1, 9 KOs) at the sold out Echo Arena in Liverpool on the undercard of Cleverly v Bellew II on 22 November 2014 live on Sky Sports Box Office. Otake was looking make history, bidding to become the first Japanese boxer to win a world title in the UK. This would only be the second time in boxing history that a Japanese boxer has come to England to challenge for the World title, the first was Mitsunori Seki, who was stopped in nine rounds by Howard Winstone in 1968 for the vacant WBC featherweight crown. Despite sustaining a large cut to the right eyebrow, Otake was able to take the bout to the full 12 rounds. The judges scored it (119–109 119–109 118–110) all in favour of Quigg.

It was announced that Quigg would be making a sixth defence of his WBA Regular title by taking on experienced Spaniard Kiko Martinez (32–5, 24 KOs) on 18 July at the Manchester Arena. Martinez had recently lost the IBF crown to Frampton last September. Quigg struggled in the first round but floored Martinez in the second with a fierce uppercut and followed up with a further barrage until referee Terry O'Connor intervened, retaining his world title in the process.

==== Quigg vs. Frampton ====
On 27 October 2015, the long-awaited fight between Quigg and IBF super-bantamweight champion Carl Frampton (21–0, 14 KOs) was being discussed according to both sides. The bout would be the biggest British fight since Froch vs. Groves in 2014. According to multiple sources a few days later, a deal was finalised and a date in early 2016 was talked about. Although the promoters said the fight was a super-bantamweight unification, it was not officially sanctioned as one. This was due to Quigg holding the WBA (regular) title. Cuban boxer Guillermo Rigondeaux (16–0, 10 KOs) was officially recognised as the (super) champion by the WBA. It was believed that Frampton aligning with boxing manager and advisor Al Haymon may have helped get the deal across the line, due to the close relationship between him and Quigg's promoter Eddie Hearn. The fight was discussed at the start on 2015. Quigg not accepting 60–40 in Frampton's favour was one of the reasons it did not happen. Hearn's response to this was the winner would take 60%. Barry McGuigan felt this was unfair to the fighters. He also claimed Quigg had never headlined a fight, whereas Frampton had sold out 16,000 arena shows in Belfast. Frampton was offered a £1.5 million take it or leave it.

On 2 November, the fight was officially announced to take place at the Phones4U Arena in Manchester on 27 February 2016, billed for the IBF and WBA super-bantamweight titles, on Sky Sports Box-Office. Both boxers spoke excitedly about the fight. Frampton discredited Quigg's title, saying only his IBF belt was at stake. Frampton said, "I'm delighted that we have finally got this fight signed. his is the fight everyone has wanted for years, none more so than myself. I'm the legitimate champion and I'm going to his backyard to defend my title because that's what champions do. Fans will find out who the real champion is, I'm going to win this fight in style." Speaking on the fight, Quigg said, "I've finally got the fight I've wanted for so long. February 27 will be the best night of my life. I've dedicated my life to this sport and I have never been more confident going into a fight, I know I will beat him in every department. This is a great fight for the sport and I'm delighted to bring it to Manchester and unify the division." On 26 January, Showtime Sports picked up the TV rights to broadcast the fight in the USA. The fight would be broadcast live, ahead of the Showtime Championship Boxing telecast of Léo Santa Cruz vs. Kiko Martinez.

Frampton believed Quigg finally took the fight on the back of his own fight, where he was dropped in round one against Alejandro Gonzalez Jr. but won the fight via decision. Frampton called it a blessing in disguise. Frampton said he had been calling for a fight against Quigg since he was British champion four years ago. The IBF formally sanctioned the bout as a unification only on the condition that the winner of the bout would have 90 days to agree a deal with mandatory challenger, Japanese boxer Shingo Wake. On the other hand, the WBA Championships Committee announced Rigondeaux as 'champion in recess', due to his managerial and promotional issues and not having a fight scheduled. The WBA made it clear that they wanted the winner of Frampton vs. Quigg to fight Rigondeaux before 27 July 2016. In the case of a draw, it would be Quigg vs. Rigondeaux. Frampton and Quigg both appeared in media conferences and said they were both open to fighting Rigondeaux, also acknowledging IBF's request to fight Wake. Ahead of his UK debut, Rigondeaux said he was open to returning to the UK to fight the winner. The fight was also going to be closely watched by featherweight champion, Santa Cruz. He was aware the bout would likely be both boxers last at super-bantamweight and said he was looking forward to them stepping up weight to challenge him.

Frampton and Quigg both weighed in at the arena in front of 3,000 fans on the Friday. Frampton had support from the traveling Irish fans, who made their presence known. Quigg weighed 121.6 pounds and Frampton weighed 121.7 pounds. There was a tense stare down during the face-off with neither fighter breaking eye-contact which last around the minute mark. It was eventually by Frampton who blew Quigg a kiss, then turned to face the crowd. Joe Gallagher and Shane McGuigan, the trainers of Quigg and Frampton, respectively, also had a stare down and small tussle at the weigh in. Later that day, it came to light that Frampton made a request for the Sky Sports broadcast team to not include an individual. No names were mentioned, however Frampton made it known in the past, person in question had been critical of them. The bookmakers had Frampton as a slight favourite going into the fight. There was still tension heading into fight night due to both boxers wanting the bigger dressing room. Quigg believed he should have the bigger room due to being the home fighter and Frampton fought his case due to being the bigger draw in the fight. There was reports to suggest Frampton could pull out of the fight. Quigg claimed it wasn't an issue for him and that he'd get dressed at his house in Bury if it meant the fight would still take place. Eddie Hearn also claimed that they had to agree to multiple demands from team Frampton in order to get the fight over the line from having Frampton's name on the left side of the poster, to having American judges and entering the ring second. Frampton would liked to decided by flipping a coin or doing 'rock, paper, scissors'.

In a close fight, in front of a 20,000 sell-out crowd, Quigg suffered his first professional loss, via split decision. Frampton was in full control of the first half of the fight, during which Quigg simply could not find his range. Quigg finally came alive in the last half as the contest turned into a desperate tussle, but Frampton gave as good as he got. Levi Martinez scored it 115–113 for Quigg, while Carlos Sucre and Dave Parris scored it 116–112 in Frampton's favour. This was Quigg's first defeat in 34 professional fights, stretching back to 2007. Although there was no rematch clause in the contract, there was a verbal agreement that they would do it all again in Belfast if the first fight warranted it. The fight was criticised for the lack of action. The CompuBox also supported this, showing that Frampton landed 83 of his 592 punches thrown (14%) and Quigg landed 85 of his 322 thrown (26.4%). It showed that no power punches were landed by either in the opening 3 rounds. According to Hearn, the PPV did 220,000 buys at box office.

In the post-fight, Frampton said, "I couldn't believe what was going on when I heard the split decision – I felt I was a comfortable winner – but it's onwards and upwards for me now. I knew it was going to be a tactical fight all along and a bit timid. I'm not going to rush into silly punches. You have to be smart. I was and I got the win. He's a solid puncher […] I think both of us are and that is why it was so cautious early on. But he never really rocked me." Quigg broke his jaw during the fight, which was caused by an uppercut. He underwent surgery the following day and said he would like a rematch. Frampton entered Quigg's dressing room after the fight, showing respect between the teams.

After the fight, Frampton claimed Quigg has little chance of a rematch because their fight was boring and Quigg was so negative in dropping a split decision. Instead stating he would like to move up to featherweight and challenge Leo Santa Cruz in the US. On 10 September 2016, Quigg announced his return to training. In October that year, his trainer Joe Gallagher discussed Quigg’s planned return on the undercard of Anthony Joshua in an interview with World Boxing News.

=== Featherweight ===
After recovering from the jaw injury he sustained against Frampton, Quigg announced, like Frampton, he would be moving up to the featherweight division, where he would also pursue a rematch at some point in the future. His trainer Joe Gallagher confirmed Quigg would return to the ring on 10 December 2016 on the undercard of Anthony Joshua vs. Éric Molina. Although an opponent was yet to be announced, Quigg said he wanted to fight the big names of the division.

==== Miscellaneous fights ====
On 24 November 2016, Mexican boxer Jose Cayetano (20–4, 9 KOs) was confirmed as Quigg's opponent at the Manchester Arena on 10 December. The fight would also be for the WBA International Featherweight title. Cayetano made weight at second attempt. Quigg stopped Cayetano in the 9th round in his debut at featherweight, dropping Cayetano with a right hand to the head in the 9th. Terry O'Connor stopped the fight immediately, as Cayetano was too hurt to get up and resume fighting. The official time of the stoppage was at 1:23 of round 9.

On 20 February 2017, Quigg announced that he had parted ways with long time trainer Joe Gallagher. He confirmed he would be travelling to the United States to train with hall of famer Freddie Roach at the Wild Card gym in Los Angeles. "I have moved up to featherweight with the goal of becoming a two-weight world champion. I need a fresh challenge to help me grow," Quigg said. Quigg had been training with Gallagher for six years.

Quigg against 35-year-old Romanian boxer Viorel Simion (21–1, 9 KOs) was the first bout added to the undercard of the mega fight between Klitschko vs. Joshua at Wembley Stadium in London on 29 April 2017. Simion was known to the British public for his losing effort to Lee Selby in 2013. A week before the fight, IBF revealed the fight would be a final eliminator for their world title. At the time of the fight, Quigg was ranked number 6 by the IBF. Roach claimed that Quigg 'works harder than Pacquiao', stating, "His work ethic is great and we've seen a lot of really good changes already in the gym." Quigg also said that he felt like a "a different fighter". Quigg became a step closer to fighting for the IBF featherweight title when he was taken the distance but won by comfortable margins. Two judges scored the fight 117–111 and 117–111 whilst the third judge scored it closer 115–113 all in favour of Quigg. Simion started off well winning the first couple of rounds. Over the next 8 rounds, Quigg took over landing the better shots. Simion landed clean shots, non-of which did any damage to Quigg. His best moment came in round 7,. when he landed a right hand to Simion's head, which backed him up. Quigg admitted the fight was tough. "It was hard work, but I was in control at all the times. First fight with Freddie, and I'm very happy."

Sky Sports revealed on 25 September 2017, Matchroom Sport would be holding a card at the Casino e Monte Carlo Salle Medecin in Monte Carlo, Monaco on 4 November. Eddie Hearn confirmed Quigg would fight on the under-card in a WBA world title eliminator against 36-year-old Ukrainian contender Oleg Yefimovych (29–2–1, 16 KOs). Yefimovych was coming into this fight on a 12-fight win streak, stretching back to 2011. Freddie Roach did not work in Quigg's corner for the fight. Roach made a commitment to work in the corner of UFC star Georges St-Pierre, who fought and defeated Michael Bisping on UFC 217, which took place in New York. Quigg won the fight via stoppage in round 6, in what was a one-sided beatdown. Quigg proved to be too much for Yefimovych and landed power shots to the head. During some exchanges, Yefimovych did well to counter some shots, however Quigg remained in control. In round 6, Yefimovych was taking too much punishment, appearing hurt, referee Luis Pabon called the fight off. The official time off stoppage was 50 seconds into the round. Quigg admitted he was a bit reckless in the opening round and said, "You cannot do that at a higher level. When I started relaxing, I felt miles better ... round four onwards, I don't think he wanted to know." After the fight WBA announced Quigg as their obligatory challenger.

==== Quigg vs. Valdez ====
On 3 January 2018, ESPN first reported that a deal was close to being reached for Óscar Valdez (23–0, 19 KOs) to defend his WBO featherweight title against Quigg. The fight would take place on 10 March, with the venue likely to be the StubHub Center in Carson, California. On 13 January, the fight was finalised. Promoter Hearn also tweeted the confirmation. Valdez came in at 125.8 pounds at the weigh in for his fourth defence. Quigg however came in 3 pounds over at 128.8 pounds. He was not allowed to re-weigh. According to the California State Athletic Commission, if a fighter is 2 pounds or more over the contractual limit, he would not be allowed to lost the extra weight as he would have been 'dried out', any more weight loss could potentially be dangerous to his health. The CSAC fined Quigg 20% of his official purse of $100,000, with Valdez receiving half of the money from the fine. Quigg's purse was believed to be far more at around $500,000 plus British TV rights. Valdez was due his highest purse at $420,000, not including the additional $10,000 from Quigg's purse.

After a hard-fought 12 round battle with saw Valdez break Quigg's nose and in return Valdez have his own front teeth damaged, the final scorecards read 117–111, 117–111 and 118–110 in favour of the Valdez, thus retaining his WBO title. Quigg suffered a cut over his left eye in round 5 which caused him issues later in the fight whereas Valdez after having his mouth busted, was seen with blood pouring out in the second half of the fight. The difference in the fight was that Valdez had too much hand and foot speed for Quigg and was able unload on multiple punches on Quigg. Valdez's style of a higher punch output also caused him to take a lot of punishment throughout the fight. Valdez was hurt in round 5 from a big left hook from Quigg. In round 11, Valdez hurt Quigg with a hard head shot in the final 20 seconds. It was in round 11 that Quigg began to use his jab more to his own advantage. Valdez was then hurt by a low blow in that round. In round 12, Valdez tied Quigg up frequently and used movement to stay out of trouble. Quigg was humble in defeat stating the better man won, but felt it was closer. ESPN scored the fight for Valdez 115–113. They also reported that Quigg weighed 142.2 pounds compared to Valdez who was 135.6 pounds on fight night. CompuBox numbers showed that Valdez landed 238 of 914 punches thrown (26%), and Quigg landed 143 of his 595 thrown (24%). After the fight Quigg explained the reason he missed weight was because he had fractured his foot four weeks before the fight and unable to run to lose the extra pounds. The card was watched by an average 1.1 million viewers on ESPN.

==== Quigg vs. Briones ====
On 20 August, Matchroom announced that Quigg would once again fight in the United States, this time at the TD Garden in Boston, Massachusetts, on 20 October 2018 on the Billy Joe Saunders vs. Demetrius Andrade card. On 1 October, Quigg's opponent was announced to be 32-year-old Mexican journeyman Mario Briones (29–7–2, 21 KOs) in a scheduled 8-round bout. Quigg defeated Briones by a 2nd-round knockout. He hurt Briones with two hard right hands at the start of round 2. Quigg then landed flurries on Briones, whilst against the ropes, until referee Gene Del Bianco stepped in and stopped the contest. Briones was not happy about the fight being halted, as he was still on his feet, however gave the referee little choice for not engaging back. Quigg was hit with shots in both rounds as the fight proved to be competitive for how long it lasted.

On 26 February 2019, Matchroom Boxing announced the rematch between Srisaket Sor Rungvisai vs. Juan Francisco Estrada to take place at The Forum in Los Angeles on 26 April, to be broadcast live on Sky Sports in the UK and DAZN in the USA. The undercard was not finalized, but was revealed that Quigg would return on the card. His opponent was later revealed to be Puerto Rican boxer Jayson Vélez (28-5-1 20 KOs). Vélez was coming off back-to-back stoppage wins over Orlando Cruz and Victor Terrazas, after losing to Ryan Garcia in May 2018. Quigg was looking to impress in this fight as he wanted to challenge IBF super-featherweight champion Tevin Farmer in the near future. The fight would be easy to make, as both Quigg and Farmer were with the same promotional company. On 19 April, a week before the fight, Quigg pulled out due to suffering a tendon injury. The injury came during sparring and Quigg was told he would need to undergo surgery. Quigg explained the injury, "Training had been going fantastic and everything was well on schedule but in my final week of heavy preparation before tapering down I suffered an injury during sparring. A total freak accident where I hit my sparring partner with a left hook, my elbow jarred and the tendon ripped clean off my bicep and elbow." There was no word when Quigg could return or whether he would fight Vélez in the future.

==== Quigg vs. Carroll ====
On 26 September 2019, Eddie Hearn revealed a possible line-up for the undercard of Andy Ruiz Jr vs. Anthony Joshua rematch, which was scheduled to take place at Diriyah in Saudi Arabia on 7 December. Amongst the line-up was Quigg. Despite some tensions in the Middle East, Hearn said the event would still go ahead. According to Hearn, Irish boxer Jono Carroll (17–1–1, 3 KOs) was being locked in to fight Quigg. On 23 October, Hearn confirmed the fight was added to the card. Carroll said the fight was a big opportunity for him. On 9 November, Quigg was once again forced pull out of a fight. This was due to a recurring elbow injury. Quigg said he felt a tear whilst he was sparring in training. Quigg wanted the fight rescheduled in the new year. Speaking on the injury, he said, "I am extremely disappointed to announce I will not be fighting on December 7 in Saudi Arabia. My arm needs further time to rehabilitate. I've followed the rehabilitation programme and everything was looking great. I went to the specialist at the start of camp and again four weeks later, everything was looking and feeling good. I have a recurring injury to my left distal tendon, which is going to need four to six weeks of rest."

On 17 January 2020, the fight was rescheduled to headline its own card at the Manchester Arena on 7 March. The fight was being billed "England vs. Ireland". It would mark Quigg's first fight in 17 months. A week after the fight was announced, it was revealed that Joe Gallagher would be back in Quigg's corner. The pair had split 3 years ago when Quigg decided to train at the Wild Card Gym with Freddie Roach. The fight was also Quigg's first fight in England since 29 April 2017, just after he split with Gallagher. Carroll said the change of trainers ahead of the fight showed signs of weakness, which in effect boosted Carroll's confidence. Quigg, although not looking ahead, wanted to use this fight to entice rematches in the future with Frampton and Valdez, the only two losses on his professional record. Speaking to reporters after the weigh in, Carroll predicted he would stop Quigg in 8 rounds. he felt this fight was his 'pass the torch' moment. The weigh in wasn't without any entertainment. Quigg shoved Carroll when they came face-to-face. Quigg weighed 129.5 pounds and Carroll scaled on the limit at 130 pounds.

In a surprise upset, Carroll outboxed, outlanded and dominated Quigg en route to an 11th-round TKO victory. Apart from a few good moments in the second round, Quigg was outclassed by Carroll throughout the whole fight, which prompted Quigg's corner to throw in the towel in round 11. Quigg was beaten to the punch throughout the fight by Carroll, who used his hand and foot speed, which made all the difference in the fight. Gallagher told Quigg at the end of round 9 that he would stop the fight if Quigg didn't show him anything, to which Quigg responded that he wasn't being beaten up. Quigg felt he would have beaten Carroll, had he been at his best, but admitted the better man won. Quigg stated it was a must-win fight and would explore his options.

=== Retirement ===
Quigg announced his retirement a day after the loss on 8 March 2020 via his Instagram account. He posted the following:

"Unfortunately last night [Saturday] wasn't my night and it showed me it was time to call it a day! Thank you to everyone for the tremendous support over the years. It's been a great journey and I couldn't have given the sport any more. I've achieved everything my desire, dedication and ability would take me to and I can walk away with my head held high!"

Quigg was aiming to become a two-weight world champion, however the loss to Carroll and after reflecting on his performance, felt it was time to walk away. He closed out his career with 40 professional fights, with only 3 defeats. A few months later, Quigg expanded on his career and retirement. He discussed the benefits of learning under the likes of Brian Hughes, Ricky Hatton, Joe Gallagher and Freddie Roach. Quigg stated once the pandemic had passed , he would travel to the United States and work closely with Roach.

== Professional boxing record ==
40 fights	35 wins	3 losses
By knockout	26	1
By decision	9	2
Draws	2	

No.	Result	Record	Opponent	Type	Round, time	Date	Location	Notes
40	Loss	35–3–2	Jono Carroll	TKO	11 (12), 2:14	7 Mar 2020	Manchester Arena, Manchester, England	
39	Win	35–2–2	Mario Briones	TKO	2 (8), 1:12	20 Oct 2018	TD Garden, Boston, Massachusetts, US	
38	Loss	34–2–2	Óscar Valdez	UD	12	10 Mar 2018	StubHub Center, Carson, California, US	WBO featherweight title at stake for Valdez only (Quigg overweight)
37	Win	34–1–2	Oleg Yefimovych	TKO	6 (12), 0:50	4 Nov 2017	Casino de Salle Medecin, Monte Carlo, Monaco	
36	Win	33–1–2	Viorel Simion	UD	12	29 Apr 2017	Wembley Stadium, London, England	
35	Win	32–1–2	Jose Cayetano	KO	9 (12), 1:23	10 Dec 2016	Manchester Arena, Manchester, England	Won vacant WBA International featherweight title
34	Loss	31–1–2	Carl Frampton	SD	12	27 Feb 2016	Manchester Arena, Manchester, England	Lost WBA super-bantamweight title; For IBF super-bantamweight title
33	Win	31–0–2	Kiko Martínez	TKO	2 (12), 1:04	18 Jul 2015	Manchester Arena, Manchester, England	Retained WBA (Regular) super-bantamweight title
32	Win	30–0–2	Hidenori Otake	UD	12	22 Nov 2014	Echo Arena, Liverpool, England	Retained WBA (Regular) super-bantamweight title
31	Win	29–0–2	Stephane Jamoye	TKO	3 (12), 1:13	13 Sep 2014	Phones 4u Arena, Manchester, England	Retained WBA (Regular) super-bantamweight title
30	Win	28–0–2	Tshifhiwa Munyai	KO	2 (12), 1:56	19 Apr 2014	Phones 4u Arena, Manchester, England	Retained WBA (Regular) super-bantamweight title
29	Win	27–0–2	Diego Oscar Silva	KO	2 (12), 1:41	23 Nov 2013	Phones 4u Arena, Manchester, England	Retained WBA (Regular) super-bantamweight title
28	Draw	26–0–2	Yoandris Salinas	MD	12	5 Oct 2013	The O2 Arena, London, England	Retained WBA (Regular) super-bantamweight title
27	Win	26–0–1	William Prado	TKO	3 (10), 2:31	29 Jun 2013	Bolton Arena, Bolton, England	
26	Win	25–0–1	Rendall Munroe	TKO	6 (12), 2:37	24 Nov 2012	Manchester Arena, Manchester, England	Won WBA interim super-bantamweight title
25	Draw	24–0–1	Rendall Munroe	TD	3 (12), 0:43	16 Jun 2012	Manchester Velodrome, Manchester, England	For WBA interim super-bantamweight title; Munroe cut from accidental head clash
24	Win	24–0	Jamie Arthur	TKO	8 (12), 0:35	4 Feb 2012	Reebok Stadium, Bolton, England	Retained British super-bantamweight title
23	Win	23–0	Jason Booth	RTD	7 (12), 3:00	22 Oct 2011	Castle Leisure Centre, Bury, England	Won British super-bantamweight title
22	Win	22–0	Franklin Varela	TKO	7 (12), 2:21	23 Jul 2011	Castle Leisure Centre, Bury, England	Retained WBA Inter-Continental super-bantamweight title
21	Win	21–0	Daniel Kodjo Sassou	UD	12	26 Nov 2010	Reebok Stadium, Bolton, England	Retained WBA Inter-Continental super-bantamweight title
20	Win	20–0	Santiago Allione	KO	3 (12), 2:03	25 Sep 2010	Castle Leisure Centre, Bury, England	Won vacant WBA Inter-Continental super-bantamweight title
19	Win	19–0	Gavin Reid	TKO	9 (10), 1:20	16 Jul 2010	Bolton Arena, Bolton, England	
18	Win	18–0	Andrey Kostin	TKO	1 (8), 2:00	29 May 2010	Castle Leisure Centre, Bury, England	
17	Win	17–0	Nikita Lukin	KO	1 (8), 1:57	19 Feb 2010	Fenton Manor Sports Complex, Stoke-on-Trent, England	
16	Win	16–0	Yuriy Voronin	TKO	6 (8), 1:54	27 Nov 2009	Robin Park Arena, Wigan, England, England	
15	Win	15–0	Nico Schröder	TKO	2 (4), 1:45	25 Sep 2009	Manchester Velodrome, Manchester, England	
14	Win	14–0	Ricardo Tanase	KO	1 (6), 2:45	11 Jul 2009	Leisure Centre, Altrincham, England	
13	Win	13–0	Faycal Messaoudene	TKO	5 (6), 2:47	28 Mar 2009	Leisure Centre, Altrincham, England	
12	Win	12–0	Carl Allen	PTS	4	24 Jan 2009	Tower Circus, Blackpool, England	
11	Win	11–0	Gheorghe Ghiompirica	PTS	4	6 Dec 2008	Robin Park Arena, Wigan, England	
10	Win	10–0	Sumaila Badu	TKO	1 (4), 2:32	7 Nov 2008	Robin Park Arena, Wigan, England	
9	Win	9–0	Peter Allen	TKO	1 (4), 2:37	19 Jul 2008	Liverpool Olympia, Liverpool, England	
8	Win	8–0	Angelo Villani	TKO	2 (6), 2:37	4 Jul 2008	Everton Park Sports Centre, Liverpool, England	
7	Win	7–0	Sid Razak	RTD	2 (4), 3:00	7 Jun 2008	Robin Park Arena, Wigan, England	
6	Win	6–0	Gheorghe Ghiompirica	PTS	4	14 Mar 2008	George H Carnall Leisure Centre, Manchester, England	
5	Win	5–0	Delroy Spencer	PTS	6	3 Dec 2007	Piccadilly Hotel, Manchester, England	
4	Win	4–0	Sandy Bartlett	TKO	3 (6), 1:22	28 Sep 2007	Guild Hall, Preston, England	
3	Win	3–0	Shaun Walton	PTS	6	11 Aug 2007	Liverpool Olympia, Liverpool, England	
2	Win	2–0	Shaun Walton	TKO	1 (6), 1:40	30 Jun 2007	George H Carnall Leisure Centre, Manchester, England	
1	Win	1–0	Gary Sheil	PTS	6	21 Apr 2007	Jarvis Hotel, Manchester, England	

Sporting positions
Regional boxing titles
Vacant Title last held by Arsen Martirosyan	WBA Inter-Continental super-bantamweight champion 25 September 2010 – June 2012; Vacated	Vacant Title next held by Lewis Pettitt
Preceded by Jason Booth	British super-bantamweight champion 22 October 2011 – June 2012; Vacated	Vacant Title next held by Kid Galahad
Vacant Title last held by Simpiwe Vetyeka	WBA International featherweight champion 10 December 2016 – April 2017; Vacated	Vacant Title next held by Xu Can
World boxing titles
Vacant Title last held by Guillermo Rigondeaux	WBA super-bantamweight champion Interim title 24 November 2012 – 5 September 2013; Promoted	Succeeded by Nehomar Cermeño
Vacant Title last held by Lee Ryol-li	WBA super-bantamweight champion Regular title 5 September 2013 – 30 October 2015; Promoted	Vacant Title next held by Nehomar Cermeño
Preceded by Guillermo Rigondeaux as Super champion declared champion in recess	WBA super-bantamweight champion 30 October 2015 – 27 February 2016; Failed to win Unified title	Succeeded by Carl Frampton as Unified champion
