= Carl Frampton =

Irish boxer (born 1987)

Carl Frampton MBE
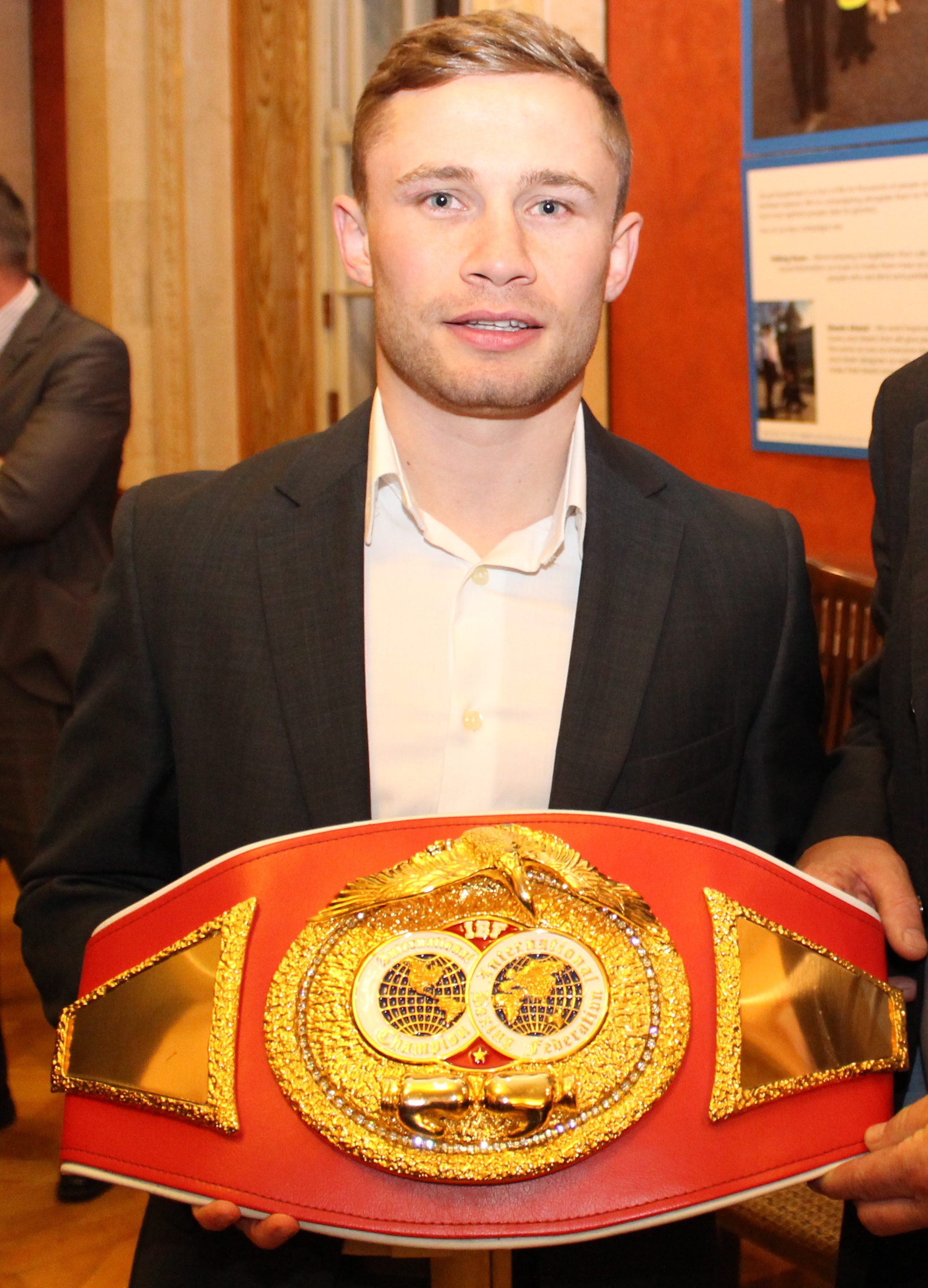
- Frampton at Stormont, 2013

Personal information
- Nicknames: The Jackal; Brick Fists
- Nationality: Irish
- Born: 21 February 1987 (age 39) Tigers Bay, Belfast, Northern Ireland
- Height: 5 ft 5 in (165 cm)
- Weight: Super-bantamweight; Featherweight; Super-featherweight; Lightweight

Boxing career
- Reach: 62 in (157 cm)
- Stance: Orthodox

Boxing record
- Total fights: 31
- Wins: 28
- Win by KO: 16
- Losses: 3
Medal record
Men's amateur boxing
Representing Ireland
EU Championships
Silver medal – second place	Dublin 2007	Featherweight

Carl Frampton MBE (born 21 February 1987) is a Northern Irish former professional boxer who competed from 2009 to 2021. He held world championships in two weight classes, including the IBF super bantamweight title from 2014 to 2016, the Super version of the WBA super bantamweight title in 2016, and the Super version of the WBA (Super) featherweight title from 2016 to 2017.

By winning the featherweight world title in 2016, Frampton became the first boxer from Northern Ireland to have held world titles in two weight classes. This earned him Fighter of the Year awards from The Ring magazine, the Boxing Writers Association of America, and ESPN. He was also ranked no. 10 in The Ring's pound for pound list.

Frampton retired from boxing after losing against Jamel Herring for the WBO junior-lightweight title.

== Early life ==
Frampton was the middle child among three siblings. He grew up in Tiger's Bay, an inner-city area marked by a history of conflict between Catholics and Protestants. His family belonged to the working class; his mother worked in shopping centers while his father served as a leisure centre attendant. Despite their financial constraints, Frampton's parents ensured that he and his siblings had enough food and kept up with the latest trends. From a young age, Frampton developed a keen interest in boxing and frequently visited the Midland Boxing Club located near his home. At first, his small stature prevented him from training at the club, but his determination led him to return the very next day, where he soon discovered a deep passion for the sport.

== Amateur career ==
Amateur boxing in both the Republic of Ireland and Northern Ireland is governed by the Irish Amateur Boxing Association. As an amateur, Frampton fought out of the Midland Boxing Club in Tiger's Bay and won the Irish senior flyweight title in 2005 and added the Irish featherweight title in 2009, beating David Oliver Joyce in the final.

He also claimed a silver medal at the 2007 European Union Amateur Boxing Championships in Dublin, losing to France's Khedafi Djelkhir in the final. Frampton is one of Ireland's most successful amateur boxers of recent years. He had an approximate record of 130 wins and 50 losses.

Later commenting on his decision to box for the Irish team, Frampton, who grew up in a Unionist area of Belfast, said "I get asked all the time, 'would you have liked to have boxed for Great Britain?' And the answer is 'no'. I was looked after by Irish boxing from pretty much 11 years old and was very proud to box for Ireland." He added, "it's very humbling to know that so many people are supporting me from all over Ireland and mainland UK."

== Professional career ==
=== Super-bantamweight ===
==== Early career ====
Frampton turned professional after his victory in the 2009 Irish featherweight finals. In June 2009, fought his first professional fight under Matchroom Boxing, at the Olympia in Liverpool, England and beat Sandor Szinavel with a second-round knock-out on a card that included Grzegorz Proksa and Ajose Olusegan. He earned £4,000 for his debut. In January 2010, he was named Ireland's Prospect of the Year at the Irish National Boxing Awards. In September 2010 he recorded an "electrifying" win over the Ukrainian Yuri Voronin in front of an Ulster Hall crowd which included Daniel Day-Lewis. The win led the Belfast Telegraph to liken him to a "reincarnation" of Barry McGuigan.

In December 2010, Frampton won his first professional title, the BBBofC Celtic super-bantamweight title, with a second-round TKO win over Scottish boxer Gavin Reid in the Ulster Hall. Following his victory, Frampton described the super-bantamweight division as being "super-hot" and named Scott Quigg and Rendall Munroe as potential opponents. He then went on to get a fourth-round TKO win over Venezuelan Oscar Chacin, and later fought his first defence of his BBBofC Celtic title against Welshman Robbie Turley in June 2011, winning by a unanimous decision after ten rounds.

==== Domestic and regional success ====
Frampton fought Australian Mark Quon as a replacement for Kiko Martinez on 10 September for the Commonwealth super-bantamweight title at the Odyssey Arena in Belfast winning by a fourth-round TKO stoppage. On 28 January 2012, he successfully defended his Commonwealth title against Kris Hughes in the York Hall, with the fight having to be stopped in the seventh round. According to the BBC, Frampton controlled the contest from the start and was never threatened by his opponent. On 17 March 2012, Frampton once again defended his title against Ghana's Prosper Ankrah and won by a second-round TKO stoppage. After his victory Frampton challenged the British champion Scott Quigg saying that "I don't know if he wants it but, if he does, he should tell his promoter".

Frampton then beat fellow unbeaten contender Raúl Hirales, Jr. (previously 16–0, 8 KO's) of Mexico by a unanimous decision and won the vacant IBF Inter-continental super-bantamweight title on the undercard of Carl Froch vs. Lucian Bute in Nottingham, UK. The fight took place on 26 May 2012. On 22 September 2012, Frampton took on former two-time world champion Steve Molitor. The fight took place in the Odyssey Arena in Belfast on a card that included Martin Lindsay and Paul McCloskey. Frampton scored an impressive sixth-round TKO and had the former champion on the canvas three times during the bout. After the fight, Frampton announced that he was willing to "fight anyone" and that he was "ready for a world title fight".

On 9 February 2013, Frampton faced hard-punching Spaniard Kiko Martinez in front of 8,000 of his home fans in the Odyssey Arena in Belfast. Martínez, the European champion, had previously knocked out Bernard Dunne in 86 seconds to win the title and had never been knocked down. Frampton won by TKO in Round 9, winning the European super-bantamweight title and retaining the IBF Inter-Continental super-bantamweight title. After the fight Frampton said "I just want the people of Belfast to be proud of me", and described his beaten opponent as "hard as nails". In August 2014, Martinez won the IBF title with a sixth-round stoppage of the previously unbeaten Colombian Jonatan Romero.

On 19 October 2013, Frampton defended his EBU and IBF Inter-Continental titles in an IBF title eliminator against IBF fourth-ranked Jeremy Parodi. The fight took place in front of a maximum capacity 9,000 fans at the Odyssey Arena, Belfast. Frampton knocked Parodi out with a body shot at the end of the sixth round. On 4 April 2014 Frampton faced the Mexican Hugo Cazares at the Odyssey Arena in a final eliminator for Leo Santa Cruz's WBC super-bantamweight title. In front of a sold-out crowd of 9,000 Frampton knocked out Cazares in the second round, with a left hook to the head.

==== Frampton vs. Martínez II ====
Frampton challenged for his first world title on 6 September 2014 in a rematch against Kiko Martinez (31–4, 23 KOs). Martinez's IBF super-bantamweight title was at stake and the bout took place in an outdoor arena at the Titanic Quarter in Belfast. In the build-up to the fight, Frampton said of Martinez: "He's very emotional and that's what makes him dangerous... he's a hot-head, he can be very easily agitated but he's coming to win". Fighting in front of a crowd of 16,000 Frampton knocked Martinez down in the fifth round and won by unanimous decision, with two scores of 119-108 and one score of 118–111, winning his first world title. Interviewed after the fight Frampton said "I've got the world title. I feel a bit emotional – it has been a long time coming, it has been a hard road. I intend to hang on to it for a very long time." He went on to call for a unification fight with WBA (Regular) champion Scott Quigg, saying "I'll fight him in Manchester, I'll fight him anywhere". After the fight, Barry McGuigan said of his protégé "This kid could end up as the best Irish fighter there has ever been."

As result of his performances Frampton was nominated for the 2014 RTE Sports Person of the Year. In 2015, he was named Britain's Coolest Man by ZOO Magazine. Frampton said after receiving the award, "I couldn't believe it when they told me, I thought it was a wind-up! But it's great, especially as it's ZOO readers and the people of Britain who have voted for me. It's also great for the sport of boxing."

Frampton was appointed Member of the Order of the British Empire (MBE) in the 2016 New Year Honours for services to boxing.

==== Frampton vs. Avalos ====
In December 2014, it was announced that Frampton would make his first defence of his title on 28 February 2015 against American Chris Avalos (25–2, 19 KOs) at the Odyssey Arena in Belfast, Northern Ireland. ITV decided to pick up the bout in the UK. For the fight, Frampton sparred with then-unbeaten Horacio "Violent" García, who later fought each other in 2017. A sell-out crowd of 11,000 filled the arena. Frampton defended his world title against Avalos in a one-sided, fifth-round knockout, where referee Foster waved off the contest at 1 minute, 33 seconds. The fight averaged 1.1 million viewers and peaked at 1.9 million viewers on ITV.

==== Frampton vs. González Jr. ====
It was announced that Frampton would make a second defence of his IBF World title on 18 July at the Don Haskins Convention Center, El Paso, Texas, against 22-year-old Alejandro González Jr. live on ITV. Gonzalez, who was a massive underdog, scored two knockdowns in the first round and appeared to ruin Frampton's plans. Frampton shook off the knockdowns, came back strong and rolled to a decisive unanimous decision in a highly entertaining fight that headlined the Premier Boxing Champions card on CBS. Despite the anxious early moments, Frampton won 116–108, 116-108 and 115–109 on the scorecards. Referee Mark Calo-Oy warned González for hitting Frampton with a low blow in the second round and then took away a point when he did it again in the third round. Frampton controlled the fight from there on. According to CompuBox punch statistics, Frampton connected on 246 of 692 blows (36 percent), whilst Gonzalez landed 145 of 593 (24 percent). The fight averaged 1.7 million viewers and peaked at 2.4 million at 10:55 pm on ITV.

==== Frampton vs. Quigg ====
On 27 October 2015, the long-awaited fight between Frampton and undefeated WBA (Regular) super-bantamweight champion Scott Quigg (31–0–2, 23 KOs) was being discussed according to both sides. The bout would be the biggest British fight since Froch vs. Groves in 2014. According to multiple sources a few days later, a deal was finalised and a date in early 2016 was talked about. Although the promoters said the fight was a super-bantamweight unification, it was not officially sanctioned as one. This was due to Quigg holding the WBA (regular) title. Cuban boxer Guillermo Rigondeaux (16–0, 10 KOs) was officially recognised as the (super) champion by the WBA. It was believed that Frampton aligning with boxing manager and advisor Al Haymon may have helped get the deal across the line, due to the close relationship between him and Quigg's promoter Eddie Hearn. The fight was discussed at the start on 2015. Quigg not accepting 60–40 in Frampton's favour was one of the reasons it did not happen. Hearn's response to this was the winner would take 60%. Barry McGuigan felt this was unfair to the fighters. He also claimed Quigg had never headlined a fight, whereas Frampton had sold out 16,000 arena shows in Belfast. Frampton was offered a £1.5 million take it or leave it.

On 2 November, the fight was officially announced to take place at the Phones4U Arena in Manchester on 27 February 2016, billed for the IBF and WBA super-bantamweight titles, on Sky Sports Box-Office. Both boxers spoke excitedly about the fight. Frampton discredited Quigg's title, saying only his IBF belt was at stake. Frampton said, "I'm delighted that we have finally got this fight signed. I'm the legitimate champion and I'm going to his backyard to defend my title because that's what champions do. Fans will find out who the real champion is, I'm going to win this fight in style." On 26 January, Showtime Sports picked up the TV rights to broadcast the fight in the USA. The fight would be broadcast live, ahead of the Showtime Championship Boxing telecast of Léo Santa Cruz vs. Kiko Martinez.

Frampton believed Quigg finally took the fight on the back of his own fight, where he was dropped in round one against Alejandro Gonzalez Jr. but won the fight via decision. Frampton called it a blessing in disguise. Frampton said he had been calling for a fight against Quigg since he was British champion four years ago. The IBF formally sanctioned the bout as a unification only on the condition that the winner of the bout would have 90 days to agree a deal with mandatory challenger, Japanese boxer Shingo Wake. On the other hand, the WBA Championships Committee announced Rigondeaux as 'champion in recess', due to his managerial and promotional issues and not having a fight scheduled. The WBA made it clear that they wanted the winner of Frampton vs. Quigg to fight Rigondeaux before 27 July 2016. In the case of a draw, it would be Quigg vs. Rigondeaux. Frampton and Quigg both appeared in media conferences and said they were both open to fighting Rigondeaux, also acknowledging IBF's request to fight Wake. Ahead of his UK debut, Rigondeaux said he was open to returning to the UK to fight the winner. The fight was also going to be closely watched by featherweight champion, Santa Cruz. He was aware the bout would likely be both boxers last at super-bantamweight and said he was looking forward to them stepping up weight to challenge him.

Frampton and Quigg both weighed in at the arena in front of 3,000 fans on the Friday. Frampton had support from the traveling Irish fans, who made their presence known. Quigg weighed 121.6 pounds and Frampton weighed 121.7 pounds. There was a tense stare down during the face-off with neither fighter breaking eye-contact which last around the minute mark. It was eventually by Frampton who blew Quigg a kiss, then turned to face the crowd. Joe Gallagher and Shane McGuigan, the trainers of Quigg and Frampton, respectively, also had a stare down and small tussle at the weigh in. Later that day, it came to light that Frampton made a request for the Sky Sports broadcast team to not include an individual. No names were mentioned, however Frampton made it known in the past, person in question had been critical of them. The bookmakers had Frampton as a slight favourite going into the fight. There was still tension heading into fight night due to both boxers wanting the bigger dressing room. Quigg believed he should have the bigger room due to being the home fighter and Frampton fought his case due to being the bigger draw in the fight. There was reports to suggest Frampton could pull out of the fight. Quigg said it wasn't an issue for him and that he'd get dressed at his house in Bury if it meant the fight would still take place. Eddie Hearn also said that they had to agree to multiple demands from team Frampton in order to get the fight over the line from having Frampton's name on the left side of the poster, to having American judges and entering the ring second.

In a close fight, in front of a 20,000 sell-out crowd, Frampton won by split decision with the judges scoring the fight 113–115, 116–112, 116–112. Frampton was in full control of the first half of the fight, during which Quigg simply could not find his range, however Quigg finally came alive down the stretch as the contest turned into a desperate tussle, but Frampton gave as good as he got. Hearn said Frampton was the deserved winner. The fight was criticised for the lack of action. The CompuBox also supported this, showing that Frampton landed 83 of his 592 punches thrown (14%) and Quigg landed 85 of his 322 thrown (26.4%). It showed that no power punches were landed by either in the opening 3 rounds. According to Hearn, the PPV did 220,000 buys at box office.

In the post-fight, Frampton said, “I couldn’t believe what was going on when I heard the split decision – I felt I was a comfortable winner – but it’s onwards and upwards for me now. I knew it was going to be a tactical fight all along and a bit timid. I’m not going to rush into silly punches. You have to be smart. I was and I got the win. He’s a solid puncher […] I think both of us are and that is why it was so cautious early on. But he never really rocked me.” Quigg broke his jaw during the fight, which was caused by an uppercut. He underwent surgery the following day and said he would like a rematch. Frampton entered Quigg's dressing room after the fight, showing respect between the teams.

In March 2016, several press releases announced that Frampton did not intend to face WBA (Super) super bantamweight champion Guilerrmo Rigondeaux in title consolidation bout. So Frampton was stripped of his WBA (Regular) title.

=== Featherweight ===
==== Frampton vs. Santa Cruz ====
Frampton moved up a weight class to fight undefeated Mexican Léo Santa Cruz (32–0–1, 22 KO's) for the WBA (Super) featherweight title at the Barclays Centre in New York City on 30 July 2016. In a potential fight of the year candidate, Frampton became the first two-division world champion in the history of Northern Ireland as he dethroned Santa Cruz via a 12-round majority decision win before a crowd of 9,062. One judge scored it a 114–114 draw but the others made Frampton the winner, 116-112 and 117–111. Frampton had a higher accuracy rate, despite both fighters landing equal numbers of punches. According to CompuBox stats, Frampton landed 242 of 668 punches (36 percent), whilst Santa Cruz connected on 255 of 1,002 blows (25 percent). In the post fight, Frampton said he wanted to defend the title in his home city and did not want to rule out a rematch. In the post-fight, Frampton said, "It's a dream come true. I had the dream of winning a world title, but I never thought I'd win in two divisions. It was a tough fight. I wanted a fight the people could remember. I respect Santa Cruz a lot. He was a true warrior." Frampton vowed to break records and become the first Irishman to win world titles at three different weights. The fight averaged 480,000 and peaked at 549,000 viewers.

==== Frampton vs. Santa Cruz II ====
As discussed immediately following the first bout, a rematch between Frampton and Santa Cruz was finalised in October. There was talks the fight would take place in Frampton's home town of Belfast; however, the venue was confirmed to be at the MGM Grand in Las Vegas, the first time Frampton would fight there since becoming a professional. The date was set for 28 January 2017. 10,085 were in attendance as Frampton lost his title by majority decision. Santa Cruz and Frampton immediately discussed interest in a third fight, possibly in Belfast. Frampton earned a purse of $1 million compared to $900,000 that Santa Cruz received. Frampton only landed 133 of his 592 punches thrown (22%) whereas Santa Cruz landed 230 of his 884 thrown (26%). Nielsen Media Research reported the fight averaged 587,000 and peaked at 643,000 viewers.

==== Change of promoters ====
On 14 May 2017, Frampton was ranked number two by the WBA at super featherweight, which indicated to many that he might be moving up to become a three-weight world champion. By the end of May, talks had begun for a fight against IBF champion Lee Selby. Frampton's promoter Barry McGuigan said the fight would happen, but not immediately due to Selby having a mandatory fight next. On 15 June, Frampton labelled Selby a 'time-waster' and announced that he would be returning to the ring in Belfast on 29 July against an unnamed opponent. Cyclone Promotions confirmed that Frampton would fight 23-year-old Mexican boxer Andrés Gutiérrez (35–1–1, 25 KOs) at the SSE Arena in Belfast in a WBC eliminator. A day before the fight, Frampton weighed 1 lb. over the 126-pound limit. Therefore, the fight was to go ahead without being an eliminator. Frampton apologised to his fans for the turn of events

"After a long training camp of intense preparation and trying to make weight, I was disappointed that I came in 1lb over the featherweight limit today. I tried everything I could to cut down, but unfortunately, my body just wouldn't allow it in the end. I'd like to apologise to the fans that have got involved and shown incredible support throughout this frantic fight week, and to those that will be cheering me onto victory on Saturday night. Furthermore, I would like to apologise to my opponent Andres Gutierrez - who will still have the opportunity to win the WBC eliminator on Saturday."

Later that day, Gutiérrez slipped in his hotel shower and suffered a gash to his chin. It was also reported that he had knocked out some teeth in the process and bruised his head. The fight was, therefore, cancelled. McGuigan was said to be disappointed, but told ticket holders to retain their tickets as the card could be rescheduled. Cyclone Promotions, together with the SSE Arena and the Gutiérrez camp, said they would work quickly to reschedule the fight.

On 17 August 2017, the fight was called off completely. The news came after reports circulated that Frampton would be parting ways with long-time promoter Cyclone Promotions. A date in November was considered but was unsuitable for both boxers. Frampton officially announced the split with Cyclone Promotions on 22 August 2017. The tweet made no mention of whether he would still be trained by Shane McGuigan.

In early September, rumours circulated that Frampton would hire former boxer Jamie Moore as his trainer. On 6 September, Frampton confirmed Moore as his new trainer. On 19 September, Frampton announced he had signed a deal with MTK Global, who would work on his behalf as advisors. On 23 September it was rumoured that Frampton would sign with British promoter Frank Warren. After splitting with Cyclone, Frampton made it known that he would only sign with a promoter who could guarantee him a stadium fight in Ireland. A day later, Frampton revealed he had joined Warren: "I had interest from America and the UK but it really came down to two very similar offers from Eddie Hearn and Frank Warren. I'm desperate to kick on and have a fight before Christmas and I can confirm I will be fighting in Belfast." He wanted to secure a world title in the first half of 2018.

==== Frampton vs. García ====
At the official press conference of the promotional announcement, it was announced that Frampton would fight an unnamed opponent on 18 November 2017 in Belfast at the SSE Arena. According to Warren, this would pave the way for a world title fight at Windsor Park in May/June 2018. On 4 October, it was confirmed that Frampton would fight Mexican boxer Horacio García (33–3–1, 24 KOs) in a ten-round bout. Speaking about the fight, Frampton said, “I asked for a ten-round fight. I would have been happy to be doing twelve rounds but speaking to my team after the bad year I’ve had and the long layoff they thought it was only fair to come back with a ten rounder before we target the big names.” This would mark Frampton's first fight in Belfast since February 2015, when he made his first defence of the IBF super-bantamweight title.

The fight was fought at 127 pounds. García's stablemate Canelo Álvarez was introduced to the crowd of 10,000 pro-Frampton fans. Frampton, in what was not his best performance in a long time, decisioned a brave and tough opponent in García after ten rounds. The three judges' scored the fight 98–93, 97–93 and 98–93. Some at ringside had the fight closer, but had Frampton winning nonetheless. Frampton started off strong, however ring-rust became an issue. From the fourth round, García repeatedly trapped Frampton against the ropes and worked him over with body shots. In round 7, Frampton was dropped after García landed a left hook. Referee Victor Loughlin, who was stood behind Frampton when the punch landed, started to count. From Loughlin's point of view, it was a punch that dropped Frampton. Replays showed that it could have been ruled a legitimate slip. Frampton and Warren both stated that there would be another fight in the Spring of 2018, followed by a Summer fight at Windsor Park.

==== Frampton vs. Donaire ====
In December 2017, Frank Warren announced Frampton would next fight on 7 April 2018 in Belfast with former four-weight world champion Nonito Donaire (38–4, 24 KOs) as a potential opponent. Negotiations began on 19 December between Donaire's promoter Richard Schaefer and Frank Warren. On 21 December, the fight was officially announced by Frank Warren via the BoxNation Facebook page to take place on 21 April 2018 at the SSE Arena, Belfast. A month before the fight, it was announced that the WBO interim title would be at stake.

In a close fight Frampton beat Donaire via controversial Unanimous decision. All three judges scored the fight 117–111 for Frampton. Frampton spend most of the fight on the backfoot. In the second half of the fight, Donaire had more success, hurting Frampton on a number of occasions, landing a hard left hook in round eleven. Donaire was cut over his right after an accidental clash of heads in round seven, with the referee failing to call a time-out. After the fight, Frampton said on live television, "I didn't have to get involved in a fight there, as you saw in the last round Nonito Donaire is a dangerous motherfucker." According to CompuBox Stats, Frampton landed 164 of 557 punches thrown (29.4%) and Donaire landed 104 of his 447 thrown (23.3%).

==== Frampton vs. Jackson ====
On 1 May 2018, promoter Frank Warren announced that Windsor Park in Belfast had been booked for Frampton's next fight on 18 August. Although a big name was targeted, Frampton confirmed it would be unlikely. He also stated it would not be a world title fight. After former heavyweight world champion Tyson Fury defeated Sefer Seferi in his comeback fight on 9 June, Warren announced that Fury would also appear on the undercard. On 18 June, Frampton's opponent was confirmed to be unbeaten 33-year-old Australian boxer Luke Jackson (16–0, 7 KOs), in a bout which would see Frampton defend his WBO interim belt. A professional since 2013, Jackson was undefeated in 16 fights going into the fight. Jackson came in light at 124.7 pounds. Frampton had to lose his shorts to make the featherweight limit of 126 pounds.

In front of 24,000 fans, Frampton dominated Jackson in stopping him in round 9 after his corner threw in the towel. The fight was stopped at 1 minute and 21 seconds of the round. Frampton controlled the fight from the start and eventually put Jackson down with a body shot late in round 8. Jackson got up but continued to take shots. Jackson had little success. After the fight, Frampton said, “This was unreal. The atmosphere was special, the crowd was fantastic and they made my dream come true. It was unbelievable from start to finish.” With the win, Frampton retained the WBO interim title. It was also Frampton's first stoppage win in seven fights, since 2015. It was revealed a few days later that Jackson had ruptured his left ear drum in round 3 and his right ear drum in round 6. In a picture posted by Jackson, his right eye was swollen shut. Although he wanted to finish the fight, he respected his team's decision to stop the fight.

==== Frampton vs. Warrington ====
Immediately after Frampton's win over Jackson, Warren announced that Frampton would be challenging IBF featherweight champion Josh Warrington, who was also in attendance and entered the ring. Warren announced the fight would take place in December 2018 and shown live and exclusive on BT Sport Box Office, BT's new pay-per-view platform. On 28 August, Boxing Scene reported a press conference would take place in the coming weeks with the fight likely to take place at the Manchester Arena. Warren wanted the fight to take place in a stadium, however did not want any mandatories to get in the way as a stadium fight would likely take place in Spring 2019. It was reported that Frampton would earn around £2 million for the fight. On 15 September, the fight was officially announced to take place at the Manchester Arena on 22 December 2018. Warrington weighed 125.6 pounds and Frampton came in slightly heavier at 125.9 pounds, both successfully making the featherweight limit. Frampton lost the fight by unanimous decision. The judges scored the fight 116–112, 116–112 and 116–113 in favor of Warrington.

=== Super featherweight ===
==== Frampton vs. McCreary ====
His first fight following the loss to Warrington was scheduled for 10 August 2019, against Emmanuel Dominguez. However, Frampton was forced to withdraw from the fight after a large concrete ornament accidentally struck his left hand, fracturing his metacarpal. After his hand healed, he moved up in weight, facing Tyler McCreary on 30 November at the Cosmopolitan of Las Vegas. Initially, he was set to face former super bantamweight champion Isaac Dogboe, but Dogboe pulled out, referencing unspecified reasons.

Frampton came out as the aggressor from the opening bell, forcing McCreary on the defensive. In the sixth round, Frampton scored a knockdown with a left-right combination to the body of his opponent, forcing him to go down to the canvas on one knee. McCreary was back on his feet at the count of nine to continue the fight. In the ninth, Frampton landed two left hooks to the body, forcing McCreary to again take a knee. He again beat the referee's count to see out the remainder of the fight on his feet. After the ten-round contest was complete, Frampton was announced as the winner by unanimous decision, with all three judges scoring the bout 100–88. In the post-fight interview, when asked about a potential match up with WBO junior-lightweight champion Jamel Herring, who was sitting ringside, Frampton said, "I know he's a champ. I just want to fight for a world title next. I want to be involved in big fights. I would love the opportunity to fight Jamel. I'm not the champion. He's the champion."

==== Frampton vs. Traynor ====
His next fight was scheduled to take place in Belfast on 13 June 2020, against WBO champion Jamel Herring. The bout was subsequently postponed due to the COVID-19 pandemic. With no immediate date in sight, both fighters opted for a stay-busy fight.

Frampton's stay-busy fight was scheduled for 15 August 2020, against Armenian opponent Vahram Vardanyan at the York Hall. After Vardanyan was unable to secure a visa to enter the UK, former British featherweight title challenger Darren Traynor was brought in as a late replacement. Frampton dropped his much bigger opponent to the canvas with a left hook to the body in round six. In the seventh, Frampton continued his attack to the body, causing Traynor to quit on his feet after another left hook landed. With the win, Frampton moved one step closer to a proposed fight with Herring, with the last remaining obstacle being Herrings upcoming fight against Jonathan Oquendo.

=== Retirement ===
==== Frampton vs. Herring ====
After Herring defeated Oquendo in September, the WBO ordered Herring to face his mandatory challenger Shakur Stevenson before January 2021, putting the long-proposed fight with Frampton in jeopardy. The following month, the WBO gave Herring an exception to face Frampton in a voluntary defence. In January 2021, it was announced that the bout would finally take place in London on 27 February. However, after Frampton suffered a hand injury the bout was again postponed to 4 April, with the location changing to Dubai. Frampton was ranked #3 by the WBO at super featherweight. On the night, Frampton caused a cut to open above Herrings right eye in the fourth round. In the fifth, Frampton was knocked to the canvas by a straight left hand. Frampton was knocked down for a second time in the sixth round, this time from a left uppercut. Frampton made it back to his feet on unsteady legs before the referee's count of ten, only to be met with a flurry of punches from Herring, prompting Frampton's trainer to throw in the towel to hand Frampton a sixth-round technical knockout loss.

In the post-fight interview, Frampton announced his retirement, saying, "I said before the fight that I'd retire if I lost. That's exactly what I'm going to do. I've been away too long. I missed them growing up, my own kids. I want to give my life to my family. Boxing's been good to me, it's also been bad to me in recent years. I've enjoyed the best years of my career and now I just want to go home to my beautiful wife and kids."

== Legacy ==
Hailing from Belfast, a city known for its troubled history, Frampton wanted to be remembered like Barry McGuigan, his former manager, who was seen as a symbol of peace during his fighting days. In 2014, McGuigan said: "There I was, a Catholic guy from the south boxing right in the heart of loyalist Belfast with the Troubles at their worst. We beat the East Germans, my dad got up and sang and it was a brilliant night. Boxing was the one thing then that could unify people." Frampton said in 2015: "I want to be a legend. Honestly, that's what I want to be, a legend in Irish sport. I think it's coming up to 30 years since Barry won his world title in Loftus Road against Pedroza and people are still talking about it. I want to be like that 30 years from now – people are talking about my fights with guys like Chris Avalos and Kiko Martinez in the pubs all over Ireland. That's what I intend to do. I want to create a legacy. I want to keep beating big names. I want to get big fights, bring them back to Belfast as much as possible, and keep winning." Speaking to the BBC, McGuigan said "Carl is doing what I did. He's a beacon for peace and reconciliation and represents the future of Northern Ireland."

In 2014, McGuigan said Frampton "could end up as the best Irish fighter there has ever been. He can go to featherweight and super-featherweight. I don't know who the greatest Irish fighter is but if he gets the right fights he can really go as far as he wants to go." As a fighter, McGuigan was known for wearing a Dove on his shorts, as a representation of peace. He also had no national anthem played at his fights, he took up dual Irish-British citizenship which allowed him to fight for British Domestic titles, and he married a Protestant woman, all of which had huge significance at the time. Frampton also had a large following of die-hard fans from both Catholic and Protestant backgrounds who attended his fights in large numbers.

== Barry McGuigan litigation ==
Frampton's relationship with Barry McGuigan, who had managed and promoted him, ended in August 2017 in the wake of Frampton's scheduled bout against Andrés Gutiérrez being cancelled. In November 2017, Cyclone Promotions lodged papers at the High Court of Justice in London against Frampton for alleged breach of contract. In February 2018, Frampton counter sued Cyclone Promotions and Barry McGuigan in relation to earnings from previous fights, alleging issues such as breach of fiduciary duties, breach of trust, misrepresentation and negligence. Frampton told a court hearing he became suspicious of the McGuigan's in 2016 after discovering they had been using a business account for general expenses, and that money from ticket sales from his fights had been deposited into Barry McGuigan's own personal bank account.

In September 2020, Frampton's lawyers asserted to the Belfast High Court that Cyclone Promotions had withheld earnings from purse fees, broadcasting rights, ticket sales and merchandising income from their client. Frampton was nominated a director of a Northern Ireland-based company in 2013, and he was promised a 30 per cent share of the profits by McGuigan. However, in the summer of 2017 authorities contacted Frampton to demand £397,000 in unpaid VAT from the company, and an examination of financial records showed members of the McGuigan family had attempted to claim thousands of pounds worth of living expenses (such as supermarket and petrol station bills) from the company also. Under cross examination from McGuigan's lawyers, Frampton denied he was being greedy by seeking £6 million in damages, and told the court that the figures in his statement of claim were the result of an investigation by forensic accountants. Frampton also revealed that McGuigan and his son Blain had launched claims of almost £4 million against him for leaving Cyclone Promotions.

McGuigan told the court that he one regarded Frampton as like a member of his own family, highlighting how he paid for his expenses early in his career and invited him to stay at his house in England, and asserted that Frampton's success in boxing was at the forefront of his efforts on a daily basis while he was under his management. McGuigan also denied exploiting his relationship for his own benefit, adding that he was in no position to promise any percentage of profits. McGuigan went onto claim his main objectives were to make Frampton a world champion and earn millions of dollars in prize money, going onto achieving both as his manager. McGuigan told the court their relationship began to deteriorate in the run up to the Gutierrez fight when Frampton failed to make the weight, which McGuigan attributed to ill-discipline on Frampton's part. Frampton's barrister revealed that McGuigan had been disqualified as a company director in 1996, with one of the reasons cited as McGuigan paying his personal bills out of the official company bank account. When pressed as to why a number of companies McGuigan was involved with made losses during his time managing Frampton, the reply was he "didn't do the finances" but rather concentrated on the boxing aspect of business. It was also revealed that celebrities such as Rory McIlroy had been charged for VIP tickets to Frampton's fights without his knowledge, which McGuigan suggested were purchases for friends and family rather than the VIPs themselves. Blain McGuigan, who had worked for Cyclone Promotions as a promoter, denied that any portion of Frampton's earnings were hidden from him, telling the court that he was kept well involved of all financial decisions. Blain McGuigan also denied in early 2017 purposely deleting Cyclone Promotions emails in order to destroy information about Frampton's fights that could be useful to his lawyers, asserting that the company was migrating from Gmail to a Microsoft Outlook account and he was simply freeing up space from redundant email threads.

However, the court was informed on 9 November 2020 that over 10,000 emails had been recovered from Cyclone Promotions email servers the previous week, and the trial was adjourned to allow Frampton's legal team to analyze their contents. The matter was finally resolved out of court via confidential settlement on 12 November 2020. Frampton was quoted afterwards as being "extremely happy" with the terms of the settlement. McGuigan later released a statement saying he was satisfied with the settlement, adding it was reached without a judgment of any kind on the merits of either side's case.

== Professional boxing record ==
31 fights	28 wins	3 losses
By knockout	16	1
By decision	12	2

No.	Result	Record	Opponent	Type	Round	Date	Location	Notes
31	Loss	28–3	Jamel Herring	TKO	6 (12), 1:40	3 Apr 2021	The Rotunda Caesars Palace Bluewaters, Dubai, UAE	For WBO junior-lightweight title
30	Win	28–2	Darren Traynor	TKO	7 (10), 1:00	15 Aug 2020	York Hall, London, England	
29	Win	27–2	Tyler McCreary	UD	10	30 Nov 2019	Cosmopolitan of Las Vegas, Paradise, Nevada, US	
28	Loss	26–2	Josh Warrington	UD	12	22 Dec 2018	Manchester Arena, Manchester, England	For IBF featherweight title
27	Win	26–1	Luke Jackson	TKO	9 (12), 1:21	18 Aug 2018	Windsor Park, Belfast, Northern Ireland	Retained WBO interim featherweight title
26	Win	25–1	Nonito Donaire	UD	12	21 Apr 2018	SSE Arena, Belfast, Northern Ireland	Won vacant WBO interim featherweight title
25	Win	24–1	Horacio García	UD	10	18 Nov 2017	SSE Arena, Belfast, Northern Ireland	
24	Loss	23–1	Léo Santa Cruz	MD	12	28 Jan 2017	MGM Grand Garden Arena, Paradise, Nevada, US	Lost WBA (Super) featherweight title
23	Win	23–0	Léo Santa Cruz	MD	12	30 Jul 2016	Barclays Center, New York City, New York, US	Won WBA (Super) featherweight title
22	Win	22–0	Scott Quigg	SD	12	27 Feb 2016	Manchester Arena, Manchester, England	Retained IBF super-bantamweight title; Won WBA (super) super-bantamweight title
21	Win	21–0	Alejandro González Jr.	UD	12	18 Jul 2015	Don Haskins Center, El Paso, Texas, US	Retained IBF super-bantamweight title
20	Win	20–0	Chris Avalos	TKO	5 (12), 1:33	28 Feb 2015	Odyssey Arena, Belfast, Northern Ireland	Retained IBF super-bantamweight title
19	Win	19–0	Kiko Martínez	UD	12	6 Sep 2014	Titanic Quarter, Belfast, Northern Ireland	Won IBF super-bantamweight title
18	Win	18–0	Hugo Cázares	KO	2 (12), 1:38	4 Apr 2014	Odyssey Arena, Belfast, Northern Ireland	
17	Win	17–0	Jeremy Parodi	KO	6 (12), 2:59	19 Oct 2013	Odyssey Arena, Belfast, Northern Ireland	Retained European and IBF Inter-Continental super-bantamweight titles
16	Win	16–0	Kiko Martínez	TKO	9 (12), 2:46	9 Feb 2013	Odyssey Arena, Belfast, Northern Ireland	Won European super-bantamweight title; Retained IBF Inter-Continental super-bantamweight title
15	Win	15–0	Steve Molitor	TKO	6 (12), 2:21	22 Sep 2012	Odyssey Arena, Belfast, Northern Ireland	Retained Commonwealth and IBF Inter-Continental super-bantamweight titles
14	Win	14–0	Raúl Hirales Jr.	UD	12	26 May 2012	Capital FM Arena, Nottingham, England	Won vacant IBF Inter-Continental super-bantamweight title
13	Win	13–0	Prosper Ankrah	KO	2 (12), 2:45	17 Mar 2012	Motorpoint Arena, Sheffield, England	Retained Commonwealth super-bantamweight title
12	Win	12–0	Kris Hughes	TKO	7 (12), 0:48	28 Jan 2012	York Hall, London, England	Retained Commonwealth super-bantamweight title
11	Win	11–0	Mark Quon	TKO	4 (12), 1:11	10 Sep 2011	Odyssey Arena, Belfast, Northern Ireland	Won vacant Commonwealth super-bantamweight title
10	Win	10–0	Robbie Turley	UD	10	4 Jun 2011	Motorpoint Arena, Cardiff, Wales	Retained Celtic super-bantamweight title
9	Win	9–0	Oscar Chacin	TKO	4 (6), 2:20	5 Mar 2011	Leisure Centre, Huddersfield, England	
8	Win	8–0	Gavin Reid	TKO	2 (10), 2:29	3 Dec 2010	Ulster Hall, Belfast, Northern Ireland	Won vacant Celtic super-bantamweight title
7	Win	7–0	Yuriy Voronin	TKO	3 (8), 2:43	18 Sep 2010	Ulster Hall, Belfast, Northern Ireland	
6	Win	6–0	Ian Bailey	UD	6	11 Jun 2010	King's Hall, Belfast, Northern Ireland	
5	Win	5–0	Istvan Szabo	TKO	1 (6), 0:48	5 Mar 2010	Leisure Centre, Huddersfield, England	
4	Win	4–0	Yoan Boyeaux	UD	4	12 Feb 2010	York Hall, London, England	
3	Win	3–0	Ignac Kassai	TKO	3 (4), 1:26	6 Nov 2009	Meadowbank Sports Arena, Magherafelt, Northern Ireland	
2	Win	2–0	Yannis Lakrout	UD	4	4 Sep 2009	Eston Sports Academy, Teesville, England	
1	Win	1–0	Sandor Szinavel	TKO	2 (4), 2:03	12 Jun 2009	Liverpool Olympia, Liverpool, England	

== Titles in boxing ==
=== Major world titles ===
- IBF super-bantamweight champion (122 lbs)
- WBA (Unified) super-bantamweight champion (122 lbs)
- WBA (Super) featherweight champion (126 lbs)

=== Interim world titles ===
- WBO interim featherweight champion (126 lbs)

=== Regional/International titles ===
- Celtic super-bantamweight champion (122 lbs)
- Commonwealth super-bantamweight champion (122 lbs)
- IBF Inter-Continental super-bantamweight champion (122 lbs)
- European super-bantamweight champion (122 lbs)

== Boxing awards ==
- Ring Magazine Fighter of the Year: 2016
- Sugar Ray Robinson Award: 2016

Sporting positions
Regional boxing titles
New title	Celtic super-bantamweight champion 3 December 2010 – September 2011; Vacated	Vacant Title next held by Robbie Turley
Vacant Title last held by Jason Booth	Commonwealth super-bantamweight champion 10 September 2011 – May 2014; Vacated	Vacant Title next held by Kid Galahad
Vacant Title last held by Heriberto Ruiz	IBF Inter-Continental super-bantamweight champion 26 May 2012 – April 2014; Vacated	Vacant Title next held by Albert Pagara
Preceded by Kiko Martínez	European super-bantamweight champion 9 February 2013 – March 2014; Vacated	Vacant Title next held by Kid Galahad
World boxing titles
Preceded by Kiko Martínez	IBF super-bantamweight champion 6 September 2014 – 28 April 2016; Vacated	Vacant Title next held by Jonathan Guzmán
Preceded by Scott Quigg as Champion	WBA super-bantamweight champion Unified title 27 February 2016 – 7 April 2016; Stripped	Vacant Title next held by Guillermo Rigondeaux as Super champion
Preceded by Léo Santa Cruz	WBA featherweight champion Super title 30 July 2016 – 29 January 2017	Succeeded by Léo Santa Cruz
Vacant Title last held by Juan Manuel Márquez	WBO featherweight champion Interim title 21 April 2018 – December 2018	Vacant
Awards
Previous: Tyson Fury	The Ring Fighter of the Year; 2016	Next: Vasyl Lomachenko
Previous: Floyd Mayweather Jr.	BWAA Fighter of the Year; 2016	Next: Vasyl Lomachenko
Previous: Canelo Álvarez	ESPN Fighter of the Year; 2016	Next: Terence Crawford
Previous: Keith Thurman	PBC Fighter of the Year; 2016	Next: Jermell Charlo
