= Kiko Martínez =

Spanish boxer (born 1986)

Personal information
- Nickname: La Sensación ("The Sensation")
- Born: Francisco Martínez Sánchez; 7 March 1986 (age 40) Elche, Baix Vinalopó, Alicante, Spain
- Height: 165 cm (5 ft 5 in)
- Weight: Super bantamweight; Featherweight; Super featherweight

Boxing career
- Reach: 168 cm (66 in)
- Stance: Orthodox

Boxing record
- Total fights: 58
- Wins: 44
- Win by KO: 31
- Losses: 12
- Draws: 2

Francisco "Kiko" Martínez Sánchez (born 7 March 1986) is a Spanish former professional boxer who competed from 2004 to 2023. He is a world champion in two weight classes, having previously held the International Boxing Federation (IBF) super-bantamweight title from 2013 to 2014, and the IBF featherweight title from 2021 to 2022. At regional level, he held the European super-bantamweight title three times between 2007 and 2013, and the European featherweight title twice in 2018 and 2022 respectively.

== Amateur career ==
Martínez fought extensively as an amateur. He fought 40 amateur bouts and never lost, with 38 of those victories being by knockout. Martinez stated that he "could have gone to the Olympics – the Spanish amateur boxing association wanted me to sign a four-year contract but I wanted to turn professional".

== Professional career ==
Martínez turned professional on 11 June 2004, defeating David Casero by knockout in the third round on a card that included Javier Castillejo.

Martínez went on to win all of his first 11 fights with each victory coming via a knockout within four rounds.

=== European super-bantamweight champion ===
On 10 March 2006, Martínez faced Frenchman Salem Bouaita for his EBU European Union super bantamweight title at Pabellón de Elche in Spain. This was Martinez's first fight which went past four rounds and the fight went the full scheduled 10 rounds. Martínez was given a unanimous points win and won the title.

Martínez won a further four fights and became the mandatory challenger European super bantamweight title.

==== Martínez vs. Dunne ====
The EBU made Martinez the mandatory challenger for Irish fighter, Bernard Dunne's European super bantamweight title.

Martínez and Dunne clashed on 25 August 2007 at the Point Theatre, Dublin, Ireland. This was Martinez's first fight outside of Spain and despite being the challenger he was confident of victory. Martinez stated before the fight that he "might be a little shorter than Bernard but I'm 5 foot 4 inches of a headache for him".

On the night of the fight the Point Depot filled with expectant Irish boxing fans and the fight was beamed live on RTÉ, the Irish national television broadcaster. The fight started with Dunne keeping his guard low and circling Martínez. However, Martínez quickly had Dunne on the canvas with an overhand right. Dunne appeared stunned and unaware of what had happened. Dunne beat the count but was floored twice more before the referee stopped the fight within only 90 seconds of round one.

The Martínez camp stated that they knew there would be a first round victory and that many of them had placed bets worth thousands of pounds with Irish bookmakers at odds of 66/1 that Martínez would win in the first round.

=== Controversy ===
Martínez had signed to fight another Irishman, the Las Vegas-based former WBC bantamweight champion, Wayne McCullough at Belfast's Kings Hall on 1 December 2007.

McCullough had not fought for over two years and the Kings Hall venue was sold out for the fight. It was agreed that the non-title fight would take place at 8 st 12 lb mark. However, on the day before the fight there was uproar during the weigh-in and the fight was cancelled amid chaotic scenes. McCullough had already contracted to fight at 2 lb over the 8 st 10 lb championship weight and he weighed in at 8 st 9 lb. However, Martínez failed to make the agreed weight and was 1.75 lb over the agreed weight.

Martínez was given a couple of hours to shed the excess weight, but did not return to weigh in again and the scales were closed by a BBBofC official. A furious McCullough stated "I couldn't believe it. He comes in over the weight and then after being asked to take it off he just sits there and does nothing. I just can't believe what has happened. I was ready to fight and ready to win and he comes in that much over the weight.".

=== First loss ===
Kiko Martínez made his first defence of the EBU super bantamweight title against Rendall Munroe; a title he had successfully taken from Bernard Dunne in August 2007. The fight against Munroe took place at the Harvey Hadden Leisure Centre, Nottingham on 7 March 2008.

The fight turned out to be fairly uneventful as Munroe countered Martínez by blocking and counterpunching, without ever troubling the champion. Meanwhile, Martinez failed to land the big shots that had seen him stop Bernard Dunne. The fight went the full 12 rounds, with Munroe winning by a majority points decision.

=== Martínez vs. Frampton ===
On February 9, 2013, Martínez faced Carl Frampton in front of Frampton's home fans in the Odyssey Arena in Belfast. Martinez lost by TKO in Round 9 losing the European Super-bantamweight title. Carl Frampton and Kiko fought again in September 2014 in Northern Ireland.

“Since the 9th of February 2013, when I get up at five in the morning to go training, I remember him. For me, to defeat him is a greater motivation than the chance to unify the belts," said Martinez.

"I will never forget that night and I will prove that it was just a bad day for me. I am world champion now and my legacy will be bigger for facing Carl Frampton.”

=== IBF super-bantamweight champion ===
On 17 August 2013 in New Jersey, Martínez beat Jonatan Romero by TKO to win the IBF Super Bantamweight title. After 2 successful defenses, Martinez then had a rematch with Carl Frampton resulting in Martinez losing his IBF belt.

Since then Martinez has had ten wins and 5 losses. Three of these losses were against World Champions Scott Quigg, Leo Santa Cruz and Gary Russell Jr.

== Professional boxing record ==
58 fights	44 wins	12 losses
By knockout	31	5
By decision	13	7
Draws	2	

No.	Result	Record	Opponent	Type	Round, time	Date	Location	Notes
58	Loss	44–12–2	Reiya Abe	UD	12	8 Apr 2023	Ariake Arena, Tokyo, Japan	
57	Win	44–11–2	Jordan Gill	TKO	4 (12), 2:44	29 Oct 2022	Wembley Arena, London, England	Won European featherweight title
56	Loss	43–11–2	Josh Warrington	TKO	7 (12), 2:12	26 Mar 2022	First Direct Arena, Leeds, England	Lost IBF featherweight title
55	Win	43–10–2	Kid Galahad	KO	6 (12), 0:06	13 Nov 2021	Utilita Arena Sheffield, Sheffield, England	Won IBF featherweight title
54	Win	42–10–2	Jayro Duran	UD	8	11 Sep 2021	Pavelló de la Vall d'Hebron, Barcelona, Spain	
53	Loss	41–10–2	Zelfa Barrett	UD	12	13 Feb 2021	The SSE Arena, London, England	For IBF Inter-Continental junior-lightweight title
52	Win	41–9–2	Noe Martinez Raygoza	TKO	3 (8), 2:09	21 Aug 2020	El Malecon, Torrelavega, Spain	
51	Win	40–9–2	Alexander Cazares	UD	10	7 Dec 2019	Polideportivo Vicente Trueba, Torrelavega, Spain	
50	Loss	39–9–2	Gary Russell Jr.	TKO	5 (12), 2:52	18 May 2019	Barclays Center, New York City, New York, U.S.	For WBC featherweight title
49	Win	39–8–2	Marc Vidal	UD	12	27 Oct 2018	Polideportivo Fernando Martin, Fuenlabrada, Spain	Won European featherweight title
48	Draw	38–8–2	Marc Vidal	TD	3 (12), 3:00	19 May 2018	Plaza de Toros, Benidorm, Spain	For European featherweight title; TD after Vidal was cut
47	Win	38–8–1	Lorenzo Parra	KO	3 (8), 2:55	26 Aug 2017	Plaza de Toros, Benidorm, Spain	
46	Win	37–8–1	Franklin Varela	TKO	4 (8), 1:40	14 Jul 2017	Palacio de Deportes, Benidorm, Spain	
45	Loss	36–8–1	Josh Warrington	MD	12	13 May 2017	First Direct Arena, Leeds, England	For WBC International featherweight title
44	Win	36–7–1	Leonel Hernandez	PTS	8	25 Nov 2016	Palacio de los Deportes, Gijón, Spain	
43	Draw	35–7–1	Eusebio Osejo	SD	8	23 Jul 2016	Palacio de Deportes, Benidorm, Spain	
42	Loss	35–7	Léo Santa Cruz	TKO	5 (12), 2:09	27 Feb 2016	Honda Center, Anaheim, California, US	For WBA (Super) featherweight title
41	Win	35–6	Miguel Gonzalez	TKO	4 (8), 1:39	12 Dec 2015	Pavelló de la Vall d'Hebron, Barcelona, Spain	
40	Win	34–6	Everth Briceno	UD	8	14 Nov 2015	Gran Canaria Arena, Las Palmas, Spain	
39	Win	33–6	Herald Molina	KO	1 (8), 0:54	23 Oct 2015	Pabellón Pilar Fernández Valderrama, Valladolid, Spain	
38	Loss	32–6	Scott Quigg	TKO	2 (12), 1:02	18 Jul 2015	Manchester Arena, Manchester, England	For WBA (Regular) super-bantamweight title
37	Win	32–5	George Gachechiladze	TKO	2 (8), 3:00	12 Dec 2014	Pavelló de la Vall d'Hebron, Barcelona, Spain	
36	Loss	31–5	Carl Frampton	UD	12	6 Sep 2014	Titanic Quarter, Belfast, Northern Ireland	Lost IBF super-bantamweight title
35	Win	31–4	Hozumi Hasegawa	TKO	7 (12), 1:20	23 Apr 2014	Osaka-jō Hall, Osaka, Japan	Retained IBF super-bantamweight title
34	Win	30–4	Jeffrey Mathebula	KO	9 (12), 2:05	21 Dec 2013	Pabellón Esperanza Lag, Elche, Spain	Retained IBF super-bantamweight title
33	Win	29–4	Jonatan Romero	TKO	6 (12), 2:40	17 Aug 2013	Revel Casino Hotel, Atlantic City, New Jersey, US	Won IBF super-bantamweight title
32	Win	28–4	Damian David Mariano	TKO	2 (8), 1:41	27 Apr 2013	José Amalfitani Stadium, Buenos Aires, Argentina	Won vacant WBC Latino super-bantamweight title
31	Loss	27–4	Carl Frampton	TKO	9 (12), 2:46	9 Feb 2013	Odyssey Arena, Belfast, Northern Ireland	Lost European super-bantamweight title; For IBF Inter-Continental super-bantamweight title
30	Win	27–3	Dougie Curran	PTS	6	21 Jul 2012	The Emerald Roadhouse, Belfast, Northern Ireland	
29	Win	26–3	Arsen Martirosian	TKO	12 (12), 0:35	9 Mar 2012	Palais des Sports de Gerland, Lyon, France	Retained European super-bantamweight title
28	Win	25–3	Jason Booth	KO	10 (12), 2:22	15 Apr 2011	La Cubierta, Leganés, Spain	Won vacant European super-bantamweight title
27	Win	24–3	Oscar Chacin	UD	6	18 Feb 2011	Daya Nueva, Spain	
26	Win	23–3	Arsen Martirosian	UD	12	11 Sep 2010	National Stadium, Dublin, Ireland	Won vacant European super-bantamweight title
25	Win	22–3	Feliciano Dario Azuaga	TKO	3 (12), 1:12	16 Apr 2010	Valladolid, Spain	Won vacant WBO Latino interim super-bantamweight title
24	Win	21–3	Said Chichti	KO	1 (6), 2:07	11 Dec 2009	Daya Nueva, Spain	
23	Loss	20–3	Takalani Ndlovu	UD	12	25 Sep 2009	Nasrec Indoor Arena, Johannesburg, South Africa	
22	Loss	20–2	Rendall Munroe	UD	12	27 Feb 2009	Metrodome, Barnsley, England	For European super-bantamweight title
21	Win	20–1	Gheorghe Ghiompirica	PTS	6	18 Dec 2008	City University, Dublin, Ireland	
20	Win	19–1	Silviu Lupu	TKO	1 (10), 1:10	12 Aug 2008	Plaza de Toros, Benidorm, Spain	
19	Win	18–1	Lante Addy	PTS	8	5 Jul 2008	National Basketball Arena, Dublin, Ireland	
18	Loss	17–1	Rendall Munroe	MD	12	7 Mar 2008	Harvey Hadden Sports Village, Nottingham, England	Lost European super-bantamweight title
17	Win	17–0	Bernard Dunne	TKO	1 (12), 1:26	25 Aug 2007	Point Theatre, Dublin, Ireland	Won European super-bantamweight title
16	Win	16–0	Andrei Florin	TKO	1 (8), 3:00	18 Mar 2007	Polideportivo Municipal, Catral, Spain	
15	Win	15–0	Edison Torres	UD	8	15 Dec 2006	Dolores, Spain	
14	Win	14–0	John Bikai	PTS	12	14 Jul 2006	Alicante, Spain	Retained European Union super-bantamweight title
13	Win	13–0	Andrei Florin	TKO	3 (6), 2:33	26 May 2006	Dolores, Spain	
12	Win	12–0	Salem Bouaita	UD	10	10 Mar 2006	Pabellón, Elche, Spain	Won European Union super-bantamweight title
11	Win	11–0	Peter Baláž	KO	1 (6), 1:38	25 Nov 2005	Dolores, Spain	
10	Win	10–0	Manuel Sequera	KO	2 (6), 2:15	14 Oct 2005	Dolores, Spain	
9	Win	9–0	Manuel Gomes	KO	4 (12), 2:01	15 Jul 2005	Benidorm, Spain	
8	Win	8–0	Sergei Nikitin	TKO	2 (8), 1:02	6 May 2005	Alicante, Spain	
7	Win	7–0	Frederic Bonifai	TKO	2 (8), 2:45	4 Mar 2005	León, Spain	
6	Win	6–0	Nikolai Mihailov	TKO	4 (6), 2:44	4 Feb 2005	Alcalá de Henares, Spain	
5	Win	5–0	Julio Vargas	TKO	4 (6), 0:11	19 Nov 2004	Torrevieja, Spain	
4	Win	4–0	Juan Garcia Martin	TKO	3 (6), 2:59	15 Oct 2004	Madrid, Spain	
3	Win	3–0	Cristiano Andres Oliveira	KO	1 (4), 2:39	10 Sep 2004	Madrid, Spain	
2	Win	2–0	Irimiea Ion	TKO	3 (4), 1:13	24 Jul 2004	Benidorm, Spain	
1	Win	1–0	David Casero	TKO	3 (4), 2:14	11 Jun 2004	La Cubierta, Leganés, Spain	

== Titles in boxing ==
=== Major world titles ===
- IBF super-bantamweight champion (122 lbs)
- IBF featherweight champion (126 lbs)

=== Regional/International titles ===
- European Union super-bantamweight champion (122 lbs)
- European super-bantamweight champion (122 lbs) (3x)
- WBO Latino interim super-bantamweight champion (122 lbs)
- WBC Latino super-bantamweight champion (122 lbs)
- European featherweight champion (126 lbs) (2x)

== See also ==
- List of world super-bantamweight boxing champions
- List of world featherweight boxing champions

Sporting positions
Regional boxing titles
Preceded by Salem Bouaita	European Union super-bantamweight champion 10 March 2006 – March 2007; Vacated	Vacant Title next held by Salem Bouaita
Preceded by Bernard Dunne	European super-bantamweight champion 25 August 2007 – 7 March 2008	Succeeded by Rendall Munroe
Vacant Title last held by Wilfredo Vázquez Jr.	WBO Latino super-bantamweight champion Interim title 16 April 2010 – September 2010; Vacated	Vacant Title next held by Alex De Oliveira
Vacant Title last held by Rendall Munroe	European super-bantamweight champion 11 September 2010 – November 2010; Vacated	Vacant Title next held by Willie Casey
Vacant Title last held by Willie Casey	European super-bantamweight champion 15 April 2011 – 9 February 2013	Succeeded by Carl Frampton
Vacant Title last held by Lucas Antonio Carranza	WBC Latino super-bantamweight champion 27 April 2013 – August 2013; Vacated	Succeeded by Luis Emanuel Cusolito promoted from interim status
Preceded by Marc Vidal	European featherweight champion 27 October 2018 – April 2019 vacated	Vacant Title next held by Andoni Gago
Preceded by Jordan Gill	European featherweight champion 29 October 2022 – present	Incumbent
World boxing titles
Preceded by Jonatan Romero	IBF super-bantamweight champion 17 August 2013 – 6 September 2014	Succeeded by Carl Frampton
Preceded by Kid Galahad	IBF featherweight champion 13 November 2021 – 26 March 2022	Succeeded by Josh Warrington
