= Rendall Munroe =

English boxer (born 1980)

Personal information
- Nicknames: The Binman, 2 Tone
- Born: 1 June 1980 (age 46) Leicester, Leicestershire, England
- Height: 5 ft 6 in (168 cm)
- Weight: Super-bantamweight, Featherweight

Boxing career
- Reach: 69.5 in (177 cm)
- Stance: Southpaw

Boxing record
- Total fights: 34
- Wins: 28
- Win by KO: 11
- Losses: 5
- Draws: 1
- No contests: 0

Rendall Munroe (born 1 June 1980) is an English former professional boxer. He held the European, Commonwealth and English super-bantamweight titles. Known as 'The Boxing Binman' due to his dayjob as a binman, Munroe and his corner men used to make their ring walk wearing fluorescent yellow binman jackets.

== Career ==
=== Early stages, English title ===
With an amateur record of 30 wins and 10 losses, Munroe had his first professional fight on 20 September 2003, when he stopped Joel Viney in the third round at the Harvey Hadden Leisure Centre in Nottingham.

After 10 wins, he challenged Andy Morris for the British featherweight title but lost by unanimous decision in Edinburgh.

Munroe's first title win came three fights later when he beat Marc Callaghan for the vacant English super-bantamweight championship.

=== European and Commonwealth champion ===
Munroe defeated European super-bantamweight champion, Kiko Martínez, by majority decision again at the Harvey Hadden Leisure Centre on 7 March 2008.

He successfully defended the title three times during 2008, against Salem Bouaita, Arsen Martirosian, and Fabrizio Trotta.

On 27 February 2009 at Barnsley Metrodome, Munroe faced a rematch with Kiko Martínez, who had been installed as the mandatory challenger, and defeated the Spaniard once more, this time by unanimous decision.

On 2 May 2009, Munroe captured the Commonwealth title with a unanimous decision victory over Ghanaian boxer Isaac Nettey at Crowtree Leisure Centre in Sunderland.

Back at the Harvey Hadden Leisure Centre on 20 November 2009, he defeated Simone Maludrottu by unanimous decision to retain his European title.

=== World championship opportunity ===
On 23 April 2010 at Coventry Skydome, Munroe stopped Victor Terrazas in the ninth round of an eliminator to challenge WBC super-bantamweight champion Toshiaki Nishioka.

He lost to Nishioka by unanimous decision on 24 October 2010 at the Ryōgoku Kokugikan in Tokyo, Japan, with all three judges scoring the fight 119–109.

=== New promotor and first retirement ===
On 17 January 2011, Munroe received an Honoured Citizen Award in his home city of Leicester, from Lord Mayor Colin Hall, in recognition of his work in promoting the city.

In March 2011, Munroe, who had previously been promoted by Frank Maloney, signed an 18-month deal with Hatton Promotions for forthcoming fights, the first being at the MEN Arena where he captured the vacant WBA international super-bantamweight title with a unanimous decision over Andrei Isaeu on 16 April 2011.

Munroe fought against Scott Quigg for the WBA Interim super-bantamweight title at Manchester Velodrome on 16 June 2012. However, the fight was ruled a technical draw in the third round after Munroe suffered a cut over his right eye from an accidental clash of heads.

A rematch took place at Manchester Arena on 24 November 2012. Quigg won by stoppage in the sixth round.

On 13 December 2012, Munroe announced his retirement from the sport at a press conference at King Power Stadium in Leicester.

=== Comeback, title chances and second retirement ===
He made a return to the ring on 12 May 2013 with a first-round stoppage of Laszlo Fekete at Club Republic in Leicester.

Munroe challenged British featherweight champion Lee Selby at Cardiff International Arena on 1 February 2024 with the vacant European featherweight title also up for grabs. He lost by technical knockout in the sixth round.

On 19 April 2014, he took on Commonwealth featherweight title holder, Josh Warrington, at Manchester Arena. Munroe quit on his stool at the end of the seventh round. He announced his second, and final, retirement from professional boxing immediately after the fight.

== Professional boxing record ==
34 fights	28 wins	5 losses
By knockout	11	3
By decision	17	2
Draws	1	

No.	Result	Record	Opponent	Type	Round, time	Date	Location	Notes
34	Loss	28–5–1	Josh Warrington	RTD	7 (12), 3:00	19 Apr 2014	Phones 4u Arena, Manchester, England	For Commonwealth featherweight title
33	Win	28–4–1	Youssef al-Hamidi	PTS	4	29 Mar 2014	Winter Gardens, Blackpool, England	
32	Loss	27–4–1	Lee Selby	TKO	6 (12), 1:31	1 Feb 2014	Cardiff International Arena, Cardiff, Wales	For British and vacant European featherweight titles
31	Win	27–3–1	Pavels Senkovs	PTS	6	2 Nov 2013	Ice Arena, Kingston upon Hull, England	
30	Win	26–3–1	Andy Townend	PTS	10	28 Sep 2013	Doncaster Dome, Doncaster, England	
29	Win	25–3–1	László Fekete	TKO	1 (6), 1:41	12 May 2013	Club Republic, Leicester, England	
28	Loss	24–3–1	Scott Quigg	TKO	6 (12), 2:37	24 Nov 2012	Manchester Arena, Manchester, England	For vacant WBA interim super bantamweight title
27	Draw	24–2–1	Scott Quigg	TD	3 (12), 0:43	16 Jun 2012	Manchester Velodrome, Manchester, England	For vacant WBA interim super bantamweight title; Munroe cut from accidental headbutt
26	Win	24–2	José Saez	TKO	1 (8), 2:50	4 Feb 2012	De Vere Whites Hotel, Bolton, England	
25	Win	23–2	Ryuta Miyagi	PTS	10	24 Sep 2011	Ponds Forge Arena, Sheffield, England	
24	Win	22–2	Andrei Isaeu	UD	12	16 Apr 2011	M.E.N. Arena, Manchester, England	Won vacant WBA International super bantamweight title
23	Loss	21–2	Toshiaki Nishioka	UD	12	24 Oct 2010	Kokugikan, Tokyo, Japan	For WBC super bantamweight title
22	Win	21–1	Victor Terrazas	TKO	9 (12), 0:57	23 Apr 2010	Skydome, Coventry, England	
21	Win	20–1	Simone Maludrottu	UD	12	20 Nov 2009	Harvey Hadden Leisure Centre, Nottingham, England	Retained European super bantamweight title
20	Win	19–1	Isaac Nettey	UD	12	2 May 2009	Crowtree Leisure Centre, Sunderland, England	Won vacant Commonwealth super bantamweight title
19	Win	18–1	Kiko Martínez	UD	12	27 Feb 2009	Metrodome, Barnsley, England	Retained European super bantamweight title
18	Win	17–1	Fabrizio Trotta	TKO	5 (12), 1:27	18 Dec 2008	Dublin City University, Dublin, Ireland	Retained European super bantamweight title
17	Win	16–1	Arsen Martirosian	UD	12	5 Sep 2008	Harvey Hadden Leisure Centre, Nottingham, England	Retained European super bantamweight title
16	Win	15–1	Salem Bouaita	RTD	7 (12), 3:00	2 May 2008	Harvey Hadden Leisure Centre, Nottingham, England	Retained European super bantamweight title
15	Win	14–1	Kiko Martínez	MD	12	7 Mar 2008	Harvey Hadden Leisure Centre, Nottingham, England	Won European super bantamweight title
14	Win	13–1	Marc Callaghan	RTD	6 (10), 3:00	12 Oct 2007	Leisure Centre, Peterlee, England	Won vacant English super bantamweight title
13	Win	12–1	Dai Davies	TKO	5 (6), 1:03	13 Jul 2007	Metrodome, Barnsley, England	
12	Win	11–1	Gavin Deacon	PTS	6	13 Apr 2007	Leisure Centre, Altrincham, England	
11	Loss	10–1	Andy Morris	UD	12	29 Apr 2006	Meadowbank Sports Centre, Edinburgh, Scotland	For British featherweight title
10	Win	10–0	Jonathan Whiteman	TKO	2 (4), 2:56	28 Jan 2006	Nottingham Arena, Nottingham, England	
9	Win	9–0	Riaz Durgahed	PTS	6	2 Sep 2005	Heritage Hotel, Derby, England	
8	Win	8–0	Darren Broomhall	TKO	3 (6), 0:38	28 Jun 2005	Metrodome, Barnsley, England	
7	Win	7–0	David Kiilu	PTS	6	8 Oct 2004	Brentwood Centre, Brentwood, England	
6	Win	6–0	David Bailey	PTS	6	27 Sep 2004	Winter Gardens, Cleethorpes, England	
5	Win	5–0	Baz Carey	PTS	6	26 Apr 2004	Winter Gardens, Cleethorpes, England	
4	Win	4–0	Anthony Hanna	PTS	6	9 Apr 2014	Benn Hall, Rugby, England	
3	Win	3–0	Neil Read	TKO	1 (4), 1:23	14 Feb 2014	Harvey Hadden Leisure Center, Nottingham, England	
2	Win	2–0	John Paul Ryan	PTS	6	23 Nov 2003	Magna Centre, Rotherham, England	
1	Win	1–0	Joel Viney	TKO	3 (4)	20 Sep 2003	Harvey Hadden Leisure Centre, Nottingham, England	
