= Alejandro González Jr. =

Mexican boxer (1993–2016)

Personal information
- Nickname: La Cobríta
- Born: March 8, 1993 Zapopan, Jalisco, Mexico
- Died: December 9, 2016 (aged 23) Guadalajara, Jalisco, Mexico
- Height: 5 ft 7 in (170 cm)
- Weight: Bantamweight

Boxing career
- Reach: 67 in (170 cm)
- Stance: Orthodox

Boxing record
- Total fights: 31
- Wins: 25
- Win by KO: 15
- Losses: 3
- Draws: 3

Alejandro González Jr. (March 8, 1993 – December 9, 2016) was a Mexican professional boxer who challenged once for the IBF super bantamweight title. He was the son of former world champion Alejandro Martín González.

== Professional career ==
Between 2010 and 2016, Gonzalez Jr. compiled a 25-3-3 professional record. In February 2013 González knocked out 19-0 Hanzel Martinez in the second round in Tijuana to win the interim WBC Youth Silver bantamweight title, the only title he would win in his 31 bout career. In July 2015, Gonzalez Jr. knocked down 20-0 International Boxing Federation World Super Bantamweight Champion Carl Frampton twice in the first round of their world title bout, only to lose the 12-round decision. In his final ring appearance, Gonzalez Jr. had not won a fight in nearly two years when he fought to a 12-round draw with Hector Bobadilla in Guadalajara in October 2016 in a bout for the interim World Boxing Council FECOMBOX Super Bantamweight title.

== Death ==
González was shot to death in Guadalajara, Mexico, on December 9, 2016. Two others accompanying González in a Jeep van were killed, and one was believed to be his grandfather. ESPN Mexico called the shooting an execution.

== Professional boxing record ==
| 31 fights | 25 wins | 3 losses |
|---|---|---|
| By knockout | 15 | 0 |
| By decision | 10 | 3 |
| Draws | 3 | |

| Res. | Record | Opponent | Type | Round | Date | Location | Notes |
|---|---|---|---|---|---|---|---|
| Draw | 25–3–3 | (Mexico) Hector Esnar Bobadilla | MD | 12 | 2016-10-29 | Arena Coliseo, Guadalajara, Mexico | For interim WBC FECOMBOX super bantamweight title |
| Loss | 25–3–2 | (France) Karim Guerfi | UD | 10 | 2015-11-10 | (United States) Music Hall, Austin, Texas, U.S. | |
| Loss | 25–2–2 | (United Kingdom) Carl Frampton | UD | 12 | 2015-07-18 | (United States) Don Haskins Center, El Paso, Texas, U.S. | For IBF super bantamweight title |
| Win | 25–1–2 | (Mexico) Gonzalo Garcia | UD | 8 | 2014-12-13 | Pesquería, Mexico | |
| Win | 24–1–2 | (Mexico) Alem Robles | UD | 8 | 2014-09-20 | Tijuana, Mexico | |
| Win | 23–1–2 | (Mexico) Javier Franco | KO | 2 (8) | 2014-07-18 | Arena Tecate, Tijuana, Mexico | |
| Loss | 22–1–2 | (Mexico) Juan Alberto Rosas | TD | 9 (10) | 2014-04-05 | Arena Tecate, Tijuana, Mexico | |
| Win | 22–0–2 | (Mexico) Jose Carlos Vargas | KO | 2 (8) | 2013-11-22 | Forum Tecate, Tijuana, Mexico | |
| Win | 21–0–2 | (Mexico) Jose Cayetano | UD | 10 | 2013-08-03 | Arena Tecate, Tijuana, Mexico | |
| Win | 20–0–2 | (Mexico) Noe Martinez Raygoza | KO | 2 (8) | 2013-05-18 | Zitácuaro, Mexico | |
| Win | 19–0–2 | (Mexico) Alexander Acosta | KO | 4 (8) | 2013-03-09 | Guadalajara, Mexico | |
| Win | 18–0–2 | (Mexico) Hanzel Martinez | KO | 2 (10) | 2013-02-16 | Auditorio Municipal, Tijuana, Mexico | Won vacant WBC Youth Intercontinental bantamweight title |
| Win | 17–0–2 | (Mexico) Cesar Ramirez | KO | 2 (6) | 2012-11-24 | Tijuana, Mexico | |
| Win | 16–0–2 | (Mexico) Alvaro Calderon | KO | 1 (6) | 2012-09-29 | Hermosillo, Mexico | |
| Win | 15–0–2 | (Mexico) Heriberto Rivas | UD | 6 | 2012-08-11 | Guadalajara, Mexico | |
| Win | 14–0–2 | (Mexico) Leopoldo Gonzalez | TKO | 1 (6) | 2012-06-16 | (United States) Sun Bowl, El Paso, Texas, U.S. | |
| Win | 13–0–2 | (Mexico) Daniel Navarete | KO | 1 (6) | 2012-05-05 | Tijuana, Mexico | |
| Win | 12–0–2 | (Mexico) Martin Lopez | UD | 4 | 2012-01-21 | Guadalajara, Mexico | |
| Win | 11–0–2 | (Mexico) Sergio Nunez | TKO | 6 (6) | 2011-11-05 | Tijuana, Mexico | |
| Win | 10–0–2 | (Mexico) Manuel Armendariz | TKO | 2 (4) | 2011-10-08 | Tijuana, Mexico | |
| Win | 9–0–2 | (Mexico) Jose Carlos Lopez | TKO | 3 (6) | 2011-08-27 | Guadalajara, Mexico | |
| Win | 8–0–2 | (Mexico) Javier Estrada | KO | 3 (4) | 2011-06-18 | Toluca, Mexico | |
| Draw | 7–0–2 | (Mexico) Alem Robles | MD | 4 | 2011-05-14 | Los Mochis, Mexico | |
| Win | 7–0–1 | (Mexico) Martin Rodriguez | TKO | 4 (6) | 2011-04-02 | Mexicali, Mexico | |
| Win | 6–0–1 | (Mexico) Jairo Calvillo | TKO | 2 (4) | 2011-02-12 | Guadalajara, Mexico | |
| Win | 5–0–1 | (Mexico) Julio Vizarratea | UD | 4 | 2010-11-26 | Guadalajara, Mexico | |
| Win | 4–0–1 | (Mexico) Christian Aceves | SD | 4 | 2010-10-30 | Zapopan, Mexico | |
| Win | 3–0–1 | (Mexico) Victor Orozco | UD | 4 | 2010-09-04 | Guadalajara, Mexico | |
| Win | 2–0–1 | (Mexico) Fernando Arana | UD | 4 | 2010-07-16 | Guadalajara, Mexico | |
| Win | 1–0–1 | (Mexico) Francisco Javier Medina | UD | 4 | 2010-05-21 | Guadalajara, Mexico | |
| Draw | 0–0–1 | (Mexico) Oswaldo Novoa | SD | 4 | 2010-03-19 | Guadalajara, Mexico | |

== See also ==
- Notable boxing families
