= Tyler McCreary =

American boxer

Personal information
- Nickname: Golden Child
- Born: April 9, 1993 (age 33) Toledo, Ohio, U.S.
- Weight: Featherweight

Boxing career
- Stance: Orthodox

Boxing record
- Total fights: 19
- Wins: 16
- Win by KO: 7
- Losses: 2
- Draws: 1

Tyler McCreary (born April 9, 1993 in Toledo, Ohio) is an American boxer in the featherweight division.

== Amateur career ==
McCreary began boxing at the age of 10 and held an amateur record of 87–15 (46 KO's). He won the Title National Championship in 2009 and 2010. McCreary also captured a bronze medal at the Under-19 National Championships, was a two-time Toledo Golden Gloves Champion and won an Ohio State Junior Olympics Championship.

== Professional career ==
McCreary has a professional record of 16–2–1 (7 KO's). He is promoted by Jay Z's Roc Nation Sports and has been called by boxing media "Boxing's next best thing." McCreary is trained by Lamar Wright.

On October 8, 2015 McCreary overcame the toughest test of his career when he won a unanimous decision over Colombian, and former WBA world ranked contender, Manuel de los Reyes Herrera in Rochester, New York.

== Philanthropy ==
McCreary is active in community projects in his hometown of Toledo; including donating his time to a local food bank.
