= Hanzel Martínez =

Mexican boxer (born 1991)

Personal information
- Nickname: Tornadito de Tijuana
- Born: 21 November 1991 (age 34) Tijuana, Baja California, Mexico
- Height: 1.74 m (5 ft 9 in)
- Weight: Bantamweight

Boxing career
- Reach: 175 cm (69 in)
- Stance: Orthodox

Boxing record
- Total fights: 20
- Wins: 19
- Win by KO: 15
- Losses: 1
- Draws: 0
- No contests: 0

Hanzel Martínez (born 21 November 1991) is a Mexican professional boxer and the former WBC USNBC bantamweight Champion.

== Professional career ==
In May 2011, Martínez beat the veteran Omar Gonzalez, this bout was held at the BlueWater Resort & Casino in Parker, Arizona. On 16 February 2013 Martinez was knocked out in the 2nd round of a scheduled 10 round bout with undefeated prospect Alejandro Gonzalez Jr.

== Personal life ==
Martínez is the brother in law of former two-time World Champion, Antonio Margarito.

== See also ==
- Notable boxing families
