= Arsen Martirosian =

Armenian boxer

Personal information
- Nationality: (Armenia) Armenian, (France) French
- Born: Arsen Martirosian; 17 April 1977 (age 49) Armenia
- Weight: Super bantamweight

Boxing career

Boxing record
- Total fights: 23
- Wins: 18
- Win by KO: 8
- Losses: 5
- Draws: 0
- No contests: 0

Arsen Martirosian also transliterated Martirosyan (born 17 April 1977 in Armenia) is an Armenian-French super bantamweight boxer. He is currently based in France.

In his amateur career he had 82 victories with 53 knockouts, and a total of 101 fights, he later moved to France and turned professional in 2004.

Martirosian is the EBU-EE (European External European Union) super bantamweight title holder.
