= England Boxing National Amateur Championships Light-Flyweight Champions =

English Boxing competition

England Boxing National Amateur Championships Light-Flyweight Champions (U50kg)
- Status: active
- Genre: Boxing
- Frequency: annual
- Inaugurated: 1971
- Organiser: England Boxing

The England Boxing National Amateur Championships Light-Flyweight Championship formerly known as the ABA Championships is the primary English amateur boxing championship. It had previously been contested by all the nations of the United Kingdom.

== History ==
The light-flyweight division was inaugurated in 1971 and is currently the weight category of under 50 Kg. The championships are highly regarded in the boxing world and seen as the most prestigious national amateur championships.

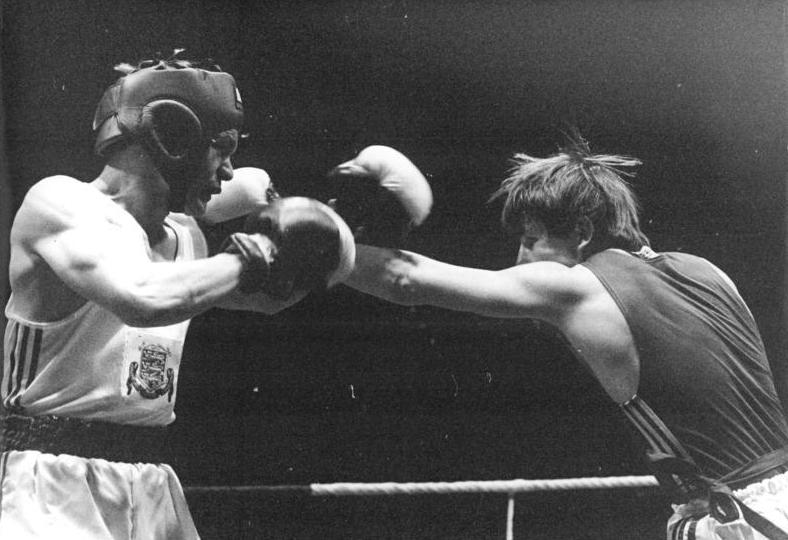
John Lyon (left) was a four times ABA champion from 1981 to 1984

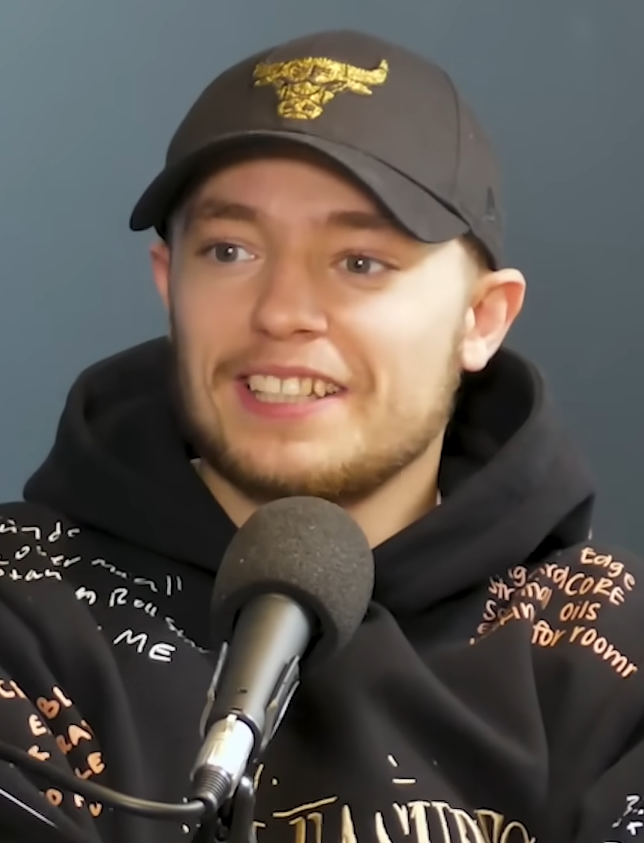
Sunny Edwards 2015 champion

== Past winners ==
| Year | Winner | Club |
|---|---|---|
| 1971 | Micky Abrams | (Battersea ABC) |
| 1972 | Micky Abrams | (Battersea ABC) |
| 1973 | Micky Abrams | (Battersea ABC) |
| 1974 | Charlie Magri | (Arbour Youth ABC) |
| 1975 | Michael Lawless | (Grangemouth ABC) |
| 1976 | Peter Fletcher | (St. Teresas ABC) |
| 1977 | Paul Fletcher | (St. Teresas ABC) |
| 1978 | Joe Dawson | (Boston ABC) |
| 1979 | Joe Dawson | (Boston ABC) |
| 1980 | Terry Barker | (Repton ABC) |
| 1981 | John Lyon | (Lowe House ABC) |
| 1982 | John Lyon | (Lowe House ABC) |
| 1983 | John Lyon | (St. Helens Star ABC) |
| 1984 | John Lyon | (Greenhall St. Helens ABC) |
| 1985 | Mark Epton | (Mexborough Athletic ABC) |
| 1986 | Mark Epton | (Mexborough Athletic ABC) |
| 1987 | Mark Epton | (Mexborough Athletic ABC) |
| 1988 | Mickey Cantwell | (Eltham ABC) |
| 1989 | Mickey Cantwell | (Eltham & District ABC) |
| 1990 | Nick Tooley | (Dawlish ABC) |
| 1991 | Peter Culshaw | (Huyton ABC) |
| 1992 | Darren Fifield | (Henley ABC) |
| 1993 | Mark Hughes | (Gwent Swansea BC) |
| 1994 | Gary Jones | (Sefton ABC) |
| 1995 | Dean Fox | (Royal Air Force) |
| 1996 | Ray Mercer | (St. Helens Town ABC) |
| 1997 | Ian Napa | (Crown and Manor ABC) |
| 1998 | Jamie Evans | (Waterlooville ABC) |
| 1999 | Gary Jones | (Towerhill ABC) |
| 2000 | James Mulhern | (Triumph ABC) |
| 2001 | Craig Lyon | (Wigan ABC) |
| 2002 | Darran Langley | (Hollington ABC) |
| 2003 | Craig Lyon | (Wigan ABC) |
| 2004 | Scott McDonald | (Fitzroy Lodge ABC) |
| 2005 | not held | |
| 2006 | James Fowl | (Hoddesdon ABC) |
| 2007 | Khalid Yafai | (Birmingham Police ABC) |
| 2008 | Tommy Stubbs | (Northside ABC) |
| 2009 | Tommy Stubbs | (Northside ABC) |
| 2010 | Tommy Stubbs | (Northside ABC) |
| 2011 | Charlie Edwards | (Lynn ABC) |
| 2012 | Jack Bateson | (Burmantofts ABC) |
| 2013 | Waleed Din | (Sheffield Lane Top ABC) |
| 2014 | Harvey Horn | (Repton ABC) |
| 2015 | Sunny Edwards | (Steel City) |
| 2016 | Kiaran MacDonald | (Sunderland) |
| 2017 | Kiaran MacDonald | (Sunderland) |
| 2018 | Conner Kelsall | (Tom Hill) |
| 2019 | Conner Kelsall | (Tom Hill) |
| 2020 | cancelled due to COVID 19. | |
| 2021 | Ellis Trowbridge | (Hodbox) |
| 2022 | Ellis Trowbridge | (Hoddesdon) |
| 2023 | Ben Litwin | (Turner's) |
| 2024 | Bilal Siddique | (Karmand) |
| 2025 | Billy Macey | (Rainham) |
| 2026 | Billy Macey | (Legends) |
