= Ashley Sexton =

English boxer

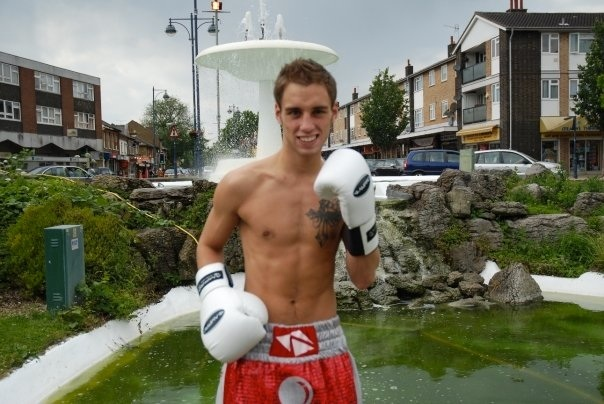
- Sexton in Cheshunt after English Flyweight title win

Personal information
- Nickname: Flash Ash
- Nationality: British
- Born: Ashley Sexton; 21 October 1987 (age 39) Edmonton, North London
- Height: 5 ft 5.5 in (1.66 m)
- Weight: Flyweight (112 lb); Super flyweight (115 lb); Bantamweight (118 lb); Super bantamweight (122 lb); Featherweight (126lb)

Boxing career
- Stance: Orthodox

Boxing record
- Total fights: 20
- Wins: 16
- Win by KO: 5
- Losses: 2
- Draws: 2

Ashley Sexton (born 21 October 1987) is an English professional boxer who was born in Edmonton, North London. He originally came from Wood Green and then moved to Cheshunt and competes in the flyweight division. He is the holder of the English flyweight title and has also competed for the full British title. Sexton is currently trained by Paul Rees and is managed by London promoter Michael Helliet.

== Professional career ==
Sexton made his professional debut in Watford, England on 1 August 2008, defeating David Keogan in a 4 round contest. He fought twice more in that debut year winning on both occasions and compiling a record of 3-0. Sexton fought a further 5 times in 2009 and developed his record with wins over Robert Nelson (in 6 rounds) and Darli Goncalves Pires (first round stoppage). In his first fight of 2010, Sexton fought former British title challenger Usman Ahmed for the English flyweight title; forgoing fancy footwork, Sexton finished the fight on 22 January with a first round knockout and won the English title.

=== British title challenge ===
Following the Ahmed win, Sexton challenged reigning British flyweight champion Shinny Bayaar. Bayaar had won the title from Edwards. The fight on 14 May 2010 was a step up for Sexton as Bayaar was the more experienced boxer with a record of 15-4-1. After losing many of the initial rounds, Sexton began to dominate later on as Shinny Bayaar struggled with a cut injury. The fight, at the Goresbrook Leisure Centre in Dagenham, was scored a draw, although a number of observers felt that Bayaar might have done enough to win. On 2 April 2011 Sexton returned to winning ways with a trip to Germany resulting in a victory against Salim Salimov and then on 30 April 2011 Sexton beat Mike Robinson at the Olympia in London over 8 rounds. Sexton again traveled to Germany on 2 July 2011 to fight Mike Robinson in a rematch, with the fight on the undercard to David Haye's challenge to Wladimir Klitschko for the world heavyweight title. The fight was close and this time the judges scored the contest a draw with Robinson, who said that he would like to fight Sexton again but this time for the English title.

== Professional boxing record ==
15 Wins (5 Knockouts), 2 Defeats, 2 Draws
| Res. | Record | Opponent | Type | Rd., Time | Date | Location | Notes |
| Win | 15-2-2 | (Slovenia) Elemir Rafael | PTS | 4 | 2015-03-14 | (United Kingdom) York Hall, Bethnal Green, London | |
| Loss | 14-2-2 | (Belgium) Stephane Jamoye | TKO | 8 (12) | 2013-03-09 | (Belgium) Herstal, Liege | For EBU bantamweight title. |
| Win | 14-1-2 | (Latvia) Pavels Senkovs | PTS | 4 | 2013-01-24 | (United Kingdom) Millennium Hotel, Mayfair, London | |
| Win | 13-1-2 | (United Kingdom) Marc Callaghan | PTS | 4 | 2012-11-21 | (United Kingdom) Savoy Hotel, The Strand, London | |
| Loss | 12-1-2 | (United Kingdom) Paul Butler | PTS | 10 | 2012-07-05 | (United Kingdom) York Hall, Bethnal Green, London | |
| Win | 12-0-2 | (France) Thomas Masson | PTS | 8 | 2012-03-02 | (United Kingdom) The Troxy, Limehouse, London | |
| Draw | 11-0-2 | (United Kingdom) Mike Robinson | Draw | 8 | 2011-07-02 | (Germany) Imtech Arena, Altona, Hamburg | |
| Win | 11-0-1 | (United Kingdom) Mike Robinson | PTS | 8 | 2011-04-30 | (United Kingdom) Olympia, Kensington, London | |
| Win | 10-0-1 | (Bulgaria) Salim Salimov | UD | 6 | 2010-04-02 | (Germany) Gerry Weber Stadium, Halle, Nordrhein-Westfalen | |
| Draw | 9-0-1 | (United Kingdom) Shinny Bayaar | Draw | 12 | 2010-05-14 | (United Kingdom) Goresbrook Leisure Centre, Dagenham, Essex | For British flyweight title. |
| Win | 9-0 | (United Kingdom) Usman Ahmed | KO | 1 (10) | 2010-01-22 | (United Kingdom) Brentwood Centre, Brentwood, Essex | Won vacant English flyweight title. |
| Win | 8-0 | (Brazil) Darli Goncalves Pires | TKO | 1 (10), 2:34 | 2009-09-11 | (United Kingdom) Brentwood Centre, Brentwood, Essex | |
| Win | 7-0 | (Serbia) Kemal Plavci | PTS | 6 | 2009-06-30 | (United Kingdom) York Hall, Bethnal Green, London | |
| Win | 6-0 | (United Kingdom) Delroy Spencer | PTS | 6 | 2009-05-29 | (United Kingdom) Fenton Manor Sports Complex, Stoke, Staffordshire | |
| Win | 5-0 | (United Kingdom) Robert Nelson | TKO | 6 (8), 2:14 | 2009-03-20 | (United Kingdom) Leisure Centre, Newham, London | |
| Win | 4-0 | (Bulgaria) Fikret Remziev | TKO | 2 (8), 2:34 | 2009-01-23 | (United Kingdom) Fenton Manor Sports Complex, Stoke, Staffordshire | |
| Win | 3-0 | (Georgia (country)) levan Garibashvili | TKO | 3 (4), 1:06 | 2008-12-06 | (United Kingdom) York Hall, Bethnal Green, London | |
| Win | 2-0 | (United Kingdom) Delroy Spencer | PTS | 4 | 2008-10-17 | (United Kingdom) York Hall, Bethnal Green, London | |
| Win | 1-0 | (United Kingdom) David Keogan | PTS | 4 | 2008-08-01 | (United Kingdom) Watford Town Hall, Watford, Hertfordshire | Professional boxing debut. |
