= Iván Morales =

Iván Morales may refer to:

- Iván Morales (boxer)
- Iván Morales (footballer)
- Ivan Morales Jr., Brazilian film editor and film maker
