= Tomoki Kameda =

Japanese boxer (born 1991)

- 亀田和毅
- Born: July 12, 1991 (age 35); Osaka, Japan
- Relatives: Kōki Kameda (brother); Daiki Kameda (brother)
- Boxing career
- Nicknames: El Mexicanito (The Little Mexican); Kameda-ke Saishū Heiki (The Ultimate Weapon of the Kamedas)
- Height: 5 ft 7 1/2 in (171 cm)
- Weight: Bantamweight; Super bantamweight; Featherweight
- Reach: 67 in (170 cm)
- Stance: Orthodox

Boxing record
- Total fights: 47
- Wins: 42
- Win by KO: 23
- Losses: 5

Japanese name
- Kanji: 亀田和毅
- Hiragana: かめだ ともき
- Katakana: カメダ トモキ
Transcriptions
- Romanization: Kameda Tomoki

Tomoki Kameda (born July 12, 1991) is a Japanese professional boxer. He is a former World Boxing Organization (WBO) bantamweight champion, having held the title from 2013 to 2014.

== Early life ==
Kameda was born in the Nishinari-ku ward of Osaka. He is the younger brother of Kōki Kameda and Daiki Kameda. Their father, boxing trainer Shiro Kameda, dreamt that all three sons would grow up to win world titles in the sport.

At the age of 15, Kameda relocated to Mexico in order to learn from Mexican boxing experts.

== Amateur career ==
Kameda had been training for the Beijing Olympics and ran his record to 35-1-1 in Japan. After his move to Mexico, he competed in the Guantes de Oro de México (the Mexican equivalent to the Golden Gloves). However, he was too young to participate at the Olympic qualifiers. Instead of waiting, Kameda chose to turn pro.

== Professional career ==
=== WBO bantamweight champion ===
Kameda made his professional debut against Alejandro Moreno on November 21, 2008, and won the fight by a second-round knockout. He amassed an 27–0 record during the next year, before challenging for the WBO bantamweight title. On May 30, 2013, it was announced that Kameda would challenge the undefeated reigning WBO bantamweight champion Paulus Ambunda. The bantamweight title bout was scheduled as the main event of an August 1, 2013 card that took place at the Waterfront Cebu City Hotel & Casino in Cebu City, Philippines. Despite coming into the fight as an underdog, Kameda won the fight by unanimous decision, with scores of 118–110, 116–112 and 117–111. Kameda made history as the first Japanese boxer to win a WBO title.

Kameda faced another Namibian in his first title defense, as he was booked to face the undefeated Immanuel Naidjala. The bout was scheduled for the undercard of the Liborio Solis and Daiki Kameda unified super flyweight title fight, which took place on December 3, 2013, at the Bodymaker Colosseum in Osaka, Osaka. Kameda retained the belt by unanimous decision, with scores of 117–111, 118–110 and 119–109. Kameda was booked to make his second title defense against the former two-time WBO bantamweight titleholder Pungluang Sor Singyu. The fight was scheduled for the undercard of the Canelo Alvarez and Erislandy Lara middleweight bout, which took place on July 12, 2014, at the MGM Grand Las Vegas in Paradise, Nevada. This bout represented Kameda's United States and Showtime debut. Kameda won the fight by a seventh-round technical knockout. He sent Singyu to the canvas with a left hook to the liver, which left the former champion unable to beat the ten-count. The scores at the time of the stoppage were 58–56 for Kameda, 58–56 for Singyu and 57–57. Kameda made his third and final WBO bantamweight title defense against Alejandro Hernández on November 1, 2014, at the Credit Union 1 Arena in Chicago, Illinois. The bout was organized by Hernández's promoters Warriors Boxing, who won the purse bid with an offer of $603 000. Kameda was entitled to an 80% split of the purse, i.e. $482 400, while Hernández earned $120 600. Kameda won the fight by split decision. Two judges awarded him a 115–113 scorecard, while the third judge gave the same scorecard to Hernández.

After beating Hernández, Kameda requested to face the WBA (Regular) bantamweight champion Jamie McDonnell in a title unification bout. This request was rejected by the WBO, as McDonnell was only the WBA "regular" champion, which was considered a secondary title by the organization. Kameda reacted to this by vacating the title on April 23, 2015, stating: "I have decided to relinquish my WBO belt. My main focus is to fight the best fighters in the world regardless of titles. Mcdonnell is a top fighter at 118 pounds and it was my wish to face him. I respect the WBO's decision to not sanction the fight and thank them for the opportunity to be their world champion". Kameda was booked to challenge McDonnell on May 1, 2015. Although he entered the bout as the favorite, Kameda lost the fight by a close unanimous decision. All three judges scored the fight 114–113 for McDonnell. The pair was scheduled to fight an immediate rematch on September 6, 2015. McDonnel once again won the fight by unanimous decision, this time in a more convincing fashion, with scores of 115–112, 116–111 and 117–110.

=== Super bantamweight ===
After suffering the first two losses of his professional career, Kameda moved up in weight to super bantamweight, and was booked to face Edgar Martinez on October 15, 2016. He won the fight by a first-round knockout. Kameda next faced Mike Rawatchai on March 10, 2017, in his first fight in Japan since December 2013. He won the fight by unanimous decision, with scores of 100–88, 100–90 and 99–90. Four months later, on July 10, 2017, Kameda faced the one-time IBF bantamweight title challenger Iván Morales. He won the fight by unanimous decision, with scores of 100–90, 100–90 and 99–91. Kameda was booked to face Daniel Noriega on May 5, 2018. He won the fight by unanimous decision, with all three judges scoring the fight 100–88 in his favor.

Kameda was booked to challenge the reigning WBC interim super bantamweight titleholder Abigail Medina on November 12, 2018. The title bout was scheduled as the main event of an Abema TV broadcast card that took place at the Korakuen Hall in Tokyo, Japan. Abema TV broadcast the fight live and exclusively on the internet, which was the first time that a world boxing championship in Japan was broadcast in such a way. Kameda won the fight by unanimous decision. Two of the judges scored the fight 117–111 in his favor, while the third judge awarded him a 116–112 scorecard. The fight peaked at 2.2 million viewers.

Winning the interim title placed Kameda at the front of the line to challenge the reigning champion Rey Vargas. The fight was officially confirmed on June 6, 2019, to take place at the Dignity Health Sports Park in Carson, California on July 13, 2019. The bout was broadcast by DAZN. Vargas justified his role as the betting favorite, as he won the fight by unanimous decision. All three judges scored the fight 117–110 for Vargas. Kameda was out-landed 173 to 133 in total punches, but only 122 to 120 in power punches.

Kameda returned to boxing following a 22-month absence from the sport to face Hironori Miyake. The bout was booked for May 22, 2021, and took place at the 176BOX in Toyonaka, Japan. He won the fight by unanimous decision, with scores of 79–73, 78–73, and 78–73. After successfully bouncing back from his third professional loss, Kameda was scheduled to face Yonfrez Parejo in a WBA super bantamweight title eliminator. He earned the status of mandatory challenger by beating Parejo by unanimous decision, with scores of 118–110, 117–111 and 116–112.

On April 22, 2022, Kameda announced he had begun to train at the TRYBOX Heisei Nishiyama. Kameda was booked to face William Encarnación on July 30, 2022, at the Kobe Municipal Central Gymnasium in Kobe, Japan. Kameda won the fight by a fourth-round knockout.

Kameda was booked to face the #12 ranked WBA super bantamweight contender Luis Castillo in a stay-busy fight on February 25, 2023, at the ATC Hall in Osaka, Japan. He won the fight by a fifth-round knockout.

Kameda was ordered by the WBA, on June 5, 2023, to face former unified super-bantamweight champion Murodjon Akhmadaliev in a super bantamweight title eliminator.

Kameda fought Angelo Leo for the IBF Featherweight Championship on May 24, 2025 in Osaka. He lost by decision.

== Personal life ==
Kameda is fluent in Spanish. He married his wife, a Mexican woman, in October 2015. They have two sons.

=== Nickname ===
His early nickname in Japan was Kameda-ke Saishū Heiki (亀田家最終兵器). It denotes "The Ultimate Weapon of the Kamedas". He later gained a Spanish nickname El Mexicanito which translates to "The Little Mexican", since he also trains and fights out of Mexico. He has started to earn the respect of Mexican boxing fans, due to his very aggressive style of fighting.

== Professional boxing record ==
47 fights	42 wins	5 losses
By knockout	23	0
By decision	19	5

No.	Result	Record	Opponent	Type	Round, time	Date	Location	Notes
47	Loss	42–5	Angelo Leo	MD	12	May 24, 2025	Intex Osaka, Osaka, Japan	For IBF featherweight title
46	Win	42–4	Lerato Dlamini	SD	12	Aug 24, 2024	Yamato Arena, Suita, Japan	
45	Win	41–4	Kevin Villanueva	RTD	5 (10), 3:00	Mar 31, 2024	International Conference Hall, Nagoya, Japan	
44	Loss	40–4	Lerato Dlamini	SD	12	Oct 7, 2023	Ota City General Gymnasium, Tokyo, Japan	
43	Win	40–3	Luis Castillo	TKO	5 (10), 1:18	Feb 25, 2023	ATC Hall, Osaka, Japan	
42	Win	39–3	William Encarnación	KO	4 (10), 2:35	Jul 30, 2022	Kobe Municipal Central Gymnasium, Kobe, Japan	
41	Win	38–3	Yonfrez Parejo	UD	12	Dec 11, 2021	Centro de Usos Múltiples, Hermosillo, Mexico	
40	Win	37–3	Hironori Miyake	UD	8	May 22, 2021	176BOX, Toyonaka, Osaka, Japan	
39	Loss	36–3	Rey Vargas	UD	12	Jul 13, 2019	Dignity Health Sports Park, Carson, California, U.S.	For WBC super bantamweight title
38	Win	36–2	Abigail Medina	UD	12	Nov 12, 2018	Korakuen Hall, Tokyo, Japan	Won WBC interim super bantamweight title
37	Win	35–2	Daniel Noriega	UD	10	May 5, 2018	Korakuen Hall, Tokyo, Japan	
36	Win	34–2	Iván Morales	UD	10	Jul 10, 2017	Korakuen Hall, Tokyo, Japan	
35	Win	33–2	Mike Rawatchai	UD	10	Mar 10, 2017	Korakuen Hall, Tokyo, Japan	
34	Win	32–2	Edgar Martinez	KO	1 (10), 1:17	Oct 15, 2016	Gimnasio G2, Iztapalapa, Mexico City, Mexico	
33	Loss	31–2	Jamie McDonnell	UD	12	Sep 6, 2015	American Bank Center, Corpus Christi, Texas, U.S.	For WBA (Regular) bantamweight title
32	Loss	31–1	Jamie McDonnell	UD	12	May 9, 2015	State Farm Arena, Hidalgo, Texas, U.S.	For WBA (Regular) bantamweight title
31	Win	31–0	Alejandro Hernández	SD	12	Nov 1, 2014	Credit Union 1 Arena, Chicago, Illinois, U.S.	Retained WBO bantamweight title
30	Win	30–0	Pungluang Sor Singyu	TKO	7 (12), 1:35	Jul 12, 2014	MGM Grand Garden Arena, Paradise, Nevada, U.S.	Retained WBO bantamweight title
29	Win	29–0	Immanuel Naidjala	UD	12	Dec 3, 2013	Prefectural Gymnasium, Osaka, Japan	Retained WBO bantamweight title
28	Win	28–0	Paulus Ambunda	UD	12	Aug 1, 2013	Waterfront Cebu City Hotel, Cebu City, Philippines	Won WBO bantamweight title
27	Win	27–0	Nouldy Manakane	KO	6 (10), 0:36	Mar 9, 2013	Bunka Gym, Yokohama, Kanagawa, Japan	
26	Win	26–0	Rey Las Pinas	KO	4 (10), 1:23	Dec 4, 2012	Prefectural Gymnasium, Osaka, Japan	
25	Win	25–0	Javier Franco	TKO	5 (10), 1:18	Oct 27, 2012	international Convention Center, Chetumal, Mexico	
24	Win	24–0	Monico Laurente	UD	10	Aug 19, 2012	Sun Messe Kagawa, Takamatsu, Kagawa, Japan	
23	Win	23–0	Jairo Hernandez	RTD	10 (12), 3:00	Apr 26, 2012	Centro Bancomer, Mexico City, Distrito Federal, Mexico	Won vacant WBC Silver bantamweight title
22	Win	22–0	Eduardo García	KO	7 (10), 1:23	Dec 7, 2011	Prefectural Gymnasium, Osaka, Japan	
21	Win	21–0	Jesús Ceja	TKO	7 (10), 1:06	Oct 15, 2011	Centro Internacional, Chetumal, Quintana Roo, Mexico	
20	Win	20–0	Dandy Toei	UD	10	Jul 8, 2011	Kyuden Gym, Fukuoka, Fukuoka, Japan	Retained WBC Youth World bantamweight title
19	Win	19–0	Nathan Bolcio	UD	10	May 7, 2011	Prefectural Gymnasium, Osaka, Japan	
18	Win	18–0	Germán Meraz	UD	12	Feb 19, 2011	Discothèque Collage, Puerto Vallarta, Jalisco, Mexico	Won NABF bantamweight title
17	Win	17–0	Pichitchai Twins Gym	KO	3 (10), 2:12	Dec 26, 2010	Super Arena, Saitama, Japan	Retained WBC Youth World bantamweight title
16	Win	16–0	Stephane Jamoye	SD	10	Aug 28, 2010	Lobo Dome, Mazatlán, Sinaloa, Mexico	Won WBC Youth World bantamweight title
15	Win	15–0	Arturo Camargo	UD	10	Jul 10, 2010	Arena VFG, Guadalajara, Jalisco, Mexico	Won WBC Youth Intercontinental super bantamweight title
14	Win	14–0	Javier Rodríguez	UD	10	May 29, 2010	Arena Tecate, Guadalajara, Jalisco, Mexico	
13	Win	13–0	Narciso Lara	TKO	3 (10), 1:36	Apr 30, 2010	Gimnasio German Evers, Mazatlán, Sinaloa, Mexico	Retained WBC FECARBOX bantamweight title
12	Win	12–0	Rodolfo Garay	KO	3 (10), 1:53	Jan 16, 2010	Auditorio Centenario, Gómez Palacio, Durango, Mexico	Won WBC FECARBOX bantamweight title
11	Win	11–0	Marlon Márquez	UD	10	Nov 27, 2009	Edogawa Sports Center, Tokyo, Japan	
10	Win	10–0	Jesus Periban	TKO	3 (8), 2:00	Sep 5, 2009	Differ Ariake, Tokyo, Japan	
9	Win	9–0	Marco Antonio Chable	TKO	4 (6), 0:46	Aug 6, 2009	Woda Night Club, Lomas de Sotelo, Mexico	
8	Win	8–0	Alejandro Dotor	TKO	3 (6), 2:08	Jun 26, 2009	Salon Marbet Plus, Ciudad Nezahualcóyotl, Mexico	
7	Win	7–0	Tatsuhiro Kumobayashi	TKO	4 (6), 0:42	May 30, 2009	Edogawa Sports Center, Tokyo, Japan	
6	Win	6–0	Alain Lopez	UD	4	Apr 11, 2009	Gimnasio Niños Héroes, Tepic, Nayarit, Mexico	
5	Win	5–0	Andres Torres	TKO	2 (4), 1:38	Mar 14, 2009	Auditorio Centenario, Torreón, Mexico	
4	Win	4–0	Arturo Delgado	TKO	2 (4), 2:14	Feb 6, 2009	Salon Marbet Plus, Ciudad Nezahualcóyotl, Mexico	
3	Win	3–0	Juan Carlos Olvera	TKO	3 (4), 0:36	Jan 24, 2009	Arena San Juan, Ciudad Nezahualcóyotl, Mexico	
2	Win	2–0	Adrian Ramirez	KO	2 (4), 1:33	Dec 8, 2008	South Gym, Oyama, Tochigi, Japan	
1	Win	1–0	Alejandro Moreno	KO	2 (4), 2:08	Nov 21, 2008	Salon Marbet Plus, Ciudad Nezahualcóyotl, Mexico	

== See also ==
- Notable boxing families
- Boxing in Japan
- List of Japanese boxing world champions
- List of world bantamweight boxing champions

Sporting positions
Regional boxing titles
Vacant Title last held by Flavio Hernandez	WBC FECARBOX bantamweight champion January 16, 2010 – 2010; Vacated	Vacant Title next held by David de la Mora
Vacant Title last held by Jesús Galicia	WBC Youth Intercontinental super-bantamweight champion July 10, 2010 – 2010; Vacated	Vacant Title next held by Randy Caballero
Preceded by Stephane Jamoye	WBC Youth bantamweight champion August 28, 2010 – 2011; Vacated	Vacant Title next held by Masamichi Nozaki
Vacant Title last held by Cristian Mijares	NABF bantamweight champion February 19, 2011 – 2011; Vacated	Vacant Title next held by Christian Esquivel
Vacant Title last held by Abner Mares	WBC Silver bantamweight champion April 26, 2012 – 2013; Vacated	Vacant Title next held by Julio Ceja
World boxing titles
Preceded by Paulus Ambunda	WBO bantamweight champion August 1, 2013 – April 23, 2015; Vacated	Vacant Title next held by Pungluang Sor Singyu
Vacant Title last held by Julio Ceja	WBC super bantamweight champion Interim title November 12, 2018 – July 13, 2019; Lost bid for full title	Vacant
