= John Lyon (boxer) =

English boxer

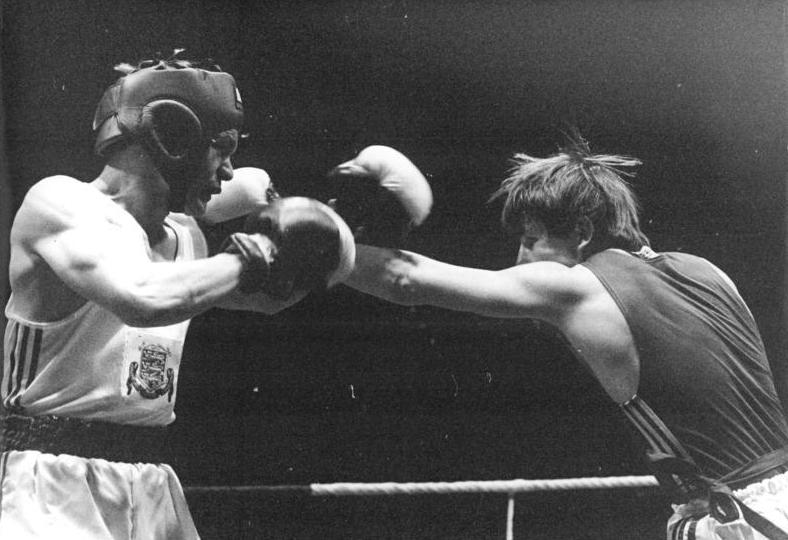
- Lyon (left) versus René Breitbarth of East Germany in Rostock, 1985

Personal information
- Born: 9 March 1962 (age 64)
Medal record
Men's boxing
Representing England
Commonwealth Games
Gold medal – first place	1986 Edinburgh	Flyweight
Silver medal – second place	1982 Brisbane	Flyweight

John Patrick Lyon MBE (born 9 March 1962) is a retired boxer from Great Britain.

== Boxing career ==
A member of the Greenall St. Helens Amateur Boxing Club he competed at the 1984 Summer Olympics and 1988 Summer Olympics. He represented England and won a silver medal in the light flyweight division, at the 1982 Commonwealth Games in Brisbane, Queensland, Australia. Four years later he represented England again and won a gold medal in the men's flyweight division (– 48 kg), at the 1986 Commonwealth Games in Edinburgh, Scotland. He appeared at a third consecutive games in 1990.

Lyon won eight English ABA titles, four flyweight and four light-flyweight and a bronze medal in the 1991 Acropolis Cup, retiring immediately afterwards.

He was awarded an MBE for services to amateur boxing.

== 1988 Olympic results ==
Below is the record of John Lyon, a British flyweight boxer who competed at the 1988 Seoul Olympics:

- Round of 64: lost to Ramazan Gul (Turkey) by decision, 1-4

== Personal life ==
Lyon's son Craig Lyon also won the English light-flyweight title, twice. He also competed in the Prizefighter tournament at super-flyweight in 2011, but was defeated by Ryan Farrag in the quarter finals.
