= Stephane Jamoye =

Belgian boxer

Personal information
- Nickname: Survivor
- Nationality: Belgian
- Born: 5 October 1989 (age 36) Visé, Belgium
- Height: 5 ft 6 in (1.68 m)
- Weight: Super flyweight; Bantamweight; Super bantamweight

Boxing career
- Reach: 67.5 in (171 cm)
- Stance: Orthodox

Boxing record
- Total fights: 43
- Wins: 33
- Win by KO: 18
- Losses: 9
- Draws: 1
- No contests: 0

Stephane Jamoye (born 5 October 1989) is a Belgian professional boxer who held the European bantamweight title from 2012 to 2013. He also challenged for the WBC bantamweight title and WBA (Regular) super bantamweight title in 2014.

== Amateur career ==
Jamoye started boxing at the age of 14, and was a national champion by 16. Overall, Jamoye compiled a 56–4 record in the amateur ranks.

== Professional career ==
Jamoye turned pro 20 days after his 18th birthday. After an impressive 12–0 start to his career, he received a shot at the WBC Youth World bantamweight title. He defeated fellow undefeated fighter Pungluang Sor Singyu on 9 May 2009 by split decision for the belt.

After five straight wins, Jamoye lost the title to another 19-year-old, Tomoki Kameda, via a controversial split decision on 28 August 2010 in Mazatlán. The fight was initially declared a draw, but the victory was then awarded to Kameda after a judge found an error on his scorecard. The WBC ordered a rematch to resolve the issue, but Kameda refused. It was also his first fight outside of Europe.

Jamoye fought Jamie McDonnell on 22 January 2011 in Doncaster, England for his EBU bantamweight belt, but lost the entertaining fight by majority decision. After a win by TKO over Tanzanian boxer Anthony Mathias, Jamoye fought American Léo Santa Cruz in Xalapa, Mexico on 26 March 2011. The fast-paced battle ended in the sixth round, when Santa Cruz hit Jamoye with a right hook to the body. The fight was also for the interim WBC Youth World bantamweight title.

Three consecutive wins later, he faced Lee Haskins on 14 December 2012 for the EBU bantamweight title. Jamoye was knocked down in the second round, but responded by opening a cut above Haskins' right eye in the third. Cheered on by his hometown crowd, he sent Haskins to the canvas with an array of punches in the sixth. Haskins then went down three times in the eighth, each the result of a brutal body shot. The referee finally stopped the bout in the Belgian fighter's favor after the third time. The commentators called it a "late candidate for fight of the year."

Jamoye retained against Ashley Sexton three months later in Herstal with another eighth-round TKO. Now ranked as the #1 bantamweight by the WBC, Jamoye was shocked by Frenchman Karim Guerfi by majority decision on 28 September 2013 for the title. Guerfi had lost three of his previous four fights.

His next fight was against Shinsuke Yamanaka for his WBC World bantamweight title. Jamoye went down four times before the bout was stopped in the ninth round. After a first-round TKO against Hungarian journeyman Richard Voros, Jamoye faced Scott Quigg in Manchester on 13 September 2014 for his WBA World super bantamweight title. Quigg's original opponent, Paulus Ambunda, pulled out with a hamstring injury. During the fight, Quigg hit Jamoye with a devastating body blow in the third round to end the lopsided bout and retain his title.

== Professional boxing record ==
33 Wins (18 knockouts, 15 decisions), 9 Losses, 1 Draw
Res.	Record	Opponent	Type	Rd., Time	Date	Location	Notes
Loss	33–9–1	(Italy) Emiliano Marsili	UD	10	2021-06-25	(Italy) Civitavecchia	For vacant IBO Mediterranean lightweight title
Draw	33–8–1	(France) Sebastian Iacobas	UD	6	2021-04-03	(Belgium) Salle Omnisports, Visé	
Win	33–8	(Latvia) Janis Puksins	KO	2 (6), 2:05	2019-11-23	(Belgium) Hall Omnisport de La Préalle, Herstal	
Loss	32–8	(France) Karim Guerfi	TKO	8 (12)	2017-10-12	Sud de France Arena, Pérols	For European bantamweight title
Win	32–7	(Hungary) Zsolt Sarkozi	KO	1 (6)	2017-05-20	(Belgium) Verviers	
Win	31–7	(Nicaragua) Lesther Cantillano	UD	8	2017-01-28	(Belgium) Hall Omnisport de La Préalle, Herstal	
Win	30–7	(Nicaragua) Edwin Tellez	UD	6	2016-06-11	(Belgium) Hall Omnisport, Esneux	
Win	29–7	(Nicaragua) Edwin Tellez	UD	6	2016-05-28	(Belgium) Herstal	
Loss	28–7	(United Kingdom) Ryan Farrag	KO	9 (12)	2015-10-30	(Belgium) Hall Omnisport de La Préalle, Herstal	For vacant European bantamweight title
Win	28–6	(Nicaragua) Reynaldo Cajina	UD	8	2015-01-31	(Belgium) Hall omnisport, Montegnee	
Win	27–6	(Honduras) Jorge Luis Munguia	UD	8	2014-11-08	(Belgium) Hall Omnisport de La Préalle, Herstal	
Loss	26–6	(United Kingdom) Scott Quigg	TKO	3 (12), 1:13	2014-09-13	(United Kingdom) Manchester Arena, Manchester	For WBA (Regular) super bantamweight title
Win	26–5	(Hungary) Richard Voros	TKO	1 (6), 1:15	2014-06-07	(Belgium) Esneux	
Loss	25–5	(Japan) Shinsuke Yamanaka	TKO	9 (12), 0:11	2014-04-23	(Japan) Osaka-jō Hall, Osaka	For WBC bantamweight title
Loss	25–4	(France) Karim Guerfi	MD	12	2013-09-28	(Belgium) Herstal	Lost European bantamweight title
Win	25–3	(United Kingdom) Ashley Sexton	TKO	8 (12)	2013-03-09	(Belgium) Herstal	Retained European bantamweight title
Win	24–3	(United Kingdom) Lee Haskins	TKO	8 (12)	2012-12-14	(Belgium) Hallo Omnisport La Préalle, Herstal	Won European bantamweight title
Win	23-3	(Nicaragua) Miguel Aguilar	RTD	2 (10), 1:55	2012-02-18	(Belgium) Hallo Omnisport La Préalle, Herstal	Won vacant WBC Youth Intercontinental super flyweight title
Win	22–3	(Nicaragua) Julio Buitrago	KO	4 (8)	2011-11-12	(Belgium) Bulle de Gerardchamps, Verviers	
Win	21–3	(Ecuador) Luis Singo	KO	4 (8)	2011-06-17	(Belgium) Salle Omisports, Visé	
Loss	20–3	(Mexico) Léo Santa Cruz	KO	6 (10)	2011-03-26	(Mexico) El Nido de los Halcones-Instituto de la Joventud, Xalapa	For WBC Youth interim bantamweight title
Win	20–2	(Tanzania) Anthony Mathias	TKO	8 (8)	2011-02-19	(Belgium) Herstal	
Loss	19–2	(United Kingdom) Jamie McDonnell	MD	12	2011-01-22	(United Kingdom) Doncaster Dome, Doncaster	For European bantamweight title
Win	19–1	(Colombia) Giovanni Jaramillo	TKO	11 (12)	2010-11-05	(Spain) Pabellon Municipal Deheya Boyal, San Sebastián de los Reyes	Retained European Union bantamweight title
Loss	18–1	(Japan) Tomoki Kameda	SD	10	2010-08-28	(Mexico) Lobo Dome, Mazatlán	Lost WBC Youth bantamweight title
Win	18–0	(Slovakia) Peter Baláž	KO	1 (6), 0:29	2010-05-14	(Belgium) Visé	
Win	17–0	(France) Franck Gorjux	TKO	8 (12)	2010-04-10	(Belgium) Loncin	Retained European Union bantamweight title
Win	16–0	(Tanzania) Hamis Ajali	KO	7 (10)	2010-02-20	(Belgium) Salle de la préhalle, Herstal	Retained WBC Youth bantamweight title
Win	15–0	(France) Mohamed Bouleghcha	UD	12	2009-11-28	(Belgium) Salle Omnisport, Oupeye	Won European Union bantamweight title
Win	14–0	(Belgium) Cedric Cambier	UD	4	2009-10-10	(Belgium) Salle Omnisport, Chératte	
Win	13–0	(Thailand) Pungluang Sor Singyu	SD	10	2009-05-09	(Belgium) Halle Omnisport, Loncin	Won WBC Youth bantamweight title
Win	12–0	(France) Mohamed Nouari	RTD	5 (6)	2009-03-13	(France) Salle Gerland, Lyon	
Win	11–0	(Israel) Eilon Kedem	UD	10	2009-02-21	(Belgium) Hall omnisport de Herstal, Herstal	Won vacant Belgian bantamweight title
Win	10–0	(France) Aurelien Lecoq	RTD	6 (8)	2008-12-02	(Belgium) Verviers	
Win	9–0	(Slovakia) Ladislav Nemeth	KO	1 (6)	2008-11-22	(Belgium) Visé	
Win	8–0	(Slovakia) Ladislav Nemeth	PTS	6	2008-09-27	(Belgium) Colfontaine	
Win	7–0	(Slovakia) Robert Csicso	TKO	1 (6)	2008-05-30	(Belgium) Visé	
Win	6–0	(Poland) Andrzej Ziora	UD	6	2008-04-19	(Belgium) Verviers	
Win	5–0	(France) Aurelien Lecoq	UD	4	2008-04-12	(Belgium) Loncin	
Win	4–0	(Slovakia) Elemir Rafael	UD	4	2008-02-23	(Belgium) Herstal	
Win	3–0	(France) Aurelien Lecoq	UD	4	2007-12-22	(Belgium) Amay	
Win	2–0	(Romania) Cristian Niculae	PTS	4	2007-11-17	(Belgium) Verviers	
Win	1–0	(Slovakia) Robert Zsemberi	KO	2 (4)	2007-10-27	(Belgium) Chératte	

== Personal life ==
Jamoye's younger brother, Steve, is also a professional boxer out of Belgium. As of October 2015, his record is 17-1-1. He is a former WBC Youth Silver and Belgium super lightweight champion.

Sporting positions
Preceded by Lee Haskins	EBU Bantamweight Champion; 14 December 2012 – 28 September 2013	Succeeded by Karim Guerfi
