= Kevin Satchell =

English boxer

Personal information
- Nickname: Ice Man / Satch
- Nationality: English
- Born: Kevin Satchell; 22 November 1988 (age 37) Liverpool, England
- Height: 5 ft 6 1/2 in (169 cm)
- Weight: Flyweight; Super flyweight; Bantamweight; Super bantamweight

Boxing career
- Stance: Orthodox

Boxing record
- Total fights: 16
- Wins: 16
- Win by KO: 3
- Losses: 0
- Draws: 0

Kevin "Satch" Satchell (born 22 September 1988) is a British former professional boxer who competed from 2010 to 2016. He held the British, Commonwealth and European Boxing Union European flyweight titles between 2012 and 2014. Satchell announced his retirement from boxing in January 2018.

== Amateur boxing career ==
Satchell represented Everton Red Triangle ABC as an amateur.

== Professional boxing record ==
| 16 fights | 16 wins | 0 losses |
|---|---|---|
| By knockout | 3 | 0 |
| By decision | 13 | 0 |

| No. | Result | Record | Opponent | Type | Round, time | Date | Location | Notes |
|---|---|---|---|---|---|---|---|---|
| 16 | Win | 16–0 | (United Kingdom) Brett Fidoe | PTS | 6 | 4 Jun 2016 | (United Kingdom) Echo Arena, Liverpool, England | |
| 15 | Win | 15–0 | (Argentina) Adrian Dimas Garzon | PTS | 8 | 12 Mar 2016 | (United Kingdom) Echo Arena, Liverpool, England | |
| 14 | Win | 14–0 | (Argentina) Walter Rojas | TKO | 1 (10), 2:54 | 6 Mar 2015 | (United Kingdom) Echo Arena, Liverpool, England | |
| 13 | Win | 13–0 | (Belarus) Valery Yanchy | MD | 12 | 25 Oct 2014 | (United Kingdom) Echo Arena, Liverpool, England | Won EBU European flyweight title |
| 12 | Win | 12–0 | (Ghana) Isaac Quaye | UD | 12 | 8 Mar 2014 | (United Kingdom) Aintree Equestrian Centre, Liverpool, England | Retained Commonwealth flyweight title |
| 11 | Win | 11–0 | (United Kingdom) Iain Butcher | UD | 12 | 6 Jul 2013 | (United Kingdom) Echo Arena, Liverpool, England | Retained British and Commonwealth flyweight titles |
| 10 | Win | 10–0 | (United Kingdom) Luke Wilton | UD | 12 | 23 Feb 2013 | (United Kingdom) Echo Arena, Liverpool, Merseyside | Retained British and Commonwealth flyweight titles |
| 9 | Win | 9–0 | (United Kingdom) Chris Edwards | TKO | 6 (12), 2:17 | 13 Oct 2013 | (United Kingdom) Echo Arena, Liverpool, England | Won British flyweight title; Retained Commonwealth flyweight title |
| 8 | Win | 8–0 | (United Kingdom) Paul Edwards | RTD | 10 (12), 1:46 | 19 Dec 2012 | (United Kingdom) Aintree Equestrian Centre, Liverpool, England | Won Commonwealth flyweight title |
| 7 | Win | 7–0 | (United Kingdom) Martin Power | PTS | 6 | 21 Jan 2012 | (United Kingdom) Olympia, Liverpool, England | |
| 6 | Win | 6–0 | (United Kingdom) Les Dennis | PTS | 4 | 30 Jul 2011 | (United Kingdom) Greenbank Sports Centre, Liverpool, England | |
| 5 | Win | 5–0 | (Bulgaria) Salim Salimov | PTS | 4 | 27 Apr 2011 | (United Kingdom) Olympia, Liverpool, England | |
| 4 | Win | 4–0 | (United Kingdom) Anwar Alfadli | PTS | 4 | 19 Mar 2011 | (United Kingdom) Robin Park Centre, Wigan, England | |
| 3 | Win | 3–0 | (United Kingdom) Francis Croes | PTS | 6 | 22 Jan 2011 | (United Kingdom) Olympia, Liverpool, England | |
| 2 | Win | 2–0 | (United Kingdom) Francis Croes | PTS | 6 | 27 Nov 2010 | (United Kingdom) Olympia, Liverpool, England | |
| 1 | Win | 1–0 | (United Kingdom) Delroy Spencer | PTS | 6 | 22 Oct 2010 | (United Kingdom) Robin Park Centre, Wigan, England | |
