= Karim Guerfi =

French-Algerian boxer (born 1987)

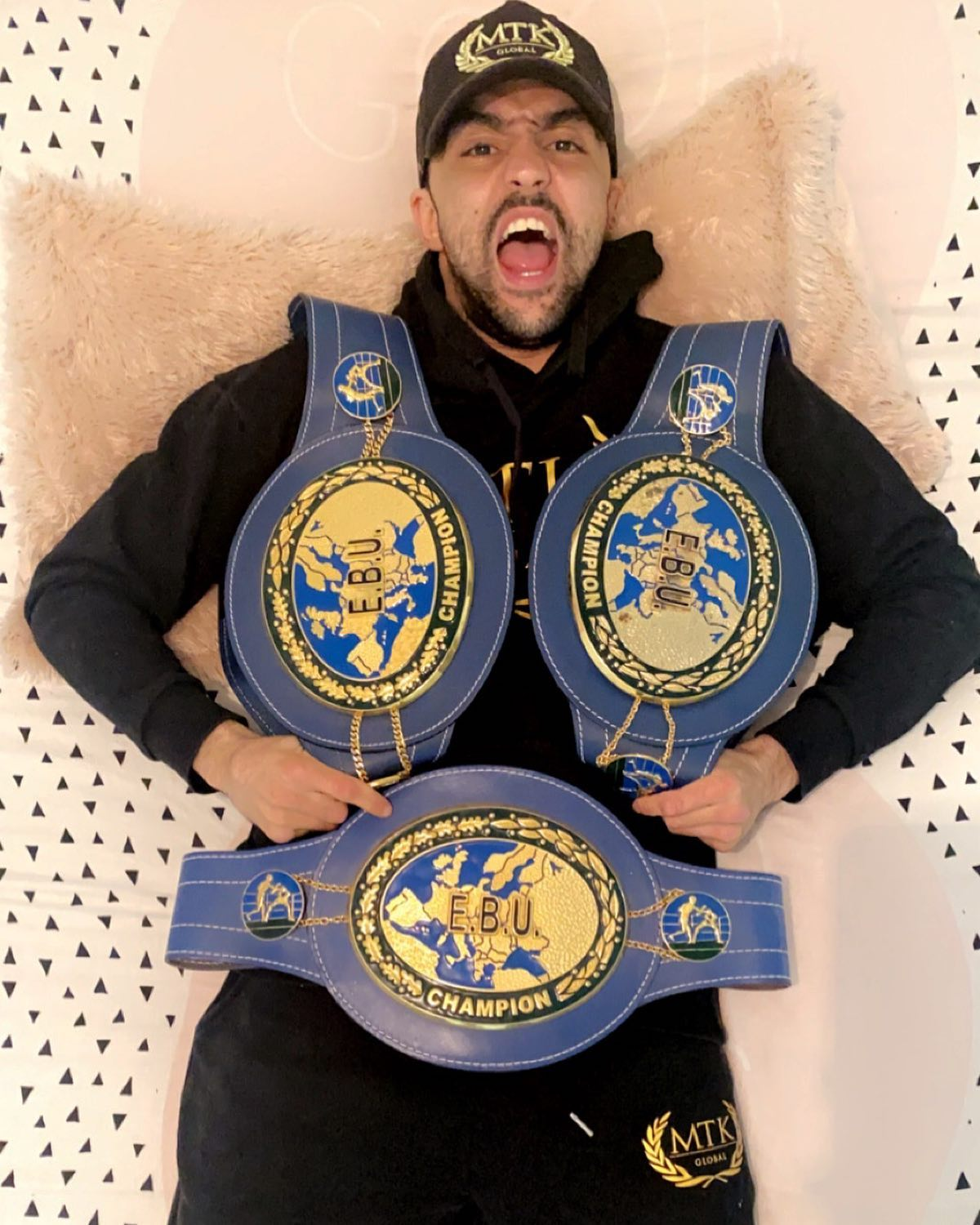

Personal information
- Nationality: Algerian; French
- Born: 8 March 1987 (age 39) Manosque, Alpes-de-Haute-Provence, France
- Height: 5 ft 7 1/2 in (171 cm)
- Weight: Flyweight; Bantamweight; Featherweight

Boxing career
- Reach: 64 in (163 cm)
- Stance: Orthodox

Boxing record
- Total fights: 42
- Wins: 33
- Win by KO: 10
- Losses: 8
- No contests: 1

Karim Guerfi (born 8 March 1987) is a French-Algerian professional boxer. He is a four-time European champion, having held the featherweight title between 2021 and 2022 and the bantamweight title three times between 2013 and 2021. He has also challenged for the WBA interim flyweight title in 2012 and the IBO bantamweight title in 2018.

== Professional career ==
On 11 May 2012, Guerfi fought Juan Carlos Reveco for the interim WBA Flyweight title, but lost by unanimous decision.

On 28 September 2013, Guerfi defeated Stephane Jamoye by majority decision to win the EBU Bantamweight title.

On December 10, 2022, Guerfi was defeated via stoppage in the first round by Michael Conlan at the SSE Arena in Belfast, Northern Ireland.

== Professional boxing record ==
| 42 fights | 33 wins | 8 losses |
|---|---|---|
| By knockout | 10 | 6 |
| By decision | 23 | 2 |
| No contests | 1 | |

| No. | Result | Record | Opponent | Type | Round, time | Date | Location | Notes |
|---|---|---|---|---|---|---|---|---|
| 42 | Loss | 33–8 (1) | Angelo Peña | RTD | 4 (10), 3:00 | 18 Apr 2025 | Stadttheater Bern, Bern, Switzerland | For WBO Inter-Continental super featherweight title |
| 41 | Win | 33–7 (1) | Terry Le Couviour | TKO | 4 (10) | 22 Nov 2024 | Zenith Metropole, Nantes, France | |
| 40 | Win | 32–7 (1) | Hector Betancourt | UD | 8 | 10 Jun 2023 | Parc de Drouille, Manosque, France | |
| 39 | Loss | 31–7 (1) | Michael Conlan | TKO | 1 (12), 2:34 | 10 Dec 2022 | SSE Arena, Belfast, Northern Ireland | |
| 38 | Win | 31–6 (1) | Ricardo Mercado | PTS | 10 | 1 July 2022 | Parc de Drouille, Manosque, France | |
| 37 | Loss | 30–6 (1) | Jordan Gill | KO | 9 (12), 2:59 | 27 Feb 2022 | The O2 Arena, London, England | Lost European featherweight title |
| 36 | Win | 30–5 (1) | Andoni Gago | SD | 12 | 13 Aug 2021 | Plaza de Toros de Puerto Banus, Marbella, Spain | Won European featherweight title |
| 35 | Loss | 29–5 (1) | Lee McGregor | TKO | 1 (12), 2:43 | 19 Mar 2021 | Whites Hotel, Bolton, England | Lost European bantamweight title |
| 34 | Win | 29–4 (1) | Georges Ory | RTD | 9 (12), 3:00 | 23 Nov 2019 | Salle la Soucoupe, Saint-Nazaire, France | Won European bantamweight title |
| 33 | Win | 28–4 (1) | Cristian Narvaez | UD | 8 | 17 Nov 2018 | Espace 3000, Hyères, France | |
| 32 | Win | 27–4 (1) | Nika Kokashvilo | UD | 6 | 25 May 2018 | Palais des Sports Robert, Agde, France | |
| 31 | Loss | 26–4 (1) | Michael Dasmariñas | KO | 4 (12), 0:40 | 20 Apr 2018 | Indoor Stadium, Singapore | For vacant IBO bantamweight title |
| 30 | Win | 26–3 (1) | Stephane Jamoye | TKO | 8 (12), 2:24 | 12 Oct 2017 | Sud de France Arena, Montpellier, France | Retained European bantamweight title |
| 29 | Win | 25–3 (1) | Alexander Cazares | UD | 8 | 5 Oct 2016 | Palais des sports Robert Charpentier, Issy-les-Moulineaux, France | |
| 28 | Win | 24–3 (1) | Ryan Farrag | TKO | 3 (12), 2:03 | 4 Jun 2016 | Echo Arena, Liverpool, England | Won European bantamweight title |
| 27 | Win | 23–3 (1) | Alejandro González, Jr. | UD | 10 | 10 Nov 2015 | Music Hall, Austin, Texas, US | |
| 26 | Win | 22–3 (1) | Arnoldo Solano | UD | 8 | 13 Jun 2015 | Aix-en-Provence, France | |
| 25 | Win | 21–3 (1) | Oscar Trujillo | KO | 1 (10) | 6 Nov 2014 | Palais des Congrès, Digne-les-Bains, France | |
| 24 | Loss | 20–3 (1) | Zhanat Zhakiyanov | KO | 5 (12), 2:39 | 26 Apr 2014 | Ponds Forge, Sheffield, England | Lost European bantamweight title |
| 23 | Win | 20–2 (1) | Stephane Jamoye | MD | 12 | 28 Sep 2013 | Herstal, Belgium | Won European bantamweight title |
| 22 | Loss | 19–2 (1) | Omar Lamiri | SD | 10 | 4 Jul 2013 | Salle Raphael Debarros, Villeurbanne, France | For vacant French bantamweight title |
| 21 | Win | 19–1 (1) | Farid Cassiani | TKO | 1 (10), 2:51 | 20 Apr 2013 | Roberto Durán Arena, Panama City, Panama | Won vacant IBO International flyweight title |
| 20 | NC | 18–1 (1) | Yoan Boyeaux | UD | 10 | 15 Jan 2013 | Palais des Sports, Dijon, France | For vacant French bantamweight title; Originally a UD win for Boyeaux, later ruled a NC after he failed a drug test |
| 19 | Loss | 18–1 | Juan Carlos Reveco | UD | 12 | 11 May 2012 | Orfeo Superdomo, Córdoba, Argentina | For WBA interim flyweight title |
| 18 | Win | 18–0 | Dirceu Cabarca | UD | 6 | 22 Oct 2011 | Roberto Durán Arena, Panama City, Panama | |
| 17 | Win | 17–0 | Daniel Deago | KO | 3 (8), 2:20 | 2 Apr 2011 | Roberto Durán Arena, Panama City, Panama | |
| 16 | Win | 16–0 | Krastan Krastanov | KO | 1 (6) | 3 Dec 2010 | Rene Hartmann Center, Dudelange, Luxembourg | |
| 15 | Win | 15–0 | Faycal Messaoudene | PTS | 6 | 12 Jun 2010 | Salle l'Albanais, Rumilly, France | |
| 14 | Win | 14–0 | Alix Djavoiev | PTS | 6 | 9 Apr 2010 | Centre Omnisports, Massy, France | |
| 13 | Win | 13–0 | Salim Salimov | TKO | 2 (6) | 27 Mar 2010 | Les Varzelles, Manosque, France | |
| 12 | Win | 12–0 | Juma Fundi | KO | 2 (10) | 4 Dec 2009 | Rene Hartmann Center, Dudelange, Luxembourg | Retained IBF Youth flyweight title |
| 11 | Win | 11–0 | Julio Buitrago | UD | 10 | 12 Jun 2009 | Rene Hartmann Center, Dudelange, Luxembourg | Won vacant IBF Youth flyweight title |
| 10 | Win | 10–0 | Alain Bonnel | UD | 10 | 21 Feb 2009 | Les Varzelles, Manosque, France | Won French flyweight title |
| 9 | Win | 9–0 | Alix Djavoiev | PTS | 6 | 6 Dec 2008 | Palais des Sports, Toulon, France | |
| 8 | Win | 8–0 | Lorenzo Ledesma | UD | 6 | 20 Jun 2008 | Dudelange, Luxembourg | |
| 7 | Win | 7–0 | Jacques Patrac | PTS | 6 | 4 Apr 2008 | Palais de la mer, Valras-Plage, France | |
| 6 | Win | 6–0 | Faycal Messaoudene | PTS | 6 | 23 Feb 2008 | Salle Jean Giono, Manosque, France | |
| 5 | Win | 5–0 | Miloud Saadi | PTS | 6 | 14 Dec 2007 | Dudelange, Luxembourg | |
| 4 | Win | 4–0 | Adrian Sandu | UD | 4 | 27 Oct 2007 | Gymnase Municipal, Puget-Théniers, France | |
| 3 | Win | 3–0 | Jeremy Bonnel | UD | 4 | 12 Jun 2007 | La Halle, Martigues, France | |
| 2 | Win | 2–0 | Peter Baláž | PTS | 4 | 10 Mar 2007 | Les Varzelles, Manosque, France | |
| 1 | Win | 1–0 | Elemir Rafael | PTS | 4 | 1 Dec 2006 | Rene Hartmann Center, Dudelange, Luxembourg | |
