= Paul Edwards (boxer) =

English boxer

Personal information
- Nationality: British
- Born: Paul Edwards; 1 October 1986 (age 39)
- Height: 5 ft 5 in (1.65 m)
- Weight: Flyweight

Boxing career
- Stance: Orthodox

Boxing record
- Total fights: 11
- Wins: 9
- Win by KO: 3
- Losses: 2

Paul Edwards (born 1 October 1986) is an English former professional boxer who competed from 2008 to 2012. He held the British flyweight title from 2010 to 2011, and challenged once for the Commonwealth flyweight title in 2012.

== Amateur career ==
Edwards won the 2006 Amateur Boxing Association British flyweight title, when boxing out of the Salisbury ABC.

== Professional career ==
Edwards made his professional debut on 19 July 2008, winning a four-round points decision over Robert Palmer at the Olympia in Liverpool. He won his next 6 fights before facing Shinny Bayaar for the British flyweight title on 15 Dec 2010, at the Kings Hall, Belfast, Northern Ireland. Edwards won by first round technical knockout (TKO) after Bayaar suffered a cut above his left eye.

On 11 June 2011, Edwards made the first defence of his British flyweight title against Chris Edwards at the Olympia, Liverpool. Edwards lost the title by split decision, with one judge’s scorecard reading 115–114, and the other two 113–115.

On 19 May 2012, Edwards challenged Kevin Satchell for the Commonwealth flyweight title at the Aintree Equestrian Centre in Liverpool. Edwards lost via tenth-round stoppage. This would be Edwards' last fight.

== Professional boxing record ==
| 11 fights | 9 wins | 2 losses |
|---|---|---|
| By knockout | 3 | 1 |
| By decision | 6 | 1 |

| No. | Result | Record | Opponent | Type | Round, time | Date | Location | Notes |
|---|---|---|---|---|---|---|---|---|
| 11 | Loss | 9-2 | (United Kingdom) Kevin Satchell | RTD | 10 (12), 1:46 | 19 May 2012 | (United Kingdom) Aintree Equestrian Centre, Liverpool, England | For vacant Commonwealth flyweight title |
| 10 | Win | 9-1 | (Bulgaria) Stefan Slavchev | RTD | 2 (6) | 3 Mar 2012 | (United Kingdom) Hillsborough Leisure Centre, Sheffield, England | |
| 9 | Loss | 8-1 | (United Kingdom) Chris Edwards | SD | 12 | 11 Jun 2011 | (United Kingdom) Olympia, Liverpool, England | Lost British flyweight title |
| 8 | Win | 8-0 | (United Kingdom) Shinny Bayaar | TKO | 1 (12) | 15 Dec 2010 | (United Kingdom) Kings Hall, Belfast, Northern Ireland | Won British flyweight title |
| 7 | Win | 7-0 | (United Kingdom) Anwar Alfadli | PTS | 6 | 28 May 2010 | (United Kingdom) Huddersfield Sports Centre, Huddersfield, England | |
| 6 | Win | 6-0 | (United Kingdom) Andy Bell | PTS | 6 | 5 Feb 2010 | (United Kingdom) Harvey Hadden Leisure Centre, Nottingham, England | |
| 5 | Win | 5-0 | (United Kingdom) Francis Croes | PTS | 6 | 29 May 2009 | (United Kingdom) Fenton Manor Sports Complex, Stoke-on-Trent, England | |
| 4 | Win | 4-0 | (Bulgaria) Itsko Veselinov | TKO | 2 (4) | 17 Apr 2009 | (United Kingdom) Leigh Sports Village, Wigan, England | |
| 3 | Win | 3-0 | (Slovenia) Elemir Rafael | PTS | 4 | 23 Jan 2009 | (United Kingdom) Fenton Manor Sports Complex, Stoke-on-Trent, England | |
| 2 | Win | 2-0 | (United Kingdom) Delroy Spencer | PTS | 4 | 7 Nov 2008 | (United Kingdom) Robin Park Centre, Wigan, England | |
| 1 | Win | 1-0 | (United Kingdom) Robert Palmer | PTS | 4 | 19 Jul 2008 | (United Kingdom) Olympia, Liverpool, England | |
