= Tommy Stubbs =

English boxer (born 1990)

Personal information
- Nationality: English (England)
- Born: Tommy Stubbs; 26 February 1990 (age 36) Oldham, United Kingdom
- Weight: flyweight

Boxing career
- Stance: orthodox

Boxing record
- Total fights: 3
- Wins: 3
- Win by KO: 0
- Losses: 0
- Draws: 0
- No contests: 0

Tommy Stubbs (born 26 February 1990 in Oldham) is an English flyweight boxer.

== Amateur career ==
Stubbs was a top level amateur who won the Amateur Boxing Association British light-flyweight title, when boxing out of the Northside ABC, for three years in a row between 2008 and 2011.

His success in the ring earned him a spot on the England squad for the 2010 Commonwealth Games. However, when he was defeated by Wales' Andrew Selby in the last 16.

Then he earned the North West teenager a place on Great Britain team's podium squad and looked set to go to next year's London Olympics. But he was surprisingly dropped from the squad earlier in the year and decided to turn professional with Ricky Hatton's Hatton Promotions.

== Professional career ==
Stubbs made his professional debut on 24 September 2011 and defeated Anwar Alfadli over four rounds.
