= Shinny Bayaar =

Mongolian boxer

Personal information
- Nationality: British
- Born: Shinebayar Sukhbaatar; 27 August 1977 (age 49) Mongolia

Boxing career
- Weight class: Flyweight
- Stance: Southpaw

Boxing record
- Total fights: 23
- Wins: 15
- Win by KO: 4
- Losses: 6
- Draws: 2

Shinebayar Sukhbaatar 'Shinny Bayaar' (born 27 August 1977) is a Mongolian professional boxer with British nationality fighting in the flyweight division. He is based in Oldham, Greater Manchester and is the former British Flyweight champion.

== Professional career ==
Bayaar's professional debut came on 25 February 2000 in Mongolia with a draw against over fellow Mongolian Yuma Dima. His very next fight saw him travel to the Philippines to meet the experienced Manny Melchor for the WBC International Minimumweight title on 28 June 2000. The fight resulted in a defeat for the novice Bayaar who lost on points over 12 rounds.

Bayaar travelled to the UK and his next contest also ended in defeat, losing over 8 rounds to Damian Dunnion at a small hall show in Stoke on 10 October 2001. He fought only twice more over the next two years winning on each occasion at bills held at the Tara Leisure Centre in Shaw, Greater Manchester. A third defeat for Bayaar came on 20 March 2003 against Nigerian Sunkanmi Ogunbiyi although two more fights that year resulted in two more wins giving Bayaar a professional record of 4-3-1 at the end of 2003.

Three more fights in 2004 saw a mixed bag for the Mongolian, beating unbeaten Norwegian Reidar Walstad with a first round stoppage yet losing to the unbeaten Martin Power on points over 10 rounds. Power would go on to become the British bantamweight champion. Over the next three years Bayaar only had four more fights with only a victory over the then unbeaten Canadian boxer Andrew Singh Kooner on 15 September 2006 standing out. At the end of 2007 Bayaar had improved his professional record to 10-4-1.

== British citizenship and the title ==
Bayaar fought twice in 2008 beating Ghanaian journeyman Sumaila Badu in April and Spaniard Jordi Gallart in November. In 2009 Bayaar trod water with a win over journeyman Daniel Thorpe before having his application for British citizenship granted and being given the opportunity to fight for the British Flyweight title. The fight for the title on 23 October 2009 took place at the Bolton Arena and pitted Bayaar against reigning champion Chris Edwards. Bayaar extended his winning run with a split decision victory over Edwards who later said he was "gobsmacked" by the verdict.

Shinny's first fight of 2010 pitched him against Najah Ali at the Indoor Sports Center in Leigh, the fight was only a six rounder and not a title fight although Bayaar only scored a narrow points victory. The first defence of his title was set for Dagenham on 14 May 2010 against the unbeaten English champion Ashley Sexton. The fight resulted in a draw with Bayaar suffering a nasty cut in the later rounds. On 15 December 2010 Bayaar lost the title to Paul Edwards after an accidental clash of heads in the first round of their fight in Belfast resulted in a deep cut opening in the center of Bayaar's head and the fight being called off. Bayaar next fought on 10 December 2011 and went straight back into British championship action facing former opponent Chris Edwards who had defeated Paul Edwards to reclaim the title earlier in the year. The fight went the distance and resulted in another loss for Bayaar as Edwards successfully defended the title.

== Professional boxing record ==
23 fights	15 wins	6 losses
By knockout	4	1
By decision	11	5
Draws	2	

No.	Result	Record	Opponent	Type	Round, time	Date	Location	Notes
23	Loss	15–6–2	Chris Edwards	UD	12	10 Dec 2011	Leisure Centre, Peterlee, England	For British flyweight title
22	Loss	15–5–2	Paul Edwards	TKO	1 (12), 1:56	15 Dec 2010	King's Hall, Belfast, Northern Ireland	Lost British flyweight title
21	Draw	15–4–2	Ashley Sexton	SD	12	14 May 2010	Goresbrook Leisure Centre, London, England	Retained British flyweight title
20	Win	15–4–1	Najah Salah Ali	PTS	6	19 Mar 2010	Sports Village, Leigh, England	
19	Win	14–4–1	Chris Edwards	SD	12	23 Oct 2009	Arena, Bolton, England	Won British flyweight title
18	Win	13–4–1	Daniel Thorpe	PTS	4	24 May 2009	Tara Leisure Centre, Shaw, England	
17	Win	12–4–1	Jordi Gallart	PTS	10	16 Nov 2008	Tara Leisure Centre, Shaw, England	
16	Win	11–4–1	Sumaila Badu	TKO	2 (6), 1:20	20 Apr 2008	Tara Leisure Centre, Shaw, England	
15	Win	10–4–1	Peter Buckley	PTS	6	11 Mar 2007	Tara Leisure Centre, Shaw, England	
14	Win	9–4–1	Andrew Kooner	TKO	3 (6), 2:56	15 Sep 2006	Alexandra Palace, London, England	
13	Win	8–4–1	Delroy Spencer	PTS	6	2 Apr 2006	Tara Leisure Centre, Shaw, England	
12	Win	7–4–1	Abdul Mghrbel	PTS	4	20 Nov 2005	Tara Leisure Centre, Shaw, England	
11	Loss	6–4–1	Martin Power	PTS	10	11 Dec 2004	ExCeL Arena, London, England	
10	Win	6–3–1	Delroy Spencer	PTS	6	31 Oct 2004	Tara Leisure Centre, Shaw, England	
9	Win	5–3–1	Reidar Walstad	TKO	1 (6), 2:42	21 Feb 2004	National Ice Rink, Cardiff, Wales	
8	Win	4–3–1	Delroy Spencer	PTS	6	19 Oct 2003	Tara Leisure Centre, Shaw, England	
7	Win	3–3–1	Darren Cleary	TKO	2 (6), 2:11	8 Jun 2003	Tara Leisure Centre, Shaw, England	
6	Loss	2–3–1	Sunkanmi Ogunbiyi	PTS	4	20 Mar 2003	Porchester Hall, London, England	
5	Win	2–2–1	Anthony Hanna	PTS	6	17 Nov 2002	Tara Leisure Centre, Shaw, England	
4	Win	1–2–1	Delroy Spencer	PTS	4	9 Dec 2001	Tara Leisure Centre, Shaw, England	
3	Loss	0–2–1	Damien Dunnion	PTS	8	10 Oct 2001	Moat House, Stoke-on-Trent, England	
2	Loss	0–1–1	Manny Melchor	PTS	12	28 Jun 2000	Araneta Coliseum, Quezon City, Philippines	For WBC International mini-flyweight title
1	Draw	0–0–1	Yura Dima	PTS	10	25 Feb 2000	Erdenet, Orkhon Province, Mongolia	

Preceded by Chris Edwards	British Flyweight title 23 October 2009 – 15 December 2010	Succeeded by Paul Edwards
