= Usman Ahmed =

English boxer (born 1981)

Personal information
- Nickname: Uzzy
- Nationality: British
- Born: 21 November 1981 (age 44) Derby, England
- Height: 5 ft 6 in (168 cm)

Boxing career
- Weight class: Flyweight

Boxing record
- Total fights: 19
- Wins: 8
- Win by KO: 0
- Losses: 9
- Draws: 2

Usman "Uzzy" Ahmed (Urdu: عثمان احمد; born 21 November 1981) is a British former professional boxer who competed from 2006 to 2016. He challenged once for the British and Commonwealth flyweight titles in 2009.

== Professional career ==
Ahmed lost on his professional debut via points decision over six rounds to Chris Edwards on 30 September 2006, at the Kings Hall in Stoke-on-Trent.

In his eighth fight, with a record of 5–1–1, he fought Edwards in a rematch on 29 May 2009 at the Fenton Manor Sports Complex, Stoke-on-Trent, with Edwards' British and Commonwealth flyweight titles on the line. Ahmed lost the fight by unanimous decision, with two judges scoring the bout 118–109 and the third scoring it 117–111.

His next fight was a four round points decision victory over Kyle King in December 2009, at the Newport Centre in Newport, Wales. One month later he challenged Ashley Sexton for the vacant English flyweight title, losing via first round knockout. Footage from the fight, showing Ahmed dancing to the ring and then being knocked unconscious with an overhand right became a viral hit online. People close to Ahmed reported that he couldn't understand how he had lost the fight, and, aside from being outmatched, claimed his over confidence was also a factor in him losing.

On 12 October 2011, he fought Don Broadhurst at the Olympia in Liverpool as part of the Prizefighter Series' super flyweight edition. Ahmed lost by unanimous decision over three rounds.

On 23 May 2015, 18 months after his last fight, Ahmed lost a six round points decision to Jamie Williams at the Britannia Hotel in Nottingham. 7 months later, on 13 December, he faced Williams in a rematch at the Hermitage Leisure Centre in Whitwick, this time with the vacant Midlands Area flyweight title on the line, fighting to a points draw over ten rounds. He then fought Williams for a third time on 23 October 2016, at the Hermitage Leisure Centre, again for the vacant Midlands Area flyweight title, this time losing by eighth round technical knockout. This was Ahmed's final fight of his professional career, ending with a record of 8 wins, 9 losses with 2 draws.

== Professional boxing record ==
8 Wins, 9 Losses, 2 Draws
Res.	Record	Opponent	Type	Rd., Time	Date	Location	Notes
