= Jackson Chauke =

South African boxer (born 1985)

Personal information
- Nickname: M3
- Nationality: South African
- Born: 29 May 1985 (age 41) South Africa
- Height: 5 ft 4 in (163 cm)
- Weight: Flyweight

Boxing career
- Stance: Orthodox

Boxing record
- Total fights: 29
- Wins: 24
- Win by KO: 15
- Losses: 3
- Draws: 2
Medal record
Representing South Africa
Men's amateur boxing
Commonwealth Games
Silver medal – second place	2006 Melbourne	Flyweight
All-Africa Games
Silver medal – second place	2007 Algiers	Flyweight

Jackson Van Tonder Chauke (born 29 May 1985) is a South African professional boxer who is a former WBC International and IBO flyweight champion. As an amateur he won silver medals at the 2006 Commonwealth Games and 2007 All-Africa Games, both in the flyweight division.

== Career ==
At Melbourne 2006 he lost the final to Don Broadhurst.

At the AllAfricans he was defeated by local Abderahim Mechenouai.

At the world championships 2007 he lost his first match to Mexican Braulio Ávila.

At the second Olympic qualifier he lost his semi to Cassius Chiyanika but beat Michael Anu for the third qualifying spot.

In Beijing he lost to Anvar Yunusov of Tajikistan, 1:9.

Chauke won the vacant IBO flyweight title with a unanimous decision victory over Kaisy Khademi at York Hall, London, England, on 27 January 2024. He lost the title in his first defense when he was stopped in the second round by Ricardo Malajika at Emperors Palace, Kempton Park, South Africa, on 1 March 2025.

== Professional boxing record ==
29 fights	24 wins	3 losses
By knockout	15	1
By decision	9	2
Draws	2	

No.	Result	Record	Opponent	Type	Round, time	Date	Location	Notes
29	Loss	24–3–2	Ricardo Malajika	KO	12	1 Mar 2025	Emperors Palace, Kempton Park, South Africa	Lost the IBO flyweight title
28	Win	24–2–2	Kaisy Khademi	UD	12	27 Jan 2024	York Hall, London, England	Won the IBO flyweight title
27	Win	23–2–2	Thembelani Nxoshe	PTS	12	1 Oct 2023	Orient Theatre, East London, South Africa	
26	Loss	22–2–2	Phumelele Cafu	SD	12	23 Dec 2022	Orient Theatre, East London, South Africa	
25	Win	22–1–2	Sinethemba Kotana	UD	12	22 Sep 2022	The Gallery, Sandton, Johannesburg, South Africa	Retained African Boxing Union flyweight title
24	Win	21–1–2	Mustafa K Mkupasi	TKO	3 (12)	28 Jul 2022	The Gallery, Sandton, Johannesburg, South Africa	Won vacant African Boxing Union flyweight title
23	Draw	20–1–2	Phumelele Cafu	MD	12	27 Mar 2022	International Convention Centre, East London, South Africa	Retained South African flyweight title.
22	Win	20–1–1	Luyanda Ntwanambi	MD	12	24 Apr 2021	Boardwalk Casino, Gqeberha, South Africa	Retained South African flyweight title, Won vacant WBO Global flyweight title.
21	Win	19–1–1	Mekhdi Abdurashedov	UD	10	19 Sep 2019	Uvais Akhtaev Sports Palace, Grozny, Russia	Won WBC International flyweight title.
20	Win	18–1–1	Sihle Jelwana	KO	1 (12), 2:59	19 Sep 2019	International Convention Centre, East London, South Africa	Won South African flyweight title.
19	Win	17–1–1	Thabang Ramagole	TKO	9 (12), 2:54	28 Apr 2019	Orient Theatre, East London, South Africa	
18	Win	16–1–1	Immanuel Josef	TKO	7 (10)	21 Sep 2018	Carnival City, Brakpan, South Africa	
17	Win	15–1–1	Sihle Jelwana	TKO	4 (12)	23 Mar 2018	Community Centre, Edenvale, South Africa	Won vacant WBF International flyweight title.
16	Win	14–1–1	Zolile Miya	TKO	5 (6)	2 Dec 2017	Kempton Park Indoor Sports Arena, Kempton Park, South Africa	
15	Win	13–1–1	Sibusiso Twani	TKO	9 (10)	1 Jul 2017	Civic Centre Hall, Kempton Park, South Africa	Won vacant Gauteng flyweight title.
14	Win	12–1–1	Mluleki Fukile	TKO	5 (6)	1 Jul 2015	Barnyard Theatre, Rivonia, South Africa	
13	Win	11–1–1	Charity Mukondeleli	KO	3 (6)	29 Aug 2013	Barnyard Theatre, Rivonia, South Africa	
12	Loss	10–1–1	Lwandile Sityatha	UD	12	7 Apr 2013	Orient Theatre, East London, South Africa	For South African flyweight title.
11	Win	10–0–1	Vuyisile Rangxa	TKO	2 (6)	28 Oct 2012	Orient Theatre, East London, South Africa	
10	Win	9–0–1	Mluleki Fukile	UD	6	20 Jul 2012	Birchwood Hotel, Boksburg, South Africa	
9	Win	8–0–1	Nyelisani Thagambega	KO	2 (6)	24 Mar 2012	Carnival City Casino, Brakpan, South Africa	
8	Draw	7–0–1	Mluleki Fukile	TD	2 (6)	11 Jun 2011	Carnival City Casino, Brakpan, South Africa	
7	Win	7–0	Fikile Mlonyeni	UD	6	26 Mar 2011	Nasrec Indoor Arena, Johannesburg, South Africa	
6	Win	6–0	Nelson Lekhuleni	TKO	4 (6)	30 Oct 2010	North West University Hall, Mafikeng, South Africa	
5	Win	5–0	Sandile Mxabanisi	KO	2 (6)	11 Dec 2009	Wembley Indoor Arena, Johannesburg, South Africa	
4	Win	4–0	Sipho Nkadimeng	PTS	6	13 Jun 2009	Graceland Hotel Casino, Secunda, South Africa	
3	Win	3–0	Peter Pelane	PTS	4	2 Apr 2009	Emperors Palace, Kempton Park, South Africa	
2	Win	2–0	Xolile Ngemntu	TKO	3 (4)	17 Nov 2008	Emperors Palace, Kempton Park, South Africa	
1	Win	1–0	Zandisile Twani	TKO	2 (4)	7 Oct 2008	Emperors Palace, Kempton Park, South Africa	
