= Joe Dawson (boxer) =

Retired English boxer

Personal information
- Nationality: (England) English

Sport
- Sport: Boxing

Joseph Dawson is a retired English boxer.

== Boxing career ==
Dawson was twice National Champion in 1978 and 1979 after winning the prestigious ABA light-flyweight title, boxing out of Boston ABC.

He represented England in the -48 kg light-flyweight division, at the 1978 Commonwealth Games in Edmonton, Alberta, Canada.
