= Jack Turner (boxer) =

English boxer (born 2002)

Personal information
- Nickname: El Terrier
- Born: 26 January 2002 (age 24) Liverpool, England
- Weight: Super-flyweight, Bantamweight

Boxing career
- Stance: Orthodox

Boxing record
- Total fights: 14
- Wins: 14
- Win by KO: 13

Jack Turner (born 26 January 2002) is an English professional boxer who competes at super-flyweight and bantamweight.

== Career ==
Having turned professional in May 2023, Turner won his first six fights by first round stoppage.

He had extended his run of victories to nine, including eight inside the distance, by the time he faced Gonzalo Corinaldesi at M&S Bank Arena in Liverpool on the undercard of the Nick Ball vs Ronny Rios world featherweight championship bout on 5 October 2024. Turner knocked out his Argentinian opponent in the opening round.

In his next outing, he took on Peruvian boxer Piero Aponte at the Exhibition Centre in Liverpool on 6 December 2024. Turner knocked his opponent to the canvas three times before the referee brought the contest to a halt just 65 seconds into round one.

Returning to Liverpool's M&S Bank Arena on 15 March 2025, Turner stopped former European bantamweight and Commonwealth super-flyweight champion Ryan Farrag in the second of their scheduled 10-rounds.

Next he defeated the previously unbeaten Nicolas Agustin Muguruza at Planet Ice in Altrincham on 23 August 2025, knocking his opponent to the canvas twice before the refereed stopped the bout in the sixth round.

Turner faced Juan Carlos Martinez Urbina at M&S Bank Arena in Liverpool on 7 February 2026. He won when his opponent, who had been floored in the first round, retired on his stool before start of the fourth.
