= Pungluang Sor Singyu =

Thai boxer (born 1988)

Phuengluang Sor Singyu
Personal information
- Nicknames: Ai-nu mud phuen khon (ไอ้หนูหมัดปืนกล) "Machine Gun Kid"
- Nationality: Thai
- Born: Panya Uthok; September 8, 1988 (age 38) Uthai Thani, Thailand
- Height: 5 ft 4 1/2 in (164 cm)
- Weight: Bantamweight

Boxing career
- Reach: 67 in (170 cm)
- Stance: Orthodox

Boxing record
- Total fights: 65
- Wins: 54
- Win by KO: 36
- Losses: 11

Pungluang Sor Singyu (Thai: ผึ้งหลวง ส.สิงห์อยู่, born September 8, 1988) is a Thai professional boxer in the bantamweight division and he is a former two-time World Boxing Organization (WBO) Bantamweight World Champion.

== Professional career ==
He originally won the title on October 20, 2012, in Manila, Philippines against AJ Banal but he failed to defend it against Namibia's Bantamweight Champion Paulus 'The Rock' Ambunda on 2 March 2013, in his first title defense.

On 12 July 2014, he fought and lost to Tomoki Kameda via technical knockout in round 7 for WBO Bantamweight World Champion at MGM Grand Las Vegas.

He later regained the title by beating Ryo Akaho.

Sor Singyu has been a world champion for the two times on August 7, 2015, with a win against Ryo Akaho Japanese boxer by KO in second round at Ratchaburi Province.

He defended the title one time before losing it to Marlon Tapales on July 27, 2016, via KO in round 11 at Ayutthaya Province, and was injured from a broken jaw since round 9. Both fighters traded knockdowns, but Tapales was the one who had the final say in the 11th round, sending Singyu to the canvas, who was not even close to beating the count.

On 6 September 2020, Sor Singyu fought compatriot Campee Phayom for the WBA Asia super featherweight title. Phayom was boxing well, until the seventh round, when the experienced Singyu knocked him out cold with a powerful punch combination to finish the bout.

== Professional boxing record ==
74 fights	58 wins	16 losses
By knockout	39	6
By decision	19	10

No.	Result	Record	Opponent	Type	Round, time	Date	Location	Notes
74	Loss	58–16	Kosta Skrapis	UD	6	4 May 2024	Towradgi Beach Hotel, Towradgi, Australia	
73	Win	58–15	Saharat Khemkow	TKO	2 (4), 1:47	17 Mar 2024	Singmanassak Muaythai School, Pathum Thani, Thailand	
72	Loss	57–15	Efe Derin Konuk	KO	2 (10), 1:55	27 Jan 2024	FCC Gym, Pattaya, Thailand	
71	Win	57–14	Jiraphat Chomphuwiset	TKO	2 (8), 1:53	3 Dec 2023	Singmanassak Muaythai School, Pathum Thani, Thailand	
70	Loss	56–14	Farrukh Arslonov	UD	10	26 Oct 2023	Spaceplus Bangkok RCA, Bangkok, Thailand	
69	Win	56–13	Rattakorn Tassaworn	UD	8	26 Aug 2023	Singmanassak Muaythai School, Pathum Thani, Thailand	
68	Loss	55–13	John Mannu	TKO	3 (8), 0:32	8 Jul 2023	The Melbourne Pavilion, Flemington, Australia	
67	Loss	55–12	Masahiro Suzuki	KO	2 (8), 1:45	18 Apr 2023	Korakuen Hall, Tokyo, Japan	
66	Win	55–11	Somchai Srijan	TKO	4 (8), 1:18	31 Jul 2022	Singmanassak Muaythai School, Pathum Thani, Thailand	
65	Loss	54–11	Daud Yordan	TKO	6 (10)	1 Jul 2022	Balai Sarbini Convention Hall, Jakarata, Indonesia	For WBC-ABCO Silver super lightweight title
64	Loss	54–10	Chainoi Worawut	UD	10	13 Mar 2021	Workpoint Studio, Bang Phun, Thailand	For WBC-ABCO super bantamweight title
63	Loss	54–9	Amnat Ruenroeng	UD	8	7 Nov 2020	Workpoint Studio, Bang Phun, Thailand	
62	Win	54–8	Campee Phayom	TKO	7 (10), 1:31	6 Sep 2020	Blue Arena, Samut PrakanSamut Prakan	Won WBA Asia super featherweight title
61	Loss	53–8	Genesis Servania	TD	7 (10), 0:57	15 Dec 2019	Sangyo Hall, Kanazawa, Japan	Unanimous TD
60	Loss	53–7	Mark Magsayo	UD	12	31 Aug 2019	Bohol Wisdom School Gym, Tagbilaran, Philippines	For vacant WBC-ABCO featherweight title
59	Win	53–6	Carlo Magali	UD	6	20 Apr 2019	Workpoint Studio, Bang Phun, Thailand	
58	Loss	52–6	Paul Fleming	UD	8	21 Dec 2018	Emporium Function Centre, Bankstown, Australia	
57	Loss	52–5	Czar Amonsot	SD	6	27 Jul 2018	The Melbourne Pavilion, Flemington, Australia	
56	Loss	52–4	Marlon Tapales	KO	11 (12), 0:30	27 Jul 2016	Ayutthaya, Thailand	Lost WBO bantamweight title
55	Win	52–3	Jetro Pabustan	TD	7 (12), 3:00	12 Feb 2016	Soongnern School, Soongnern, Nakhon Ratchasima, Thailand	Retained WBO bantamweight title; Unanimous TD: Fight stopped due to a cut on Pabustan's left eyebrow caused by an accidental headbutt in round 3
54	Win	51–3	Ryo Akaho	KO	2 (12), 1:08	7 Aug 2015	Central Stadium, Ratchaburi, Thailand	Won vacant WBO bantamweight title
53	Win	50–3	Noldi Manakane	KO	3 (12)	6 May 2015	700 Years Anniversary Sports St., Chiang Mai, Thailand	Retained WBO Asia Pacific bantamweight title
52	Win	49–3	Petchchumpol Sor Visetkit	KO	6 (6)	6 Mar 2015	Wat Thatthong School, Bangkok, Thailand	
51	Win	48–3	Eranio Semillano	KO	3 (12)	4 Dec 2014	Royal Square, Bangkok, Thailand	Won vacant WBO Asia Pacific bantamweight title
50	Win	47–3	Fadhili Majiha	UD	12	24 Oct 2014	Wat Amphawa School, Bangkok, Thailand	
49	Loss	46–3	Tomoki Kameda	KO	7 (12), 1:35	12 Jul 2014	MGM Grand Garden Arena, Paradise, Nevada, U.S.	For WBO bantamweight title
48	Win	46–2	Romnick Magos	RTD	2 (12), 3:00	13 Dec 2013	Wat Udommongkol, Huaytalaeng, Nakhon Ratchasima, Thailand	Retained WBO International bantamweight title
47	Win	45–2	Zun Rindam	KO	3 (12)	4 Oct 2013	Chira Prawat Camp, Nakhon Sawan, Thailand	Retained WBO International bantamweight title
46	Win	44–2	Juma Fundi	KO	2 (12), 1:22	10 May 2013	Nongpittayakorn School, Nong Bua, Thailand	Won vacant WBO International bantamweight title
45	Loss	43–2	Paulus Ambunda	UD	12	2 Mar 2013	Windhoek Country Club Resort, Windhoek, Namibia	Lost WBO bantamweight title
44	Win	43–1	A. J. Banal	TKO	9 (12), 1:45	20 Oct 2012	SM Mall of Asia Arena, Pasay, Philippines	Won vacant WBO bantamweight title
43	Win	42–1	Ricardo Roa	TKO	5 (12), 1:46	6 Jul 2012	Nai Yang Beach, Phuket, Thailand	
42	Win	41–1	Rey Megrino	UD	8	4 May 2012	Wat Banraikoksoong, Soongnern, Nakhon Ratchasima Thailand	
41	Win	40–1	Elmar Francisco	UD	12	23 Mar 2012	Bangkok University, Thonburi Campus, Bangkok, Thailand	
40	Win	39–1	Danilo Peña	TD	7 (12), 1:14	2 Dec 2011	Srisamrong, Rawthanjan School, Sukhotkhai Thailand	Unanimous TD
39	Win	38–1	Nathan Bolcio	TKO	2 (12), 2:34	11 Oct 2011	Bangla Boxing Stadium, Patong Thailand	
38	Win	37–1	Marvin Tampus	TKO	6 (10), 2:45	17 Aug 2011	Kaengkrachan District Office, Phetchaburi Thailand	Retained WBO Asia Pacific Youth bantamweight title
37	Win	36–1	Muangkumphee Sakchaichok	TKO	3 (6)	13 Jul 2011	Wat Chang Yai, Thailand	
36	Win	35–1	Yok Sithsaithong	TKO	4 (10), 0:17	25 May 2011	Chulalongkorn University Sport Center, Bangkok, Thailand	Retained WBO Asia Pacific Youth bantamweight title
35	Win	34–1	Paul Apolinario	KO	2 (6), 1:58	25 Apr 2011	Lom Sak, Thailand	Retained WBO Asia Pacific Youth bantamweight title
34	Win	33–1	Freddie Martinez	KO	2 (10), 2:55	4 Feb 2011	Bang Khen, Bangkok, Thailand	Retained WBO Asia Pacific Youth bantamweight title
33	Win	32–1	Phudphadnoi Muangsima	UD	6	7 Jan 2011	Vien, Chiang Khong, Thailand	
32	Win	31–1	Rungrat Naratrikul	PTS	6	1 Oct 2010	Klong 7 Market, Pathum Thani, Thailand	
31	Win	30–1	Worawut Muangsima	TKO	3 (6)	25 Sep 2010	Plabplanarai, Chanthaburi, Thailand	
30	Win	29–1	Joel Rafols	KO	1 (10), 2:14	25 Aug 2010	Western University Bangkok Campus, Pathum Thani, Thailand	Retained WBO Asia Pacific Youth bantamweight title
29	Win	28–1	Khemthong Ror Ror Nonburi	TKO	2 (6), 2:04	2 Apr 2010	Rachanukroh school, Ayutthaya, Thailand	
28	Win	27–1	Elmar Francisco	KO	2 (10)	5 Feb 2010	Theppratanporn Village, Sriracha, Chonburi, Thailand	Retained WBO Asia Pacific Youth bantamweight title
27	Win	26–1	Petchromklao Or Ekarin	KO	2 (6)	4 Dec 2009	Bangkok University, Thonburi Campus, Bangkok, Thailand	
26	Win	25–1	Jilo Merlin	KO	1 (10), 1:32	31 Oct 2009	Banbung, Chonburi, Thailand	Won vacant WBO Asia Pacific Youth bantamweight title
25	Win	24–1	Petchnamchai Jittigym	PTS	6	4 Sep 2009	Chawang, Thailand	
24	Loss	23–1	Stephane Jamoye	SD	10	9 May 2009	Hall Omnisport, Loncin, Belgium	Lost WBC Youth bantamweight title
23	Win	23–0	Adisak Polratok	KO	5 (6)	3 Apr 2009	Samut Sakhon, Thailand	
22	Win	22–0	Eden Sonsona	UD	10	6 Feb 2009	The Office of Pak Hai District, Ayutthaya, Thailand	Retained WBC Youth bantamweight title
21	Win	21–0	Jayson Layson	TKO	4 (10)	12 Sep 2008	The Office of Pak Hai District, Ayutthaya, Thailand	Retained WBC Youth bantamweight title
20	Win	20–0	Wanchana Onesongchai	UD	6	25 Aug 2008	Lat Bua Luang, Thailand	
19	Win	19–0	Lomsaklek Sithkriengkrai	KO	1 (6), 1:35	12 Jun 2008	Rachabhak University, Nakhon Pathom, Thailand	
18	Win	18–0	Pichitchai Twins Gym	UD	6	11 Apr 2008	Bangkok Stadium, Bangkok, Thailand	
17	Win	17–0	Javier Malulan	UD	10	17 Mar 2008	Lat Bua Luang School, Lat Bua Luang, Thailand	Retained WBC Youth bantamweight title
16	Win	16–0	Monico Laurente	UD	10	23 Oct 2007	Wat Takien, Bang Pahan, Thailand	Retained WBC Youth bantamweight title
15	Win	15–0	Ichiro Kikuchi	KO	2 (6), 1:14	15 Jun 2007	Roi Et, Thailand	
14	Win	14–0	Tarek Krab	TKO	2 (10), 2:15	10 May 2007	Bangkok Stadium, Bangkok, Thailand	Retained WBC Youth bantamweight title
13	Win	13–0	Thiti Sit-Kosol	UD	8	5 Dec 2006	Royal Square, Bangkok, Thailand	
12	Win	12–0	Somsak Sithsaithong	TKO	7 (8), 2:52	25 Sep 2006	Nakhon Pathom, Thailand	
11	Win	11–0	Bryan Vicera	TKO	1 (10), 1:51	27 Jul 2006	Ratchaburi, Thailand	Won vacant WBC Youth bantamweight title
10	Win	10–0	Worawatchai Boonjan	KO	2 (6)	8 May 2006	Rajadamnern Stadium, Bangkok, Thailand	
9	Win	9–0	Densayarm Por Mongkolchai	KO	1 (6)	6 Apr 2006	Rajadamnern Stadium, Bangkok, Thailand	
8	Win	8–0	Sornrak Mor Chankasem	TKO	3 (6)	6 Mar 2006	Rajadamnern Stadium, Bangkok, Thailand	
7	Win	7–0	Thiti Sit-Kosol	PTS	6	24 Oct 2005	Rajadamnern Stadium, Bangkok, Thailand	
6	Win	6–0	Thiti Sit-Kosol	PTS	6	22 Sep 2005	Rajadamnern Stadium, Bangkok, Thailand	
5	Win	5–0	Chandet Sithramkamhaeng	KO	2 (6)	10 Jun 2005	Bangkok, Thailand	
4	Win	4–0	Singchai Windy Gym	KO	2 (6)	16 May 2005	Rajadamnern Stadium, Bangkok, Thailand	
3	Win	3–0	Superlek Por Prateong	PTS	6	6 Dec 2004	Rajadamnern Stadium, Bangkok, Thailand	
2	Win	2–0	Saichon Singnumpattana	KO	2 (6)	1 Nov 2004	Rajadamnern Stadium, Bangkok, Thailand	
1	Win	1–0	Singdam Singnumpattana	KO	3 (6)	27 Sep 2004	Rajadamnern Stadium, Bangkok, Thailand	

== See also ==
- List of bantamweight boxing champions

Achievements
Vacant Title last held by Jorge Arce	WBO bantamweight champion October 20, 2012 - March 2, 2013	Succeeded by Paulus Ambunda
Vacant Title last held by Tomoki Kameda	WBO bantamweight champion August 7, 2015 - July 27, 2016	Succeeded by Marlon Tapales
