= Kaisy Khademi =

Afghanistan-born British boxer (born 1994)

Personal information
- Nationality: Afghan; British
- Born: Quaise Khademi; 3 September 1994 (age 31) Kabul, Afghanistan
- Height: 5 ft 6 in (168 cm)
- Weight: Super-flyweight, Flyweight

Boxing career
- Stance: Orthodox

Boxing record
- Total fights: 18
- Wins: 13
- Win by KO: 4
- Losses: 3
- Draws: 2

Quaise Khademi (born 3 September 1994), better known as Kaisy Khademi, is an Afghanistan-born British professional boxer. He challenged for the IBO flyweight title in 2024. Khademi held the WBO European super-flyweight title from December 2019 until February 2021.

== Early life ==
Khademi was born in Kabul, Afghanistan. He fled Afghanistan with members of his extended family due to persecution by the Taliban. On their third attempt, the Khademi family made it to England in 2002 after hiding in a truck en route from the Port of Calais, France, to the Port of Dover. After a brief detention by the British authorities, he was initially housed in Dalston, before moving to Walthamstow. He gained asylum nine years after arriving in England.

== Professional career ==
A professional since 2017 and with a record of seven wins in as many fights, Khademi defeated Pedro Matos at York Hall in London on 14 December 2019, to capture the vacant WBO European super-flyweight title via unanimous decision.

He lost the title in his first defense to Ijaz Ahmed by majority decision on 27 February 2021. Two judges scored the bout 96–94 and 96–95 in favour of his opponent, while the third scored it a draw at 95–95. The vacant IBF European super-flyweight title was also up for grabs in the fight at the Copper Box Arena in London.

The pair met for rematch at the Utilita Arena in Birmingham on 28 August 2021, with the vacant British super-flyweight title on the line. The bout ended in a split draw with the judges' scorecards reading 115–113 for Ahmed, 115–114 for Khademi and 115–115.

With the still vacant British super-flyweight title at stake once again, Khademi and Ahmed faced each other for a third time on 11 June 2022. The fight was held at the International Centre in Telford and also ended in a split draw with one judge favouring Khademi 114–113, one seeing the bout for Ahmed 115–112 and the third ruling it a 114–114 tie.

Khademi fought Jackson Chauke for the vacant IBO flyweight title at York Hall in London on 27 January 2024, losing by unanimous decision.

Back at York Hall on 21 June 2024, he faced Ryan Farrag for the vacant Commonwealth super-flyweight title. Khademi lost via unanimous decision.

== Professional boxing record ==
17 fights	13 wins	2 losses
By knockout	4	0
By decision	9	2
Draws	2	

No.	Result	Record	Opponent	Type	Round, time	Date	Location	Notes
18	Win	13–3–2	Charles Tondo	PTS	6	6 Dec 2025	Rushcliffe Arena, Nottingham, England	
17	Win	12–3–2	Jeison Cervantes	UD	6	4 Oct 2024	Hotel Intercontinental, St. Julian's, Malta	
16	Win	11–3–2	Yin Caicedo	PTS	4	12 Sep 2024	Royal Lancaster Hotel, Lancaster Terrace, London, England	
15	Loss	10–3–2	Ryan Farrag	UD	12	21 Jun 2024	York Hall, London, England	For vacant Commonwealth super-flyweight title
14	Loss	10–2–2	Jackson Chauke	UD	12	27 Jan 2024	York Hall, London, England	For vacant IBO flyweight title
13	Win	10–1–2	Selemani Bangaiza	TKO	2 (10), 1:09	18 Nov 2023	York Hall, London, England	Won vacant IBO Inter-continental super-flyweight title
12	Win	9–1–2	Benn Norman	TKO	3 (10), 1:45	1 Jul 2023	York Hall, London, England	Won vacant IBO Continental super-flyweight title
11	Draw	8–1–2	Ijaz Ahmed	SD	12	11 Jun 2022	Telford International Centre, Telford, England	For vacant British super-flyweight title
10	Draw	8–1–1	Ijaz Ahmed	SD	12	28 Aug 2021	Utilita Arena, Birmingham, England	For vacant British super-flyweight title
9	Loss	8–1	Ijaz Ahmed	MD	10	27 Feb 2021	Copper Box Arena, London, England	Lost WBO European super-flyweight title; For vacant IBF European super-flyweight title
8	Win	8–0	Pedro Matos	UD	10	14 Dec 2019	York Hall, London, England	Won vacant WBO European super-flyweight title
7	Win	7–0	Jemsi Kibazange	PTS	4	12 Oct 2019	York Hall, London, England	
6	Win	6–0	Joel Sanchez	PTS	4	20 Jul 2019	Brentwood Centre, Brentwood, England	
5	Win	5–0	Pablo Narvaez	PTS	10	14 Jul 2018	York Hall, London, England	
4	Win	4–0	Georgi Andonov	KO	3 (6), 0:35	28 Apr 2018	York Hall, London, England	
3	Win	3–0	Georgi Georgiev	TKO	2 (4), 1:44	10 Feb 2018	York Hall, London, England	
2	Win	2–0	Sergey Tasimov	PTS	4	1 Dec 2017	York Hall, London, England	
1	Win	1–0	Reiss Taylor	PTS	4	14 Oct 2017	York Hall, London, England	
