= Abmerk Shindjuu =

Namibian boxer (born 1981)

Personal information
- Nicknames: Scorpion; Dam
- Nationality: Namibian
- Born: November 21, 1981 (age 44) Windhoek, Namibia
- Weight: Flyweight

Boxing career
- Stance: Orthodox

Boxing record
- Total fights: 24
- Wins: 16
- Win by KO: 6
- Losses: 6
- Draws: 2

Abmerk Shindjuu (born 21 November 1981 in Windhoek, Namibia) is a Namibian professional boxer from Windhoek. He is the Namibian flyweight champion and has fought for the Commonwealth flyweight title.

Shindjuu began his first fighting experience with professionals opposed to Petanena Elago. He beat Petanena in his hometown of Oranjemund with a points victory.

He participated in four fights against Simon Negodhi, Negodhi won once, drew twice but Shindjuu then beat Negodhi to win the Namibian title at the Windhoek Country Club Resort in their final fight. Shindjuu lost the belt in his next fight when he was beaten by Joseph Hilongwa on a split decision at the same venue.

He encountered Englishman Chris Edwards for the Commonwealth flyweight titles and fell to a defeat in his homeland and home city. He returns to action against Smangaliso Madonsela in Namibia.
