= Mark Epton =

English boxer (born 1965)

Personal information
- Born: 22 October 1965 (age 60)
Medal record
Men's Boxing
Representing England
Commonwealth Games
Silver medal – second place	1986 Edinburgh	light-flyweight

Mark Epton (born 22 October 1965 in Mexborough, Doncaster) is an English retired flyweight boxer.

== Boxing career ==
=== Amateur career ===
Epton represented England and won a silver medal in the 48 kg light-flyweight division, at the 1986 Commonwealth Games in Edinburgh, Scotland.

He represented Great Britain and Northern Ireland at the 1988 Summer Olympics in Seoul, South Korea. In the round of 64 he defeated Damber Bhatta (Nepal) by decision, 5-0 and in the round of 32 lost to Ivalio Marinov (Bulgaria) by decision, 0–5.

Boxing for the Mexborough Athletic ABC he was a three times winner of the prestigious ABA light-flyweight championship (1985, 1986 and 1987).

=== Professional career ===
Nicknamed "The Choirboy" he made his professional debut on 24 May 1989. After six bouts as a pro, which he all won, Epton retired from boxing.
