= Ijaz Ahmed (boxer) =

British boxer (born 1993)

Personal information
- Nickname: Jazzy
- Born: 6 April 1993 (age 33) Birmingham, West Midlands, England
- Height: 5 ft 5 in (165 cm)
- Weight: Flyweight, Super-flyweight

Boxing career
- Stance: Orthodox

Boxing record
- Total fights: 18
- Wins: 11
- Win by KO: 1
- Losses: 4
- Draws: 3

Ijaz Ahmed (born 6 April 1993) is a British professional boxer. He held the WBO European and IBF European super-flyweight titles in 2021.

== Early life ==
Ahmed was born in Birmingham and is of Pakistani descent.

== Professional career ==
Ahmed made his professional debut on 11 November 2017, scoring a four-round points decision victory against Craig Derbyshire at The Venue in Edgbaston.

After compiling a record of four wins and one loss, he defeated Conar Blackshaw on points over 10 rounds, capturing the vacant Midlands Area flyweight title on 9 December 2018 at the Holiday Inn in Birmingham.

Following two more wins, he faced Harvey Horn for the vacant WBO European flyweight title on 18 November 2018 at the London Hilton on Park Lane. Scheduled for 10 rounds, Ahmed suffered the second defeat of his career, losing via unanimous decision.

In his next fight he moved up a weight class, challenging reigning champion Kaisy Khademi for his WBO European super-flyweight title, with the vacant IBF European title also on the line. Taking place on 27 February 2021 at the Copper Box Arena in London, Ahmed emerged victorious, defeating Khademi via majority decision. Two judges scored the bout 96–94 and 96–95 in favour of Ahmed, while the third judge scored it a draw at 95–95.

The pair had an immediate rematch on 28 August 2021 at the Utilita Arena, with the vacant British super-flyweight title on the line. After the twelve rounds were complete the bout ended in a split draw with the judges' scorecards reading 115–113 for Ahmed, 115–114 for Khademi and 115–115, leaving the British title vacant.

With the still vacant British super-flyweight title at stake once again, Ahmed and Khademi faced each other for a third time on 11 June 2022. The fight was held at the International Centre in Telford and also ended in a split draw with one judge favouring Ahmed 115–112, one seeing the bout for Khademi 114–113 and the third ruling it a 114–114 tie.

On 17 March 2023, he faced Marcel Braithwaite for the vacant British and Commonwealth super-flyweight titles. Held at the Town Hall in Dudley, the fight ended in a split draw with one judge scoring the fight 117–111 for Ahmed, one awarding it to his opponent by 114–113 and the third unable to separate the boxers at 114–114.

A rematch took place at the Holiday Inn in Birmingham on 20 October 2023, by which time Braithwaite had become Commonwealth super-flyweight champion while the British belt remained vacant. With both titles once more on the line, Ahmed was knocked to the canvas twice in the ninth round before the referee stepped in to stop the fight.

He made another attempt to win the Commonwealth super-flyweight title when he challenged Matthew McHale at Portobello Town Hall in Edinburgh on 21 November 2025, but again fell short, losing via technical knockout in the 11th round after the referee decided an eye injury Ahmed had sustained was too severe for him to continue.

== Professional boxing record ==
| 18 fights | 11 wins | 4 losses |
|---|---|---|
| By knockout | 1 | 2 |
| By decision | 10 | 2 |
| Draws | 3 | |

| No. | Result | Record | Opponent | Type | Round, time | Date | Location | Notes |
|---|---|---|---|---|---|---|---|---|
| 18 | Loss | 11–4–3 | Matthew McHale | TKO | 11 (12) | 21 Nov 2025 | Portobello Town Hall, Edinburgh, Scotland | For the Commonwealth super-flyweight title |
| 17 | Wim | 11–3–3 | Jake Pollard | TKO | 4 | 11 Oct 2025 | Holiday Inn, Birmingham, England | For the Commonwealth super-flyweight and vacant British super-flyweight titles |
| 16 | Loss | 10–3–3 | Marcel Braithwaite | TKO | 9 (12) | 20 Oct 2023 | Holiday Inn, Birmingham, England | For the Commonwealth super-flyweight and vacant British super-flyweight titles |
| 15 | Draw | 10–2–3 | Marcel Braithwaite | SD | 12 | 17 Mar 2023 | Town Hall, Dudley, England | For vacant British and Commonwealth super-flyweight titles |
| 14 | Draw | 10–2–2 | Kaisy Khademi | SD | 12 | 11 Jun 2022 | Telford International Centre, Telford, England | For vacant British super-flyweight title |
| 13 | Win | 10–2–1 | Luke Merrifield | PTS | 4 | 27 Mar 2022 | Willows Banqueting Suite, Bath Street, Willenhall, England | |
| 12 | Win | 9–2–1 | Alejandro Torres | TKO | 5 (6) | 2 Dec 2021 | Holiday Inn, Birmingham, England | |
| 11 | Draw | 8–2–1 | Kaisy Khademi | SD | 12 | 28 Aug 2021 | Utilita Arena, Birmingham, England | For vacant British super-flyweight title |
| 10 | Win | 8–2 | Kaisy Khademi | MD | 10 | 27 Feb 2021 | Copper Box Arena, London, England | Won WBO European and vacant IBF European super-flyweight titles |
| 9 | Loss | 7–2 | Harvey Horn | UD | 10 | 18 Nov 2019 | London Hilton on Park Lane, London, England | For vacant WBO European flyweight title |
| 8 | Win | 7–1 | Pablo Narvaez | PTS | 6 | 28 Jul 2019 | The Venue, Dudley, England | |
| 7 | Win | 6–1 | Matt Windle | PTS | 10 | 15 Mar 2019 | H Suite, Birmingham, England | Retained Midlands Area flyweight title |
| 6 | Win | 5–1 | Conar Blackshaw | PTS | 10 | 9 Dec 2018 | Holiday Inn, Birmingham, England | Won vacant Midlands Area flyweight title |
| 5 | Win | 4–1 | Anwar Alfadli | PTS | 6 | 21 Jul 2018 | Town Hall, Walsall, England | |
| 4 | Loss | 3–1 | Brett Fidoe | PTS | 4 | 5 May 2018 | Holte Suite at Villa Park, Birmingham, England | |
| 3 | Win | 3–0 | Gary Reeve | PTS | 4 | 14 Oct 2017 | Town Hall, Walsall, England | |
| 2 | Win | 2–0 | Sergey Tasimov | PTS | 4 | 4 Mar 2017 | Town Hall, Walsall, England | |
| 1 | Win | 1–0 | Craig Derbyshire | PTS | 4 | 11 Nov 2016 | The Venue, Birmingham, England | |

Sporting positions
Regional boxing titles
| Vacant Title last held by Jamie Williams | Midlands Area flyweight champion 9 December 2018 – November 2019 | Vacant Title next held by David Seymour |
| Inaugural champion | IBF European super-flyweight champion 27 February 2021 – August 2021 | Vacant |
| Preceded by Kaisy Khademi | WBO European super-flyweight champion 27 February 2021 – ? | Vacant |
