= Ryan Farrag =

English boxer (born 1988)

Personal information
- Nationality: British
- Born: 6 February 1988 (age 38) Liverpool, Merseyside, England
- Weight: Super-flyweight; Bantamweight

Boxing career
- Stance: Orthodox

Boxing record
- Total fights: 29
- Wins: 23
- Win by KO: 6
- Losses: 6

Ryan Farrag (born 6 February 1988) is an English professional boxer. He held the European bantamweight title from 2015 to 2016 and the Commonwealth super-flyweight title in 2024.

== Professional career ==
On 30 October 2015 at Hall Omnisport de La Préalle in Herstal, Belgium, Farrag defeated Stephane Jamoye by ninth-round knockout to win the vacant European bantamweight title.

He lost the title in his first defense against Karim Guerfi at the Echo Arena in Liverpool on 4 June 2016, going down by third round stoppage.

Farrag faced Marcel Braithwaite for the vacant Commonwealth super-flyweight title at Liverpool Olympia on 9 June 2023, losing via unanimous decision

He became Commonwealth super-flyweight champion at the second attempt, claiming the vacant title with a unanimous decision victory over Quaise Khademi at York Hall in London on 21 June 2024.

== Professional boxing record ==
29 fights	23 wins	6 losses
By knockout	6	2
By decision	17	4

No.	Result	Record	Opponent	Type	Round, time	Date	Location	Notes
29	Loss	23–6	(United Kingdom) Jack Turner	TKO	2 (10)	15 Mar 2025	(United Kingdom) Echo Arena, Liverpool, England	
28	Win	23–5	(Tanzania) Adam Yahaya	PTS	6	15 Nov 2024	(United Kingdom) Olympia, Liverpool, England	
27	Win	22–5	(United Kingdom) Quaise Khademi	UD	12	21 Jun 2024	(United Kingdom) York Hall, London, England	Won the vacant Commonwealth super-flyweight title
26	Loss	21–5	(United Kingdom) Marcel Braithwaite	UD	12	9 Jun 2023	(United Kingdom) Olympia, Liverpool, England	For vacant Commonwealth super-flyweight title
25	Win	21–4	(Bulgaria) Georgi Georgiev	KO	2 (6), 1:50	25 Feb 2023	Hilton Hotel Portomaso, St Julian's, Malta	
24	Win	20–4	(Nicaragua) Elvis Guillen	PTS	6	4 Aug 2019	Plaza de Toros de Puerto Banus, Marbella, Spain	
23	Loss	19–4	(United Kingdom) Sunny Edwards	UD	10	26 Oct 2018	(United Kingdom) York Hall, Bethnal Green, England	For WBO European super-flyweight title
22	Win	19–3	(Ecuador) Jefferson Vargas	TKO	5 (6)	4 Aug 2018	Palacio de Congresos, Marbella, Spain	
21	Win	18–3	(Nicaragua) Jose Hernandez	PTS	6	16 Mar 2018	(United Kingdom) Greenbank Sports Academy, Liverpool, England	
20	Win	17–3	(Nicaragua) Jose Aguilar	PTS	4	23 Sep 2017	(United Kingdom) Manchester Arena, Manchester, England	
19	Loss	16–3	(United Kingdom) Ryan Burnett	UD	12	15 Oct 2016	(United Kingdom) Echo Arena, Liverpool, England	For British bantamweight title
18	Win	16–2	(Nicaragua) Elvis Guillen	PTS	4	3 Sep 2016	(United Kingdom) Robin Park Centre, Wigan, England	
17	Loss	15–2	(France) Karim Guerfi	TKO	3 (12), 2:03	4 Jun 2016	(United Kingdom) Echo Arena, Liverpool, England	Lost European bantamweight title
16	Win	15–1	(Bulgaria) Stefan Slavchev	TKO	2 (8), 2:12	12 Mar 2016	(United Kingdom) Echo Arena, Liverpool, England	
15	Win	14–1	(Belgium) Stephane Jamoye	TKO	9 (12)	30 Oct 2015	(Belgium) Hall Omnisport de La Préalle, Herstal, England	Won vacant European bantamweight title
14	Win	13–1	(United Kingdom) Ashley Lane	TKO	7 (10), 2:03	13 Dec 2014	(United Kingdom) Hillsborough Leisure Centre, Sheffield, England	Won vacant English bantamweight title
13	Win	12–1	(Moldova) Gennadiy Delisandru	PTS	8	24 May 2014	(United Kingdom) Deeside Leisure Centre, Queensferry, Wales	
12	Win	11–1	(United Kingdom) Jason Booth	TKO	4 (8), 2:37	8 Mar 2014	(United Kingdom) Aintree Equestrian Centre, Liverpool, England	
11	Win	10–1	(United Kingdom) Sid Razak	PTS	6	12 Oct 2013	(United Kingdom) De Vere Whites Hotel, Bolton, England	
10	Win	9–1	(Iraq) Najah Ali	PTS	6	24 May 2013	(United Kingdom) Olympia, Liverpool, England	
9	Win	8–1	(United Kingdom) Gareth Smith	PTS	4	13 Oct 2012	(United Kingdom) Echo Arena, Liverpool, England	
8	Win	7–1	(United Kingdom) Ian Bailey	PTS	6	30 Jun 2012	(United Kingdom) Olympia, Liverpool, England	
7	Win	6–1	(Bulgaria) Galin Paunov	PTS	4	10 Mar 2012	(United Kingdom) Olympia, Liverpool, England	
6	Loss	5–1	(United Kingdom) Lee Haskins	UD	3	12 Oct 2011	(United Kingdom) Olympia, Liverpool, England	Prizefighter: The Super-flyweights – Semi-final
5	Win	5–0	(United Kingdom) Craig Lyon	UD	3	12 Oct 2011	(United Kingdom) Olympia, Liverpool, England	Prizefighter: The Super-flyweights – Quarter-final
4	Win	4–0	(United Kingdom) Marc Callaghan	PTS	4	11 Jun 2011	(United Kingdom) Olympia, Liverpool, England	
3	Win	3–0	(Bulgaria) Hyusein Hyuseinov	PTS	4	27 Apr 2011	(United Kingdom) Olympia, Liverpool, England	
2	Win	2–0	(United Kingdom) Delroy Spencer	PTS	6	19 Mar 2011	(United Kingdom) Robin Park Centre, Wigan, England	
1	Win	1–0	(Kuwait) Anwar Alfadli	PTS	4	22 Oct 2010	(United Kingdom) Robin Park Centre, Wigan, England	
