= Harvey Horn =

English boxer (born 1995)

Personal information
- Nicknames: Horny; Triple H (Horny Harvey Horn)
- Born: 5 October 1995 (age 31) London, England
- Height: 5 ft 2 in (157 cm)
- Weight: Flyweight

Boxing career
- Stance: Southpaw

Boxing record
- Total fights: 14
- Wins: 13
- Win by KO: 2
- Losses: 1
Medal record
Men's amateur boxing
Representing England
European Championships
Silver medal – second place	2015 Samokov	Light-flyweight
European U22 Championships
Gold medal – first place	2017 Braila	Light-flyweight

Harvey Horn (born 5 October 1995) is an English professional boxer who has held the WBO European flyweight title since 2019. As an amateur he won a silver medal in the light-flyweight division at the 2015 European Championships.

== Early life ==
Harvey Horn was born on 5 October 1995 in London, England. His introduction to combat sports came through karate, earning a brown belt at the age of 10. Not long before turning 11, he began boxing at the Gator ABC gym in Woodford, East London. During his early years he had ambitions to follow in his father and uncle's footsteps and become a stockbroker. Winning his first national title at the age of 15 sent him closer to choosing his career path. He gained good grades from his GCSEs; an A* along with As and Bs, and stayed on for sixth form while still participating in boxing. When the decision came down to choosing between further education and boxing, he settled on boxing, saying, "When I got to Sixth Form at school, I thought, I could either go the A-Level route or maybe do a BTEC and still do the boxing. I had a meeting with the head teacher and asked if it was possible to combine them, and he said no problem. But within two weeks it was too much. Compared to the workload of the GCSEs and with the boxing training, something had to give. I chose to carry on with the boxing, do an easier BTEC and came out with three A-Level equivalents."

== Amateur career ==
As an amateur he won the 2014 ABA Championships, a silver medal at the 2015 European Championships and gold at the European U22 Championships. He also competed at the 2015 European Games and the 2015 World Championships.

== Professional career ==
Horn made his professional debut on 9 December 2017, scoring a third-round technical knockout (TKO) victory over Denis Bartos at the Copper Box Arena in London.

After compiling a record of 7–0 (2 KOs) he defeated Ijaz Ahmed via unanimous decision (UD) over ten rounds, capturing the vacant WBO European flyweight title on 18 November 2019 at the Hilton Hotel in London. Two judges scored the bout 97–93 while the third scored it 96–94.

== Professional boxing record ==
14 fights	13 wins	1 loss
By knockout	2	1
By decision	11	0

No.	Result	Record	Opponent	Type	Round, time	Date	Location	Notes
14	Win	13–1	Adam Yahaya	PTS	6	4 Apr 2025	Stamford Bridge Stadium Conference Suite, Chelsea, England	
13	Win	12–1	Jimmy Delgadillo	UD	5	5 Oct 2024	Jacob Brown Auditorium, Brownsville, USA	
12	Win	11–1	Stephen Jackson	PTS	6	17 Jun 2023	Brentwood Centre, Essex, England	
11	Win	10–1	Alejandro Torres	PTS	6	13 May 2022	Indigo at the O2, London, England	
10	Loss	9–1	Fadhili Majiha	TKO	4 (10), 2:32	25 Nov 2021	York Hall, London, England	
9	Win	9–0	Adam Yahaya	PTS	6	2 Oct 2021	Wembley Arena, London, England	
8	Win	8–0	Ijaz Ahmed	UD	10	18 Nov 2019	London Hilton on Park Lane, London, England	Won vacant WBO European flyweight title
7	Win	7–0	Elvis Guillen	PTS	8	14 Sep 2019	York Hall, London, England	
6	Win	6–0	Joel Sanchez	PTS	6	18 May 2019	Lamex Stadium, Stevenage, England	
5	Win	5–0	Patrik Bartos	TKO	1 (4), 2:03	8 Mar 2019	Royal Albert Hall, London, England	
4	Win	4–0	Adam Hutchinson	PTS	6	22 Dec 2018	Manchester Arena, Manchester, England	
3	Win	3–0	Gyula Dodu	PTS	4	23 Jun 2018	The O2 Arena, London, England	
2	Win	2–0	Patrik Bartos	PTS	4	24 Feb 2018	York Hall, London, England	
1	Win	1–0	Denis Bartos	TKO	3 (4), 1:39	9 Dec 2017	Copper Box Arena, London, England	
