= Chris Edwards (boxer) =

British professional boxer

Personal information
- Nationality: British
- Born: Chris Edwards; 6 May 1976 Stoke-on-Trent, England
- Died: 30 March 2018 (aged 41) Stoke-On-Trent
- Weight: Flyweight; Super flyweight

Boxing career
- Stance: Orthodox

Boxing record
- Total fights: 36
- Wins: 17
- Win by KO: 4
- Losses: 15
- Draws: 4
- No contests: 0

Chris Edwards (6 May 1976 – 30 March 2018) was a British professional boxer who competed from 1998 to 2012. He held the British super flyweight title in 2007, the British flyweight title twice between 2009 and 2012, and the Commonwealth flyweight title from 2009 to 2010.

== Career ==
=== The journeyman ===
Edwards made his professional debut in the Welsh town of Ebbw Vale in April 1998, beating Chris Thomas via a technical knockout in the second round. The victory was to be his last for the next two years. Fighting a further six times between September 1998 and September 2000 Edwards went on to lose on all six occasions. Despite his long run of defeats Edwards managed to stem the tide of defeat with two victories coming in October and November 2000 allowing him to end the year with a pro record of won three, lost six. The next year saw Edwards revert to the journeyman type with four fights resulting in a further two defeats against one draw and one win against Neil Read.

Read was also to prove Edwards solitary opponent throughout the whole of 2002 when in October of that year the two men met one more. Edwards picked up his fifth pro win (2nd against Read) with a points victory over six rounds at the Kings Hall in Stoke-on-Trent. Only one fight followed in 2003 with Edwards this time losing to future British and Commonwealth champion Lee Haskins in June again over six rounds.

In 2004, Edwards fought three times and scored a third victory over Neil Read to this time pick up the vacant Midlands Area super bantamweight title, the first professional title of his career. At the time of the contest for the belt Read had a combined record of 3-20-1 against Edwards 5-9-2. The contest which took place during September at the Kings Hall saw Edwards claim victory via technical knockout in the second round. Further results during the year saw a draw against old foe Delroy Spencer in April and a defeat to future British title challenger Colin Moffett in October.

After the Moffett fight another period of inactivity followed for Edwards and he would not fight again until November 2005, meeting Delroy Spencer for the third time, this time scoring a points victory over four rounds. In February 2006 he lost to Gary Ford and then travelled to Italy in March 2006 to meet Andrea Sarritzu the reigning European champion in a non-title fight. It was the first time Edwards had travelled abroad to fight professionally and the fight ended with the champion knocking Edwards out in the fourth round.

=== The English champion ===
Edwards rebounded from his Italian adventure by scoring victories later in the year over novice fighters Gary Shiel and Usman Ahmed. The wins set Edwards up for a shot at the vacant English flyweight title against Huddersfield's former Commonwealth champion, Dale Robinson who entered the contest with a professional record of 19-2-1 making him a strong favourite to win considering Edwards' record of 9-12-1. The fight, at the Kings Hall, Stoke-on-Trent in November 2006 resulted in one of the upsets of the year with Edwards scoring a TKO in the eighth round to lift his second professional title and the English championship.

A rematch between the two fighters in April 2007 saw both fighters meet in Altrincham for the vacant British and Commonwealth flyweight titles. In one of the fights of the year, Edwards and Robinson battled to a draw over 12 rounds meaning that neither would leave with the belts. After the fight Robinson announced his retirement from the sport.

=== British and Commonwealth champion ===
Following the introduction of the super-flyweight division to British boxing, Edwards was mandated to fight for the inaugural British title against Doncaster's undefeated Jamie McDonnell. The fight, in December 2007, saw Edwards claim the title in another close fight-of-the-year contender with a split-decision victory. His reign as champion was short-lived, however, as he lost the title in his first defence, against Andy Bell, in a 12-round fight.

Edwards fought once more for a title in January 2009, this time moving back down to flyweight to challenge once more for the still-vacant British and Commonwealth flyweight titles. The fight in Edwards' home town of Stoke against fellow challenger Wayne Bloy saw Edwards pick up both belts when Bloy retired hurt in the fourth round. On 29 May 2009, Edwards made the first defence of his new title with a 12-round decision over a man he had defeated previously, Derby's Usman Ahmed. Edwards lost the title, fighting in Bolton to Shinny Bayaar, a Mongolian fighter who had recently gained British nationality, making him eligible to the fight for the belt.

The loss against Bayaar had also meant the loss of Edwards' Commonwealth title, which, despite not being on the line, had to be given up following the defeat to another Commonwealth fighter. On 19 February 2010, he returned to Stoke-on-Trent to fight for the now-vacant belt, beating Namibian Abmerk Shindjuu in 12 rounds, winning 115-114 on each of the judges' scorecards. Edwards was victorious over Francis Croes in four rounds on 4 December 2010, and then regained the British title with a victory in a closely fought contest against Paul Edwards at the Olympia in Liverpool on 11 June 2011. Edwards made a successful defence on 10 December 2011 over the man who had previously beaten him, Shinny Bayaar.

== Death ==
On 30 March 2018, Edwards died of sudden arrhythmic death syndrome.

== Professional boxing record ==
36 fights	17 wins	15 losses
By knockout	4	4
By decision	13	11
Draws	4	

No.	Result	Record	Opponent	Type	Round, time	Date	Location	Notes
36	Loss	17-15-4	(United Kingdom) Kevin Satchell	TKO	6 (12)	13 Oct 2012	(United Kingdom) Echo Arena, Liverpool, England	Lost British flyweight title
35	Draw	17-14-4	(United Kingdom) Anwar Alfadli	PTS	6	29 Jun 2012	(United Kingdom) Queens Theatre, Stoke-on-Trent, England	
34	Win	17-14-3	(United Kingdom) Shinny Bayaar	UD	12	10 Dec 2011	(United Kingdom) Peterlee Leisure Centre, Peterlee, England	Retained British flyweight title
33	Win	16-14-3	(United Kingdom) Paul Edwards	SD	12	11 Jun 2011	(United Kingdom) Olympia, Liverpool, England	Retained British flyweight title
32	Win	15-14-3	(United Kingdom) Francis Croes	PTS	4	4 Dec 2010	(United Kingdom) Palace Hotel, Manchester, England	
31	Win	14-14-3	(Namibia) Abmerk Shindjuu	UD	12	19 Feb 2010	(United Kingdom) Fenton Manor Sports Complex, Stoke-on-Trent, England	Won vacant Commonwealth flyweight title
30	Loss	13-14-3	(Monaco) Shinny Bayaar	SD	12	23 Oct 2009	(United Kingdom) Bolton Arena, Bolton, England	Lost British flyweight title
29	Win	13-13-3	(United Kingdom) Usman Ahmed	UD	12	29 May 2009	(United Kingdom) Fenton Manor Sports Complex, Stoke-on-Trent, England	Retained British and Commonwealth flyweight titles
28	Win	12-13-3	(United Kingdom) Wayne Bloy	RTD	4 (12)	23 Jan 2009	(United Kingdom) Fenton Manor Sports Complex, Stoke-on-Trent, England	Won vacant British and Commonwealth flyweight titles
27	Loss	11-13-3	(United Kingdom) Andy Bell	UD	12	28 Mar 2008	(United Kingdom) Metrodome, Barnsley, England	Lost British super flyweight title
26	Win	11-12-3	(United Kingdom) Jamie McDonnell	SD	12	8 Dec 2007	(United Kingdom) JJB Stadium, Wigan, England	Won vacant British super flyweight title
25	Draw	10-12-3	(United Kingdom) Dale Robinson	PTS	12	13 Apr 2007	(United Kingdom) Altrincham Leisure Centre, Cheshire, Wngland	For vacant British and Commonwealth flyweight titles
24	Win	10-12-2	(United Kingdom) Dale Robinson	TKO	8 (10)	24 Nov 2006	(United Kingdom) Kings Hall, Stoke-on-Trent, England	Won vacant English flyweight title
23	Win	9-12-2	(United Kingdom) Usman Ahmed	PTS	6	30 Sep 2006	(United Kingdom) Kings Hall, Stoke-on-Trent, England	
22	Win	8-12-2	(United Kingdom) Gary Sheil	PTS	6	6 May 2006	(United Kingdom) Kings Hall, Stoke-on-Trent, England	
21	Loss	7-12-2	(Italy) Andrea Sarritzu	KO	4 (6)	10 Mar 2006	Palasport, Bergamo, Italy	
20	Loss	7-11-2	(United Kingdom) Gary Ford	PTS	4	18 Feb 2006	(United Kingdom) Kings Hall, Stoke-on-Trent, England	
19	Win	7-10-2	(United Kingdom) Delroy Spencer	PTS	4	12 Nov 2005	(United Kingdom) Kings Hall, Stoke-on-Trent, England	
18	Loss	6-10-2	(United Kingdom) Colin Moffett	PTS	4	28 Oct 2004	(United Kingdom) Ulster Hall, Belfast, Northern Ireland	
17	Win	6-9-2	(United Kingdom) Neil Read	TKO	2 (10)	26 Sep 2004	(United Kingdom) Kings Hall, Stoke-on-Trent, England	Won vacant BBBofC Midlands Area super bantamweight title
16	Draw	5-9-2	(United Kingdom) Delroy Spencer	PTS	6	23 Apr 2004	(United Kingdom) Ramada Jarvis Hotel, Leicester, England	
15	Loss	5-9-1	(United Kingdom) Lee Haskins	PTS	6	13 Jun 2003	(United Kingdom) Ashton Gate, Bristol, England	
14	Win	5-8-1	(United Kingdom) Neil Read	PTS	6	10 Oct 2002	(United Kingdom) Kings Hall, Stoke-on-Trent, England	
13	Win	4-8-1	(United Kingdom) Neil Read	PTS	8	6 Dec 2001	(United Kingdom) Moat House, Stoke-on-Trent, England	
12	Loss	3-8-1	(United Kingdom) Levi Pattison	PTS	4	8 Oct 2001	(United Kingdom) Metrodome, Barnsley, England	
11	Draw	3-7-1	(United Kingdom) Darren Taylor	PTS	6	3 Jun 2001	(United Kingdom) The Void, Hanley, England	
10	Loss	3-7	(United Kingdom) Jamie Evans	PTS	6	16 Mar 2001	(United Kingdom) Mountbatten Centre, Portsmouth, England	
9	Win	3-6	(United Kingdom) Levi Pattison	PTS	4	27 Nov 2000	(United Kingdom) Aston Villa Leisure Centre, Birmingham, England	
8	Win	2-6	(United Kingdom) Andy Roberts	PTS	4	7 Oct 2000	(United Kingdom) Doncaster Dome, Doncaster, England	
7	Loss	1-6	(United Kingdom) Paddy Folan	PTS	6	15 May 2000	(United Kingdom) Stakis Hotel, Bradford, England	
6	Loss	1-5	(United Kingdom) Daniel Ring	PTS	4	3 Dec 1999	(United Kingdom) Bushfield Leisure Centre, Peterborough, England	
5	Loss	1-4	(United Kingdom) Lee Georgiou	TKO	2 (4)	19 Oct 1999	(United Kingdom) York Hall, London, England	
4	Loss	1-3	(United Kingdom) Stevie Quinn	TKO	4 (6)	17 Apr 1999	(Republic of Ireland) National Stadium, Dublin, Ireland	
3	Loss	1-2	(United Kingdom) Delroy Spencer	PTS	6	26 Feb 1999	(United Kingdom) Gala Baths, West Bromwich, England	
2	Loss	1-1	(United Kingdom) Russel Laing	PTS	6	21 Sep 1998	(United Kingdom) Forte Post House Hotel, Glasgow, Scotland	
1	Win	1-0	(United Kingdom) Chris Thomas	TKO	2 (6)	3 Apr 1998	(United Kingdom) Ebbw Vale Leisure Centre, Ebbw Vale, Wales	

== Titles ==
Information from the British Boxing Board of Control.

Preceded by Inaugural Title	British Super Flyweight Champion; WPTS 12 vs Jamie McDonnell; 8 December 2007 – 28 March 2008	Succeeded by Andy Bell
Preceded by Jason Booth (vacated); Paul Edwards	British Flyweight Champion; 23 January 2009 – 23 October 2009; 11 June 2011 - 13 October 2012	Succeeded by Kevin Satchell
Preceded by Lee Haskins; Chris Edwards (stripped)	Commonwealth Flyweight Champion; 23 January 2009 – 23 October 2009; 19 February 2010 - 19 May 2012	Succeeded by Kevin Satchell
