= Conner Kelsall =

English boxer (born 1999)

Personal information
- Nickname: King
- Born: 6 February 1999 (age 27) Rotherham, Yorkshire, England
- Height: 5 ft 6 in (168 cm)
- Weight: Flyweight

Boxing career
- Stance: Orthodox

Boxing record
- Total fights: 14
- Wins: 14
- Win by KO: 1

Conner Kelsall (born 6 February 1999) is an English professional boxer He has held the European flyweight title since May 2026. Kelsall is also a former Commonwealth and English flyweight champion.

== Career ==
Kelsall began boxing aged seven and went on to win five national titles at amateur level, before turning professional in 2019.

Having compiled a record of seven wins from seven fights, he claimed his first professional title by defeating Benn Norman for the vacant English flyweight championship via unanimous decision at the Magna Centre in Rotherham on 11 December 2022.

Kelsall successfully defended his title against Paul Roberts on 1 July 2023, with another unanimous decision win at the Metrodome in Barnsley.

In his 12th pro-fight, he took on the previously unbeaten Conor Quinn at the SSE Arena in Belfast on 28 June 2024, for the vacant Commonwealth flyweight title, winning the bout by majority decision with two of the ringside judges scoring the contest 116-112 and 115–114 respectively in his favour while the third had it a 114–114 draw.

Kelsall faced Joel Santos for the vacant European flyweight title at the Magna Centre in Rotherham on 2 May 2026. He won via majority decision with the ringside judges' scorecards reading 116-112, 115–113 and 114–114.

== Professional boxing record ==
14 fights	14 wins	0 losses
By knockout	1	0
By decision	13	0

No.	Result	Record	Opponent	Type	Round, time	Date	Location	Notes
14	Win	14–0	Joel Santos	MD	12	2 May 2026	Magna Centre, Rotherham, England	Won the vacant European flyweight title
13	Win	13–0	Steven Maguire	PTS	6	5 Jul 2025	Magna Centre, Rotherham, England	
12	Win	12–0	Conor Quinn	MD	12	28 Jun 2024	SSE Arena, Belfast, Northern Ireland	Won the vacant Commonwealth flyweight title
11	Win	11–0	Luke Fash	PTS	4	12 Apr 2024	Magna Centre, Rotherham, England	
10	Win	10–0	Nabil Ahmed	PTS	4	10 Feb 2024	Metrodome, Barnsley, England	
9	Win	9–0	Paul Roberts	UD	10	1 Jul 2023	Metrodome, Barnsley, England	Retained the English flyweight title
8	Win	8–0	Benn Norman	UD	10	11 Dec 2022	Magna Centre, Rotherham, England	For the vacant English flyweight title
7	Win	7–0	Stephen Jackson	PTS	4	22 Oct 2022	Legacy Centre, Doncaster, England	
6	Win	6–0	Mikey Young	PTS	4	3 Sep 2022	Doncaster Dome, Doncaster, England	
5	Win	5–0	Mohammed Al Warith	RTD	1 (4), 3:00	27 May 2022	Magna Centre, Rotherham, England	
4	Win	4–0	Reiss Taylor	PTS	4	18 Mar 2022	Magna Centre, Rotherham, England	
3	Win	3–0	Jack Dwyer	PTS	4	20 Nov 2021	Magna Centre, Rotherham, England	
2	Win	2–0	Stephen Jackson	PTS	4	17 Sep 2021	Magna Centre, Rotherham, England	
1	Win	1–0	Jake Pollard	PTS	4	22 Feb 2020	Doncaster Dome, Doncaster, England	
