= Craig Lyon =

English boxer

Personal information
- Nationality: English (England)
- Born: 3 February 1982 (age 44) St Helens, United Kingdom
- Weight: Bantamweight

Boxing career
- Stance: Orthodox

Boxing record
- Total fights: 14
- Wins: 12
- Win by KO: 3
- Losses: 1
- Draws: 1
- No contests: 0

Craig Lyon (born is 3 February 1982 in St Helens) is an English bantamweight boxer.

== Amateur career ==
Lyon, the son of former top amateur John, won the 2001 and 2003 Amateur Boxing Association British light-flyweight title, when boxing out of the Wigan ABC.

== Professional career ==
After turning pro in 2008, Lyon has had 14 fights and won the English bantamweight title by stopping Ross Burkinshaw in five rounds in Bolton in October 2010.

He suffered his first defeat when losing to Ryan Farrag in the quarter finals of the super-flyweight Prizefighter tournament in October 2011.
