= Ivan Morales Jr. =

Brazilian film editor and film maker (born 1981)

- Born: January 7, 1981 (age 45); Pindamonhangaba, Brazil
- Occupations: Film editor and Film maker
- Years active: 2004—present

Ivan Morales Jr. (born January 7, 1981) is a Brazilian film editor and film maker.

== Life and work ==
Ivan Morales Jr. studied Audiovisual Media in his homeland Brazil. After this study, he made his diploma as editor at the International School of Film and Television Escuela Internacional de Cine y Televisión in Cuba. By the Berlinale Talent Campus 2005 Ivan Morales Jr. came to Germany and received a grant as editor at the Academy of Media Arts Cologne. Since that time he works as a freelance editor for documentary, feature film and TV productions. Furthermore, he realized own and manifold awarded short films.

Ivan Morales Jr. lives in Cologne, Germany.

== Selected filmography ==
- 2004: Los peces también mueren sin anzuelo (Short film), (Film director, Screenplay writer and editor)
- 2007: Antonio Can (Antonio Pode), (Short film) (Film director, Screenplay writer and editor)
- 2008: My Home (Documentary), (Editor)
- 2008: A Arquitetura do Corpo (Documentary), (Screenplay writer and editor)
- 2009: In Dir muss brennen (Documentary), (Editor)
- 2010: Auf der Walz (Documentary), (Editor)
- 2012: More Jesus (Documentary), (Editor)
- 2013: Breath (Sopro), (Documentary), (Editor)
- 2013: Atemwege: Abseits des Selbstverständlichen (Documentary), (Editor)
- 2015: MAMMON - Per Anhalter durch das Geldsystem (Documentary), (Editor)
- 2017: Algo Mío - Argentina's Stolen Children (Documentary), (Editor)
- 2017: The part of the world that belongs to me (Documentary), (Screenplay writer und Editor)
- 2018: Dia de Reis (TV Movie), (Editor)
- 2019: Faith and Fury (Documentary), (Screenplay writer und Editor)
- 2020: Lost in Face (Documentary), (Screenplay writer und Editor)

== Awards ==
- 2005: Award at the Berlinale Talent Campus for his shortfilm Los peces también mueren sin anzuelo
- 2008: Award in the category Best film for Antonio Can at the Cine Ceará - Festival Nacional de Cinema e Video in Brazilian Fortaleza
- 2008: Award in the category Best edit for A Arquitetura do Corpo at the Festival de Brasília do Cinema Brasileiro
