= Iván Morales (boxer) =

Mexican boxer (born 1991)

Personal information
- Nickname: Terrible II Niño Maravilla
- Born: José Iván Morales Elvira; 9 October 1991 (age 34) Tijuana, Baja California, Mexico
- Height: 1.71 m (5 ft 7 in)
- Weight: Super bantamweight Bantamweight

Boxing career
- Reach: 178 cm (70 in)
- Stance: Southpaw

Boxing record
- Total fights: 38
- Wins: 34
- Win by KO: 20
- Losses: 4
- Draws: 0
- No contests: 0

José Iván Morales Elvira (born 9 October 1991) is a Mexican professional boxer who challenged for the IBF bantamweight title in 2016. He is the younger brother of both Diego Morales and of Erik Morales.

== Professional career ==
In December 2009, Iván knocked out Cristian Zavala to win his pro debut in Rosarito, Baja California, Mexico.

== See also ==
- Notable boxing families
