= European Boxing Union =

Pan-European governing body

- Sport: Boxing
- Membership: 41
- Abbreviation: EBU
- Founded: 1911
- Affiliation: World Boxing Council
- Affiliation date: 1963

Official website
- boxebu.com

The European Boxing Union (EBU), formerly known as the International Boxing Union (IBU), is a pan-European governing body that sanctions championship bouts in professional boxing. The EBU governs the EBU European Championship, in addition to their EBU EU Championship for competitors from within the European Union and the EBU EE Championship for those outside the European Union. It is a federation affiliated with the World Boxing Council (WBC).

During most of the 20th century and, particularly, during start of the century, the EBU recognized many world title fights as the IBU. It competed against the American-based National Boxing Association (NBA), which staged the more high profile world title fights.

== History ==
=== International Boxing Union (1911–1942) ===
The International Boxing Union (IBU) was created June 1911 in Paris, France. It was the first attempt to create a unified international governing body for professional boxing. Signators of the Protocol for the IBU were the President of Fédération Française de Boxe et de Lutte for France, the President of Fédération Belge de Boxe for Belgium, and the President of Société Française de Propagation de la Boxe Anglaise who acted on behalf of some American boxing authorities. Switzerland joined the IBU in November 1913. Denmark, the Netherlands, Italy, Sweden, Norway, Brazil, Argentine, Canada, Australia and the United Kingdom also joined. By 1922, the UK had withdrawn support, and the US was never fully committed.

The IBU suspended operations with the outbreak of World War I, but resumed action on February 5, 1920.

=== Associazione Pugilistica Professionistica Europea (1942–1944) ===
Headquartered in Paris, the IBU was in the hands of the Nazis and Italian Fascists during the Nazi occupation of France during World War II. On 5 June 1942, the Associazione Pugilistica Professionistica Europea (APPE) was formally established, replacing the IBU. Vittorio Mussolini, eldest son of Italian dictator Benito Mussolini, was declared the APPE's first President. The first official meeting of the APPE's steering committee was held June 7, who recognized the following European champions: Enrico Urbinati (fly), Gino Bondavalli (bantam and feather), Ascenzo Botta (light), vacant - it was announced to Marcel Cerdan that he had lost his title (welter), Jupp Besselmann (middle), Luigi Musina (light-heavy), and Max Schmeling (heavy).

The lira was adopted as the official currency for bout and congress fees. The APPE also changed the division weights by adopting the kilogram: 51 kilos (fly), 54 (bantam), 58 (feather), 62 (light), 67 (junior middle—abolishing the term "welter"), 73 (middle), 80 (light-heavy), and 80-plus (heavy). Ultimately, all European bouts held under the APPE's aegis were matched at these weights until December 1944.

It was planned that after the Axis won World War II, the APPE would be transformed into the APPI (Associazione Pugilistica Professionistica Internazionale) and be headquartered in Rome. But by December 1, 1944, the IBU/APPE was extinct.

=== European Boxing Union (1946–present) ===
The British Boxing Board of Control and the newly formed French FFB tried to constitute a new European body—the European Boxing Association (EBA)—but other countries protested because the two veteran countries would have reintroduced the principle that the European Champion would be decided by a bout between British and French champions. Instead, in 1946, the European Boxing Union (EBU) was established.

In 1963, the president of Mexico, Adolfo López Mateos, invited the EBU, the British Boxing Board of Control, the New York State Athletic Commission, and the national sanctioning organizations of nine other countries to form the World Boxing Council. The EBU's personnel ultimately decided to recognize regional title bouts as a federation under the WBC.

During the 1990s, the EBU began to recognize women's boxing regional championship bouts, and welcomed former Yugoslavian country Bosnia and Herzegovina as a member country.

Currently, winning an EBU title is considered important, but not necessary, by many European boxers in order to go on and fight for a world title of the four most widely recognized world championship boxing organizations, the WBA, WBC, IBF, and WBO. Following the formation of the European Economic Union, the EBU issued subtitles for the Union countries (EBU-EU title) and "External" countries (EBU-EE title), below their main EBU title which would cover all 50 countries on the continent and 3/4 billion residents.

In light of the 2022 Russian invasion of Ukraine, the EBU announced that it would not certify any championship contests involving boxers from Russia and Belarus.

== Rules ==
The EBU follows certain rules, but most rules in EBU bouts obey the rules set by the independent boxing commission of the country where an EBU fight will be held at. Some of the EBU rules are that a fighter must not be younger than 20 years of age when fighting for an EBU championship, and that hotel accommodation for boxers, referees and European Boxing Union officials visiting a country for an EBU fight must be paid by the fight's promoter. The EBU does, however, pay for the air or train tickets of referees and officials that travel away from home for an EBU fight. Other rules are also imposed on EBU recognized events, but not many of the EBU rules interfere with the fighting rules to be followed during the fight itself.

The EBU recognizes world titles sanctioned by the WBA, WBC, IBF, WBO and IBO. A boxer holding a world title is rendered ineligible for EBU, including EU and EE, rankings.

A male boxer must have competed in at least eight bouts to be eligible for rankings. For female boxers, it is four bouts. At least five of a boxer's last 10 bouts must have taken place in Europe and sanctioned by an EBU affiliate association, two of which in the last 24 months, to be eligible for rankings.

A boxer challenging for a European title from another sanctioning body is disqualified from rankings for nine months. A boxer holding such a title will only be eligible for rankings after 12 months from the time of having relinquished it.

=== EBU members ===
- Albania
- Austria
- Belarus
- Belgium
- Bosnia and Herzegovina
- Bulgaria
- Croatia
- Czechia
- Denmark
- Estonia
- Finland
- France
- Georgia
- Germany
- Great Britain
- Greece
- Hungary
- Italy
- Kazakhstan
- Kosovo
- Latvia
- Lithuania
- North Macedonia
- Malta ^{provisional member}
- Moldova
- Monaco
- Montenegro
- Netherlands
- Norway
- Poland
- Republic of Ireland
- Republic of Srpska^{provisional member}
- Romania
- Russia
- Serbia
- Slovakia
- Spain
- Sweden
- Switzerland
- Turkey
- Ukraine

== Current champions ==
=== Male ===
Weight class:	Champion:	Reign began:
Heavyweight	(Kosovo) Labinot Xhoxhaj	23 November 2024
Cruiserweight	(United Kingdom) Viddal Riley	4 April 2026
Light-heavyweight	(Italy) Luca D'Ortenzi	22 May 2026
Super-middleweight	(Spain) Jose Luis Navarro Jr.	3 October 2026
Middleweight	(United Kingdom) George Liddard	22 August 2026
Super-welterweight	(France) Milan Prat	22 November 2025
Welterweight	(Spain) Aaron Alhambra	3 October 2026
Super-lightweight	(Spain) Jon Fernandez	22 November 2025
Lightweight	(Spain) Jokin Garcia	26 September 2026
Super-featherweight	(United Kingdom) Josh Padley	31 January 2026
Featherweight	(United Kingdom) Liam Davies	28 March 2026
Super-bantamweight	(Italy) Francesco De Rosa	9 October 2026
Bantamweight	(Italy) Cristian Zara	9 May 2025
Flyweight	(United Kingdom) Conner Kelsall	2 May 2026

=== Female ===
Weight class:	Champion:	Reign began:
Super-middleweight	vacant	
Middleweight	vacant	
Super-welterweight	vacant	
Welterweight	vacant	
Super-lightweight	vacant	
Lightweight	vacant	
Super-featherweight	(Italy) Martina Righi	30 May 2026
Featherweight	vacant	
Super-bantamweight	(France) Narymane Benloucif	8 February 2026
Bantamweight	(Italy) Gloria Peritore	8 May 2026
Super-flyweight	(Spain) Fara El Bousairi	18 April 2026
Flyweight	vacant	
Light-flyweight	(Spain) Tatiana Perez	28 November 2025
Strawweight	(Spain) Maria Luz Peral	11 April 2026

== Other regional WBC federations ==
- Oriental and Pacific Boxing Federation (OPBF)
- Asian Boxing Council (ABCO)
- African Boxing Union (ABU)
- Caribbean Boxing Federation (CABOFE)
- Central American Boxing Federation (FECARBOX)
- CIS and Slovenian Boxing Bureau (CISBB)
- North American Boxing Federation (NABF)
- South American Boxing Federation (FESUBOX)

== See also ==
- List of boxing organisations
- List of European Boxing Union champions
- List of European Boxing Union female champions
