= Martin Ward (boxer, born 1988) =

English boxer

Personal information
- Nationality: British
- Born: 11 March 1988 (age 38) West Rainton, England
- Weight: Bantamweight; Super bantamweight; Super featherweight

Boxing career
- Stance: Southpaw

Boxing record
- Total fights: 32
- Wins: 27
- Win by KO: 5
- Losses: 4
- Draws: 1

Martin Ward (born 11 March 1988) is a British professional boxer.

== Boxing career ==
=== Amateur record ===
Ward won the 2010 Amateur Boxing Association British featherweight title, when boxing out of the Repton ABC.

=== Professional record ===
He challenged for the IBF bantamweight title in 2014. At regional level, he held the Commonwealth bantamweight title in 2013, challenged for the British bantamweight title in 2013 and the super bantamweight title in 2015.

32 fights	27 wins	4 losses
By knockout	5	3
By decision	22	1
Draws	1	

No.	Result	Record	Opponent	Type	Round, time	Date	Location	Notes
32	Win	27–4–1	(Nicaragua) Johnson Tellez	PTS	6	16 Nov 2018	(United Kingdom) Lancastrian Suite, Dunston, England	
31	Win	26–4–1	(Nicaragua) Jose Aguilar	PTS	6	26 May 2018	(United Kingdom) Dolphin Centre, Darlington, England	
30	Loss	25–4–1	(Spain) Abigail Medina	TKO	2 (12)	30 Sep 2017	(United Kingdom) Borough Hall, Hartlepool, England	For EBU European super bantamweight title
29	Win	25–3–1	(Latvia) Dimitrijs Gutmans	PTS	6	4 Mar 2017	(United Kingdom) Rainton Meadows Arena, Houghton-le-Spring, England	
28	Win	24–3–1	(Nicaragua) Reynaldo Cajina	PTS	6	10 Jul 2016	(United Kingdom) Stadium of Light, Sunderland, England	
27	Win	23–3–1	(Lithuania) Simas Volosinas	PTS	4	20 Feb 2016	(United Kingdom) Hilton Manchester Deansgate, Manchester, England	
26	Loss	22–3–1	(United Kingdom) Jazza Dickens	SD	4	20 Nov 2015	(United Kingdom) Rainton Meadows Arena, Houghton-le-Spring, England	For British super bantamweight title
25	Win	22–2–1	(Nicaragua) Elvis Guillen	TKO	3 (4)	19 Sep 2015	(United Kingdom) Lancastrian Suite, Dunston, England	
24	Win	21–2–1	(Lithuania) Simas Volosinas	PTS	6	8 May 2015	(United Kingdom) Borough Hall, Hartlepool, England	
23	Win	20–2–1	(Georgia (country)) Kakha Avetisiani	PTS	6	8 Mar 2015	(United Kingdom) Rainton Meadows Arena, Houghton-le-Spring, England	
22	Win	19–2–1	(Ghana) Isaac Owusu	PTS	6	30 Nov 2014	(United Kingdom) Rainton Meadows Arena, Houghton-le-Spring, England	
21	Draw	18–2–1	(United Kingdom) Stuart Hall	SD	12	29 Mar 2014	(United Kingdom) Metro Radio Arena, Newcastle, England	For IBF bantamweight title
20	Win	18–2	(Ghana) Laryea Gabriel Odoi	UD	12	7 Dec 2013	(United Kingdom) Centre for Sport, Newcastle, England	Won vacant Commonwealth bantamweight title
19	Win	17–2	(Hungary) Adrian Fuzesi	PTS	6	7 Jul 2013	(United Kingdom) Stadium of Light, Sunderland, England	
18	Loss	16–2	(United Kingdom) Lee Haskins	TKO	5 (12)	27 Apr 2013	(United Kingdom) City Academy Sports Centre, Bristol, England	For vacant British bantamweight title
17	Win	16–1	(United Kingdom) Jason Booth	UD	10	30 Sep 2012	(United Kingdom) Borough Hall, Hartlepool, England	Won vacant English bantamweight title
16	Win	15–1	(Georgia (country)) Giorgi Gachechiladze	TKO	8 (10)	20 May 2012	(United Kingdom) Rainton Meadows Arena, Houghton-le-Spring, England	
15	Win	14–1	(Bulgaria) Hyusein Hyuseinov	RTD	5 (8)	10 Mar 2012	(United Kingdom) Lancastrian Suite, Dunston, England	
14	Win	13–1	(United Kingdom) Andy Roberts	KO	2 (4)	10 Dec 2011	(United Kingdom) Peterlee Leisure Centre, Peterloo, England	
13	Win	12–1	(South Africa) Michael Ramabeletsa	PTS	6	18 Sep 2011	(United Kingdom) Rainton Meadows Arena, Houghton-le-Spring, England	
12	Win	11–1	(United Kingdom) Ian Napa	PTS	10	3 Jul 2011	(United Kingdom) Stadium of Light, Sunderland, England	
11	Win	10–1	(United Kingdom) Shaun Doherty	PTS	6	9 Apr 2011	(United Kingdom) Rainton Meadows Arena, Houghton-le-Spring, England	
10	Win	9–1	(United Kingdom) Delroy Spencer	PTS	4	12 Dec 2010	(United Kingdom) Rainton Meadows Arena, Houghton-le-Spring, England	
9	Loss	8–1	(United Kingdom) Mickey Coveney	TKO	2 (6)	11 Sep 2010	(United Kingdom) Rainton Meadows Leisure Centre, Houghton-le-Spring, England	
8	Win	8–0	(United Kingdom) Jason Nesbitt	PTS	4	23 Jul 2010	(United Kingdom) Rainton Meadows Leisure Centre, Houghton-le-Spring, England	
7	Win	7–0	(United Kingdom) Dai Davies	PTS	4	4 Jun 2010	(United Kingdom) Peterlee Leisure Centre, Peterlee, England	
6	Win	6–0	(United Kingdom) Mo Khaled	PTS	4	7 May 2010	(United Kingdom) Kingsway Leisure Centre, Widnes, England	
5	Win	5–0	(Hungary) Csaba Toth	TKO	4	12 Feb 2010	(United Kingdom) York Hall, London, England	
4	Win	4–0	(United Kingdom) Delroy Spencer	PTS	4	19 Nov 2009	(United Kingdom) Pullman Lodge Hotel, Sunderland, England	
3	Win	3–0	(Hungary) Ignac Kassai	PTS	4	12 Jun 2009	(United Kingdom) Olympia, Liverpool, England	
2	Win	2–0	(United Kingdom) Sid Razak	PTS	4	1 May 2009	(United Kingdom) Seaton Carew Mayfair Suite, Hartlepool, England	
1	Win	1–0	(United Kingdom) Anthony Hanna	PTS	4	13 Mar 2009	(United Kingdom) Kingsway Leisure Centre, Widnes, England	
