= England Boxing National Amateur Championships Flyweight Champions =

English Boxing competition

England Boxing National Amateur Championships Flyweight Champions (U52.5kg)
- Status: active
- Genre: Boxing
- Frequency: annual
- Inaugurated: 1920
- Organiser: England Boxing

The England Boxing National Amateur Championships Flyweight Championship formerly known as the ABA Championships is the primary English amateur boxing championship. It had previously been contested by all the nations of the United Kingdom.

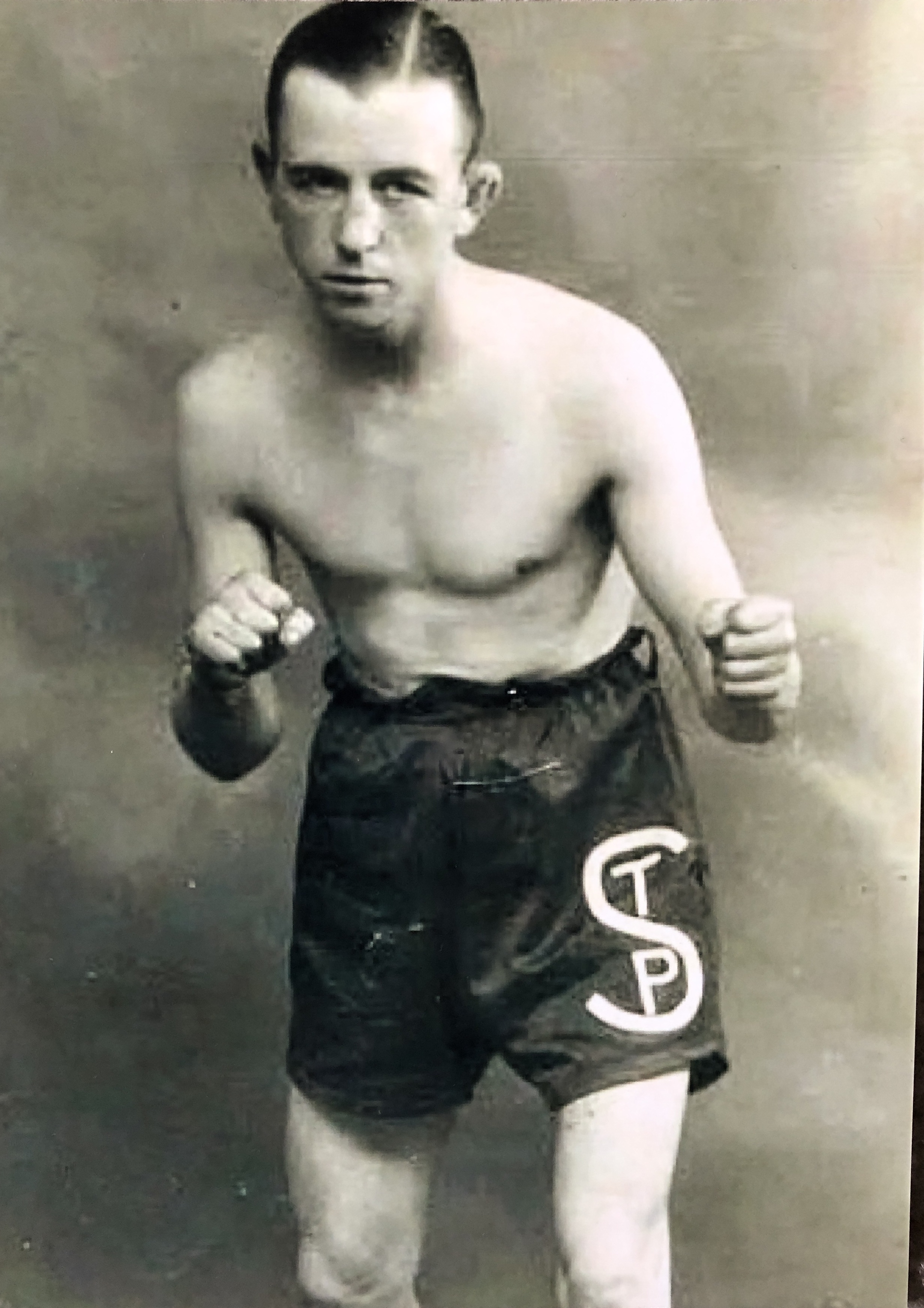
Tommy Pardoe was a five times ABA champion

== History ==
The flyweight division was inaugurated in 1920 and is currently the weight category of under 52.5 Kg. The championships are highly regarded in the boxing world and seen as the most prestigious national amateur championships.

== Past winners ==
Year	Winner	Club
1920	H. Groves	(Caius ABC)
1921	William Cuthbertson	(United Scottish BC)
1922	Les Tarrant	(Armstrong- Siddeley ABC)
1923	Teddy Warwick	(Columbia ABC)
1924	Teddy Warwick	(Columbia ABC)
1925	Teddy Warwick	(Columbia ABC)
1926	Johnny Hill	(Leith Victoria BC)
1927	Jim Rolland	(Leith Victoria BC)
1928	Cuthbert Taylor	(Cardiff Gabalfa AC)
1929	Tommy Pardoe	(Metropolitan ABC)
1930	Tommy Pardoe	(Metropolitan ABC)
1931	Tommy Pardoe	(Metropolitan ABC)
1932	Tommy Pardoe	(Metropolitan ABC)
1933	Tommy Pardoe	(Metropolitan ABC)
1934	Pat Palmer	(Battersea & Shexgar ABC)
1935	Gaston Fayaud	(France)
1936	Gaston Fayaud	(France)
1937	Pat O'Donoghue	(Watneys ABC)
1938	Alf Russell	(Unattached)
1939	David McKay	(South Africa)
1940-42	Not held	
1943	Richard O'Sullivan	(Fitzroy Lodge and Lynn ABC)
1944	Jimmy Clinton	(Dalmarnock BC)
1945	Jackie Bryce	(Anderston BC)
1946	Richard 'Skeets' Gallacher	(John Brown's Welfare ABC)
1947	Jimmy Clinton	(Dalmarnock BC)
1948	Henry Carpenter	(Bradfield ABC)
1949	Hugh Riley	(Gilmerton ABC)
1950	Albert Jones	(Kynoch ABC)
1951	Gerald John	(Slough Centre BC)
1952	Dai Dower	(Roath Youth BC)
1953	Dick Currie	(Dalmarnock BC)
1954	Dick Currie	(Dalmarnock BC)
1955	Derek Lloyd	(Army)
1956	Terry Spinks	(West Ham ABC)
1957	Ron Davies	(Army)
1958	Jackie Brown	(Leith Victoria BC)
1959	Mick Gushlow	(Royal Air Force)
1960	Danny Lee	(Woodhall ABC)
1961	Walter McGowan	(Royal Albert ABC)
1962	Mike Pye	(Harris Lebus ABC)
1963	Monty Laud	(St. Ives ABC)
1964	John McCluskey	(Larkhall ABC)
1965	John McCluskey	(Larkhall ABC)
1966	Paddy Maguire	(Vauxhall Motors ABC)
1967	Steve Curtis	(Roath Youth ABC)
1968	Gnr. Johnny McGonigle	(Army)
1969	Dave Needham	(Nottingham School of Boxing ABC)
1970	Dave Needham	(Nottingham School of Boxing ABC)
1971	Peter Wakefield	(St. Patrick ABC)
1972	Maurice O'Sullivan	(Roath Youth ABC)
1973	Roy Hilton	(Repton ABC)
1974	Maurice O'Sullivan	(Roath Youth ABC)
1975	Charlie Magri	(Arbour Youth ABC)
1976	Charlie Magri	(Arbour Youth ABC)
1977	Charlie Magri	(Arbour Youth ABC)
1978	Gary Nickels	(Repton ABC)
1979	Ray Gilbody	(St. Helens Star ABC)
1980	Keith Wallace	(St. Helens Star ABC)
1981	Keith Wallace	(St. Helens Star ABC)
1982	Joe Kelly	(Holyrood ABC)
1983	Stephen Nolan	(Fisher ABC)
1984	Pat Clinton	(Croy Miners ABC)
1985	Pat Clinton	(Croy Miners ABC)
1986	John Lyon	(Greenall St. Helens ABC)
1987	John Lyon	(Greenall St. Helens ABC)
1988	John Lyon	(Greenall St. Helens ABC)
1989	John Lyon	(Greenall St. Helens ABC)
1990	Johnny Armour	(St. Marys ABC)
1991	Paul Ingle	(Scarborough ABC)
1992	Keith Knox	(Bonnybrigg ABC)
1993	Paul Ingle	(Scarborough ABC)
1994	Danny Costello	(Hollington ABC)
1995	Danny Costello	(Hollington ABC)
1996	Danny Costello	(Hollington ABC)
1997	Michael Hunter	(Hartlepool Boys Welfare ABC)
1998	James Hegney	(Castle Vale ABC)
1999	Dale Robinson	(Hard and Fast ABC)
2000	Dale Robinson	(Hard and Fast ABC)
2001	Matthew Marsh	(West Ham ABC)
2002	Duncan Barriball	(Army)
2003	Don Broadhurst	(Aston ABC)
2004	Stuart Langley	(Hollington ABC)
2005	Darran Langley	(Hollington ABC)
2006	Paul Edwards	(Salisbury ABC)
2007	Michael Walsh	(Norwich Lads)
2008	Adam Whitfield	(Army BA)
2009	Gamal Yafai	(Birmingham City Police)
2010	Paul Butler	(Vauxhall Motors)
2011	Jason Cunningham	(St Paul's)
2012	Joe McCully	(Bexley ABC)
2013	Jack Bateson	(Burmantofts ABC)
2014	Charlie Edwards	(Repton ABC)
2015	Muhammad Ali	(Bury)
2016	Will Cawley	(Oldham)
2017	Niall Farrell	(Kingstanding 2nd City)
2018	Hamza Mahmood	(Hoddesdon)
2019	Hamza Mahmood	(Hoddesdon)
2020	cancelled due to COVID 19.	
2021	Eryk Ciuerja	(Fenland Sparta)
2022	Hamza Uddin	(Empire)
2023	Hamza Uddin	(Fearless)
2024	Lucas Dube	(No Limits)
2025	Reece Readshaw	(Phil Thomas SOB)
2026	Reece Readshaw	(Phil Thomas SOB)
