= List of British bantamweight boxing champions =

The following is a table showing the boxers who have won the British bantamweight title. The title has been sanctioned by the National Sporting Club since 1909, and later by its replacement British Boxing Board of Control (BBBoC) since 1929.

A champion will often voluntarily relinquish the title in order to fight for a higher-ranked championship, such as the world or European. Where the date on which a champion relinquished the title is unclear, the date of the last BBBoC sanctioned fight is shown.

^{r}–Champion relinquished title.

^{s}–Champion stripped of title.

Name	Duration of reign	Defences
Digger Stanley	17 October 1910 — 2 June 1913	3
Bill Beynon	2 June 1913 — 27 October 1913	1
Digger Stanley	27 October 1913 — 20 April 1914	1
Curley Walker	20 April 1914^{r 1915}	0
Joe Fox	22 November 1915 — 25 June 1917^{r 1918}	2
Tommy Noble	25 November 1918 — 30 June 1919	1
Walter Ross	30 June 1919^{r 1919}	0
Jim Higgins	23 February 1920 — 26 June 1922	3
Tommy Harrison	26 June 1922 — 26 February 1923	1
Harry Lake	26 February 1923 — 26 November 1923	1
Johnny Brown	26 November 1923 — 19 October 1925^{r 1927}	2
Alf Pattenden	4 June 1928 — 16 May 1929	2
Teddy Baldock	16 May 1929^{rv1931}	0
Dick Corbett	21 December 1931 — 10 October 1932	1
Johnny King	10 October 1932 — 12 February 1934	1
Dick Corbett	12 February 1934 — 20 August 1934^{r 1934}	2
Johnny King	20 August 1934 — 10 February 1947	3
Jackie Paterson	10 February 1947 — 24 March 1949	2
Stan Rowan	24 March 1949 — 28 November 1949^{rel}	0
Danny O'Sullivan	13 December 1949 – 9 May 1951	1
Peter Keenan	9 May 1951 – 3 October 1953	3
John Kelly	3 October 1953 – 21 September 1954	1
Peter Keenan	21 September 1954 – 10 January 1959	4
Freddie Gilroy	10 January 1959 – 20 October 1962^{r 1962}	3
Johnny Caldwell	5 March 1962 – 22 March 1965	1
Alan Rudkin	22 March 1965 – 6 September 1966	1
Walter McGowan	6 September 1966 – 13 May 1968	1
Alan Rudkin	13 May 1968 – 25 January 1972^{r 1972}	3
Johnny Clark	20 February 1973^{r}	0
Dave Needham	10 December 1974 – 20 October 1975	1
Paddy Maguire	20 October 1975 – 29 November 1977	1
Johnny Owen	29 November 1977 – 28 June 1980 (died 1980)	3
John Feeney	22 September 1981 – 25 January 1983	1
Hugh Russell	25 January 1983 – 2 March 1983	1
Davy Larmour	2 March 1983 – 16 November 1983	1
John Feeney	16 November 1983 – 13 June 1985	1
Ray Gilbody	13 June 1985 – 19 February 1987	2
Billy Hardy	19 February 1987 – 29 November 1990^{r 1991}	4
Joe Kelly	27 January 1992 – 1 June 1992	1
Drew Docherty	1 June 1992 – 19 October 1997^{s}	3
Paul Lloyd	25 October 1997 – 26 September 1998^{r 1999}	1
Noel Wilders	30 October 1999 – 18 January 2000^{r 2000}	1
Ady Lewis	1 April 2000 – 9 September 2000	1
Tommy Waite	9 September 2000 – 9 October 2000	1
Nicky Booth	9 October 2000 – 28 April 2003^{r}	4
Martin Power	20 May 2003 – 30 May 2006^{r 2007}	2
Ian Napa	6 July 2007 – 2 May 2008^{r}	3
Gary Davies	3 April 2009 – 23 October 2009	1
Ian Napa	23 October 2009 – 22 January 2010	1
Jamie McDonnell	22 January 2010^{r}	0
Stuart Hall	4 June 2010 – 3 September 2011	4
Jamie McDonnell	3 September 2011^{r}	0
Lee Haskins	27 April 2013 – 8 November 2013^{r}	1
Ryan Burnett	21 November 2015 – 15 October 2016^{r}	1
Josh Wale	1 July 2017 – 2 February 2018^{r}	2
Ukashir Farooq	27 September 2018 – 16 November 2019	3
Lee McGregor	16 November 2019^{r}	0
Sean McGoldrick	10 February 2023^{r}	0
Ashley Lane	22 March 2024 - 20 July 2024	0
Andrew Cain	20 July 2024	1

== See also ==
- List of British heavyweight boxing champions
- List of British cruiserweight boxing champions
- List of British light-heavyweight boxing champions
- List of British super-middleweight boxing champions
- List of British middleweight boxing champions
- List of British light-middleweight boxing champions
- List of British welterweight boxing champions
- List of British light-welterweight boxing champions
- List of British lightweight boxing champions
- List of British super-featherweight boxing champions
- List of British featherweight boxing champions
- List of British super-bantamweight boxing champions
- List of British super-flyweight boxing champions
- List of British flyweight boxing champions
- List of British world boxing champions

== Sources ==
- boxrec
- Maurice Golesworthy, Encyclopaedia of Boxing (Eighth Edition) (1988), Robert Hale Limited, ISBN 0-7090-3323-0
