= Osumana Akaba =

Ghanaian boxer

Personal information
- Nationality: (Ghana) Ghanaian
- Born: Osumana Akaba; 7 August 1980 (age 46) Accra, Ghana
- Weight: Super Featherweight

Boxing career
- Stance: Southpaw

Boxing record
- Total fights: 16
- Wins: 11
- Win by KO: 1
- Losses: 5
- Draws: 0

Osumana Akaba (born August 7, 1980) is a Ghanaian professional boxer who has challenged for the Commonwealth title at two different weights.

== Early professional career ==
Akaba made his professional debut in January 2001 with a win over Sarouna Mamoudou in Kaneshie, Ghana. His first defeat came two fights later when he lost to Abdul Malik Jabir for the Ghanaian super bantamweight title once again in Kaneshie. Akaba avenged his first defeat five fights and five wins later when he beat Jabir for the vacant WBC International Featherweight title, this time in Ghana's capital city Accra. Akaba would lose the belt in his first defence over 12 rounds to Jeffrey Mathebula in South Africa. It was the first time Akaba had fought outside his native country.

== Commonwealth Challenges ==
With a record of 10 wins and 3 defeats Akaba travelled to the UK in May 2008 and took on England's Paul Truscott for the Commonwealth featherweight title in Middlesbrough. Akaba was considered a step up in class for Truscott at the time and ended with a good win for the Englishman over 12 rounds. Akaba bounced back from the defeat when he beat the South African fighter Tshifhiwa Munyai in July 2008 over 8 rounds in Dagenham. Munyai was a highly touted fighter in the UK and had scored some good wins over Martin Power (twice) and Lee Haskins.

In September 2008 Kevin Mitchell gave up his Commonwealth super featherweight title and Akaba was drafted in by Frank Warren's Sports Network to contest the vacant title against house fighter Ricky Burns at London's York Hall. The fight ended with a win for Burns over 12 rounds.
