= Rocky Dean =

British boxer (born 1978)

Personal information
- Nationality: British
- Born: Rocky Dean; 17 June 1978 (age 48) Thetford
- Weight: Super Bantamweight

Boxing career
- Stance: Orthodox

Boxing record
- Total fights: 27
- Wins: 14
- Win by KO: 4
- Losses: 11
- Draws: 2
- No contests: 0

Rocky Dean (born 17 June 1978) is a British former professional boxer from Thetford in Norfolk, England. He is a former Southern Area champion at Featherweight and has twice competed for the full British title at Super Bantamweight.

== Early Professional Career ==
Dean made his professional debut on 14 October 1999 defeating Lenny Hodgkins at the Royal National Hotel in London. He won his next three contests before losing to journeyman Chris Jickells on 10 November 2000. Dean did not fight at all in 2001, making a return to the ring a year later and winning all three of his fights in 2002. In 2003 Dean failed to win any of his six contests, drawing twice and losing four times in that year. During the year Dean had boxed future Commonwealth champion Isaac Ward twice (one draw, 1 loss) and also met future British champions Michael Hunter and Martin Power in the ring, losing to them both. Dean boxed twice in 2004 winning on both occasions.

== Title challenges ==
On 5 March 2005 Dean fought for the Southern Area Featherweight title defeating Mickey Coveney over 10 rounds at the Goresbrook Leisure Centre in Dagenham. The win set up a shot at the vacant English title in his next fight only for Dean to lose for the sixth time in his career to Andy Morris, a man who would go on to claim the full British belt. On 18 September 2005 Dean fought and defeated novice boxer Gary Davies with a fourth round stoppage win. Davis became the fourth boxer Dean had fought that would go on to become a full British champion. Dean finished the year by traveling to the Ukraine to fight Andrey Isaev only to lose in the 12th round of his challenge for the WBF International title.

== Matthew Marsh trilogy ==
Dean made the first defence of his Southern Area Featherweight title on 9 December 2006 against rising star Matthew Marsh eventually losing the belt on a points decision over 10 rounds. On 14 July 2007 the two met again this time for the Super Bantamweight version of the belt, Marsh again edging a points win over 10 to hold both titles at the same time. Dean fought twice more scoring two wins before meeting Marsh for the third time. Marsh, by now the full British champion at Super Bantamweight defeated Dean for the third time on 21 November 2008 in what was his first defence of the British title at the York Hall in London.

== Further challenges ==
Despite the loss to Marsh for the British title, Dean got a chance to challenge once again for the belt in his very next fight against the new champion Jason Booth. The two met on 30 June 2009 again at the York Hall only for Booth, making his first defence of the title, to run out a winner over the 12 round distance.
