= Martin Ward =

Martin Ward may refer to:

- Martin Ward (unionist) (1918–1982), American labor union leader
- Martin Ward (boxer, born 1988), English bantam and featherweight boxer
- Martin Joseph Ward (born 1991), English super featherweight boxer
- Martin Ward (American football) (born 1989), Marshall University running back
- Martin de Porres Ward, African-American Catholic missionary priest
- Martin Ward, a character from the film Bon Cop, Bad Cop
