= Jamie McDonnell =

Jamie McDonnell is the name of:

- Jamie McDonnell (boxer), British boxer
- Jamie McDonnell (footballer), Northern Irish footballer
