= Stuart Hall (boxer) =

British former professional boxer (born 1980)

Personal information
- Nickname: Stuey
- Nationality: British
- Born: 24 February 1980 (age 46) Darlington, England
- Height: 5 ft 8 in (1.73 m)
- Weight: Bantamweight

Boxing career
- Reach: 69.5 in (177 cm)
- Stance: Orthodox

Boxing record
- Total fights: 30
- Wins: 21
- Win by KO: 7
- Losses: 7
- Draws: 2

Stuart Hall (born 24 February 1980) is a British former professional boxer who competed from 2008 to 2018. He held the IBF bantamweight world title from 2013 to 2014, and challenged twice for the same title in 2014 and 2016. At regional level, he held the British bantamweight title from 2010 to 2011 and the Commonwealth bantamweight title in 2012.

== Early professional career ==
Hall made his professional boxing debut on 26 April 2008 with a win over Abdul Mghrbel in his home town of Darlington. The win was followed with another victory on 6 October 2008 against undefeated seven fight prospect Dougie Walton this time at the Holiday Inn in Birmingham. The two wins meant an undefeated start to his debut year in the ring.

On 16 January 2009 he recorded his first win of the new year travelling to Middlesbrough to defeat Nick Seager before on 29 March 2009 meeting Stuart McFadyen and only registering a draw at the fight held in Bolton. Three more fights followed the McFadyen result with Hall winning on each occasions against the likes of journeyman Anthony Hanna and Jason Thomas and then notably on 11 November travelling to Brentford to meet former British champion Martin Power and winning in the 8th round. Hall's first fight of 2010 resulted in another points win on 12 February at the York Hall against Hungarian Richard Szebeledi meaning that Hall now boasted an unbeaten record of seven wins against only one draw.

== British champion ==
=== Hall vs. Napa ===
On 4 June 2010 Hall stepped into the ring against the former British and European champion Ian Napa and claimed the title in a shock result following Napa's decision not to come out for the start of the 9th round. The experienced Napa had complained about the heat at the venue in Peterlee and the fact that the making the bantamweight limit had been very hard. In contrast Hall described the result saying "It's unbelievable, a dream come true" as he claimed the title in only his 9th professional fight.

=== Hall vs. Power ===
Hall returned to the ring shortly afterwards for his first defence on 23 July 2010 with a return match against former victim and former champion Martin Power. The fight, this time in Sunderland, once again resulted in victory for Hall with the referee stopping the contest in the 10th round with Hall having been dominant throughout.

=== Hall vs. Davies ===
On 13 November 2010 on the undercard of the Heavyweight world title fight between David Haye and Audley Harrison Hall defended his belt for the second time beating former champion Gary Davies in the 7th round and claimed that there was "more to come".

=== Hall vs. Belt ===
Hall claimed the Lonsdale Belt outright with a successful third defense on 9 April 2011 beating John Donnelly at the Rainton Meadows Arena in Houghton-le-Spring, stopping him in the fifth round. Hall said of his achievement of winning the belt outright "this is my world title, it's just unbelievable that I've got this for the rest of my life. It's such an achievement for Darlington and the north east."

=== Hall vs. Butler ===
On 17 September 2017, Hall fought Paul Butler, ranked #5 by the WBA and IBF and #9 by the WBO at bantamweight. Butler won the fight via unanimous decision.

=== Hall vs. McDonnell ===
In his next bout, Hall faced Gavin McDonnell, ranked #3 by the WBC, #4 by the WBA and #11 by the IBF at super bantamweight. McDonnell won the fight via unanimous decision, winning on all three scorecards, 117-111, 117-111 and 115-113.

== Professional boxing record ==
30 fights	21 wins	7 losses
By knockout	7	0
By decision	14	7
Draws	2	

No.	Result	Record	Opponent	Type	Round, time	Date	Location	Notes
30	Loss	21–7–2	(United Kingdom) Gavin McDonnell	UD	12	16 Jun 2018	(United Kingdom) Metro Radio Arena, Newcastle, England	For WBC International super bantamweight title
29	Loss	21–6–2	(United Kingdom) Paul Butler	UD	12	17 Sep 2017	(United Kingdom) Echo Arena, Liverpool, England	For vacant WBA Continental bantamweight title
28	Win	21–5–2	(Nicaragua) Jose Aguilar	PTS	6	23 Jun 2017	(United Kingdom) Walker Activity Dome, Newcastle, England	
27	Loss	20–5–2	(United Kingdom) Lee Haskins	UD	12	10 Sep 2016	(United Kingdom) The O2 Arena, London, England	For IBF bantamweight title
26	Win	20–4–2	(Mexico) Rodrigo Guerrero	UD	12	16 Apr 2016	(United Kingdom) First Direct Arena, Leeds, England	
25	Win	19–4–2	(Argentina) Elvis Guillen	UD	8	21 Nov 2015	(United Kingdom) Manchester Arena, Manchester, England	
24	Win	18–4–2	(Spain) Arnoldo Solano	UD	8	5 Sep 2015	(United Kingdom) First Direct Arena, Leeds, England	
23	Win	17–4–2	(Argentina) Edwin Tellez	UD	8	1 Aug 2015	(United Kingdom) Craven Park Stadium, Hull, England	
22	Loss	16–4–2	(United States) Randy Caballero	UD	12	25 Oct 2014	Salle des etoiles, Monte Carlo, Monaco	For vacant IBF bantamweight title
21	Loss	16–3–2	(United Kingdom) Paul Butler	SD	12	7 Jun 2014	(United Kingdom) Metro Radio Arena, Newcastle, England	Lost IBF bantamweight title
20	Draw	16–2–2	(United Kingdom) Martin Ward	TD	2 (12), 0:35	29 Mar 2014	(United Kingdom) Metro Radio Arena, Newcastle, England	Retained IBF bantamweight title
19	Win	16–2–1	(South Africa) Vusi Malinga	UD	12	21 Dec 2013	(United Kingdom) First Direct Arena, Leeds, England	Won vacant IBF bantamweight title
18	Win	15–2–1	(United States) Sergio Perales	UD	12	11 May 2013	(United Kingdom) Keepmoat Stadium, Doncaster, England	Won vacant IBF Inter-Continental bantamweight title
17	Win	14–2–1	(United Kingdom) Josh Wale	UD	12	16 Nov 2012	(United Kingdom) Dolphin Centre, Darlington, England	Won vacant Commonwealth bantamweight title
16	Win	13–2–1	(Hungary) Adrian Fuzesy	PTS	6	22 Sep 2012	(United Kingdom) Don Valley Stadium, Sheffield, England	
15	Loss	12–2–1	(United Kingdom) Lee Haskins	UD	12	7 Jul 2012	(United Kingdom) Hand Arena, Clevedon, England	For vacant EBU bantamweight title
14	Win	12–1–1	(United Kingdom) Dai Davies	PTS	6	10 Dec 2011	(United Kingdom) Peterlee Leisure Centre, Peterlee, England	
13	Loss	11–1–1	(United Kingdom) Jamie McDonnell	UD	12	3 Sep 2011	(United Kingdom) Doncaster Dome, Doncaster, England	Lost British bantamweight title; For Commonwealth and EBU bantamweight titles
12	Win	11–0–1	(United Kingdom) John Donnelly	TKO	5 (12), 2:07	9 Apr 2011	(United Kingdom) Rainton Meadows Arena, Sunderland, England	Retained British bantamweight title
11	Win	10–0–1	(United Kingdom) Gary Davies	TKO	7 (12), 2:58	13 Nov 2010	(United Kingdom) Manchester Arena, Manchester, England	Retained British bantamweight title
10	Win	9–0–1	(United Kingdom) Martin Power	TKO	10 (12), 2:30	23 Jul 2010	(United Kingdom) Rainton Meadows Arena, Sunderland, England	Retained British bantamweight title
9	Win	8–0–1	(United Kingdom) Ian Napa	RTD	8 (12), 3:00	4 Jun 2010	(United Kingdom) Peterlee Leisure Centre, Peterlee, England	Won vacant British bantamweight title
8	Win	7–0–1	(Hungary) Richard Szebeledi	PTS	6	12 Feb 2010	(United Kingdom) York Hall, London, England	
7	Win	6–0–1	(United Kingdom) Martin Power	TKO	8 (8), 1:39	11 Sep 2009	(United Kingdom) Brentwood Centre, Essex, England	
6	Win	5–0–1	(United Kingdom) Jason Thomas	PTS	4	4 Sep 2009	(United Kingdom) Eston Sports Academy, Middlesbrough, England	
5	Win	4–0–1	(United Kingdom) Anthony Hanna	PTS	4	1 May 2009	(United Kingdom) Seaton Carew Mayfair Suite, Hartlepool, England	
4	Draw	3–0–1	(United Kingdom) Stuart McFadyen	PTS	6	29 Mar 2009	(United Kingdom) De Vere Whites Hotel, Bolton, England	
3	Win	3–0	(United Kingdom) Nick Seager	TKO	2 (4), 1:39	16 Jan 2009	(United Kingdom) Eston Sports Academy, Middlesbrough, England	
2	Win	2–0	(United Kingdom) Dougie Walton	TKO	6 (6), 1:47	6 Oct 2008	(United Kingdom) Holiday Inn, Birmingham, England	
1	Win	1–0	(Syria) Abdul Mghrbel	PTS	6	26 Apr 2008	(United Kingdom) Darlington & District Club, Darlington, England	

== See also ==
- List of world bantamweight boxing champions
- List of British world boxing champions

Sporting positions
Regional boxing titles
Vacant Title last held by Jamie McDonnell	British bantamweight champion 4 June 2010 – 3 September 2011	Succeeded by Jamie McDonnell
Vacant Title last held by Jamie McDonnell	Commonwealth bantamweight champion 16 November 2012 – 2013; Vacated	Vacant Title next held by Martin Ward
World boxing titles
Vacant Title last held by Jamie McDonnell	IBF bantamweight champion 21 December 2013 – 7 June 2014	Succeeded by Paul Butler
