= Matthew Marsh (boxer) =

British former professional boxer (born 1982)

Personal information
- Nationality: British
- Born: 1 August 1982 (age 44) West Ham
- Weight: Super bantamweight; Featherweight

Boxing career
- Club: West Ham ABC, London
- Stance: Orthodox

Boxing record
- Total fights: 15
- Wins: 13
- Win by KO: 1
- Losses: 2

Matthew Marsh (born 1 August 1982) is a British former professional boxer who competed from 2004 to 2010. He held the British super bantamweight title in 2008 and challenged once for the vacant Commonwealth super bantamweight title in 2010. As an amateur, he won two ABA championships, one at flyweight in 2001 and the other at bantamweight in 2004.

== Amateur career ==
Marsh represented the 2002 English team at the 2002 Commonwealth Games in Manchester, England, where he competed in the bantamweight division. He was eliminated by South Afican Nzimeni Msutu.

When he won the 2001 British ABA flyweight title and the 2004 British ABA bantamweight title, he was boxing out of the West Ham Amateur Boxing Club.

== Professional career ==
=== Early career ===
Marsh begun his professional career in September 2004 with a win over Freddy James at the York Hall in Bethnal Green. By December 2006 he had compiled a winning ledger of 6–0 with wins over the likes of Welshman Dai Davies and French journeyman Frederic Gosset, and had earned a crack at the Southern Area featherweight championship. He challenged reigning champion Rocky Dean at the Excel Arena in the London Docklands and won a 10-round decision. The two fighters met again in July 2007 this time for the super bantamweight version of the same belt. Going into the second match up Dean was confident saying "I am faster and fitter, and I am twice the fighter I was when I last met Marsh...Last time we met, I gave him the first four rounds. That will not happen again". It was not to be however and Marsh won another 10-round decision which meant that he now held the southern area title at two different weights.

=== Defeat to Mathews ===
Following the back to back wins over Rocky Dean, Marsh once again stepped up to featherweight to box the current holder of the WBU title Derry Mathews. Mathews was himself a former ABA bantamweight champion, winning the title in 2002 two years before Marsh would pick up the same crown. The fight in October 2007 ended with a first defeat for Marsh with the step up in class proving a bit too much when the fight was stopped in the 11th round. It was the first time Marsh had been taken beyond 10 rounds and observers noted that the fatigue was beginning to show as he struggled into the later stages.

=== British champion ===
Marsh responded to his first career defeat in style, knocking out Tanzanian fighter Ajibu Salum in the first round of his next bout. The knockout was significant in that it was the first time in his fledgling career that Marsh has stopped an opponent. In June 2008 Marsh met the current British super bantamweight champion Esham Pickering and won a unanimous points decision over 12 rounds. Pickering, a former European champion at the weight, was confident going into the bout saying "I just think I will blow him away, I can beat him in every department." Marsh however was dominant from the first bell landing the most punches and being generally busier. Marsh made the first defence of his new title against the man he had already beaten twice, Rocky Dean, at the York Hall on 21 November 2008. The fight ended with a majority decision for the champion handing Marsh his third win over Dean. Marsh had been due to defend his title for the second time on 17 April 2009 against English champion Mark Moran however he struggled to make the super bantamweight weight limit and was forced to vacate the title. Jason Booth, the reigning Commonwealth bantamweight champion stepped in and defeated Moran with a win in the sixth round.

=== Route back to contention ===
Following a break from boxing Marsh returned to action on 18 September 2009 to fight Josh Wale for the vacant English super bantamweight crown. Despite winning the fight Marsh was unable to claim the belt as he once again failed to make the weight limit after weighing in six ounces over. On 18 December 2009 Marsh beat Marc Callaghan over six rounds at the York Hall and on 5 February 2010 challenged Jason Booth for the British and Commonwealth titles. The fight, at the Harvey Hadden Leisure Centre in Nottingham, resulted in a second career defeat for Marsh as he failed to reclaim his old title. Booth was able to claim the Lonsdale belt outright after the fight when a cut above Marsh's right eye forced the fight to be stopped in the 11th round.

Preceded by Esham Pickering; WPTS 12	British Super bantamweight Champion; 27 June 2008 – 17 April 2009	Succeeded by Jason Booth
