= Paul Butler (boxer) =

English boxer (born 1988)

Personal information
- Nickname: Baby Faced Assassin
- Born: Paul Michael Butler; 11 November 1988 (age 37) Ellesmere Port, Cheshire, England
- Height: 5 ft 1 in (155 cm)
- Weight: Super flyweight; Bantamweight

Boxing career
- Reach: 65 in (165 cm)
- Stance: Orthodox

Boxing record
- Total fights: 39
- Wins: 36
- Win by KO: 17
- Losses: 3
Medal record
Men's Amateur boxing
English National Championships
| Silver medal – second place | 2007 London | Light-flyweight |
| Gold medal – first place | 2010 London | Flyweight |

Paul Butler (born 11 November 1988) is an English professional boxer and two-time bantamweight world champion, having held the International Boxing Federation (IBF) title in 2014 and the World Boxing Organisation (WBO) title in 2022. He also held multiple regional titles, including the British and Commonwealth super-flyweight titles in 2012 and 2013, respectively.

== Amateur career ==
Butler won the 2010 Amateur Boxing Association British flyweight title, when boxing out of the Vauxhall Motors ABC.

== Professional career ==
=== Early career ===
Butler made his professional debut against Anwar Alfadi on 11 December 2010 winning by points after four rounds of contesting. Butler amassed an 8–0 record during the next 23 months, with three of those victories coming by way of stoppage.

Butler faced John Donnelly for the vacant British super-flyweight title on 9 November 2012 at the Liverpool Olympia in Liverpool, England. Butler won the BoxNation broadcast bout by a first–round knockout. He floored Donnelly with a strike to the ribs after just 59 seconds, which left Donnelly unable to rise in time for the ten–count. During the post–fight drug test, Donnelly tested positive for benzoylecgonine.

Following a fourth–round technical knockout of Anwar Alfadi on 21 March 2013, Butler challenged Yaqub Kareem for the Commonwealth super-flyweight title on 20 April 2013, at the Wembley Arena in London, England. He won the fight by a fifth–round technical–knockout. Butler made his first and only Commonwealth title defense against Najah Ali on 28 June 2013. He won the fight by a fourth–round knockout.

Butler faced Miguel González for the vacant WBO Inter-Continental super-flyweight title on 21 September 2013. He won the fight by a dominant unanimous decision, with scores of 117–112, 119–110 and 120–108. Butler made the first defense of his secondary title defense against Ruben Montoya on 7 December 2013, with the vacant WBA Inter-Continental super-flyweight title being on the line as well. He once again won by unanimous decision, with scores of 120–108, 120–109 and 118–110.

Butler moved up to bantamweight for his next bout against Oreste Bernabe Nieva, which took place on 8 March 2014, with the vacant WBA Inter-Continental bantamweight title being on the line. He won the fight by a fourth–round knockout.

=== IBF bantamweight champion ===
Butler was scheduled to challenge the reigning IBF bantamweight champion Stuart Hall, in the latter's second title defense. The bout was scheduled for 7 June 2014, and took place at the Utilita Arena Newcastle in Newcastle, England, the champion's hometown. The bout was broadcast by BoxNation. Butler won the fight by split decision. Two judges scored the fight 117–111 and 115–113 for Butler, while the third judge scored it 115–113 for Hall. Butler had a slow start to fight, but appeared to take over as the fight progressed.

Butler faced Ismael Garnica in a non–title bout on 25 October 2014, at the Echo Arena in Liverpool, England. He dominated the fight from start to finish, and won by unanimous decision, with all three judges awarding him every single round of the bout. Following his victory against Garnica, Butler relinquished the IBF bantamweight title, in order to compete against fighters with whom he had size parity, stating "...I'm a natural 115 pounder".

=== Post championship career ===
==== Return to super-flyweight ====
After vacating the IBF bantamweight title, Butler moved back down to super–flyweight in order to challenge the reigning IBF super-flyweight champion Zolani Tete. The title bout was scheduled as the main event of a BoxNation broadcast card, which was held on 6 March 2015. Tete won the fight by an eight–round knockout. He floored Butler with two consecutive left uppercuts, which left the challenger unable to rise from the canvas in time to beat the ten count.

After suffering the first loss of his professional career, Butler jumped up in weight to super-bantamweight, in order to face Gustavo Molina on 11 July 2015. He won the fight by a fifth-round technical knockout. After successfully bouncing back from his loss to Tete, Butler returned to super-flyweight to face Hector Rolando Gusman on 3 October 2015. He won the fight by a first-round knockout, stopping Gusman with a body shot just thirty seconds into the bout.

Butler faced Silviu Olteanu for the vacant WBO European super-flyweight title on 19 December 2015. He won the fight by an eight-round technical knockout, stopping the Romanian with a well place hook to the body. Butler next faced Sebastian Sanchez for the vacant WBO International super-flyweight title on 12 March 2016. He won the fight by a ninth-round knockout.

==== Butler vs. Ruiz ====
Butler faced Alexis Ruiz on 22 October 2016, in his return to bantamweight. He won the fight on points.

==== Butler vs. Cazares ====
Butler faced Alexander Cazares on 3 December 2016, and once again won the fight on points.

==== Butler vs. Ruiz ====
Butler notched his second ever stoppage victory at bantamweight against Ruben Dario Ruiz on 8 April 2017, as he knocked Ruiz out in the fourth round.

==== Butler vs. Hall ====
Butler faced Stuart Hall for the vacant WBA Continental bantamweight title on 17 September 2017. He won the fight by unanimous decision, with scores of 118–110, 118–110 and 117–111.

==== Butler vs. Rodriguez ====
Butler was scheduled face the undefeated Emmanuel Rodríguez for the vacant IBF bantamweight title on 5 May 2018, at The O2 Arena, on the undercard of the Tony Bellew and David Haye cruiserweight rematch. Rodriguez was ranked #3 by the IBF at bantamweight at the time. Butler missed weight prior to the bout, which left him ineligible to win the vacant belt. He weighed in at 121.5 pounds, 3.5 pounds over the championship limit. Butler furthermore refused to weigh himself in a second attempt. Rodríguez won the fight by a dominant unanimous decision, with scores of 118–108, 120–106, 120–106. Butler was knocked down twice in the final minute of the first round, and failed to achieve much headway during the remaining eleven rounds.

==== Butler vs. Boyeaux ====
Butler returned to action six months later, on 3 November 2018, to face Yoan Boyeaux. He won the fight on points.

==== Butler vs. Majiha ====
Butler faced Fadhili Majiha on 30 March 2019, and again won the fight on points.

==== Butler vs. Sanchez ====
Butler notched his first bantamweight stoppage victory in two years on 18 May 2019, knocking Salvador Hernandez Sanchez out in the sixth-round.

==== Butler vs. Reyes ====
Butler faced the journeyman Joseafat Reyes on 22 September 2019, and won the fight on points.

==== Butler vs. Walker ====
Butler's sole fight of 2020 came on 18 October, against Ryan Walker, whom he beat on points.

==== Butler vs. Garcia ====
Butler was expected to face Joseph Agbeko for the vacant WBO International bantamweight title on 25 June 2021. Agbeko was forced to withdraw from the bout due to visa issues, and was replaced by Willibaldo Garcia. Butler won the fight by split decision, with scores of 96–94, 97–92 and 94–95.

=== Second bantamweight title reign ===
==== Butler vs. Sultan ====
Butler was booked to fight Jonas Sultan on 22 April 2022, at the M&S Bank Arena in Liverpool, England for the vacant WBO interim bantamweight title. Butler was originally scheduled to challenge WBO bantamweight champion John Riel Casimero on 11 December 2021 and 22 April 2022, before Casimero withdrew before the weigh-ins due to gastritis, and not being permitted by British Boxing Board of Control (BBBofC) due to medical guidelines violation, respectively. Sultan was ranked #10 by The Ring, #4 by the WBA, #4 by the WBO and #12 by the IBF at bantamweight. Butler captured the vacant title by unanimous decision, with scores of 116–112, 117–111 and 117–111, utilizing out-fighting tactics to control the fight for the majority of the bout. On 4 May, the WBO officially stripped Casimero of the full title and elevated Butler from interim to full champion.

==== Butler vs. Inoue ====
On 25 August 2022, it was announced that Butler would face undefeated WBA (Super), WBC, IBF, and The Ring bantamweight champion Naoya Inoue in a title unification bout. It took place on 13 December 2022, at the Ariake Arena in Tokyo, Japan, and was broadcast by Amazon Prime domestically and by ESPN+ in the United States. It was Butler's first fight outside of the United Kingdom. He lost the fight by 11th round KO.

== Professional boxing record ==
| 39 fights | 36 wins | 3 losses |
|---|---|---|
| By knockout | 17 | 2 |
| By decision | 19 | 1 |

| No. | Result | Record | Opponent | Type | Round, time | Date | Location | Notes |
|---|---|---|---|---|---|---|---|---|
| 39 | Win | 36–3 | Nabil Ahmed | KO | 2 (6), 1:45 | 8 Dec 2023 | The Fuse, Partington, Manchester, England | |
| 38 | Win | 35–3 | Jeison Cervantes | TKO | 1 (8), 2:42 | 16 Jun 2023 | Humo Arena, Tashkent, Uzbekistan | |
| 37 | Loss | 34–3 | Naoya Inoue | KO | 11 (12), 1:09 | 13 Dec 2022 | Ariake Arena, Tokyo, Japan | Lost WBO bantamweight title; For WBA (Super), WBC, IBF, and The Ring bantamweight titles |
| 36 | Win | 34–2 | Jonas Sultan | UD | 12 | 22 Apr 2022 | M&S Bank Arena, Liverpool, England | Won vacant WBO interim bantamweight title |
| 35 | Win | 33–2 | Willibaldo García | SD | 10 | 25 Jun 2021 | Whites Hotel, Bolton, England | Won vacant WBO International bantamweight title |
| 34 | Win | 32–2 | Ryan Walker | PTS | 8 | 18 Oct 2020 | Production Park Studios, South Kirkby, England | |
| 33 | Win | 31–2 | Jose Aguilar | PTS | 6 | 14 Dec 2019 | Knowsley Leisure & Culture Park, Huyton, England | |
| 32 | Win | 30–2 | Joseafat Reyes | PTS | 6 | 22 Sep 2019 | Woodhouse Park Lifestyle Centre, Manchester, England | |
| 31 | Win | 29–2 | Salvador Hernandez Sanchez | KO | 6 (8) | 18 May 2019 | SSE Hydro, Glasgow, Scotland | |
| 30 | Win | 28–2 | Fadhili Majiha | PTS | 6 | 30 Mar 2019 | Echo Arena, Liverpool, England | |
| 29 | Win | 27–2 | Yoan Boyeaux | PTS | 10 | 3 Nov 2018 | SSE Hydro, Glasgow, Scotland | |
| 28 | Loss | 26–2 | Emmanuel Rodríguez | UD | 12 | 5 May 2018 | The O2 Arena, London, England | For vacant IBF bantamweight title |
| 27 | Win | 26–1 | Jefferson Vargas | TKO | 8 (8), 2:02 | 3 Feb 2018 | The O2 Arena, London, England | |
| 26 | Win | 25–1 | Stuart Hall | UD | 12 | 17 Sep 2017 | Echo Arena, Liverpool, England | Won vacant WBA Continental bantamweight title |
| 25 | Win | 24–1 | Ruben Dario Ruiz | TKO | 4 (6) | 8 Apr 2017 | Manchester Arena, Manchester, England | |
| 24 | Win | 23–1 | Alexander Cazares | PTS | 10 | 3 Dec 2016 | Lagoon Leisure Centre, Paisley, Scotland | |
| 23 | Win | 22–1 | Alexis Ruiz | PTS | 10 | 22 Oct 2016 | Whites Hotel, Bolton, England | |
| 22 | Win | 21–1 | Sebastian Sanchez | KO | 9 (12) | 12 Mar 2016 | Echo Arena, Liverpool, England | Won vacant WBO International super-flyweight title |
| 21 | Win | 20–1 | Silviu Olteanu | TKO | 6 (10), 2:45 | 19 Dec 2015 | Manchester Arena, Manchester, England | Won vacant WBO European super-flyweight title |
| 20 | Win | 19–1 | Hector Rolando Guzman | KO | 1 (10), 0:30 | 3 Oct 2015 | Civic Hall, Wolverhampton, England | |
| 19 | Win | 18–1 | Gustavo Molina | TKO | 5 (10), 2:53 | 11 Jul 2015 | Manchester Velodrome, Manchester, England | |
| 18 | Loss | 17–1 | Zolani Tete | TKO | 8 (12), 1:34 | 6 Mar 2015 | Echo Arena, Liverpool, England | For IBF super-flyweight title |
| 17 | Win | 17–0 | Ismael Garnica | PTS | 10 | 25 Oct 2014 | Echo Arena, Liverpool, England | |
| 16 | Win | 16–0 | Stuart Hall | SD | 12 | 7 Jun 2014 | Metro Radio Arena, Newcastle, England | Won IBF bantamweight title |
| 15 | Win | 15–0 | Oreste Bernabe Nieva | KO | 4 (12), 1:25 | 8 Mar 2014 | Aintree Equestrian Centre, Liverpool, England | Won vacant WBA Inter-Continental bantamweight title |
| 14 | Win | 14–0 | Ruben Montoya | UD | 12 | 7 Dec 2013 | Echo Arena, Liverpool, England | Retained WBO Inter-Continental super-flyweight title; Won vacant WBA Inter-Continental super-flyweight title |
| 13 | Win | 13–0 | Miguel González | UD | 12 | 21 Sep 2013 | Copper Box Arena, London, England | Won vacant WBO Inter-Continental super-flyweight title |
| 12 | Win | 12–0 | Najah Salah Ali | KO | 4 (12), 2:04 | 28 Jun 2013 | Liverpool Olympia, Liverpool, England | Retained Commonwealth super-flyweight title |
| 11 | Win | 11–0 | Yaqub Kareem | TKO | 5 (12), 0:24 | 20 Apr 2013 | Wembley Arena, London, England | Won Commonwealth super-flyweight title |
| 10 | Win | 10–0 | Anwar Alfadi | TKO | 4 (4), 2:46 | 21 Mar 2013 | York Hall, London, England | |
| 9 | Win | 9–0 | John Donnelly | KO | 1 (12), 1:09 | 9 Nov 2012 | Liverpool Olympia, Liverpool, England | Won vacant British super-flyweight title |
| 8 | Win | 8–0 | Ashley Sexton | PTS | 10 | 5 Jul 2012 | York Hall, London, England | |
| 7 | Win | 7–0 | Hyusein Hyuseinov | TKO | 3 (6), 1:52 | 18 May 2012 | Bowlers Exhibition Centre, Manchester, England | |
| 6 | Win | 6–0 | Michael Ramabeletsa | PTS | 8 | 20 Jan 2012 | Liverpool Olympia, Liverpool, England | |
| 5 | Win | 5–0 | David Kanalas | KO | 1 (6), 2:39 | 15 Oct 2011 | Echo Arena, Liverpool, England | |
| 4 | Win | 4–0 | Delroy Spencer | PTS | 6 | 17 Sep 2011 | Liverpool Olympia, Liverpool, England | |
| 3 | Win | 3–0 | Anwar Alfadi | PTS | 4 | 16 Jul 2011 | Echo Arena, Liverpool, England | |
| 2 | Win | 2–0 | Francis Croes | TKO | 5 (6), 0:36 | 2 Apr 2011 | Liverpool Olympia, Liverpool, England | |
| 1 | Win | 1–0 | Anwar Alfadi | PTS | 4 | 11 Dec 2010 | Echo Arena, Liverpool, England | |

== See also ==
- List of male boxers
- List of British world boxing champions
- List of world bantamweight boxing champions

Sporting positions
Amateur boxing titles
| Previous: Gamal Yafai | ABA Flyweight champion 2010 | Next: Jason Cunningham |
Regional boxing titles
| Vacant Title last held by Lee Haskins | British super-flyweight champion 9 November 2012 – 2015; Vacated | Vacant Title next held by Kal Yafai |
| Preceded by Yaqub Kareem | Commonwealth super-flyweight champion 20 April 2013 – 2014; Vacated | Vacant Title next held by Kal Yafai |
| Vacant Title last held by Kakhramon Orzikulov | WBO Inter-Continental super-flyweight champion 21 September 2013 – February 2014; Vacated | Vacant Title next held by Jamie Conlan |
| Vacant Title last held by Ricardo Núñez | WBA Inter-Continental super-flyweight champion 7 December 2013 – February 2014; Vacated | Vacant Title next held by Kal Yafai |
| Vacant Title last held by Lee Haskins | WBA Inter-Continental bantamweight champion 8 March 2014 – May 2014; Vacated | Vacant Title next held by Nordine Oubaali |
| Vacant Title last held by Omar Narváez | WBO International super-flyweight champion 12 March 2016 – September 2016; Vacated | Vacant Title next held by Rex Tso |
| New title | WBA Continental bantamweight champion 30 September 2017 – 2018; Vacated | Vacant Title next held by Thomas Essomba |
| Vacant Title last held by Jose Velasquez | WBO International bantamweight champion 25 June 2021 – 23 April 2022; Vacated | Vacant Title next held by Jason Moloney |
World boxing titles
| Preceded by Stuart Hall | IBF bantamweight champion 7 June 2014 – 2 July 2014; Vacated | Vacant Title next held by Randy Caballero |
| Vacant Title last held by John Riel Casimero | WBO bantamweight champion Interim title 22 April 2022 - 3 May 2022; Promoted to full champion | Vacant |
| Preceded by John Riel Casimero; Stripped | WBO bantamweight champion 3 May 2022 – 13 December 2022 | Succeeded by Naoya Inoue |
