= Andy Bell (boxer) =

English boxer

Personal information
- Nickname: Bellie
- Nationality: British
- Born: Andrew Langley; 16 July 1985 (age 41) Doncaster, England
- Height: 5 ft 8 in (173 cm)
- Weight: Super flyweight; Bantamweight

Boxing career
- Reach: 67 in (170 cm)
- Stance: Orthodox

Boxing record
- Total fights: 18
- Wins: 11
- Win by KO: 3
- Losses: 7

Andrew Langley (born 16 July 1985), better known as Andy Bell, is a British former professional boxer who competed from 2004 to 2010. He held the British super flyweight title in 2008.

== Early Professional Career ==
Andy begun his professional career in November 2004 with a 5th round stoppage over journeyman Steve Gethin at the Mansfield Leisure Center. His next two fights were also held at the same venue and also ended with victories giving him a record of 3–0. A change of venue however coincided with his first loss as a professional losing to fellow prospect Wayne Bloy at the Askern Miners Welfare Club in Askern. A further loss followed the following month in May 2006 when he lost to former victim Steve Gethin, this time it was Bell who ended up getting stopped in the 2nd round. Two more fights in 2006 would end with a win against journeyman Shaun Walton and a loss to prospect Jamie McDonnell. Despite a promising start to his pro career Bell finished 2006 with a disappointing record of 4–3.

== English Champion ==
Bell's first fight of 2007 was in April and saw him travelling to Shrewsbury where he would compete for the Midlands Area bantamweight title against Neil Marston. For Bell it was his first 10-round fight but it wouldn't end up going the distance when the fight was stopped in the 8th round and Andy Bell was crowned the new Midlands Area champion. Five more fights that year saw Andy claim five more wins and a couple more titles. He beat Mo Khalid to win the British Masters bantamweight title in June and much more significantly stopped Robert Nelson in September to win the English super flyweight crown. In December 2007 he crowned an excellent year by beating former conqueror Wayne Bloy in the first defence of his English crown.

== British Champion ==
The toughest fight of his career so far took place in March 2008 when Bell fought reigning British champion Chris Edwards for the national super flyweight belt live on Sky Sports. The fight took place at the Barnsley Metrodome and ended with victory for the man from Doncaster who won a unanimous decision over the champion. In November 2008 Bell faced another tough contest when for his first defence he took on former Commonwealth champion Lee Haskins at the Robin Park Center in Wigan again in a bout again shown live on Sky. The fight ended with defeat for Bell as Haskins claimed victory in a close fight over 12 rounds.

== Suspension from Boxing ==
On 13 January 2009 Andy Bell received a six-month ban following a positive drug test which showed traces of cannabis in his system. The test had been taken after the defeat to Haskins and a hearing held to hear the matter took place on 8 January 2009. The case was dealt with by Sports Resolution UK and the Anti-doping panel who decided that Bell was guilty of taking a banned substance. Before the sanction was announced Bell had been due to meet former amateur star Don Broadhurst in a challenge for his Commonwealth title. He returned to the ring on 5 February 2010 only to suffer defeat for the second time in a row to unbeaten prospect Paul Edwards and suffered a further setback, when on 19 March 2009, he was stopped in the first round by the former Bantamweight British title holder Gary Davies at the Leigh sports centre. On 28 May 2010 Bell continued his losing streak, retiring in the 3rd round against John Donnelly in a match up staged at super bantamweight.

== Professional boxing record ==
18 fights	11 wins	7 losses
By knockout	3	4
By decision	8	3

No.	Result	Record	Opponent	Type	Round, time	Date	Location	Notes
18	Loss	11–7	John Donnelly	RTD	3 (6), 3:00	28 May 2010	Huddersfield Sports Centre, Huddersfield, England	
17	Loss	11–6	Gary Davies	KO	1 (8), 2:39	19 Mar 2010	Leigh Sports Village, Leigh, England	
16	Loss	11–5	Paul Edwards	PTS	6	5 Feb 2010	Harvey Hadden Leisure Centre, Nottingham, England	
15	Loss	11–4	Lee Haskins	UD	12	7 Nov 2008	Robin Park Centre, Wigan, England	Lost British super-flyweight title
14	Win	11–3	Chris Edwards	UD	12	28 Mar 2008	Metrodome, Barnsley, England	Won British super-flyweight title
13	Win	10–3	Wayne Bloy	PTS	10	1 Dec 2007	Victoria Leisure Centre, Nottingham, England	Retained English super-flyweight title
12	Win	9–3	Robert Nelson	TKO	7 (10), 2:55	7 Sep 2007	Doncaster Dome, Doncaster, England	Won inaugural English super-flyweight title
11	Win	8–3	Delroy Spencer	PTS	6	22 Jul 2007	Debdale Sports Ground, Mansfield Woodhouse, England	
10	Win	7–3	Mo Khaled	PTS	10	17 Jun 2007	Civic Centre, Mansfield, England	
9	Win	6–3	Delroy Spencer	PTS	4	19 May 2007	Victoria Leisure Centre, Nottingham, England	
8	Win	5–3	Neil Marston	TKO	8 (10), 1:55	1 Apr 2007	Lord Hill Hotel, Shrewsbury, England	Won vacant Midlands Area bantamweight title
7	Loss	4–3	Jamie McDonnell	TKO	3 (6), 2:22	1 Dec 2006	Doncaster Dome, Doncaster, England	
6	Win	4–2	Shaun Walton	PTS	6	6 Oct 2006	Civic Centre, Mansfield, England	
5	Loss	3–2	Steve Gethin	TKO	2 (6), 0:29	13 May 2006	Sutton Leisure Complex, Sutton-in-Ashfield, England	
4	Loss	3–1	Wayne Bloy	PTS	4	24 Apr 2005	Askern Miners Welfare Club, Askern, England	
3	Win	3–0	Abdul Mghrbel	PTS	4	6 Mar 2005	Mansfield Leisure Centre, Mansfield, England	
2	Win	2–0	Dean Ward	PTS	6	10 Dec 2004	Mansfield Leisure Centre, Mansfield, Englaind	
1	Win	1–0	Steve Gethin	TKO	5 (6), 0:50	22 Oct 2004	Mansfield Leisure Centre, Mansfield, England	

Preceded by Chris Edwards; WPTS 12	British Super flyweight Champion; 28 March 2008 – 7 November 2008	Succeeded by Lee Haskins
