= Gary Nickels =

Retired English boxer

Personal information
- Nationality: British (English)
- Born: 20 June 1958 Paddington

Sport
- Sport: Boxing

Gary N Nickels (born 1958) is a retired English boxer.

== Boxing career ==
Nickels was the National Champion in 1978 after winning the prestigious Amateur Boxing Association British flyweight title, boxing out of Repton ABC.

He represented England in the -51 kg flyweight division, at the 1978 Commonwealth Games in Edmonton, Alberta, Canada.

He turned professional on 9 October 1978 and fought in 32 fights.
