= Lee Haskins =

English boxer

Personal information
- Nickname: Playboy
- Nationality: British
- Born: 29 January 1983 (age 43) Bristol, England
- Height: 5 ft 5 in (165 cm)
- Weight: Flyweight; Super-flyweight; Bantamweight; Super-bantamweight

Boxing career
- Reach: 66 in (168 cm)
- Stance: Southpaw

Boxing record
- Total fights: 41
- Wins: 36
- Win by KO: 14
- Losses: 5

Lee Haskins (born 29 January 1983) is a British former professional boxer who competed between 2003 and February 2020. He held the IBF bantamweight title from 2015 to 2017, and the IBF interim title in 2015. At regional level, he held the Commonwealth flyweight title in 2006; the British super-flyweight title from 2008 to 2009; the Commonwealth super-flyweight title in 2009; the British bantamweight title in 2013; and the European bantamweight title twice between 2012 and 2015.

== Early life ==
Lee Haskins was born in Lockleaze, a district of Bristol.

== Professional career ==
=== Early career ===
Haskins made his professional debut in March 2003 when he took on and defeated Ben Cornthwaite stopping him in the first round at Ashton Gate Stadium, the home of Bristol City FC. In his very next contest he defeated future British champion Chris Edwards this time over 6 rounds at the same venue. By the time he had compiled a winning ledger of 9–0 he challenged journeyman fighter Delroy Spencer for the English Flyweight title and claimed the belt after Spencer retired after the third round of the 10 round contest. In February 2006 almost three years from his professional debut and now with a winning record of 13–0 Haskins challenged the Tanzanian fighter Anthony Mathias for the vacant Commonwealth Flyweight title. He stopped Mathias in the 2nd round at The Pavilions in Plymouth to pick up his second career title.

=== Commonwealth title fights ===
Following the victory over Mathias, Haskins returned to Bristol just two months later for his first defence against South African Zolile Mbityi. The fight as reported by the BBC was often a 'messy and bad tempered affair' with Haskins never really hitting top gear. Haskins won the fight on points over 12 rounds.

In October 2006 Haskins chose to move up a weight division and compete for the Commonwealth Bantamweight title. The current champion, another South African called Tshifhiwa Munyai had claimed the belt with an upset win over British Bantamweight title holder Martin Power. Going into the fight Haskins was confident saying "I think he's gonna come in and try to take me out. That's what I want. I've changed a few things, and hopefully it'll work on the night." The fight which was Haskins debut at the York Hall in London ended in the 6th round with Munyai scoring a tko.

=== British title challenges ===
Following the stoppage, Haskins next meaningful fight was almost a year later in September 2007 when he returned to the York Hall to take on new British Bantamweight holder Ian Napa. The fight once again proved to be a disappointment for Haskins with ringside reporters claiming he was looking tired before he retired hurt with an arm injury in the 7th round, handing the feather-fisted Napa the only knockout win of his career. in March 2008 Haskins put the memory of defeat behind him by scoring a win over former British title challenger Jamie McDonnell over 8 rounds in Barnsley. The win set him up for another crack at a title, this time against the British Super-Flyweight champion Andy Bell. The fight with Bell took place in November 2008 and ended with a unanimous points decision for the Bristolian in what was considered to be a close fight. Speaking after the fight Haskins paid tribute to his opponent saying "I don't know what to say. It feels great. I knew Andy Bell is a great fighter, he is very tough. He hits hard as well and it just feels great to be champion" On 10 July 2009 Haskins defended his belt for the first time against Sheffield's Ross Burkinshaw, winning in the 4th round.

=== British and Commonwealth champion ===
On 11 December 2009 Haskins added the Commonwealth Super Flyweight title to his collection after defeating the unbeaten Don Broadhurst on points in Newport, Wales and becoming a two weight Commonwealth champion. Haskins claimed the belt having scored a unanimous points victory on all three judges scorecards in what was described as a 'scrappy' contest. Following the fight Haskins was scheduled to face Italian Andrea Sarritzu for the European title at super flyweight only for the contest to be called off on a total of four occasions, another fight against the Frenchman Karim Guerfi also fell through after the fighters failed to agree terms. The delays meant that Haskins was out of the ring for over a year until on 30 April 2011 he met Bulgarian boxer Fikret Remziev over six rounds, scoring a fourth round stoppage, at the Olympiad Leisure Centre in Chippenham. Speaking about the delays promoter Chris Sanigar described the period as being "very frustrating" and said that he'd like to see Haskins fight for the British title again with a view to stepping up to Bantamweight to challenge Jamie McDonnell at some point in the future. To add to Haskin's disappointment, he was stripped of the Commonwealth belt after failing to defend it.

On 14 July 2011, Haskins travelled to Morocco to accept a short notice challenge for the WBA Inter continental and the IBF International bantamweight titles. His opponent, Mohamed Bouleghcha had won the titles in April and as the fight was at bantamweight meant that Haskins would have to not only concede home advantage but also weight advantage as he had not fought in the division for four years. Haskins won a victory over 12 rounds, including two knockdowns, and said that the victory represented that he was now ready for the world stage.

=== Prizefighter champion ===
In October 2011 Haskins became Prizefighter champion, without losing a single round throughout the tournament.

=== European champion ===
On 14 December 2012, Haskins had a big chance to step closer to a world title shot by facing Stuart Hall for the EBU European bantamweight title. He won the fight and became European bantamweight champion. Lee's next fight after that was to defend the title against Belgium fighter 'Stephane Jamoye' in Belgium. He lost the fight along with his European title, but the fight was rated by many critics as "one of the most entertaining fights of 2012". What followed over the next two years was being crowned British bantamweight champion, along with a few defences of the title. In February 2015 Haskins earned another opportunity to fight for the vacant EBU European title against French fighter 'Omar Lamiri' in Monte Carlo, Monaco. The fight was stopped due to Haskins suffering a cut over his right eye in a clash of heads during the 8th round. The fight went to the score cards, and as his first European title shot he was victorious.

=== World champion ===
In March 2015, Haskins received a call from the IBF confirming that he is to fight Japan's Ryosuke Iwasa, for the Interim world title due to the current champion Randy Caballero suffering from injury. Lee Haskins put on a remarkable display in his fight for the IBF world interim bantamweight title against Ryosuke Iwasa, and knocked out his opponent inside six rounds. Haskins is Bristol's first world champion in 15 years. He was set to fight Randy Caballero on 21 November 2015, however Caballero failed to make weight, and Haskins was promoted to full champion by the IBF. In May 2016, he defended the title for the first time, defeating Ivan Morales in Cardiff.

On 15 December 2016, Haskins made a successful second defence of his IBF World Bantamweight title on the undercard of the Gennady Golovkin vs. Kell Brook bill at The O2 against Stuart Hall. This would be the second time the pair had fought, with the first fight being for the vacant EBU Bantamweight title back in 2012. Haskins unorthodox angles and movement banked the early rounds to give Hall too much to do down the stretch and claim a unanimous decision win. The judges scored the bout 115–113, 117-111 and 116–112, all in favour of Haskins.

=== World Title loss & Comeback Trail ===
On 27 April 2017 it was announced that Haskins would make his third IBF Title defence against Ryan Burnett in Belfast at the Odyssey Arena.

==== Haskins vs. Joyce ====
On 1 February 2020, Haskins faced David Oliver Joyce. Haskins started well, dominating the first two rounds, but was stopped by Joyce at the end of the fifth round. After the fight, Haskins announced his retirement from professional boxing.

== Professional boxing record ==
| 41 fights | 36 wins | 5 losses |
|---|---|---|
| By knockout | 14 | 4 |
| By decision | 22 | 1 |

| No. | Result | Record | Opponent | Type | Round, time | Date | Location | Notes |
|---|---|---|---|---|---|---|---|---|
| 41 | Loss | 36–5 | David Oliver Joyce | TKO | 5 (10), 2:59 | 1 Feb 2020 | Ulster Hall, Belfast, Northern Ireland | For vacant WBO European super-bantamweight title |
| 40 | Win | 36–4 | Sergio Gonzalez | PTS | 6 | 5 Oct 2019 | Whitchurch Leisure Centre, Bristol, England | |
| 39 | Win | 35–4 | Isaac Quaye | PTS | 6 | 15 Dec 2017 | Merthyr Leisure Centre, Merthyr Tydfil, Wales | |
| 38 | Loss | 34–4 | Ryan Burnett | UD | 12 | 10 Jun 2017 | Odyssey Arena, Belfast, Northern Ireland | Lost IBF bantamweight title; Originally SD, later ruled UD after incorrect judge's scorecard |
| 37 | Win | 34–3 | Stuart Hall | UD | 12 | 10 Sep 2016 | The O2 Arena, London, England | Retained IBF bantamweight title |
| 36 | Win | 33–3 | Ivan Morales | UD | 12 | 14 May 2016 | Ice Arena, Cardiff, Wales | Retained IBF bantamweight title |
| 35 | Win | 32–3 | Ryosuke Iwasa | TKO | 6 (12), 2:10 | 16 May 2015 | Whitchurch Leisure Centre, Bristol, England | Won interim IBF bantamweight title |
| 34 | Win | 31–3 | Omar Lamiri | TD | 8 (12), 3:00 | 21 Feb 2015 | Salle des Étoiles, Monte Carlo, Monaco | Won vacant European bantamweight title |
| 33 | Win | 30–3 | Willy Velazquez | PTS | 10 | 05 Dec 2014 | City Academy Sports Centre, Bristol, England | |
| 32 | Win | 29–3 | Luke Wilton | TKO | 2 (10), 1:52 | 01 Mar 2014 | City Academy Sports Centre, Bristol, England | |
| 31 | Win | 28–3 | Jason Booth | UD | 12 | 08 Nov 2013 | City Academy Sports Centre, Bristol, England | Retained British bantamweight title |
| 30 | Win | 27–3 | Martin Ward | TKO | 5 (12), 2:38 | 27 Apr 2013 | City Academy Sports Centre, Bristol, England | Won vacant British bantamweight title |
| 29 | Loss | 26–3 | Stephane Jamoye | TKO | 8 (12) | 14 Dec 2012 | Hallo Omnisport La Préalle, Herstal, Belgium | Lost European bantamweight title |
| 28 | Win | 26–2 | Stuart Hall | UD | 12 | 7 Jul 2012 | Hand Arena, Clevedon, England | Won vacant European bantamweight title |
| 27 | Win | 25–2 | Don Broadhurst | UD | 3 | 12 Oct 2011 | Olympia, Liverpool, England | Prizefighter 21: The super flyweights – final |
| 26 | Win | 24–2 | Ryan Farrag | UD | 3 | 12 Oct 2011 | Olympia, Liverpool, England | Prizefighter 21: The super flyweights – semi-final |
| 25 | Win | 23–2 | Terry Broadbent | UD | 3 | 12 Oct 2011 | Olympia, Liverpool, England | Prizefighter 21: The super flyweights – quarter-final |
| 24 | Win | 22–2 | Mohamed Bouleghcha | UD | 12 | 14 Jul 2011 | Place Jamaâ El Fna, Marrakesh, Morocco | |
| 23 | Win | 21–2 | Fikret Remziev | TKO | 4 (6), 1:31 | 30 Apr 2011 | Olympiad Leisure Centre, Chippenham, England | |
| 22 | Win | 20–2 | Don Broadhurst | UD | 12 | 11 Dec 2009 | Newport Centre, Newport, Wales | |
| 21 | Win | 19–2 | Ross Burkinshaw | TKO | 4 (12), 1:09 | 10 Jul 2009 | Seaburn Centre, Sunderland, England | |
| 20 | Win | 18–2 | Andy Bell | UD | 12 | 07 Nov 2008 | Robin Park Centre, Wigan, England | |
| 19 | Win | 17–2 | Jamie McDonnell | PTS | 8 | 28 Mar 2008 | Metrodome, Barnsley, England | |
| 18 | Loss | 16–2 | Ian Napa | RTD | 7 (12), 3:00 | 21 Sep 2007 | York Hall, London, England | |
| 17 | Win | 16–1 | Sumaila Badu | PTS | 6 | 24 Feb 2007 | Filton College Wise Campus, Bristol, England | |
| 16 | Loss | 15–1 | Tshifhiwa Munyai | TKO | 6 (12), 2:56 | 06 Oct 2006 | York Hall, London, England | |
| 15 | Win | 15–0 | Zolile Mbityi | UD | 12 | 07 Apr 2006 | Whitchurch Leisure Centre, Bristol, England | Retained Commonwealth flyweight title |
| 14 | Win | 14–0 | Anthony Mathias | TKO | 2 (10), 2:40 | 10 Feb 2006 | The Pavilions, Plymouth, England | Won vacant Commonwealth flyweight title |
| 13 | Win | 13–0 | Delroy Spencer | RTD | 2 (8), 3:00 | 19 Jun 2005 | The Pavilions, Plymouth, England | |
| 12 | Win | 12–0 | Andrzej Ziora | KO | 1 (8), 1:00 | 29 Apr 2005 | The Pavilions, Plymouth, England | |
| 11 | Win | 11–0 | Moses Kinyua | PTS | 10 | 08 Apr 2005 | Dolman Exhibition Hall, Bristol, England | |
| 10 | Win | 10–0 | Hugo Cardinale | KO | 1 (6) | 18 Feb 2005 | Dalacio de Deportes, Torrevieja, Spain | |
| 9 | Win | 9–0 | Delroy Spencer | RTD | 3 (10), 3:00 | 03 Dec 2004 | Dolman Exhibition Hall, Bristol, England | Won English flyweight title |
| 8 | Win | 8–0 | Junior Anderson | KO | 3 (6), 0:40 | 01 Oct 2004 | Dolman Exhibition Hall, Bristol, England | |
| 7 | Win | 7–0 | Sergey Tasimov | TKO | 5 (8), 2:15 | 03 Jul 2004 | Dolman Exhibition Hall, Bristol, England | |
| 6 | Win | 6–0 | Colin Moffett | TKO | 2 (4), 1:05 | 8 May 2004 | Whitchurch Leisure Centre, Bristol, England | |
| 5 | Win | 5–0 | Marty Kayes | PTS | 6 | 13 Feb 2004 | Dolman Exhibition Hall, Bristol, England | |
| 4 | Win | 4–0 | Jason Thomas | PTS | 6 | 05 Dec 2003 | Dolman Exhibition Hall, Bristol, England | |
| 3 | Win | 3–0 | Neil Read | PTS | 4 | 9 Oct 2003 | Whitchurch Leisure Centre, Bristol, England | |
| 2 | Win | 2–0 | Chris Edwards | PTS | 6 | 13 Jun 2003 | Ashton Gate Stadium, Bristol, England | |
| 1 | Win | 1–0 | Ankar Miah | TKO | 1 (4), 1:50 | 06 Mar 2003 | Ashton Gate Stadium, Bristol, England | |

| Preceded by Andy Bell | British Super Flyweight Champion; 7 November 2008 – 11 December 2009; Vacated | Succeeded by Paul Butler |
| Preceded by Dale Robinson vacated | Commonwealth Flyweight Champion; 10 February 2006 – 13 April 2007 vacated | Succeeded by Chris Edwards |
| Preceded by Don Broadhurst; WPTS 12 | Commonwealth Super Flyweight Champion; 11 December 2009 – present | Succeeded by Incumbent |
| New title | IBF Bantamweight Interim Champion; 13 June 2015 - 20 November 2015 | Promoted |
| Preceded by Randy Caballero; Stripped | IBF Bantamweight Champion; 20 November 2015 - 10 June 2017 | Succeeded by Ryan Burnett |
