= Ross Burkinshaw =

English boxer

Personal information
- Nickname: The Boss
- Nationality: British
- Born: Ross Burkinshaw; 10 August 1986 (age 40) Sheffield, England
- Height: 5 ft 8 in (173 cm)
- Weight: Super fly/Bantamweight

Boxing career
- Stance: Orthodox

Boxing record
- Total fights: 22
- Wins: 14
- Win by KO: 8
- Losses: 6
- Draws: 2

Ross Burkinshaw (born 10 August 1986) is an English former professional boxer who has won the British Boxing Board of Control (BBBofC) English Super flyweight title, bantamweight Commonwealth title beating Jason Cunningham and WBO European bantamweight Title. He has been a challenger for the BBBofC super flyweight title against Lee Haskins, the BBBofC English bantamweight title against Craig Lyon, and the BBBofC Central (England) Area super bantamweight title against Gavin McDonnell.

Before turning professional Ross had 55 amateur bouts, and also reached the finals of the ABA's in 2005.

== Professional record ==
				14 Wins (8 KO's), 6 Losses, 2 Draws	
Res	Record	Date	Opponent	Location	Title
Loss	14-6-2	2015-05-30	Klaas Mboyane	Magna Centre, Rotherham, Yorkshire, United Kingdom	WBO Inter-Continental bantamweight title
Win	14-5-2	2015-02-21	Benjamin Smoes	Octagon Centre, Sheffield, Yorkshire, United Kingdom	
Win	13-5-2	2014-09-06	Jason Cunningham	Doncaster Dome, Doncaster, Yorkshire, United Kingdom	Commonwealth (British Empire) bantamweight title
Win	12-5-2	2014-05-19	Malkhaz Tatrishvili	Octagon Centre, Sheffield, Yorkshire, United Kingdom	
Win	11-5-2	2014-03-29	Valentin Marinov	Metro Radio Arena, Newcastle, Tyne and Wear, United Kingdom	
Win	10-5-2	2014-03-02	Levan Garibashvili	Octagon Centre, Sheffield, Yorkshire, United Kingdom	
Loss	9-5-2	2013-07-06	Gavin McDonnell	Doncaster Dome, Doncaster, Yorkshire, United Kingdom	BBBofC Central Area super bantamweight title
Loss	9-4-2	2012-04-27	Michael Ramabeletsa	Don Valley Stadium, Sheffield, Yorkshire, United Kingdom	
Loss	9-3-2	2010-10-02	Craig Lyon	De Vere Whites Hotel, Bolton, Lancashire, United Kingdom	BBBofC English bantamweight title
Win	9-2-2	2010-05-21	Delroy Spencer	Ponds Forge Arena, Sheffield, Yorkshire, United Kingdom	
Win	8-2-2	2010-03-21	Daniel Thorpe	Don Valley Stadium, Sheffield, Yorkshire, United Kingdom	
Win	7-2-2	2009-11-22	Anwar Alfadli	Don Valley Stadium, Sheffield, Yorkshire, United Kingdom	
Loss	6-2-2	2009-07-10	Lee Haskins	Seaburn Centre, Sunderland, Tyne and Wear, United Kingdom	BBBofC British super flyweight title
Win	6-1-2	2009-04-23	Mike Robinson	Doncaster Dome, Doncaster, Yorkshire, United Kingdom	
Draw	5-1-2	2009-02-27	Mike Robinson	Don Valley Stadium, Sheffield, Yorkshire, United Kingdom	
Win	5-1-1	2008-10-10	Mike Holloway	Don Valley Stadium, Sheffield, Yorkshire, United Kingdom	
Loss	4-1-1	2008-02-15	Abdul Mghrbel	Don Valley Stadium, Sheffield, Yorkshire, United Kingdom	
Draw	4-0-1	2007-10-19	Shaun Doherty	Doncaster Dome, Doncaster, Yorkshire, United Kingdom	
Win	4-0-0	2007-09-16	Faycal Messaoudene	Don Valley Stadium, Sheffield, Yorkshire, United Kingdom	
Win	3-0-0	2007-07-13	Yordan Vasilev	Metrodome, Barnsley, Yorkshire, United Kingdom	
Win	2-0-0	2007-02-09	Delroy Spencer	Town Hall, Leeds, Yorkshire, United Kingdom	
Win	1-0-0	2006-11-03	Robert Bunford	Metrodome, Barnsley, Yorkshire, United Kingdom	

https://commons.wikimedia.org/wiki/File:The_champ.jpg
