= Henry Carpenter (boxer) =

British boxer

Personal information
- Nationality: British (English)
- Born: 28 December 1925; Peckham, London, England
- Died: 20 March 2001 (aged 75); Lewisham, London, England

Sport
- Sport: Boxing

Henry Francis Carpenter (28 December 1925 – 20 March 2001) was a British boxer. He competed in the men's flyweight event at the 1948 Summer Olympics.

Carpenter won the 1948 Amateur Boxing Association British flyweight title, when boxing out of the Bradfield ABC.
