= Jamie McDonnell (boxer) =

British boxer

Personal information
- Nationality: British
- Born: 30 March 1986 (age 40) Hatfield, Doncaster, South Yorkshire, England
- Height: 5 ft 10 in (178 cm)
- Weight: Bantamweight; Super bantamweight; Featherweight; Super featherweight

Boxing career
- Reach: 72 in (183 cm)
- Stance: Orthodox

Boxing record
- Total fights: 35
- Wins: 30
- Win by KO: 13
- Losses: 3
- Draws: 1
- No contests: 1

Jamie McDonnell (born 30 March 1986) is a British former professional boxer and two time bantamweight champion, who competed from 2005 to 2019. He held the IBF bantamweight title in 2013 and the WBA (Regular) bantamweight title from 2014 to 2018. He held multiple regional bantamweight championships, including the British title twice between 2010 and 2011; the Commonwealth title from 2010 to 2011; and the European title from 2010 to 2012. He is the twin brother of fellow boxer Gavin McDonnell.

== Professional career ==
McDonnell had his first professional contest in September 2005 when he scored a points win over Neal Reid at the Doncaster Dome. He won his next three fights before meeting Welshman Dai Davies again at the Doncaster Dome and scoring a draw over four rounds. On 13 October 2006 McDonnell beat Wayne Bloy over four rounds and in December of the same year he defeated future British super-flyweight champion Andy Bell over six rounds.

McDonnell's first title came in his next fight, meeting former victim Bloy on 23 February 2007 and scoring a third-round stoppage to lift the English bantamweight title. The newly crowned English champion now had a record of 8–0–1 and had never fought outside of Doncaster professionally.

=== Title challenges vs. Edwards and Haskins ===
McDonnell's first fight outside his home town saw him travel to the York Hall in London to defeat Nikita Lukin on 21 September 2007 in an eight-round fight. His next fight was to be for the British super-flyweight title at the Robin Park Centre in Wigan on 8 December 2007. The fight with Chris Edwards would be the first time the British super-flyweight had been contested making this the inaugural contest for the belt. The experienced Edwards eventually won the title via split decision after twelve hotly contested rounds handing a first defeat for the Doncaster man.

On 28 March 2008 McDonnell suffered his second defeat in a row having travelled to Barnsley to meet Lee Haskins. The fight with Haskins resulted in another close loss over eight rounds with Haskins himself coming off a British title loss to Ian Napa in the bantamweight division. The fight in Barnsley doubled as an eliminator for the winner to challenge for the super-flyweight title which Haskins would go on to win.

=== British bantamweight champion ===
Following two straight defeats to British level fighters, McDonnell regrouped by returning to m and beating journeyman Anthony Hanna via fifth-round stoppage. Two fights on the island of Jersey then followed with McDonnell scoring stoppage wins over imports Krastan Krastanov and Alain Bonnel before travelling back to Doncaster to defeat James Ancliff again before the final bell had been heard. On 22 January 2010 McDonnell got his chance to fight for the British title once again, this time for the bantamweight version held by the experienced Ian Napa. The fight, at the Brentwood Centre in Essex, saw a tough battle result in an upset split decision win for McDonnell with the added bonus of the vacant Commonwealth bantamweight title also being on the line.

=== European bantamweight champion ===
McDonnell's victory over Napa allowed him to step straight into a challenge for the European title against Jerome Arnould. The fight, in Cannes on 20 March 2010, resulted in a surprise victory for the man from Doncaster with a tenth-round stoppage over Arnould to lift his third title in a row. McDonnell made his first defence at the Doncaster Dome on 2 July 2010 against the newly crowned Italian champion Rodrigo Bracco and managed to retain the belt with a third-round stoppage win. He returned to the Dome for his second defence on 22 January 2011 beating Stephane Jamoye in a close contest with scores of 115–113, 114–113 and 114–114, despite having a point deducted in the eleventh round. McDonnell chose to defend the Commonwealth belt he won against Ian Napa in his next fight in Sheffield on 28 May 2011. Had he lost the contest, McDonnell would have been stripped of his European title but there were no such concerns as he scored a unanimous decision victory over Nick Otieno. Following the fight, promoter Frank Maloney said that a potential unification match with British champion Stuart Hall could be on the cards and that it was a fight that both the fans and the boxers themselves wanted to happen. Mcdonnell fought Hall on 3 September 2011 and won via unanimous decision to reclaim the British title.

=== IBF bantamweight champion ===
At the Keepmoat Stadium in Doncaster on 11 May 2013, McDonnell defeated Julio Ceja by unanimous decision to win the vacant IBF bantamweight title.

=== WBA bantamweight champion ===
On 31 May 2014 McDonnell fought Tamadang Da Rachawat for the WBA (Regular) bantamweight title on the undercard of Carl Froch vs. George Groves II at Wembley Stadium. McDonnell won by technical knockout when he caught Rachawat with a left hook in the tenth round; despite getting to his feet, the referee decided that Rachawat was in no state to continue as he visibly stumbled after getting up.

His first title defense was on 22 November 2014 at the Echo Arena in Liverpool. McDonnell retained his title, defeating Javier Chacon via tenth-round knockout.

His next title defense was also his US debut, against WBO bantamweight champion Tomoki Kameda, in which McDonnell was considered the underdog despite holding the title. Things were going Kameda's way in the early rounds, and he even managed to drop McDonnell in the third round. In the fifth round, things would start going McDonnell's way. All three judges thought McDonnell's performance in the latter part of the fight was enough, with all three scoring the fight 114–113 in favour of the Brit.

In the rematch, Kameda again started off strong, being the more active fighter during the first two rounds. McDonnell would then take control of most of the remainder of the fight, boxing intelligently and managing to drop Kameda in the closing round. This time, the Brit was the clear winner, winning the fight 117–110, 116–111 and 115–112 on the scorecards.

McDonnell next faced Fernando Vargas, as a late replacement for Juan Alberto Rosas. McDonnell used his high work rate and jab to establish control during the fight, dropping Vargas in the ninth round before the referee waved the fight off.

On 12 November 2016 McDonnell faced the WBA's #2 ranked bantamweight, Liborio Solis. It would prove to be a very tough fight for McDonnell, who got the win on the scorecards, despite many at ringside, along with the Sky Sports pundits, having Solis winning the fight.

On 1 February 2017 the WBA officially ordered a rematch between the two.

The rematch ended in a third-round no-contest after McDonnell suffered a cut below his left eye following an accidental clash of heads.

On 25 May 2018 McDonnell faced Naoya Inoue at the Ota City General Gymnasium in Tokyo, Japan. Inoue was simply too good for the visiting fighter, managing to drop him twice in the first two minutes of the fight, forcing the referee to wave it off. This was McDonnell's first and only loss by knockout.

Shortly after his loss, McDonnell announced that he will be moving up in weight.

On 11 May 2021, McDonnell announced his retirement from boxing via post on his Instagram account.

== Professional boxing record ==
35 fights	30 wins	3 losses
By knockout	13	1
By decision	17	2
Draws	1	
No contests	1	

No.	Result	Record	Opponent	Type	Round, time	Date	Location	Notes
35	Win	30–3–1 (1)	Cristian Narvaez	UD	6	28 Jun 2019	Allianz Cloud, Milan, Italy	
34	Loss	29–3–1 (1)	Naoya Inoue	KO	1 (12), 1:52	25 May 2018	Ota City General Gymnasium, Tokyo, Japan	Lost WBA (Regular) bantamweight title
33	NC	29–2–1 (1)	Liborio Solís	NC	3 (12), 2:33	4 Nov 2017	Salle des Etoiles, Monte Carlo, Monaco	Retained WBA (Regular) bantamweight title; Fight stopped after Solís cut due to accidental clash of heads
32	Win	29–2–1	Liborio Solís	UD	12	12 Nov 2016	Salle des Etoiles, Monte Carlo, Monaco	Retained WBA (Regular) bantamweight title
31	Win	28–2–1	Fernando Vargas	TKO	9 (12), 2:39	9 Apr 2016	O2 Arena, London, England	Retained WBA (Regular) bantamweight title
30	Win	27–2–1	Tomoki Kameda	UD	12	6 Sep 2015	American Bank Center, Corpus Christi, Texas, US	Retained WBA (Regular) bantamweight title
29	Win	26–2–1	Tomoki Kameda	UD	12	9 May 2015	State Farm Arena, Hidalgo, Texas, US	Retained WBA (Regular) bantamweight title
28	Win	25–2–1	Javier Chacon	TKO	10 (12), 0:39	22 Nov 2014	Echo Arena, Liverpool, England	Retained WBA (Regular) bantamweight title
27	Win	24–2–1	Tabtimdaeng Na Rachawat	KO	10 (12), 2:00	31 May 2014	Wembley Stadium, London, England	Won vacant WBA (Regular) bantamweight title
26	Win	23–2–1	Abigail Medina	PTS	8	14 Dec 2013	ExCel Arena, London, England	
25	Win	22–2–1	Bernard Imon	TKO	7 (8), 1:47	23 Nov 2013	Phones4u Arena, Manchester, England	
24	Win	21–2–1	Julio Ceja	MD	12	11 May 2013	Keepmoat Stadium, Doncaster, England	Won vacant IBF bantamweight title
23	Win	20–2–1	Darwin Zamora	RTD	8 (12), 3:00	20 Oct 2012	Motorpoint Arena, Sheffield, England	
22	Win	19–2–1	Iván Pozo	KO	2 (12), 2:11	3 Mar 2012	Hillsborough Leisure Centre, Sheffield, England	Retained European bantamweight title
21	Win	18–2–1	Stuart Hall	UD	12	3 Sep 2011	Doncaster Dome, Doncaster, England	Retained Commonwealth, and European bantamweight titles Won British bantamweight title
20	Win	17–2–1	Nick Otieno	UD	12	28 May 2011	Hillsborough Leisure Centre, Sheffield, England	Retained Commonwealth bantamweight title
19	Win	16–2–1	Stephane Jamoye	MD	12	22 Jan 2011	Doncaster Dome, Doncaster, England	Retained European bantamweight title
18	Win	15–2–1	Rodrigo Bracco	TKO	3 (12), 2:53	2 Jul 2010	Doncaster Dome, Doncaster, England	Retained European bantamweight title
17	Win	14–2–1	Jerome Arnould	TKO	10 (12)	20 Mar 2010	La Palestre, Le Cannet, France	Won vacant European bantamweight title
16	Win	13–2–1	Ian Napa	SD	12	22 Jan 2010	Brentwood Centre, Brentwood, England	Won British, and vacant Commonwealth bantamweight titles
15	Win	12–2–1	James Ancliff	TKO	1 (6), 2:27	4 Dec 2009	Doncaster Dome, Doncaster, England	
14	Win	11–2–1	Krastan Krastanov	TKO	3 (8), 1:27	14 Feb 2009	Hotel de France, St Helier, Jersey	
13	Win	10–2–1	Alain Bonnel	PTS	6	25 Oct 2008	Hotel de France, St Helier	
12	Win	9–2–1	Anthony Hanna	TKO	5 (6), 0:45	19 Sep 2008	Doncaster Dome, Doncaster, England	
11	Loss	8–2–1	Lee Haskins	PTS	8	28 Mar 2008	Metrodome, Barnsley, England	
10	Loss	8–1–1	Chris Edwards	SD	12	8 Dec 2007	Robin Park Arena, Wigan, England	For British super-flyweight title
9	Win	8–0–1	Nikita Lukin	PTS	8	21 Sep 2007	York Hall, London, England	
8	Win	7–0–1	Wayne Bloy	TKO	3 (10), 2:34	23 Feb 2007	Doncaster Dome, Doncaster, England	Won English bantamweight title
7	Win	6–0–1	Andy Bell	TKO	3 (6), 2:22	1 Dec 2006	Doncaster Dome, Doncaster, England	
6	Win	5–0–1	Wayne Bloy	PTS	4	13 Oct 2006	Doncaster Dome, Doncaster, England	
5	Draw	4–0–1	Dai Davies	PTS	4	9 Jun 2006	Doncaster Dome, Doncaster, England	
4	Win	4–0	Neil Marston	PTS	4	21 Apr 2006	Doncaster Dome, Doncaster, England	
3	Win	3–0	Gary Sheil	PTS	6	3 Mar 2006	Doncaster Dome, Doncaster, England	
2	Win	2–0	Delroy Spencer	PTS	6	2 Dec 2005	Doncaster Dome, Doncaster, England	
1	Win	1–0	Neil Read	PTS	6	16 Sep 2005	Doncaster Dome, Doncaster, England	

== See also ==
- List of bantamweight boxing champions

Sporting positions
Regional boxing titles
Preceded by Ian Napa	British bantamweight champion 22 January 2010 – 2010; Vacated	Vacant Title next held by Stuart Hall
Vacant Title last held by Jason Booth	Commonwealth bantamweight champion 22 January 2010 – 2012; Vacated	Vacant Title next held by Stuart Hall
Vacant Title last held by Malik Bouziane	European bantamweight champion 20 March 2010 – 2012; Vacated	Vacant Title next held by Lee Haskins
Preceded by Stuart Hall	British bantamweight champion 3 September 2011 – 2013; Vacated	Vacant Title next held by Lee Haskins
World boxing titles
Vacant Title last held by Léo Santa Cruz	IBF bantamweight champion 11 May 2013 – 18 October 2013; Stripped	Vacant Title next held by Stuart Hall
Vacant Title last held by Kōki Kameda	WBA bantamweight champion Regular title 31 May 2014 – 25 May 2018	Succeeded by Naoya Inoue
