= Chris Sanigar =

Personal information
- Nationality: British
- Born: 7 July 1955 (age 71)
- Height: 5 ft 9 in (175 cm)
- Weight: Light welterweight, welterweight

Boxing career
- Stance: Southpaw

Boxing record
- Total fights: 31
- Wins: 18
- Win by KO: 10
- Losses: 11
- Draws: 2

Chris Sanigar (born 7 July 1955) is a boxing manager, promoter, and trainer, and former boxer. In his career as a boxer he won the BBBofC Southern Area light welterweight title, and in his managerial career he has worked with several British and World champions.

== Career ==
Sanigar grew up in Bristol, and started his amateur career in 1974, reaching the ABA finals in 1977 and representing England three times.

He moved to London, where he was managed by George Francis, and turned professional in 1978, starting his pro career with a points win over Eric Purkis. After winning his first seven fights, he suffered successive defeats in 1979 to George McGurk and future Zambian champion Payson Choolwe. In June 1981 he challenged for his first professional title when he faced Sid Smith for the vacant BBBofC Southern Area light welterweight title; Sanigar was stopped with a cut in the third round. The two met again in November that year, this time with Sanigar knocking Smith out in the fourth round to take the title. In April 1982, Sanigar defended the title against Sylvester Mittee in a fight that was also an eliminator for the British title. Mittee stopped him in the ninth round. In October 1982, Sanigar faced Terry Marsh, losing via disqualification in the seventh round for hitting Marsh while he was down. Sanigar moved up a division in 1984 to face Rocky Kelly for the vacant Southern Area welterweight title, losing a narrow points decision. Sanigar subsequently retired from boxing.

He returned to Bristol and moved into training and management at Bristol Boxing Gym, home of his former club, Empire ABC. He received his manager and trainer's licence in 1989. Boxers he has managed (latterly along with his son Jamie) include Ross Hale, Dean Francis, Adrian Stone, Scott Dann, Glenn Catley, Jamie Arthur, Lee Haskins, Lee Selby, Andrew Selby, and Olympic silver medallist Fred Evans.

In October 2016, Sanigar received the Joe Bromley Award for Outstanding Services to Boxing at the Boxing Writers Club dinner.
