= Nicky Booth =

English boxer (1980–2021)

Personal information
- Nickname: 1 Smooth
- Born: 21 January 1980 Nottingham, England
- Died: 13 January 2021 (aged 40)
- Height: 5 ft 6 in (1.68 m)
- Weight: Bantamweight Fly Weight

Boxing career
- Reach: 68 in (173 cm)
- Stance: Orthodox

Boxing record
- Total fights: 23
- Wins: 17
- Win by KO: 7
- Losses: 5
- Draws: 1

Nicky Booth (21 January 1980 – 13 January 2021) was a British professional boxer who competed from 1998 to 2003. He challenged once for the IBO bantamweight title in 2001. At regional level, he held the British bantamweight title from 2000 to 2003 and the Commonwealth bantamweight title from 2000 to 2002. He was the younger brother of former boxer Jason Booth.

Booth died on 13 January 2021, at the age of 40.

== Professional boxing record ==
23 fights	17 wins	5 losses
By knockout	7	1
By decision	10	4
Draws	1	

No.	Result	Record	Opponent	Type	Round, time	Date	Location	Notes
23	Loss	17–5–1	Nathan Sting	UD	12	20 Sep 2003	Harvey Hadden Leisure Centre, Nottingham, England	For WBU bantamweight title
22	Win	17–4–1	James Yelland	PTS	12	28 Apr 2003	Harvey Hadden Leisure Centre, Nottingham, England	Retained British bantamweight title
21	Win	16–4–1	Sergey Tasimov	TKO	3 (6), 0:55	16 Nov 2002	Harvey Hadden Leisure Centre, Nottingham, England	
20	Loss	15–4–1	Steve Molitor	PTS	12	21 Sep 2002	Brentwood Centre, Brentwood, England	Lost Commonwealth bantamweight title
19	Win	15–3–1	Moses Kinyua	KO	5 (12), 2:34	27 Jul 2002	Harvey Hadden Leisure Centre, Nottingham, England	Retained Commonwealth bantamweight title
18	Win	14–3–1	Stephen Oates	TKO	7 (12), 1:42	23 Feb 2002	Harvey Hadden Leisure Centre, Nottingham, England	Retained British and Commonwealth bantamweight titles
17	Win	13–3–1	Jim Betts	TKO	7 (12), 0:43	15 Sep 2001	Harvey Hadden Leisure Centre, Nottingham, England	Retained British and Commonwealth bantamweight titles
16	Loss	12–3–1	Jose Sanjuanelo	TKO	9 (12), 1:39	14 Jul 2001	Wembley Conference Centre, London, England	For IBO bantamweight title
15	Win	12–2–1	Kevin Gerowski	TKO	4 (8), 1:34	11 Jun 2001	Harvey Hadden Leisure Centre, Nottingham, England	
14	Win	11–2–1	Ady Lewis	TKO	7 (12), 2:35	26 Feb 2001	Harvey Hadden LeisureCentre, Nottingham, England	Retained British and Commonwealth bantamweight titles
13	Win	10–2–1	Tommy Waite	PTS	12	9 Oct 2000	The O2 Arena, London, England	Won British and Commonwealth bantamweight titles
12	Win	9–2–1	Gary Ford	PTS	6	24 Sep 2000	Tara Leisure Centre, Shaw, England	
11	Win	8–2–1	Gareth Payne	PTS	4	22 May 2000	Skydome, Coventry, England	
10	Win	7–2–1	Shaun Anderson	PTS	6	3 Mar 2000	Volunteer Rooms, Irvine, Scotland	
9	Win	6–2–1	David Jeffrey	PTS	4	3 Dec 1999	Bushfield Leisure Centre, Peterborough, England	
8	Win	5–2–1	Russel Laing	PTS	8	20 Sep 1999	Forte Post House Hotel, Glasgow, Scotland	
7	Win	4–2–1	Delroy Spencer	PTS	4	6 Jun 1999	Manor House, West Bridgford, England	
6	Win	3–2–1	Delroy Spencer	PTS	6	30 Apr 1999	Wortley House Hotel, Scunthorpe, England	
5	Loss	2–2–1	Anthony Hanna	PTS	6	25 Nov 1998	Manor Park Country House, Clydach, Wales	
4	Draw	2–1–1	Anthony Hanna	PTS	6	11 Sep 1998	Winter Gardens, Cleethorpes, England	
3	Loss	2–1	Ian Napa	PTS	6	14 Jul 1998	Rivermead Leisure Centre, Reading, England	
2	Win	2–0	Marty Chestnut	PTS	6	15 May 1998	Clifton Leisure Centre, Nottingham, England	
1	Win	1–0	Shane Mallon	TKO	4 (6), 2:58	26 Feb 1998	Quality Royal Hotel, Hull, England	
