= Roy Hilton (boxer) =

English boxer

Roy Hilton is an English male retired boxer. He was the National Champion in 1973 after winning the Amateur Boxing Association British flyweight title, boxing out of the Repton ABC.

He represented England in the flyweight (-51 Kg) division, at the 1974 British Commonwealth Games in Christchurch, New Zealand.
