= Teddy Warwick =

British boxer

Personal information
- Nationality: British
- Born: 21 July 1904; Mile End, London, England
- Died: September 1986 (aged 82); Waltham Forest, London, England

Sport
- Sport: Boxing

Edward James Warwick (21 July 1904 – September 1986) was a British boxer. He competed in the men's flyweight event at the 1924 Summer Olympics and fought as Teddy Warwick.

Warwick won the 1923, 1924 and 1925 Amateur Boxing Association British flyweight title and the 1927 bantamweight title, when boxing out of the Columbia ABC.
