= Hamza Uddin =

English boxer (born 2003)

Personal information
- Nickname: The Great
- Nationality: English
- Born: 16 July 2003 (age 23)
- Height: 5 ft 7 in (170 cm)
- Weight: Flyweight

Boxing career
- Stance: Orthodox

Boxing record
- Total fights: 8
- Wins: 8
- Win by KO: 5

Hamza Uddin (born 16 July 2003) is an English professional boxer. He has held the British and Commonwealth flyweight titles since October 2026 and was previously English champion in the same weight division. As an amateur, Uddin was the youngest person to win two England Boxing National Elite Championships.

== Early life and amateur career ==
Brought up in Walsall and of a Bangladeshi heritage, Uddin's father Siraj was a boxer and was his inspiration for taking up the sport with his first bout coming at the age of 10.

He went on to win eight national amateur titles and was a member of Team GB. Uddin won the flyweight division at the England Boxing National Elite Championships in 2022 and 2023. Aged 19 when he won his second championship, he became the youngest two-time champion at the event.

== Professional career ==
Uddin turned professional in December 2023, signing a promotional contract with Eddie Hearn led Matchroom Boxing. He made his pro-debut at the Exhibition Centre in Liverpool on 27 April 2024, stopping Santiago San Eusebio in the third of their scheduled six-round contest.

Unbeaten in his first five paid fights, Uddin claimed the vacant English and WBA International flyweight titles with a fifth round stoppage win over Paul Roberts at Sheffield Arena on 11 October 2025. He knocked his opponent to the canvas three times before Roberts' corner threw in the towel to end the bout.

Uddin was then kept out of the competitive boxing ring for several months after having surgery on a long-standing hand injury, before returning to action with a second round stoppage win over Jemsi Kibazange in a non-title bout at bp pulse LIVE in Birmingham on 29 August 2026.

He challenged British flyweight champion Sean Bruce at the Utilita Arena in Birmingham on 3 October 2026 with the vacant Commonwealth flyweight title also on the line. Having floored the champion twice in the fifth round, Uddin won by technical knockout when the referee waved the fight off in the eighth round after Bruce was sent to the canvas for a third time.

== Professional boxing record ==
8 fights	8 wins	0 losses
By knockout	5	0
By decision	3	0

No.	Result	Record	Opponent	Type	Round, time	Date	Location	Notes
8	Win	8–0	Sean Bruce	TKO	8 (12), 2:49	3 Oct 2026	Utilita Arena, Birmingham, England	Won British and vacant Commonwealth flyweight titles
7	Win	7–0	Jemsi Kibazange	TKO	2 (6)	29 Aug 2026	bp Pulse LIVE, Birmingham, England	
6	Win	6–0	Paul Roberts	TKO	5 (10), 2:14	11 Oct 2025	Sheffield Arena, Sheffield, England	Won vacant English and WBA International flyweight titles
5	Win	5–0	Leandro Jose Blanc	TKO	7 (8), 0:37	21 Jun 2025	bp Pulse LIVE, Birmingham, England	
4	Win	4–0	Misael Ezequiel Graffioli	PTS	8	25 Jan 2025	Nottingham Arena, Nottingham, England	
3	Win	3–0	Benn Norman	PTS	6	30 Nov 2024	bp Pulse LIVE, Birmingham, England	
2	Win	2–0	Giulio Commerso	PTS	6	22 Jun 2024	bp pulse LIVE, Birmingham, England	
1	Win	1–0	Santiago San Eusebio	TKO	3 (6), 1:00	27 Apr 2024	Exhibition Centre, Liverpool, England	
