= Isaac Ward =

English boxer

Personal information
- Nickname: Argy
- Nationality: English
- Born: 7 April 1977 (age 49) Darlington, England
- Height: 5 ft 5 in (1.65 m)
- Weight: featherweight, and super bantamweight

Boxing career

Boxing record
- Total fights: 19
- Wins: 15 (KO 2)
- Losses: 2 (KO 2)
- Draws: 2

Isaac "Argy" Ward (born 7 April 1977) is an English amateur featherweight and professional super bantamweight boxer.

Ward was born in Darlington. As an amateur, he was runner-up for the 2000 Amateur Boxing Association of England (ABAE) featherweight title, against David Mullholland (Salisbury ABC), boxing out of Darlington ABC, and as a professional won the Commonwealth super bantamweight title. He was a challenger for the British Boxing Board of Control (BBBofC) British bantamweight title, against Martin Power.
