= List of British super-flyweight boxing champions =

List of British super-flyweight boxing champions is a table showing the boxers who have won the British super-flyweight title, which has been the British Boxing Board of Control (BBBoC) since 2007.

A champion will often voluntarily relinquish the title in order to fight for a higher-ranked championship, such as the world or European. Where the date on which a champion relinquished the title is unclear, the date of the last BBBoC sanctioned fight is shown.

^{r}–Champion relinquished title.

^{s}–Champion stripped of title.

| Name | Duration of reign | Defences |
|---|---|---|
| Chris Edwards | 8 December 2007 – 28 March 2008 | 1 |
| Andy Bell | 28 March 2008 – 7 November 2008 | 1 |
| Lee Haskins | 7 November 2008 – 11 December 2009^{r} | 2 |
| Paul Butler | 9 November 2012^{r} | 0 |
| Kal Yafai | 17 October 2015^{r} | 0 |
| Charlie Edwards | 15 April 2017^{r} | 0 |
| Sunny Edwards | 21 December 2019^{r} | 0 |
| Marcel Braithwaite | 20 October 2023^{r} | 0 |
| Brandon Daord | 8 February 2025 | 0 |

== See also ==
- List of British heavyweight boxing champions
- List of British cruiserweight boxing champions
- List of British light-heavyweight boxing champions
- List of British super-middleweight boxing champions
- List of British middleweight boxing champions
- List of British light-middleweight boxing champions
- List of British welterweight boxing champions
- List of British light-welterweight boxing champions
- List of British lightweight boxing champions
- List of British super-featherweight boxing champions
- List of British featherweight boxing champions
- List of British super-bantamweight boxing champions
- List of British bantamweight boxing champions
- List of British flyweight boxing champions
- List of British world boxing champions
