= Dale Robinson =

English boxer (born 1980)

Personal information
- Nationality: English
- Born: 9 April 1980 (age 46) Huddersfield, England
- Height: 5 ft 4 in (1.63 m)
- Weight: fly/super fly/bantam/super bantamweight

Boxing career

Boxing record
- Total fights: 24
- Wins: 19 (KO 9)
- Losses: 3 (KO 1)
- Draws: 2
- No contests: 0

Dale Robinson (born 9 April 1980) born in Huddersfield is an English amateur flyweight and professional fly/super fly/bantam/super bantamweight boxer of the 1990s and 2000s, who as an amateur won the 1999 Amateur Boxing Association of England (ABAE) flyweight title, against Anthony Joyett (West Ham ABC), boxing out of Hard and Fast ABC (Barnsley), and 2000 Amateur Boxing Association of England (ABAE) flyweight title, against D. Bennett (St. Mary's ABC), boxing out of Hard and Fast ABC (Barnsley), and as a professional won the British Boxing Board of Control (BBBofC) Central Area flyweight title, and Commonwealth flyweight title, drew with Chris Edwards for the vacant BBBofC British flyweight title, and vacant Commonwealth flyweight title, and was a challenger for the International Boxing Organization (IBO) super flyweight title against Jason Booth, BBBofC British bantamweight title against Martin Power, and BBBofC English flyweight title against Chris Edwards, his professional fighting weight varied from 110 3/4 lb (50.2 kg; 7 st 12.8 lb), i.e. flyweight to 120 lb (54.4 kg; 8 st 8.0 lb), i.e. super bantamweight. Dale Robinson was trained by Chris Aston, and managed by Tommy Gilmour.
