= Yaqub Kareem =

Nigerian boxer

Personal information
- Nationality: Nigerian
- Born: Yakuba Karim Lagos, Nigeria
- Weight: super fly/bantam/super bantamweight

Boxing career
- Stance: Orthodox

Boxing record
- Total fights: 26
- Wins: 14 (KO 8)
- Losses: 11 (KO 9)
- Draws: 1

Yaqub Kareem (born in Lagos) is a Nigerian professional super fly/bantam/super bantamweight boxer of the 2000s and 2010s who won the Commonwealth super flyweight title, his professional fighting weight varied from 113 lb (51 kg; 8 st 1 lb), i.e. super flyweight to 119 lb (54 kg; 8 st 7 lb), i.e. super bantamweight.
