= Tshifhiwa Munyai =

South African boxer

Personal information
- Nickname: Atomic Spider
- Nationality: South African
- Born: 8 May 1985 (age 41) South Africa
- Weight: Bantamweight; Super-bantamweight; Featherweight; Lightweight

Boxing career
- Stance: Orthodox

Boxing record
- Total fights: 41
- Wins: 34
- Win by KO: 20
- Losses: 6
- Draws: 1

Tshifhiwa Munyai (born 8 May 1985) is a South African professional boxer who challenged for the WBA super-bantamweight title in 2014. He also held the Commonwealth bantamweight title from 2006 to 2007, and the IBO super-bantamweight title in 2011.

== Professional career ==
=== Early career ===
Munyai spent the early part of his career boxing in the townships of his native country South Africa. He had compiled a record of 10-0-1 by the time he left the country to box abroad for the first time as a professional.

His big opportunity came when he was given the opportunity in June 2006 to fight England's Martin Power for the vacant Commonwealth bantamweight title. Power came into the contest with an undefeated record of 19-0 and was the holder of the British bantamweight title at the time. Munyai stunned the boxing world by beating Power with a 9th-round TKO in London's York Hall.

=== Commonwealth champion ===
Following his victory Munyai returned to the York Hall to defend against former Commonwealth Flyweight champion Lee Haskins. He won the contest in the 6th round when referee Micky Vann stepped in stop the contest after Haskins came off worst after being caught with a number of body shots. In January 2007 Munyai once again met Martin Power this time at the Goresbrook Leisure Center in Dagenham. This time the victory was emphatic with Munyai winning four one sided rounds before Power was pulled by his corner in the fourth. Power claimed in an interview with the BBC that an elbow injury had hampered his performance saying "I picked up an elbow injury after the second round and it was restricting me. It was hard enough to fight him with two hands, but with just one I was struggling. I wanted to carry on but my corner wouldn't let me." A confident Munyai said simply "I knew from the first fight that I could beat him and, if anything, this fight was even easier for me."

=== WBA Inter-Continental champion ===
Following his victories Munyai fought twice more in the UK and moved up to featherweight with 8 round wins over Harry Ramogoadi and Abdul Tebazalwa before returning to South Africa as a bantamweight. In February 2008 he challenged the Argentinian Julio David Roque Ler for the WBA Inter-continental bantamweight title in Bloemfontein and came out a unanimous points winner. In July 2008, Munyai returned to the UK and to the Goresbrook Leisure Centre the scene of his second victory over Power. Returning featherweight he suffered his first defeat as a professional losing to the Ghanaian boxer Osumana Akaba over 8 rounds. After the fight Akaba responded to comments that he had just been there to make up the numbers saying “I know that people didn't rate my record and thought they were going to use me as a stepping stone, just as a journeyman. I knew going into the fight that he'd beaten a lot of good people, but they were afraid of him.”

Munyai returned to action back in South Africa in November 2008 and defeated fellow countryman Bongani Mahangu in a return to bantamweight. The fight was the first defence of Munyai's WBA intercontinental title and ended with a split decision win over Maglangu who at the time was also the WBA Pan African bantamweight title holder. Munyai next boxed in July 2009 and in a non-title fight defeated Galley Cudjoe with a first round stoppage in Johannesburg.

He made the second defence of his intercontinental title on 27 February 2010 defeating the Philippines Daniel Ferreras at the Kempton Park in Gauteng over 12 rounds. On 28 July 2010 he stopped Ghanaian Prosper Ankrah in the 3rd round of another non-title fight at the Emperor's Palace and then just a week later on 8 August 2010 found himself in the frame for a trip to Mexico City and a shot at the vacant WBC Silver bantamweight against Mexico's Cristian Esquivel. Despite the shot at the title coming at short notice Munyai traveled to Mexico and went the full 12 round distance although ended up losing for the second time in his career.

=== IBO super-bantamweight champion ===
On 26 March 2011 Munyai fought Philippine boxer Danilo Pena at the Kempton Park winning on all the judges scorecards to win the vacant IBO super bantamweight championship.

== Professional boxing record ==
| 41 fights | 34 wins | 6 losses |
|---|---|---|
| By knockout | 20 | 3 |
| By decision | 14 | 3 |
| Draws | 1 | |

| No. | Result | Record | Opponent | Type | Round, time | Date | Location | Notes |
|---|---|---|---|---|---|---|---|---|
| 41 | Win | 34–6–1 | (South Africa) Sanele Msimang | KO | 4 (12) | Oct 31, 2021 | Booysens Boxing Club, Johannesburg, South Africa | Retained South African lightweight title |
| 40 | Win | 33–6–1 | (South Africa) Khaya Busakwe | TKO | 9 (12), 1:01 | May 28, 2021 | Sandton Convention Center, Johannesburg, South Africa | Retained South African lightweight title |
| 39 | Win | 32–6–1 | (South Africa) Siphosethu Mvula | UD | 12 | Mar 15, 2020 | Blairgowrie Recreation Centre, Randburg, South Africa | Won vacant South African lightweight title |
| 38 | Win | 31–6–1 | (South Africa) Kabelo Bikitsha | PTS | 8 | Dec 27, 2019 | 2Ten Hotel, Thohoyandou, South Africa | |
| 37 | Win | 30–6–1 | (Malawi) Osgood Kayuni | TKO | 4 (8) | Mar 31, 2019 | Blairgowrie Recreation Centre, Randburg, South Africa | |
| 36 | Win | 29–6–1 | (Malawi) Crispin Moliati | KO | 4 (8) | Dec 28, 2018 | 2Ten Hotel, Thohoyandou, South Africa | |
| 35 | Loss | 28–6–1 | (South Africa) Rofhiwa Maemu | TKO | 7 (10) | Dec 29, 2017 | 2Ten Hotel, Thohoyandou, South Africa | |
| 34 | Loss | 28–5–1 | (South Africa) Azinga Fuzile | TKO | 3 (10), 2:41 | Oct 21, 2017 | Emperors Palace, Kempton Park, South Africa | |
| 33 | Win | 28–4–1 | (Namibia) Samuel Kapapu | TKO | 3 (8) | Apr 28, 2017 | Wembley Indoor Arena, Johannesburg, South Africa | |
| 32 | Win | 27–4–1 | (South Africa) Oscar Chauke | KO | 10 (12), 1:46 | Sep 12, 2015 | (United Kingdom) Evoque Nightclub, Preston, England | |
| 31 | Win | 26–4–1 | (Nicaragua) Reynaldo Cajina | TKO | 9 (10) | Jun 13, 2015 | (United Kingdom) Evoque Nightclub, Preston, England | |
| 30 | Win | 25–4–1 | (Georgia (country)) Giorgi Gachechiladze | KO | 4 (6), 2:36 | Apr 18, 2015 | (United Kingdom) Sports Centre, Oldham, England | |
| 29 | Loss | 24–4–1 | (Namibia) Paulus Ambunda | SD | 12 | Dec 20, 2014 | Helao Nafidi, Oshikango, Namibia | |
| 28 | Loss | 24–3–1 | (United Kingdom) Scott Quigg | TKO | 2 (12), 1:56 | Apr 19, 2014 | (United Kingdom) Manchester Arena, Manchester, England | For WBA super-bantamweight title |
| 27 | Win | 24–2–1 | (South Africa) Phumzile Matyhila | TKO | 8 (10) | Sep 21, 2013 | Indoor Centre, Mdantsane, South Africa | |
| 26 | Win | 23–2–1 | (Ghana) Emmanuel Quartey | TKO | 11 (12), 2:50 | Jun 1, 2013 | Kati Kati Hall, Cathcart, South Africa | Retained WBA Pan African bantamweight title |
| 25 | Win | 22–2–1 | (South Africa) Oscar Chauke | UD | 12 | Dec 8, 2012 | Orient Theatre, East London, South Africa | Won vacant WBA Pan African bantamweight title |
| 24 | Win | 21–2–1 | (Philippines) Danilo Pena | UD | 12 | Mar 26, 2011 | Emperors Palace, Kempton Park, South Africa | Won vacant IBO super-bantamweight title |
| 23 | Loss | 20–2–1 | (Mexico) Christian Esquivel | UD | 12 | Aug 7, 2010 | Arena México, Mexico City, Mexico | For vacant WBC Silver bantamweight title |
| 22 | Win | 20–1–1 | (Ghana) Prosper Ankrah | KO | 3 (10), 1:44 | Jul 28, 2010 | Emperors Palace, Kempton Park, South Africa | |
| 21 | Win | 19–1–1 | (Philippines) Daniel Ferreras | UD | 12 | Feb 27, 2010 | Emperors Palace, Kempton Park, South Africa | Retained WBA Inter-Continental bantamweight title |
| 20 | Win | 18–1–1 | (Ghana) Galley Cudjoe | TKO | 1 (10), 2:28 | Jul 31, 2009 | Nasrec Indoor Arena, Johannesburg, South Africa | |
| 19 | Win | 17–1–1 | (South Africa) Bongani Mahlangu | SD | 12 | Nov 14, 2008 | Ride Hall, Parys, South Africa | Retained WBA Inter-Continental bantamweight title |
| 18 | Loss | 16–1–1 | (Ghana) Osumanu Akaba | PTS | 8 | Jul 18, 2008 | (United Kingdom) Goresbrook Leisure Centre, Dagenham, England | |
| 17 | Win | 16–0–1 | (Argentina) Julio David Roque Ler | UD | 12 | Feb 23, 2008 | Town Hall, Bloemfontein, South Africa | Won vacant WBA Inter-Continental bantamweight title |
| 16 | Win | 15–0–1 | (Uganda) Abdul Tebazalwa | PTS | 8 | Nov 30, 2007 | (United Kingdom) Leisure Center, Newham, England | |
| 15 | Win | 14–0–1 | (South Africa) Harry Ramogoadi | PTS | 8 | Jun 15, 2007 | (United Kingdom) National Sports Centre, Crystal Palace, England | |
| 14 | Win | 13–0–1 | (United Kingdom) Martin Power | RTD | 4 (12), 3:00 | Jan 26, 2007 | (United Kingdom) Goresbrook Leisure Centre, Dagenham, England | Retained Commonwealth bantamweight title |
| 13 | Win | 12–0–1 | (United Kingdom) Lee Haskins | TKO | 6 (12), 2:56 | Oct 6, 2006 | (United Kingdom) York Hall, London, England | Retained Commonwealth bantamweight title |
| 12 | Win | 11–0–1 | (United Kingdom) Martin Power | TKO | 9 (12), 1:39 | Jun 6, 2006 | (United Kingdom) York Hall, London, England | Won vacant Commonwealth bantamweight title |
| 11 | Win | 10–0–1 | (South Africa) Lungisa Dlamini | UD | 6 | May 26, 2006 | Nasrec Indoor Arena, Johannesburg, South Africa | |
| 10 | Win | 9–0–1 | (South Africa) Nkosinathi Tshinavhe | PTS | 10 | Feb 11, 2006 | Multi-Purpose Centre, Makhado, South Africa | Won vacant Limpopo bantamweight title |
| 9 | Win | 8–0–1 | (South Africa) Goodman Mavuso | TKO | 2 (6) | Oct 7, 2005 | Nasrec Indoor Arena, Johannesburg, South Africa | |
| 8 | Win | 7–0–1 | (South Africa) Nkosana Vaaltein | PTS | 6 | Jul 29, 2005 | Nasrec Indoor Arena, Johannesburg, South Africa | |
| 7 | Win | 6–0–1 | (South Africa) Clement Somers | TKO | 1 (6) | Jul 3, 2005 | Westgate Shopping Mall, Roodepoort, South Africa | |
| 6 | Win | 5–0–1 | (South Africa) Kingsley Ndouvhada | TKO | 1 (6) | May 27, 2005 | Orlando Community Hall, Soweto, South Africa | |
| 5 | Draw | 4–0–1 | (South Africa) Peter Ndou | PTS | 4 | Feb 4, 2005 | Graceland Hotel Casino, Secunda, South Africa | |
| 4 | Win | 4–0 | (South Africa) Fikile Mlonyeni | KO | 3 (4) | Jul 17, 2004 | Highgate Shopping Mall, Johannesburg, South Africa | |
| 3 | Win | 3–0 | (South Africa) Tladi Modibeli | UD | 4 | Jun 16, 2004 | Sports Centre, Cullinan, South Africa | |
| 2 | Win | 2–0 | (South Africa) Tladi Modibeli | UD | 4 | Feb 7, 2004 | Carnival City Casino, Brakpan, South Africa | |
| 1 | Win | 1–0 | (South Africa) Zukile Toko | TKO | 2 (4) | Dec 6, 2003 | Southern Suburbs Recreation Cent, Johannesburg, South Africa | |

== Titles in boxing ==
- Commonwealth Bantamweight title
- WBA Inter-Continental Bantamweight title
- WBA Pan African Bantamweight title
