= Jason Booth =

British boxer (born 1977)

Personal information
- Nickname: Too Smooth
- Nationality: British
- Born: 7 November 1977 (age 49) Nottingham, England
- Height: 5 ft 4 in (163 cm)
- Weight: Flyweight; Super-flyweight; Bantamweight; Super-bantamweight

Boxing career
- Stance: Orthodox

Boxing record
- Total fights: 53
- Wins: 38
- Win by KO: 15
- Losses: 15

Jason Booth (born 7 November 1977) is a British former professional boxer who competed from 1996 to 2016. He held the IBO super-flyweight title from 2003 to 2004, and challenged once for the IBF super bantamweight title in 2010. At regional level, he held the British and Commonwealth flyweight titles between 1999 and 2001; the Commonwealth bantamweight title from 2007 to 2008; the British super-bantamweight title from 2009 to 2011; the Commonwealth super-bantamweight title twice in 2010 and 2011. He is the older brother of the former British and Commonwealth bantamweight champion, Nicky Booth.

== Professional boxing career ==
=== Flyweight and super-flyweight ===
Booth started his professional career in June 1996 with a third round win over Darren Noble at the Pinegrove Country Club in Sheffield. By March 1998 he had compiled an unbeaten record of 10–0 and had earned an eliminating fight for the British flyweight title against Louis Veitch, it was a fight he won by knocking out Veitch in the second round. Three more fights and three more wins followed including another victory over Veitch and a win over the unbeaten Bulgarian Dimitar Alipiev before the opportunity arose to fight for the European flyweight title. Booth was now 14–0 and travelled to France to take on reigning champion David Guerault himself only 15–0. It proved to be Booth's first defeat as the champion won a 12-round decision.

==== British and Commonwealth champion ====
Booth followed up his first career defeat with victory back at home beating Mark Reynolds in Coventry before getting a fight with the current holder of the British and Commonwealth flyweight titles Keith Knox. The fight due to take place in Belfast on 16 October 1999 would have both titles on the line with Booth eventually winning in the 10th round. The new champion defended his Commonwealth title first when in January 2000 he beat South African Abbey Mnisi. In November 2000 he put both titles on the line when defending against 8–0 prospect Ian Napa eventually winning a 12-round unanimous decision. In February 2001, he made the second defence of his Commonwealth belt knocking out the Zimbabwean Nokuthula Tshabangu at the Harvey Hadden Leisure Centre in Nottingham. Booth's brother, Nicky, was also on the bill and defeated Adey Lewis with a seventh round stoppage to crown a good night for the brothers and a unique one in British boxing history in that it was the first time that two siblings had defended titles on the same night.

==== European and World challenges ====
His next fight saw Booth, who now had a record of 20–1 challenge once again for the European flyweight title. This time the opponent was Russian Alexander Mahmutov and the fight was to be in the Spanish capital Madrid. Booth's second career defeat once again came when challenging for European honours losing the bout again on points over 12 rounds. Booth was hoping to make it third time lucky when in June 2001 he challenged once again for the title. Mahmutov had vacated and the vacant title was up for grabs with Booth travelling back to France to face Mimoun Chent. The dream was not to be realised however when the fight was stopped in the seventh round due to a series of nasty cuts around the Frenchman's eyes, Booth ended up losing on a technical decision.

Two more non-title fights back in the United Kingdom saw Booth get back to winning ways with two more wins before, in September 2003, re-entering the championship frame. The title on the line was the IBO super-flyweight title held by South African Lunga Ntontela. The fight saw Booth put down in the seventh round but still ended with a win for the British man after claiming a split decision victory. A defence in March 2004 saw him beat Huddersfield based Dale Robinson before losing the title in December 2004 to Northern Ireland's Damaen Kelly himself a former European champion.

Following the loss of his IBO belt, Booth spent almost two years away from the ring as he struggled with addiction. Booth spent all of his earnings on a combination of alcohol and drugs. The suicide of his sister Deana years prior had triggered his alcoholism. Eventually, he checked into a rehabilitation clinic and began training once more with trainer Tony Harris.

=== Bantamweight ===
==== Commonwealth champion ====
Booth made his comeback on 3 November 2006 moving up to bantamweight with a win over journeyman Abdul Mghrbel at the Barnsley Metrodome almost two years since his defeat to Kelly. He followed this up in February 2007 with a win against Jamil Hussain and then on 6 July 2007 stepped into the ring with former opponent Ian Napa to challenge for the British bantamweight title. The fight at the Robin Park Centre in Wigan saw Napa gain revenge for his defeat in 2000 with a 12-round points victory. The same venue would prove to be the location for his next fight as Booth returned on 8 December 2007 to defeat Welsh prospect Matthew Edmonds for the Commonwealth title. The win over Edmonds meant that Jason Booth could now claim to be a two weight Commonwealth champion. He defended his new title on 7 March 2008, against Ghana's Lante Addy, and won a non-title bout against Dai Davies in June 2008. He made a second defence on 18 December 2008 with Dublin being the location for a challenge from Pontefract-based fighter Sean Hughes. Booth won the fight in the 10th round following a corner retirement from Hughes. After the fight with Hughes, Booth said that he "didn't realise how well I boxed" and would now like a rematch with Ian Napa as they had "unfinished business."

=== Super-bantamweight ===
==== Two weight British champion ====
On 17 April 2009, Booth won the vacant British super-bantamweight title with a victory over English champion Mark Moran. Booth had been meant to fight Lee Haskins for the British super-flyweight title before Haskins pulled out with a hand injury. Moran was originally scheduled to fight Matthew Marsh for the super-bantamweight title before Marsh pulled out citing difficulties in making the weight. Booth won the fight when a clash of heads forced the fight to be stopped on cuts in the sixth round although he had been dominating the fight prior to the stoppage. The victory meant that Booth had become a two-weight British champion having also won the flyweight title in 1999. On 30 June 2009 Booth made the first defence of his new title against Thetford fighter Rocky Dean winning a unanimous points decision. Promoter Frank Maloney said after the fight that he would try to get Booth a world title fight in the near future.

Booths second defence of the title took place in Sunderland and saw him headline the bill against Hartlepool fighter Michael Hunter, a former holder of the belt and European champion at the weight. Booth was able to dominate the fight from the bell and Hunter made the decision not to come out for the 5th round handing victory to the champion. Booth's third defence of the title was against another former champion in Matthew Marsh. Marsh had vacated the title with the intention of taking a break from the sport and upon his return had won two contests. For Booth, a win over Marsh would mean the Lonsdale Belt would be his for keeps after making three successful defences. The fight, in Nottingham on 5 February 2010, resulted in a stoppage decision for Booth despite being knocked down in the 5th round when the fight was called off in the 11th round following a severe gash to Marsh's eye. The win not only meant the Lonsdale belt but also the vacant Commonwealth title, which was also on the line, would be held by Booth meaning that Booth had now won the Commonwealth title at three different weights.

==== IBF super-bantamweight title attempt ====
Following his success in the ring, Booth managed to secure a shot against IBF super-bantamweight champion Steve Molitor, a two-time holder of the title. Molitor had initially won the title for the first time with a win over former Booth opponent Michael Hunter on 10 November 2006 defending five times before losing Celestino Caballero in Ontario on 21 November 2008. He regained the title on 27 March 2010 beating South African Takalani Ndlovu and the fight with Booth due to take place in the North of England would be his first defence. Molitor had also held the Commonwealth bantamweight title earlier in his career, defeating Jason's brother Nicky Booth on 21 November 2002 to lift the belt meaning that Moiltor would have eventually fought both brothers. Speaking about his career to date when announcing the fight, Booth paid tribute to the sport and reflected on how his life might have turned out: "If I hadn't had boxing, I'd be dead, the drink would have beaten me. I've got my kids now, they're my focus and I think I've just grown up". In the end, on 11 September 2010 in Sunderland, Booth lost a majority decision to the Canadian with two judges scoring 116–113 and 116–112 to Molitor with the third scoring the fight a draw at 114–114. After the fight Booth stated that his new ambition was to win the European title after coming up short on three occasions so far in his career saying that he would relish a shot at the new champion Kiko Martinez.

==== Unification and European title fights ====
On 5 February 2011 Booth retained his British title for the fourth time and retained his old Commonwealth title. His opponent, Jamie Arthur, had won the vacant belt beating Kris Hughes after Booth had given it up in order to fight for the World title. The fight, at the Brentwood Leisure Centre, resulted in a split decision win with both fighters suffering cuts during the fight. Speaking after the fight, Booth's manager Jimmy Gill said that the fight had only been arranged with three weeks' notice and said that Jason had only just come back from holiday and so had little time to prepare. Gill said, "Jason is 34 in November and small guys like him don't normally last that long. They burn out". He added that he would never allow Booth to take a fight at such short notice again, saying, "That was a favour to promoter Frank Maloney...It was a big ask but he pulled it off...But it was a one-off, I'll never do it again." Of the fight, Booth paid tribute to Arthur, saying, "That was the hardest fight I've had yet...I had to show heart because I was getting out-foxed by a clever champ. For saying we had three weeks' notice, we put on a good show." Following the fight, it was confirmed that Booth would challenge Spain's Kiko Martínez for the European super-bantamweight title, the fourth time Booth would have fought for a variation of the European belt. The fight against Martínez was eventually confirmed for Spain and took place on 15 April 2011 in front of a sell out 30,000 crowd in the city of Madrid. Martínez, a former two time European champion, won the fight in front of his home fans when in the tenth round a left hook was catalyst for the referee to call off the fight early, the first time Booth had been stopped in his career to date.

==== Loss of British title ====
Booth finally lost his British title in his next fight on 22 October 2011 suffering a 7th round defeat against Scott Quigg at the Reebok Stadium in Bolton. Quigg called the victory "the best night of my career so far" adding "I couldn’t believe how everything went perfectly".

==== Final fight ====
In what proved to be the last fight of his career, Booth faced Sean Davis for the vacant English super-bantamweight title at The Venue in Edgbaston on 27 February 2016. He lost via unanimous decision.

Sporting positions
Regional boxing titles
Preceded by Keith Knox	Commonwealth flyweight champion 16 October 1999 – 2002	Vacant Title next held by Dale Robinson
Preceded by Keith Knox	British flyweight champion 16 October 1999 – 2002	Vacant Title next held by Chris Edwards
Vacant Title last held by Tshifhiwa Munyai	Commonwealth bantamweight champion 8 December 2007 – 22 January 2010; Vacated	Vacant Title next held by Jamie McDonnell
Vacant Title last held by Matthew Marsh	British super-bantamweight champion 17 April 2009 – 22 October 2011	Succeeded by Scott Quigg
Vacant Title last held by Rendall Munroe	Commonwealth super-bantamweight champion 5 February 2010 – 16 October 2010	Vacant Title next held by Jamie Arthur
Preceded by Jamie Arthur	Commonwealth super-bantamweight champion 5 February 2011 – September 2011	Vacant Title next held by Carl Frampton
World boxing titles
Preceded by Lunga Ntontela	IBO super-flyweight champion 20 September 2003 – 17 December 2004	Succeeded by Damaen Kelly
