= Don Broadhurst =

British boxer

Personal information
- Nickname: The Don
- Nationality: British
- Born: 2 February 1984 (age 42) Birmingham, United Kingdom
- Weight: Flyweight

Boxing career
- Stance: Orthodox

Boxing record
- Total fights: 25
- Wins: 20
- Win by KO: 4
- Losses: 4
- Draws: 1

Don Broadhurst
Medal record

Boxing

Representing England

Commonwealth Games
Gold medal – first place	Melbourne 2006	Flyweight

EU Amateur Championships
Bronze medal – third place	2005 Cagliari	Flyweight

Don Gareth Broadhurst is a retired English professional boxer who competed in the Flyweight division. He hails from Birmingham and boxed for Frank Warren's Sports Network. He held the Commonwealth super flyweight champion from 31 October 2008 to 11 December 2009.

== Amateur career ==
Broadhurst was a standout amateur who won the Flyweight ABA championship in 2003 and Gold for England in the 2006 Commonwealth Games. He defeated South Africa's Jackson Van Chauke in the final of the games and was the first of five boxers to win gold for England that day. The fight lasted into the 3rd round when it was stopped on the 'outscored' rule.

== Early Professional career ==
Don decided to turn pro in June 2006 and signed for Sports Network saying “I feel the time is right to turn professional. I have represented England and the UK as an amateur, and they were the greatest times of my life, part of me wants to go to the Olympics still, but I'm positive now is the time, and I can go on to better my amateur achievements as a pro”. His first fight was 3 months later when he defeated journeyman Delroy Spencer at the Reebok Stadium in Bolton. In June 2008 he fought in his home city of Birmingham for the first time beating Frenchman Alain Bonnel on points over six rounds. it was also the first time he had fought in the whole of 2008 following a string of cancelled bouts.

== Commonwealth Champion ==
Despite not fighting regularly in 2008, Broadhurst still managed to win his first professional title in October. Fighting in his home town of Birmingham once more he headlined a bill that saw him win the vacant Commonwealth super flyweight crown. The opponent in the other corner was Isaac Quaye of Ghana with Broadhurst winning a unanimous decision over 12 rounds. The win meant that he had now won the Commonwealth title as an amateur and as a professional. Despite this fact the bill itself at the Aston Villa Leisure Centre will no doubt be more remembered for Broadhurst's compatriot Peter Buckley, the journeyman, winning in his 300th and last bout. Broadhurst made the first defence of his title in March 2009 at the National Indoor Arena in Birmingham defeating another boxer from Ghana, Isaac Owusu in the 11th round. On 24 April Broadhurst fought his third Ghanaian boxer in a row with a 6th round stoppage of Asamoah Wilson for his second title defence.

=== Unification bout with Haskins ===
On 11 December 2009 after 11 straight wins and two defences of his belt Broadhurst lost to reigning British super flyweight champion Lee Haskins in a unification clash. The fight, in Newport Wales, saw Haskins become a double champion after scoring a unanimous decision over 12 scrappy rounds. Speaking of his disappointment at having lost for the first time Broadhurst claimed that it was "one bad night" told Boxing News "I just stayed in my bed, depressed. It was one of the worst things that has ever happened to me, it was like a family member had died or something – that is how bad it was".

=== Defeat to Ali ===
Broadhurst didn't return to the ring until 18 September 2010 when he hoped that an appearance on Frank Warrens 'Magnificent Seven' event held at the LG Arena in Birmingham would re-ignite his career. It was not to be however as he lost for the second time in a row, this time to Najah Ali a fighter who had fought only five professional contests. The contest was fought at bantamweight which was above Broadhursts natural weight but the loss to Ali by two rounds was bitterly disappointing for the local man.

Preceded by New title	Commonwealth Super Flyweight Champion; 31 October 2008 – 11 December 2009	Succeeded by Lee Haskins
