= Gary Davies (boxer) =

British boxer (born 1982)

Personal information
- Nationality: British
- Born: Gary Harding; 17 October 1982 (age 44) St Helens, Merseyside, England
- Height: 5 ft 6 in (1.68 m)
- Weight: Bantamweight; Super bantamweight

Boxing career
- Stance: Orthodox

Boxing record
- Total fights: 17
- Wins: 12
- Win by KO: 8
- Losses: 4
- Draws: 1

Gary Davies (born Gary Harding, 17 October 1982) is a British former professional boxer who competed from 2002 to 2012. He held the British bantamweight title in 2009.

== Boxing career ==
=== Early professional career ===
Davies boxing career began on 1 June 2002, at the M.E.N. Arena when he was defeated by journeyman Steve Gethin by technical knock-out in the second round. His second fight on 5 October 2002, against Jason Thomas resulted in a first win and the year was topped off with a victory against Simon Chambers at the Liverpool Olympia. Davies did not fight at all in 2003 and in 2004 only fought once, winning against Furhan Rafiq. One more solitary fight in 2005 resulted in a second career loss for him, stopped in the fourth round at York Hall by Rocky Dean.

On 24 February 2006, Davies travelled to Scarborough and stopped Chris Hooper in the first round to win the Central Area super bantamweight belt, his first professional title. Despite never defending the title, Davies embarked upon a five fight unbeaten run. The run which included a draw against Barrington Brown and a second round stoppage of former British bantamweight champion Martin Power, resulted in Davies being given a shot at the full British title on 3 April 2009.

=== British champion ===
His opponent for the vacant championship was Welshman, Matthew Edmonds at York Hall. Edmonds came into the contest with a record of 10–2 against Davies 8-2-1.. The title had been vacated by Ian Napa following a victory over Carmelo Ballone which saw him lift the European title. Davies eventually defeated Edmonds after knocking him down three times in the seventh round. The fight was televised on Friday Fight Night on Sky Sports. Davies lost the belt in his very first defence against former champion Ian Napa. Despite a close fight, Napa's experience fighting at championship level won the day with Davies cornermen left ruing mistakes made in the last two rounds of the fight which were to prove pivotal.

=== Comeback ===
On 19 March 2010, Davies returned to the ring and defeated another former British champion in Andy Bell. Bell, a former champion down at super flyweight level, was coming off a period of inactivity and a loss to unbeaten Paul Edwards. The fight did not hear the bell at the end of the first round, when following two knockdowns the referee ruled it off handing victory to Davies.

Preceded by Ian Napa vacated	British Bantamweight title 3 April 2009 – 23 October 2009; L PTS 12	Succeeded by Ian Napa
