= Ian Napa =

Zimbabwean boxer

Personal information
- Nickname: Dappa
- Nationality: British; Zimbabwean
- Born: Ian Napa; 14 March 1978 (age 48) Rhodesia (now Zimbabwe)
- Height: 5 ft 1 in (155 cm)
- Weight: Flyweight; Bantamweight; Super bantamweight

Boxing career
- Reach: 62 in (157 cm)
- Stance: Orthodox

Boxing record
- Total fights: 29
- Wins: 19
- Win by KO: 1
- Losses: 10

Ian Napa (born 14 March 1978) is a Zimbabwean born British former professional boxer originally. He held the British bantamweight title twice between 2007 and 2012, and the EBU European bantamweight title from 2008 to 2009.

== Early professional career ==
Napa's early career started brightly enough when he won his first eight bouts in a row. That run was to end in November 2000, when he fought Jason Booth, who at the time was the British and Commonwealth flyweight Champion. The step up in class was too much and Napa lost a points decision. It was not the first time that Napa was to be disappointed when competing for the big prizes, two fights later he found himself competing for the WBU flyweight title losing this time on points to Peter Culshaw.

After that it seemed that every time Napa stepped up in class he would come out on the wrong side of a points defeat. Since the Culshaw loss in June 2001 Napa fought and lost against Marc Callaghan (Southern Area super bantamweight title), Martin Power (British Bantamweight title), Damaen Kelly and Simone Maludrottu (European Bantamweight title).

== The British title and the Lonsdale belt ==
Napa won the British title in July 2006, when he boxed a return against former conqueror Jason Booth. The fight took place at the Robin Park Center, Wigan and ended with a points victory over 12 rounds for Napa. He has defended the title there times against Lee Haskins, Martin Power and Colin Moffett. The third defence was voluntary and allowed Napa to pick up the prestigious Lonsdale belt for keeps.

== European champion ==
Having proved himself at domestic level, Napa set his sights at another shot for the European belt against reigning champion Carmelo Ballone. Speaking before the fight Napa said "This is my second chance with home advantage for the Euro crown and I'll get it right. I've seen a couple tapes of Ballone and I think I'm too slick...Losing is something I cannot think about. There are some good British fighters, but I now believe I am above domestic level." Napa was as good as his word winning in October 2008, a majority decision verdict over the Belgian after coming on strong in the latter part of the fight and putting Ballone down in the 10th round. Speaking after the fight Napa said "I've put so much hard work in and I thank my team for this victory...I deserve this, all my hard work has finally paid off. Words cannot explain how I feel." Unfortunately for Napa his hold on the title was to prove short lived when in March 2009 he lost a unanimous decision in his first defence against Frenchman Malik Bouziane.

== Two time British champion ==
Napa returned immediately to championship action in his next fight, travelling to Liverpool to fight for his old British title against St Helens Gary Davies. Davies had won the vacant belt after it had been vacated by Napa prior to fighting for the European title. The fight on 23 October 2009, resulted in Napa regaining the title with a majority decision. On 22 January 2010, Napa defended the title against Jamie McDonnell only to lose a split decision verdict to the man from Doncaster. McDonnell would go on to win the European title in his next fight and so chose to vacate the belt. This meant that Napa was able to fight for the vacant British title on 4 June 2010 only to end up retiring at the end of the eighth round against roofer Stuart Hall, a man contesting only his ninth professional fight. Despite coming on strong in the eighth round and being ahead on all the judges scorecards Napa claimed that the heat in the hall had affected him and that he'd struggled to make the bantamweight limit.

Preceded by Martin Power	British Bantamweight Champion; July 6, 2007–April 3, 2009	Succeeded by Gary Davies
Preceded by Carmelo Ballone	European Bantamweight Champion; October 17, 2008–March 20, 2009	Succeeded by Malik Bouziane
Preceded by Gary Davies	British Bantamweight Champion; October 23, 2009–January 22, 2010	Succeeded by Jamie McDonnell
