= Martin Power =

English boxer

Personal information
- Nickname: Too Much
- Nationality: British
- Born: Martin Power; 14 February 1980 (age 46) London, England
- Weight: Bantamweight

Boxing career
- Stance: Orthodox

Boxing record
- Total fights: 29
- Wins: 22
- Win by KO: 10
- Losses: 7

Martin Power (born 14 February 1980) is a British former professional boxer who competed from 2001 to 2012. He held the British bantamweight title from 2005 to 2006 and challenged twice for the Commonwealth bantamweight title in 2006 and 2007.

== Early Professional Career ==
Power made his professional debut in June 2001 with a victory over Sean Grant at the York Hall in Bethnal Green. He compiled an unbeaten ledger of 19-0 with wins over the likes of Rocky Dean and Shinny Bayaar before getting a crack at the vacant British title in May 2005. He won the title with a win over Dale Robinson at the Elephant & Castle center in Southwark to become British Bantamweight champion.

== British champion and Commonwealth challenger ==
Following his victory over Robinson Power defended his title twice beating Ian Napa on a split decision over 12 rounds and Issac Ward who was stopped in the 8th round. Both contests took place at the York Hall. In June 2006 Power got the opportunity to add the Commonwealth title to his British when he met unknown South African Tshifhiwa Munyai once again in Bethnal Green. Munyai proved to be more than a handful and stopped Power in the 9th round to inflict the first professional defeat of his career on Power. A return match was organised in January 2007 but this match-up worked out even worse for Power as he was again defeated this time when his corner pulled him out in the 4th round with a shoulder injury. Power never lost the British Title he relinquish it as he wasn't fit to defend it against Nicky Booth due to his shoulder injury.

== Defeats to Napa and Davies ==
In November 2007 Power challenged former foe Ian Napa for the British title that he had himself relinquished. Napa had beaten Jason Booth for the vacant version and Power was to be his first defence. Napa ended up winning the rematch in 12 rounds and Power crashed to his third consecutive defeat. On 18 December 2008, after being out of the ring for over a year, Power travelled to Dublin and lost for the fourth time in a row this time against Gary Davies, who would go on to become a British champion himself, via a 2nd-round TKO.

== Changing stables ==
Power chose to return to the amateur club in which he began his boxing career in a bid to return to winning ways. Power had initially joined the St Pancras amateur boxing club as an eight-year-old and went on to win a number of amateur titles for the club. Returning to the club as a professional also meant that Power would team up with St Pancras head coach CJ Hussein. On 2 June 2009 Power returned to action with Hussein in his corner and defeated Sid Razak at the York Hall. The return to winning ways did not last however, when in his next outing, on 11 September 2009, Power lost to Stuart Hall by stoppage in the 8th round of their 8-round contest. On 11 December 2009 Power met former British and Commonwealth title challenger Matthew Edmonds at the Newport Leisure Centre in Wales and scored a 5th round stoppage, topping off a mixed year since the return to St. Pancras.

== British title challenge ==
On 23 July 2010 Power returned to championship action as the challenger to former conqueror Stuart Hall who had gone on to lift the title with a win over Ian Napa earlier in the year. The fight, in Sunderland, saw Hall once again come out on top with the referee stopping the contest in the 10th round. For Hall it was only the 11th pro fight of his career and the 10th win with Power slipping to a sixth career defeat.

Preceded by Nicky Booth vacated	British Bantamweight Champion; 20 May 2005 – 6 July 2007 vacated	Succeeded by Ian Napa
