= Anthony Joshua vs. Joseph Parker =

Boxing competition

Road to Undisputed
- Date: 31 March 2018
- Venue: Principality Stadium, Cardiff, Wales
- Title(s) on the line: WBA (Super), IBF, WBO and IBO heavyweight titles

Tale of the tape
Boxer	Anthony Joshua	Joseph Parker
Nickname	AJ	
Hometown	London, England	Auckland, New Zealand
Purse	£18,000,000	£8,000,000
Pre-fight record	20–0 (20 KOs)	24–0 (18 KOs)
Age	28 years, 5 months	26 years, 2 months
Height	6 ft 6 in (198 cm)	6 ft 4 in (193 cm)
Weight	242.2 lb (110 kg)	236.7 lb (107 kg)
Style	Orthodox	Orthodox
Recognition	WBA (Super), IBF and IBO; Heavyweight Champion; The Ring/TBRB; No. 1 Ranked Heavyweight	WBO; Heavyweight Champion; The Ring/TBRB; No. 3 Ranked Heavyweight

Result
- Joshua wins via 12-round 'unanimous decision (118–110, 119–109, 118–110)

Anthony Joshua vs. Joseph Parker, billed as Road to Undisputed, was a professional boxing match contested on 31 March 2018, for the unified WBA (Super), IBF, WBO and IBO heavyweight championship. The event took place at the Principality Stadium in Cardiff, Wales. Joshua won the fight by unanimous decision, marking the first time he went the distance. Two judges scored it 118–110 and the other 119–109 all in favor of Joshua

== Background ==
It was reported that Joseph Parker's team were looking at Lucas Browne as a potential match-up if they failed to land a unification fight with Joshua. According to Parker's promoter David Higgins, a date in March 2018 was being discussed with Joshua's team, however Eddie Hearn offered an 80–20 split, which would favour Joshua. Higgins spoke to Fairfax Media, saying the offer would need to be more reasonable, also taking into consideration the fight would take place in the UK. Other names discussed for a summer 2018 fight included Bryant Jennings and Alexander Povetkin.

According to a Tweet from Parker on 15 November 2017, he was offered less than half of what was paid to Charles Martin when he defended his IBF title against Joshua. The next day, Higgins told Fairfax Media that he and Hearn were still negotiating a deal that would benefit all parties. Parker stated he was willing to drop to 35% of the net profit. Higgins made a final offer to Hearn on 22 November 2017. He told Sky Sports, "It's our final bottom line decision. We feel anything less is disrespectful or a disgrace." On 29 November 2017, Hearn stated the fight could be confirmed within two weeks. Higgins listed Camp Nou as the potential venue.

According to Hearn on 11 December 2017, a deal was very close to being announced with the Principality Stadium a frontrunner to host the fight. Hearn said they were over-paying Parker, with the deal being 65-35. On 28 December 2017, Higgins announced that a split had been agreed which would see Parker earn between 30–35% of the purse and the fight should take place in April 2018. Higgins stated that a rematch clause would be in place for Joshua, should he lose. In a potential rematch, Parker would get a 55% split. It was reported that Joshua would earn a career-high £18 million and Parker would also earn a career-high pay of £8 million.

On 8 January 2018, the Principality Stadium in Cardiff was confirmed as the venue for the fight. On 14 January 2018, negotiations came to a close and the fight was officially announced to take place on 31 March in Cardiff, live on Sky Sports Box Office. In an official press release on 5 February 2018, Showtime announced they would televise the fight live in the United States.

=== Weigh-in ===
Joshua and Parker both came in lighter compared to their respective previous bouts. Parker weighed in first at 236.7 pounds, his lightest since he fought Solomon Haumono in July 2016. Joshua weighed 242.2 pounds, his lightest since 2014 when he fought Michael Sprott.

== The fights ==
=== Undercard ===
The PPV card began with victories for Joe Cordina and Josh Kelly before former world champion Anthony Crolla won a wide unanimous decision over Edson Ramirez.

=== Burnett vs. Parejo ===
The first world title bout on the card saw WBA bantamweight champion Ryan Burnett face mandatory challenger Yonfrez Parejo.

==== The fight ====
Burnett started the fight the better boxer before Parejo started to attack more from round 3. This made Burnett use technique and defence, making Parejo miss often. Burnett suffered a cut over his left eye from a clash of heads in round 7. This did not slow Burnett down and he continued to out-work Parejo. Parejo did not do enough to win the close rounds either. Burnett injured his right hand in round 3. The three judges scored the fight 120–108, 120–108 and 116–112 in favour of Burnett.

==== Aftermath ====
Speaking to Sky Sports after the bout Burnett would admit his hand had been injured during the bout "I think I broke my hand so I had to rely on my boxing skills".

Preceded by vs. Zhanat Zhakiyanov	Ryan Burnett's bouts 31 March 2018	Succeeded by vs. Nonito Donaire
Preceded by vs. Elkin Rosario	Yonfrez Parejo's bouts 31 March 2018	Succeeded by vs. Benjamin Mendoza

=== Povetkin vs. Price ===
The chief support saw former world title challenger Alexander Povetkin (WBA/WBO:1st, WBC/IBF:4th) face former British and Commonwealth heavyweight champion David Price.

In January 2018, after the unification bout between Joshua and Parker was announced, promoter Eddie Hearn offered Povetkin an opportunity to fight on the undercard with Price and Derek Chisora offered as potential opponents. The next day, Price spoke to Sky Sports stating he accepted Hearn's offer and would be willing to fight Povetkin. On 30 January, Hearn told a reporter a deal was close being done after Povetkin also agreed to the fight. Three days later, the fight was officially confirmed.

==== The fight ====
In round 3, Povetkin knocked Price down with a right hand to the head. Price got up and came back strong landing some hard punches of his own. Price hurt Povetkin late in round 3 with a left hook which resulted in Povetkin falling backwards towards the ropes. The referee ruled it a knockdown due to the ropes holding Povetkin up. Price wasn't able to take advantage of the knockdown however it appeared that he had tired himself out. Povetkin badly hurt Price with a right hand before finishing off with a left hook that put the defenseless Price down flat on the canvas. Without a count, referee Howard Foster halted the fight. The official time of the stoppage was at 1:02 of round 5.

==== Aftermath ====
Promoter Eddie Hearn suggested after the bout that Povetkin could face Dillian Whyte next before facing the winner of the main event "Povetkin is mandatory for Anthony Joshua, but Dillian wants to fight him in June".

Preceded by vs. Christian Hammer	Alexander Povetkin's bouts 31 March 2018	Succeeded by vs. Anthony Joshua
Preceded by vs. Kamil Sokolowski	David Price's bouts 31 March 2018	Succeeded by vs. Sergey Kuzmin

=== Main Event ===
Joshua was forced to go the distance to defeat Parker via a 12-round unanimous decision to claim the WBO title as well as retain his WBA (Super), IBF, and IBO belts. The judges scored the fight 118-110, 118-110 and 119-109 in favour of Joshua. Many media outlets, including ESPN, had the fight much closer, generally around 116-112 with Joshua the clear winner. With going the distance, Joshua's 20 fight knockout streak came to an end. Parker used his movement well to slip a lot of Joshua's attacks but in doing so did not do enough himself to win more rounds. Parker started the fight on the back-foot, allowing Joshua to take the opening rounds. There was an accidental clash of heads in round three, however neither boxer was cut from this. There was another accidental clash of heads in round nine where the referee called for a short break. Joshua's tape on his left glove kept coming loose and he was ordered to go back to his corner for a re-tape. Parker suffered a cut over his left eye from an accidental elbow. In round twelve, neither boxer engaged as much as expected with Joshua trying to track Parker down, who again, on the backfoot looked to survive the round. The fight was marred by Italian referee Giuseppe Quartarone, who kept both boxers from fighting on the inside. This mostly had negative impact on Parker, where he was seen to have the most success. The referee was breaking the action each time both boxers were on the inside, even when they were still throwing shots. Many boxers, pundits and both the Sky Sports and Showtime broadcast team criticised the referee during and after the fight.

CompuBox punch stats showed that Joshua landed 139 of 383 punches thrown (36.3%) and Parker landed 101 of his 492 thrown (20.5%). Joshua used his reach advantage and utilised his jab more often from round seven and onwards. In total, Joshua landed 93 jabs with a connect rate of 34.4%. Parker landed 49 jabs with a much lower connect rate of 15.5%. Parker was the busier power puncher of the two, landing 52 power punches which included 29 to the body of Joshua (29.5%). Joshua was more accurate with his power shots in landing 46 with a connect rate of 40.7%.

== Aftermath ==
After the fight, Joshua explained his game plan for the fight, "My strategy in there was kind of stick behind the jab. It’s one of the most important weapons. The old saying is the right hand could take you around the block, but a good jab will take you around the world. And that secured another championship belt. So I stuck behind the jab and I made sure anything that was coming back, I was switched on, I was focused and 12 rounds, baby! I thought it was hard, right?"

Parker was humble in defeat and stated he would back stronger, "Today I got beaten by a better champion, bigger man. A lot to work on. It was a good experience being here. Thank you all for the opportunity to fight in this big stadium. We’re gonna go back, train hard, plan again and come back stronger. No regrets, you know, take it on the chin. … So we’ll be back again." When asked what he would do different, Parker replied, "Work harder. Come back stronger, more punches. But I would love to have another go. Just back to the drawing board."

During the post fight press conference, Parker's team stated the referee did not speak English, whereas Joshua and his promoter Hearn disagreed and said he spoke English fluently.

== Viewership and revenue ==
In Cardiff, the fight drew a live gate audience of 78,000 spectators at the Principality Stadium, generating approximately $10.4 million in live gate revenue.

On Sky Box Office, the fight sold 1.457 million pay-per-view buys in the United Kingdom. At a viewing price of £19.95 ($27), the fight grossed approximately £29.1 million ($40 million) in pay-per-view revenue.

The fight was shown live in the United States on Showtime in the afternoon. The live showing averaged 346,000 viewers and peaked at 379,000 viewers. A replay was shown later in the evening which saw an increase. The replay averaged 430,000 viewers and peaked at 483,000 viewers. Nielsen Media Research., who released the figures do not have the facility to measure whether the same customers that watched the live showing tuned in for the replay. These figures were an increase for Joshua on Showtime, as his last fight on Showtime against Carlos Takam in October 2017 averaged 334,000 viewers.

== Fight card ==
Confirmed bouts:

Weight Class		vs.		Method	Round	Time	Notes
Heavyweight	(United Kingdom) Anthony Joshua (c)	def.	(New Zealand) Joseph Parker (c)	UD	12		^{Note 1}
Heavyweight	(Russia) Alexander Povetkin	def.	(United Kingdom) David Price	KO	5/12
Bantamweight	(United Kingdom) Ryan Burnett (c)	def.	(Venezuela) Yonfrez Parejo	UD	12		^{Note 2}
Lightweight	(United Kingdom) Anthony Crolla	def.	(Mexico) Edson Ramirez	UD	10
Welterweight	(United Kingdom) Josh Kelly	def.	(Mexico) Carlos Molina	PTS	10
Lightweight	(United Kingdom) Joe Cordina	def.	(Belgium) Hakim Ben Ali	TKO	3/10
Preliminary bouts
Light heavyweight	(United Kingdom) Joshua Buatsi	def.	(Poland) Bartlomiej Grafka	PTS	6
Non-TV bouts
Super middleweight	(New Zealand) Mose Auimatagi Jnr	def.	(United Kingdom) Morgan Jones	TKO	6
Unfought floater bouts
Bantamweight	(United Kingdom) Sean McGoldrick	vs.	(United Kingdom) Ricky Little	N/a	4

^Note 1 For IBF, WBA (Super), WBO and IBO heavyweight titles.
^Note 2 For WBA (Super) bantamweight title.

== Broadcasting ==
Country	Broadcaster
Austria	DAZN
Australia	Main Event
Belarus	Match TV
Belgium	VOOsport World 1
Bulgaria	Diema Sport
Croatia	RTL Televizija
Czech Republic	Nova Sport 1
Denmark	TV3+
Estonia	Viasat Sport Baltic
Finland	Viaplay
France	SFR Sport
Germany	DAZN
Hungary	Sport2
Ireland	Sky Box Office
Israel	Sport 1
Italy	Sky Sport Plus
Latvia	Viasat Sport Baltic
Liechtenstein	DAZN
Lithuania	Viasat Sport Baltic
Luxemburg	VOOsport World 1
Moldova	Pro TV
Netherlands	RTL 7
New Zealand	SKY Arena
Norway	Viaplay
Panama	RPC Channel 4
Poland	TVP Sport
Romania	Pro TV
Russia	Match TV
Samoa	TV3
Slovakia	Dajto
Sweden	Viaplay
Switzerland	DAZN
United Arab Emirates	OSN Sports
United Kingdom	Sky Box Office
United States	Showtime
Sub-Saharan Africa	Kwesé Sports
Latin America	Canal Space

== See also ==
- Boxing in Wales
- Sport in Wales

Preceded by vs. Carlos Takam	Anthony Joshua's bouts 31 March 2018	Succeeded by vs. Alexander Povetkin
Preceded by vs. Hughie Fury	Joseph Parker's bouts 31 March 2018	Succeeded by vs. Dillian Whyte
