= Luis Hinojosa =

Dominican boxer (born 1986)

Luis Ernesto Hinojosa Compres (born 1 November 1986), is a professional boxer from the Dominican Republic. He has held the WBA Fedecaribe flyweight and the WBA Fedelatin bantamweight titles.

== Professional career ==
=== World title fight ===
Hinojosa lost to Yonfrez Parejo for the World Boxing Association bantamweight interim world title.

=== Other notable opponents ===
Hinojosa had a no contest against world title challenger Jonathan Guzmán due to an accidental headbutt.

He also has a loss to world title challenger Claudio Marrero.

He also has a loss to vacant WBA NABA USA title challenger Kazakh Mussa Tursyngaliyev in March, 2018 in Florida.
