= Reymart Gaballo =

Filipino boxer (born 1996)

Personal information
- Nickname: Assassin
- Nationality: Filipino
- Born: 24 August 1996 (age 30) Polomolok, Philippines
- Height: 5 ft 6 in (168 cm)
- Weight: Bantamweight; Super-bantamweight

Boxing career
- Reach: 68 in (173 cm)
- Stance: Orthodox

Boxing record
- Total fights: 32
- Wins: 30
- Win by KO: 25
- Losses: 2

Reymart Grande Gaballo (born 24 August 1996) is a Filipino professional boxer. He held the WBC interim bantamweight title from 2020 to 2021 and previously held the WBA interim bantamweight title in 2018. He also challenged for the WBC bantamweight title in 2021.

== Professional career ==
Gaballo turned professional in 2014 and won 18 consecutive fights before challenging and beating Stephon Young for the WBA interim bantamweight title.

=== Gaballo vs. Rodríguez ===
On 19 December 2020, Gaballo fought Emmanuel Rodríguez for the vacant WBC interim bantamweight title. Rodríguez was ranked #1 by the WBC and by The Ring at bantamweight. Despite being outclassed, outboxed and outpunched by Rodríguez in a lopsided contest, the judges gave Gaballo a split-decision win, which was seen as a robbery. One judge saw Rodríguez as the clear winner, scoring it 118–110 in his favor, while the other two judges scored it 116-112 and 115–112 in favor of Gaballo. The fans also found Rodríguez as the clear winner, with 30 scorers on BoxRec averaging a score of 116.57–111.63 in favor of Rodríguez.

=== Gaballo vs. Donaire ===
In his next bout, Gaballo challenged Nonito Donaire for the WBC bantamweight title. Donaire started the fight strong, and then proceeded to finish Gaballo in the fourth round with a left hook to the liver from which Gaballo couldn't get up from.

=== Gaballo vs. Sueno, Bravo ===
After tasting defeat, Gaballo on his next bout fought compatriot Ricardo Sueno for the vacant WBO Oriental and ABCO Asian Continental bantamweight titles at Lagao Gym, General Santos, where Gaballo made an astonishing 2nd-round TKO, on Gaballo's first title defense of the WBO Oriental title against Michael Bravo whom just recently returned to boxing, gave him a close fight ending in an SD win for Gaballo eventually.

=== Gaballo vs. Paipharob ===
Prior to the Michael Bravo victory, Gaballo became the mandatory challenger for Jason Moloney's WBO title, Moloney would first defend his title on a rather controversial victory against Saul Sanchez, a month after that, Gaballo made his second defense of the Oriental belt against veteran and former Interim WBA strawweight champion Paipharob Kokietgym, Gaballo makes a quick work out of his Thai foe as he landed the same shot that Donaire made him taste defeat, left punch to the body, ending the bout in 32 seconds. Although Gaballo seemed like the reasonable opponent for Moloney, however, on March 6, 2024, Moloney would be announced to defend his WBO title against Yoshiki Takei.

=== Gaballo vs. Torres ===
On April 7, 2024, Gaballo was set to have a keep-busy fight before taking a world championship bout, awaiting for Moloney vs. Takei winner, Gaballo's opponent, Kenbun Torres is an interesting opponent, having a rather lackluster career from 2003 to 2007, amassing a record of 10–2 before retiring until Torres' return in 2016 amassing a record of 12–3, and retiring again, in 2023 he returned again and his first bout was an upset knockout loss against a journeyman but would compose a record of 13–5 before fighting Gaballo, Torres later vowed to make a life-changing victory, and so Torres did, Torres scored a shocking 3 knockdowns against Gaballo en route to a first-round TKO loss for Gaballo.

== Professional boxing record ==
33 fights	31 wins	2 losses
By knockout	26	2
By decision	5	0

No.	Result	Record	Opponent	Type	Round, time	Date	Location	Notes
33	Win	31–2	Jelo Bacalso	TKO	3 (6)	27 Apr 2026	Villa Kristen Resort and Hotel, General Santos, Philippines	
32	Win	30–2	Pawan Kumar Arya	RTD	3 (10), 3:00	31 Aug 2025	Phela Grande Convention Center, General Santos, Philippines	
31	Win	29–2	James Pagaling	KO	3 (10), 2:50	18 Dec 2024	Bula Gymnasium, General Santos, Philippines	
30	Win	28–2	Jeny Boy Boca	TKO	1 (8), 1:16	30 Aug 2024	Polomolok Gym, Polomolok, Philippines	
29	Loss	27–2	Kenbun Torres	TKO	1 (8), 2:33	10 May 2024	Midas Hotel and Casino, Pasay, Philippines	
28	Win	27–1	Paipharob Kokietgym	KO	1 (10), 0:32	13 Feb 2024	Midas Hotel and Casino, Pasay, Philippines	Retained WBO Oriental bantamweight title
27	Win	26–1	Michael Bravo	SD	10	27 Jun 2023	Elorde Sports Complex, Parañaque, Philippines	Retained WBO Oriental bantamweight title
26	Win	25–1	Ricardo Sueno	TKO	2 (10), 2:44	29 Oct 2022	Lagao Gym, General Santos, Philippines	Won vacant WBC-ABCO Continental and WBO Oriental bantamweight titles
25	Loss	24–1	Nonito Donaire	KO	4 (12), 2:59	11 Dec 2021	Dignity Health Sports Park, Carson, California, U.S.	For WBC bantamweight title
24	Win	24–0	Emmanuel Rodríguez	SD	12	19 Dec 2020	Mohegan Sun Arena, Montville, Connecticut, U.S.	Won vacant WBC interim bantamweight title
23	Win	23–0	Kongfah Nakornluang	TKO	6 (10), 2:56	14 Dec 2019	Elorde Sports Complex, Parañaque, Philippines	
22	Win	22–0	Yeison Vargas	TKO	3 (10), 2:04	31 Aug 2019	Minneapolis Armory, Minneapolis, Minnesota, U.S.	
21	Win	21–0	Yuya Nakamura	TKO	2 (10), 1:44	9 Feb 2019	Midas Hotel and Casino, Pasay, Philippines	
20	Win	20–0	Julias Kisarawe	TKO	1 (10), 2:25	30 Sep 2018	SM City North EDSA Skydome, Quezon City, Philippines	
19	Win	19–0	Stephon Young	UD	12	23 Mar 2018	Hard Rock Live, Hollywood, Florida, U.S.	Won vacant WBA interim bantamweight title
18	Win	18–0	Ulises Rivero	TKO	6 (6), 0:59	26 Nov 2017	Domo Deportivo, Tulum, Mexico	
17	Win	17–0	Ernesto Guerrero	TKO	2 (10), 1:58	15 Nov 2017	Hawaii Events Center, Honolulu, Hawaii, U.S.	
16	Win	16–0	Jerson Luzarito	TKO	2 (8), 0:34	4 Dec 2016	Robinson’s Mall Atrium, General Santos, Philippines	
15	Win	15–0	Manot Comput	KO	1 (12), 1:49	10 Sep 2016	Municipal Gymnasium, Tupi, Philippines	Won vacant WBC-ABCO super-bantamweight title
14	Win	14–0	Jilo Merlin	KO	4 (8), 1:55	26 Jun 2016	Gaisano Mall Atrium, General Santos, Philippines	
13	Win	13–0	Marlon Arcilla	TKO	1 (6), 1:01	30 Apr 2016	Cinema Square Boxing Arena, Makati, Philippines	
12	Win	12–0	Bryan Samson	KO	1 (8), 1:28	13 Feb 2016	Gaisano Mall Atrium, General Santos, Philippines	
11	Win	11–0	Romulo Ramayan Jr	KO	1 (8), 2:39	27 Nov 2015	Safii Compound Gymnasium, General Santos, Philippines	
10	Win	10–0	Frejun Dela Cruz	TKO	1 (6), 2:33	26 Sep 2015	Gaisano Mall Atrium, General Santos, Philippines	
9	Win	9–0	Rocky Alvarez	TKO	1 (6), 2:09	7 Jun 2015	Robinson’s Mall Atrium, General Santos, Philippines	
8	Win	8–0	Michael Padayag	TKO	1 (6), 1:49	8 Mar 2015	T'Boli Municipal Gym, T'Boli, Philippines	
7	Win	7–0	Paulo Perono	UD	6	17 Jan 2015	Oval Plaza Covered Court, General Santos, Philippines	
6	Win	6–0	Rodel Garde	UD	4	27 Nov 2014	Safii Compound Gymnasium, General Santos, Philippines	
5	Win	5–0	Zaldy Jordan Jr	TKO	2 (4), 1:26	13 Sep 2014	Lagao Gym, General Santos, Philippines	
4	Win	4–0	George Auguis	TKO	1 (4), 0:47	2 Jul 2014	Bula Gymnasium, General Santos, Philippines	
3	Win	3–0	Bryan Dave Casumpang	KO	1 (4), 0:40	24 May 2014	Lagao Gym, General Santos, Philippines	
2	Win	2–0	Jayson Engalan	TKO	1 (4), 1:23	20 Mar 2014	Lagao Gym, General Santos, Philippines	
1	Win	1–0	Kevin Cabonales	TKO	1 (4), 0:27	2 Feb 2014	Iligan, Lanao del Norte, Philippines	

== See also ==
- List of bantamweight boxing champions
- History of boxing in the Philippines

Sporting positions
Regional boxing titles
Vacant Title last held by Vic Darchinyan	WBC-ABC super-bantamweight champion 10 September 2016 – 2017	Vacant Title next held by Glenn Porras
World boxing titles
Vacant Title last held by Zhanat Zhakiyanov	WBA bantamweight champion Interim title 23 March 2018 - February 2019	Title discontinued
Vacant Title last held by Takuma Inoue	WBC bantamweight champion Interim title 19 December 2020 - 11 December 2021; Lost bid for full title	Vacant
