= Yonfrez Parejo =

Venezuelan boxer

Personal information
- Nickname: El Verdugo
- Born: Yonfrez Antonio Parejo; August 1, 1986 (age 39) Valencia, Venezuela
- Height: 5 ft 8 in (173 cm)
- Weight: Bantamweight; Super bantamweight

Boxing career
- Reach: 67 in (170 cm)
- Stance: Orthodox

Boxing record
- Total fights: 31
- Wins: 24
- Win by KO: 12
- Losses: 6
- Draws: 1

Yonfrez Antonio Parejo (born August 1, 1986) is a Venezuelan professional boxer.

== World title ==
Parejo won the World Boxing Association interim bantamweight world title by defeating Luis Hinojosa. He had previously lost an attempt for that title to Hugo Ruiz. He lost in his first defense to Zhanat Zhakiyanov by split decision. Parejo would eventually get a shot at the full title when he fought WBA super champion Ryan Burnett, he would lose via unanimous decision.

== Professional boxing record ==
31 fights	24 wins	6 losses
By knockout	12	2
By decision	12	4
Draws	1	

No.	Result	Record	Opponent	Type	Round, time	Date	Location	Notes
31	Loss	24–6–1	Ariel Perez De La Torre	UD	8	24 Feb 2023	Hialeah Park Race Track, Hialeah, Florida, U.S.	
30	Loss	24–5–1	Tomoki Kameda	UD	12	11 Dec 2021	Centro de Usos Múltiples, Hermosillo, Mexico	
29	Win	24–4–1	Jordan Escobar	RTD	4 (8)	2 Feb 2019	Palacio Dorado, Panama City, Panama	
28	Win	23–4–1	Eusebio Osejo	SD	6	27 Nov 2019	Hotel El Panama, Panama City, Panama	
27	Loss	22–4–1	Brandon Figueroa	RTD	8 (12)	20 Apr 2019	Dignity Health Sports Park, Carson, California, U.S.	For WBA interim super bantamweight title
26	Win	22–3–1	Benjamin Mendoza	KO	4 (8)	2 Feb 2019	BN Arena, Hatillo, Costa Rica	
25	Loss	21–3–1	Ryan Burnett	UD	12	31 Mar 2018	Millennium Stadium, Cardiff, Wales, U.K.	For WBA (Super) bantamweight title
24	Win	21–2–1	Elkin Rosario	KO	2 (8)	23 Sep 2017	Centro Comercial El Tesoro, Medellin, Colombia	
23	Win	20–2–1	Lorenzo Parra II	UD	10	8 Jun 2017	Centro de Convenciones, Barranquilla, Colombia	
22	Win	19–2–1	Jose Rios	SD	9	21 Oct 2016	Centro de Convenciones El Cifco, San Salvador, El Salvador	Won WBA Fedecaribe super bantamweight title
21	Win	18–2–1	Argel Berrio	RTD	7 (8)	29 Apr 2016	Centro de Convenciones, Barranquilla, Colombia	
20	Loss	17–2–1	Zhanat Zhakiyanov	SD	12	7 Nov 2015	Salle des Étoiles, Monte Carlo, Monaco	Lost WBA interim bantamweight title
19	Win	17–1–1	Jhon Alberto Molina	KO	2 (10)	15 Aug 2015	Centro Comercial Hyper Jumbo, Maracay, Venezuela	
18	Win	16–1–1	Luis Hinojosa	TKO	11 (12)	30 Aug 2014	Parque Naciones Unidas, Caracas, Venezuela	Won WBA interim bantamweight title
17	Win	15–1–1	Rafael Castillo	UD	8	15 Feb 2014	Hotel El Panama, Panama City, Panama	
16	Win	14–1–1	Luis Felipe Cuadrado	KO	3 (8)	20 Jul 2013	Gimnasio de Curundu, Panama City, Panama	
15	Win	13–1–1	Eddy Zuniga	TKO	1 (8)	5 Apr 2013	Club Nautico Caribe, Colon City, Panama	
14	Win	12–1–1	Angky Angkotta	UD	12	2 Nov 2012	Indosiar Studio, Jakarta, Indonesia	
13	Loss	11–1–1	Hugo Ruiz	TKO	8 (12)	31 Mar 2012	Gimnasio Auditorio, Los Cabos, Mexico	For WBA interim bantamweight title
12	Win	11–0–1	Jean Sampson	UD	11	3 Feb 2012	Hotel Sheraton, Colon City, Panama	Won vacant WBA Fedelatin bantamweight title
11	Win	10–0–1	Rafael Castillo	MD	8	2 Dec 2011	Hotel Sheraton, Colon City, Panama	
10	Win	9–0–1	Cristian Flores	UD	6	3 Nov 2011	Pepper's Night Club, Zapote, Costa Rica	
9	Win	8–0–1	Alejandro Corrales	UD	9	19 Oct 2011	Palacio Dorado, Panama City	Won vacant WBA Fedebol bantamweight title
8	Win	7–0–1	Eduardo Blackman	KO	4 (4)	3 Sep 2011	Hotel Sheraton, Colon City, Panama	
7	Win	6–0–1	Omar Anderson	KO	3 (6)	11 Aug 2011	Roberto Durán Arena, Panama City, Panama	
6	Win	5–0–1	Victor Peralta	TKO	4 (6)	3 Jun 2011	Palacio Dorado, Panama City, Panama	
5	Win	4–0–1	Francisco Herrera	TKO	3 (6)	12 Nov 2010	Coliseo Kid Dumlop, Santa Marta, Colombia	
4	Win	3–0–1	Albert Gonzalez	UD	4	19 Apr 2010	Centro Recreacional Yesterday, Turmero, Venezuela	
3	Draw	2–0–1	Sandro Hernandez	MD	4	27 Mar 2010	Polideportivo José María Vargas, La Guaira, Venezuela	
2	Win	2–0	Alexander Gonzalez	UD	4	31 Oct 2009	Parque Naciones Unidas, Caracas, Venezuela	
1	Win	1–0	Leider Cotes	UD	4	3 Oct 2009	Cancha Deportiva Los Robles, Isla Margarita, Venezuela	

Sporting positions
Regional boxing titles
Vacant Title last held by Anselmo Moreno	WBA Fedebol bantamweight champion October 19, 2011 – 2012; Vacated	Vacant Title next held by Luis Meléndez
Vacant Title last held by Liborio Solís	WBA Fedelatin bantamweight champion February 3, 2012 – 2012; Vacated	Vacant Title next held by Juan Carlos Payano
Vacant Title last held by William Encarnación	WBA Fedecaribe super-bantamweight champion October 21, 2016 – 2017; Vacated	Vacant Title next held by Ranfis Encarnación
World boxing titles
Vacant Title last held by Hugo Ruiz	WBA bantamweight champion Interim title August 30, 2014 – November 7, 2015	Succeeded by Zhanat Zhakiyanov
