= Ryan Burnett =

Irish boxer (born 1992)

Personal information
- Nationality: Irish
- Born: 21 May 1992 (age 34) Belfast, Northern Ireland
- Height: 5 ft 4 in (163 cm)
- Weight: Bantamweight

Boxing career
- Reach: 66 in (168 cm)
- Stance: Orthodox

Boxing record
- Total fights: 21
- Wins: 20
- Win by KO: 10
- Losses: 1
Medal record
Representing Ireland
Youth Olympic Games
Gold medal – first place	2010 Singapore	Light-flyweight
World Youth Championships
Silver medal – second place	2010 Baku	Light-flyweight

Ryan Burnett (born 21 May 1992) is an Irish former professional boxer who competed from 2013 to 2019. He was a unified bantamweight world champion, having held the WBA (Unified) and IBF titles between 2017 and 2018. At regional level he held the British bantamweight title from 2015 to 2017. As an amateur, he represented Ireland at the 2010 Summer Youth Olympics and won a gold medal in the light-flyweight division.

== Early life ==
Burnett was born in Belfast, Northern Ireland. He is the middle child of three brothers, Burnett was educated at St Patrick's College, a Roman Catholic secondary school on the Antrim Road.. With an interest in boxing from as young as four years of age, Burnett began training at Belfast's Kronk Gym before moving to Gerry Storey's Holy Family Boxing Club, a gym famed for uniting boxers of different religious and political backgrounds. Fighters like Burnett and Paddy Barnes, have always trained here alongside fighters of unionist backgrounds such as Carl Frampton, which through the years helped break down borders in their community.

== Amateur career ==
Burnett amassed an amateur record of 94 wins and 4 losses; he claims to still "dispute most of those losses." While rising to number one in the AIBA World Youth amateur rankings, Burnett won seven All Ireland titles and four Ulster titles, along with several multi-nations tournament medals. The highlights of his amateur career were his silver and gold medal wins at the World Youth Championships and Olympic Youth Games, respectively. After acquiring those medals, Burnett suffered a back injury that ruled him out of competition for a year, and hampered his opportunities for success at senior level. Not long after regaining fitness, Burnett decided to turn professional.

=== 2010 World Youth Championships ===
Burnett won five fights in seven days on his way to the final of the World Youth Championships in Baku. He defeated Erik Sokolov of Germany – 4–0, Manuel Fabrizio of Italy – 3–1, and Rober Estrada Barrera of Colombia – 16–4 in the first three rounds. In the quarter-finals he met Filipino fighter Mark Anthony Barriga, who he overcame with a 6–4 win. In the semi's, he defeated Cuban fighter Yosvany Veitía in a 5–3 victory. Burnett then met local Azerbaijani, Salman Alizade in the final. After a gruelling week for Burnett, the home favourite took the win, sending Burnett home with a silver medal.

=== 2010 Olympic Youth Games ===
Burnett won gold at the inaugural Olympic Youth Games in 2010, and became the first ever Youth Olympics boxing gold medalist in the process. In the semi-final of the games, which took place in Singapore, Burnett defeated Zohidion Hoorboyev of Uzbekistan. In the final, Burnett once again met Salman Alizade, who he had lost to in the World Championships. Alizada went into the fight as the world number one, but Burnett avenged his previous loss with a dominant 13–6 victory.

== Professional career ==
=== Bantamweight ===
==== Early career ====
Burnett turned professional in January 2012, after signing a deal with Hatton Promotions. He then moved to Manchester, England where he would be trained by company founder – former world champion Ricky Hatton.

With Hatton Promotions enduring turbulent times, Burnett was forced to leave their stable in September 2014. After what had been a long spell out of competition, he joined up with Adam Booth in London to kick-start his pro career.

In November 2015, Burnett received a shot at the vacant British bantamweight title against former holder, Jason Booth. Despite managing a first round knockdown over the veteran Brit, Burnett was taken the distance and won the fight via unanimous decision. In January 2016, it was announced that Burnett would fight on the undercard of fellow Belfast boxer, Carl Frampton, in his world title unification bout with Scott Quigg at the Manchester Arena on 27 February 2016. Burnett faced Frenchman, Anthony Settoul, for the WBC International bantamweight title. Burnett produced a highly praised performance, and won the fight through another unanimous decision.

==== Burnett vs. Haskins ====
On 27 April 2017, it was announced that Burnett would challenge Lee Haskins for the IBF bantamweight title on 10 June at the SSE Arena in Belfast, live on Sky Sports. The fight would mark Haskins' third defence since winning the title in 2015. Speaking on his first world title challenge, Burnett said, "I always dreamed of headlining in Belfast and now I have the opportunity to do it for a World Title – I’m so excited." Burnett defeated Haskins via a 12-round split decision to win his first world title and become Northern Ireland's first world bantamweight champion on 20 years. Burnett dropped Haskins twice in the fight in knocking him down once in round 6 and again in round 11. Both fighters were cut from a clash of heads in the round 2. The final judges’ scores were 119–107, 119-107 for Burnett and 118-108 for Haskins. The result was later changed to a unanimous decision as judge Clark Sammartino who scored the fight for Haskins put the wrong name in the box. Haskins had the most success in the opening two rounds, however Burnett took control of the fight and dominated until the end. After the fight, promoter Eddie Hearn said, "I believe a new star is born in Belfast. I believe Burnett won by a 12 round unanimous decision tonight. I’m going to speak to Adam Smith tomorrow." Speaking of judge Sammartino, Robert Smith, the British Boxing Board of Control secretary stated, "He will not be coming back to this country and I will be telling the IBF." WBO beltholder Zolani Tete called out Burnett for a unification bout, stating he was happy for it to take place in Belfast.

==== Burnett vs. Zhakiyanov ====
Although Burnett did not take Tete's offer, he still chased a unification fight and on 2 August 2017, a deal was reached for him to defend his IBF title against WBA Undisupted champion Zhanat Zhakiyanov (27–1, 18 KOs) at the SSE Arena in Belfast on 21 October. Ricky Hatton, who also trained Burnett, was Zhakiyanov's trainer and led him to win the WBA belt against Rau'shee Warren on 10 February. In front large pro-Burnett crowd, Burnett won a wide 12 round unanimous decision over Zhakiyanov to become the unified IBF and WBA bantamweight champion. The judges scored the fight 118–110, 119-109 and 116-112 all in favour of Burnett. Both fighters fought closely together, with Zhakiyanov getting the better of the exchanges at the start of the fight. By round 5, Burnett began using his jab more and finding a good range. Towards the end, Burnett was doing the better work on the inside and landing the cleaner shots.

==== Burnett vs. Parejo ====
In January 2018, IBF mandatory challenger Emmanuel 'Manny' Rodriguez (17–0, 12 KO) and his team tried and failed to reach a deal with former champion Lee Haskins, in a bout where the winner would have received the Interim IBF title, which forced IBF to order purse bids between Rodriguez and Burnett. The purse bid was set for 12 February. At the time the purse bids were ordered, Eddie Hearn was already in talks with Venezuelan boxer Yonfrez Parejo (21–2–1, 10 KOs), who is also the WBA mandatory, to hold a fight on the Joshua vs. Parker undercard on 31 March at the Principality Stadium in Cardiff. Hearn explained to Sky Sports, "The IBF called an interim title bout between Emmanuel Rodriguez and Lee Haskins, so we proceeded to make the fight with our WBA mandatory, Parejo. Last week we were notified that the [Rodriguez-Haskins] bout would no longer take place and that Rodriguez’s team [was] not willing to negotiate, and they called immediate purse bids. Our deal was already in place with Parejo, so we will vacate our IBF title and continue to face our WBA mandatory." On 12 February, Burnett vs. Parejo was confirmed. Burnett dominated Parejo over 12 rounds retaining his WBA title in the process. Burnett started the fight the better boxer before Parejo started to attack more from round 3. This made Burnett use technique and defence, making Parejo miss often. Burnett suffered a cut over his left eye from a clash of heads in round 7. This did not slow Burnett down and he continued to out-work Parejo. Parejo did not do enough to win the close rounds either. Burnett injured his right hand in round 3. The three judges scored the fight 120–108, 120-108 and 116–112 in favour of Burnett.

==== World Boxing Super Series ====
On 9 May 2018, at a news conference in London, the World Boxing Super Series announced that season 2 would include the bantamweights. Burnett, along with WBO champion Zolani Tete and IBF champion Emmanuel Rodriguez were the first 3 boxers announced for the tournament.

===== Burnett vs. Donaire =====
The draft gala took place in Moscow on 20 July 2018. Burnett, who was a top seed, chose to fight former four-weight world champion Nonito Donaire (38–5, 24 KOs) in the quarter-finals. Donaire had dropped down two weight divisions to enter the tournament. On 7 September, the WBSS announced a doubleheader would take place at The SSE Hydro in Glasgow on 3 November 2018. The card would see Burnett vs. Donaire as well as the quarter-final fight from the Super-lightweight tournament which would see Scottish boxer Josh Taylor go up against American boxer Ryan Martin. Burnett looked to have taken the first 2 rounds as Donaire reset in round 3 and began to box smarter. During round 4, Burnett reached for his lower back after throwing a combination of punches and was counted as a knock down for Donaire. Burnett survived the round but failed to answer the bell for round five. Burnett lost his WBA belt and was knocked out of the WBSS tourney. Donaire showed his respect to Burnett by going to his corner instead of celebrating the win. Burnett was attended to in the ring and later stretchered out. The injury occurred in his right internal oblique, where he tore muscle fibres after taking a left hook by Donaire 2:25 into the round. Burnett, who had back problems in the past, stated the injury was not career threatening.

=== Super-bantamweight ===
==== Signing with Top Rank ====
On 11 April 2019, Burnett announced he would return to the ring on an MTK Global show at the Ulster Hall in Belfast on 17 May 2019. His opponent for the return bout was scheduled to be Filipino boxer Jelbirt Gomera (14–5, 7 KOs) for the vacant WBC International super-bantamweight title. Burnett highlighted he was looking to become a two-weight world champion. As part of MTK's deal with Top Rank, the card would air live on ESPN+ in the United States. On 29 April, ahead of his return, Burnett signed a multi-fight deal with Top Rank.

Burnett was sharper, quicker and better than Gomera, landing numerous body shots on him. Gomera complained to the referee that the body shots had been below the belt line, for which the referee warned Burnett twice. In the sixth round, Gomera complained again and turned his back, at which point the referee decided to wave off the fight immediately, and award Burnett the TKO win.

=== Retirement ===
On October 25, 2019, Burnett retired from boxing citing persistent injuries. Burnett said: “Although my retirement is forced through injuries, I carry a heart full of satisfaction and gratitude,”.

== Professional boxing record ==
21 fights	20 wins	1 loss
By knockout	10	1
By decision	10	0

No.	Result	Record	Opponent	Type	Round, time	Date	Location	Notes
21	Win	20–1	(Philippines) Jelbirt Gomera	TKO	6 (10), 2:01	17 May 2019	(United Kingdom) Ulster Hall, Belfast, Northern Ireland	
20	Loss	19–1	(Philippines) Nonito Donaire	RTD	4 (12), 3:00	3 Nov 2018	(United Kingdom) The SSE Hydro, Glasgow, Scotland	Lost WBA (Super) bantamweight title; World Boxing Super Series: bantamweight quarter-final
19	Win	19–0	(Venezuela) Yonfrez Parejo	UD	12	31 Mar 2018	(United Kingdom) Principality Stadium, Cardiff, Wales	Retained WBA (Unified) bantamweight title
18	Win	18–0	(Kazakhstan) Zhanat Zhakiyanov	UD	12	21 Oct 2017	(United Kingdom) SSE Arena, Belfast, Northern Ireland	Retained IBF bantamweight title; Won WBA (Unified) bantamweight title
17	Win	17–0	(United Kingdom) Lee Haskins	UD	12	10 Jun 2017	(United Kingdom) SSE Arena, Belfast, Northern Ireland	Won IBF bantamweight title; Originally an SD, later ruled a UD after an incorrect judge's scorecard
16	Win	16–0	(Mexico) Joseafat Reyes	PTS	8	25 Feb 2017	(United Kingdom) Hull Arena, Hull, England	
15	Win	15–0	(United Kingdom) Ryan Farrag	UD	12	15 Oct 2016	(United Kingdom) Echo Arena, Liverpool, England	Retained British bantamweight title
14	Win	14–0	(Mexico) Cesar Ramirez	UD	10	30 Jul 2016	(United Kingdom) First Direct Arena, Leeds, England	Retained WBC International bantamweight title
13	Win	13–0	(France) Anthony Settoul	UD	10	27 Feb 2016	(United Kingdom) Manchester Arena, Manchester, England	Won vacant WBC International bantamweight title
12	Win	12–0	(United Kingdom) Jason Booth	UD	12	21 Nov 2015	(United Kingdom) Manchester Arena, Manchester, England	Won vacant British bantamweight title
11	Win	11–0	(Hungary) Robert Kanalas	TKO	2 (10), 1:24	10 Oct 2015	(United Kingdom) Manchester Arena, Manchester, England	Won vacant WBO European bantamweight title
10	Win	10–0	(Hungary) Csaba Kovacs	TKO	2 (8), 1:32	4 Jul 2015	(Republic of Ireland) National Stadium, Dublin, Ireland	
9	Win	9–0	(United States) Stephon McIntyre	KO	1 (6), 2:59	11 Apr 2015	(United States) Barclays Center, New York City, New York, US	
8	Win	8–0	(France) Faycal Messaoudene	PTS	6	27 Mar 2015	(United Kingdom) York Hall, London, England	
7	Win	7–0	(Ghana) Isaac Owusu	TKO	2 (6), 0:26	27 Feb 2015	(United Kingdom) IceSheffield, Sheffield, England	
6	Win	6–0	(Bulgaria) Stefan Slavchev	TKO	4 (4), 0:42	29 Nov 2014	(United Kingdom) York Hall, London, England	
5	Win	5–0	(Bulgaria) Valentin Marinov	TKO	1 (6), 3:00	22 Nov 2014	(United Kingdom) The Devenish Complex, Belfast, Northern Ireland	
4	Win	4–0	(Spain) Sergio Perez	UD	6	16 Nov 2013	National Gymnasium of Natural Sciences and Mathematics, Vratsa, Bulgaria	
3	Win	3–0	(Nicaragua) Reynaldo Cajina	TKO	2 (4), 1:52	19 Oct 2013	(United Kingdom) Odyssey Arena, Belfast, Northern Ireland	
2	Win	2–0	(Slovakia) Elemir Rafael	TKO	2 (4), 2:05	28 Jun 2013	(United Kingdom) Holiday Inn Ormeau Avenue, Belfast, Northern Ireland	
1	Win	1–0	(Hungary) Laszlo Nemesapati	KO	1 (4), 1:14	24 May 2013	(United Kingdom) Liverpool Olympia, Liverpool, England	

Sporting positions
Regional boxing titles
Vacant Title last held by Ross Burkinshaw	WBO European bantamweight champion 10 October 2015 – February 2016; Vacated	Vacant
Vacant Title last held by Lee Haskins	British bantamweight champion 21 November 2015 – June 2017; Vacated	Vacant Title next held by Josh Wale
Vacant Title last held by Ernesto Saulong	WBC International bantamweight champion 27 February 2016 – February 2017; Vacated	Vacant Title next held by Duke Micah
World boxing titles
Preceded by Lee Haskins	IBF bantamweight champion 10 June 2017 – 13 February 2018; Vacated	Vacant Title next held by Emmanuel Rodríguez
Preceded by Zhanat Zhakiyanov as Undisputed champion	WBA bantamweight champion Unified title 21 October 2017 – 31 October 2018; Promoted	Succeeded by Himself as Super champion
Preceded by Himself as Unified champion	WBA bantamweight champion Super title 31 October 2018 – 3 November 2018	Succeeded by Nonito Donaire
