= Emmanuel Rodríguez =

Puerto Rican boxer (born 1992)

Personal information
- Nicknames: Manny; El Sensacional ("The Sensational"); El Matador ("The Bullfighter")
- Born: Emmanuel Rodríguez Vázquez; August 8, 1992 (age 34) Manatí, Puerto Rico
- Height: 5 ft 6 in (168 cm)
- Weight: Bantamweight

Boxing career
- Reach: 66 1/2 in (169 cm)

Boxing record
- Total fights: 26
- Wins: 22
- Win by KO: 13
- Losses: 3
- No contests: 1
Medal record
Men's amateur boxing
Representing Puerto Rico
Youth Olympic Games
Gold medal – first place	2010 Singapore	Flyweight
Youth World Championships
Silver medal – second place	2010 Baku	Flyweight

Emmanuel Rodríguez Vázquez (born August 8, 1992) is a Puerto Rican professional boxer who has held the International Boxing Federation (IBF) bantamweight title twice between 2018 and 2024. As an amateur he represented Puerto Rico at the 2010 Summer Youth Olympics and won a gold medal in the flyweight event.

== Early life ==
Rodríguez is originally from Urbanización Villa Real near Ojo de Agua, a middle class urban sector of Vega Baja, Puerto Rico. His parents are Awilda Vázquez Soler and Luis Rodríguez. Throughout his childhood he practiced other sports before choosing boxing, including one of Puerto Rico's most widespread team sports, baseball. Rodríguez also served as forward of the local association football team, Invasores de Vega Baja. He studied at a local school named Escuela Lino Padrón Rivera until tenth grade. Due to his skill, he was subsequently enrolled at the Escuela Especializada en Deportes del Albergue Olímpico (ECEDAO), a specialized school run by the Comité Olímpico de Puerto Rico (COPUR) that provides education, residence, training and facilities to practice specific Olympic sports. On May 27, 2011, Rodríguez graduated as part of the program.

== Amateur career ==
=== Early international competition and Youth Olympic championship ===
By 2006, Rodríguez was already competing at a national Youth level, participating in the Juegos Nacionales Escolares 2006, where he defeated Emmanuel Ramírez of Arecibo (2:1) in the 13–14 years (41 kg) division. As an amateur, his corner team is led by Arturo Ríos and Orlando Rodríguez Zayas, who trained Puerto Rico's previous Olympic medalist, Daniel Santos. Despite still being ranked in the Youth category, Rodríguez entered the light flyweight open-class at the 2009 Pan-American Championships when he was 17 years old. He won his debut over Mexican National Light Flyweight Champion, Francisco Meléndez, by unanimous points decision (10:3). In the semifinals, he fought Cuban National Light Flyweight Subchampion, Daniel Matellón, winning a close fight by one point (11:10). In the finals, Rodríguez lost another close fight to Paulo Carvalho of Brasil, 12:9, to secure the silver medal. He had previously entered the 2009 Torneo Nacional de Boxeo Aficionado Isaac Barrientos, Puerto Rico's senior national championships, advancing to the semifinals before losing to Waldemar Pagán (12:9). Between May 19 through 23, Rodríguez participated in the 2009 Torneo Internacional José "Cheo" Aponte, another open-class international tournament. In the semifinals he fought Bryan Aquino, who had defeated Pagán for Puerto Rico's National Light Flyweight Championship, winning by points (19:5). In the finals, he was matched against Waldemar Rodríguez, defeating him by Referee Stopping Contest (RSC) in two rounds to win the gold medal. On July 5, 2009, Rodríguez competed in the finals of the Copa Olímpica Juan Evangelista Venegas, an annual tournament held by the COPUR, defeating Ángel Acosta by RSC in two rounds.

After ascending to the flyweight division, Rodríguez participated in the Copa Internacional de Boxeo Aficionado San Juan Bautista, a boxing dual where foreign golden gloves winners were invited. He was expected to compete in the 2010 Torneo Nacional de Boxeo Aficionado Isaac Barrientos, but he was unable to attend, awarding a walkover victory to his scheduled opponent, Jesús Soler. His next international participation was at the 2010 American Continental Elite Men Championships. Rodríguez competed twice, defeating Mexican National Flyweight Champion, Elías Emigdio, (8:6) and fellow Puerto Rican José Núñez (4:0). At the 2010 Youth World Amateur Boxing Championships which were held in Baku, Azerbaijan, he debuted with a RSC victory over Lassana Camara of Mali, after receiving a bye in the first date of eliminatories. In the round of 16, Rodríguez defeated Pahlavon Hojiyev of Uzbekistan, 6:4. He advanced to the semifinals with an 8:1 win over Min Hong of South Korea. His next opponent was Hesham Yehia Mahmoud Abdelaal of Egypt, whom he defeated with scores of 10:3. At the finals, he lost a 6:14 decision to local Shaban Shahpalangov. By winning the silver medal, Rodríguez became the second consecutive Puerto Rican to win recognition in the flyweight division at the Youth World Championships and secured participation in the 2010 Summer Youth Olympics.

After the World Championships, Rodríguez entered the Copa Olímpica Juan Evangelista Venegas 2010. In his debut, he defeated Eddie Valenzuela of Guatemala by points (11:2). In the finals he was matched against his predecessor, 2008 AIBA Youth World Champion and senior Puerto Rico National Flyweight Champion, Jonathan González. Rodríguez used a defensive strategy, while González was the aggressor. Employing his counter punching, he was able to gain an advantage of 3 points, while González focused on punches to the body, that are generally not scored under AIBA regulation. Rodríguez closed the contest ahead 4:1, winning the first encounter between Puerto Rico's most recent Youth medalists. Despite this result, González was selected to be part of the national team assembled for the 2010 Central American and Caribbean Games. This was due to recommendations made by the amateur boxing federation and High Performance Department, who wanted Rodríguez to have an uninterrupted preparation for the upcoming event. He was selected to be Puerto Rico's Olympic flag-bearer at the Youth Olympic Games, receiving the flag from David Bernier, president of the COPUR. In his debut, Rodríguez defeated Vasily Vetkin of Russia by points, finishing with scores of 11:4 after an even start. In the semifinals, he fought in a rematch against Abdelaal. Rodríguez was ahead in the scores throughout the fight, finishing the first round ahead 3:0, scoring two more points in the second and six in the third. Abdelaal was only able to score once during the second round, for a final score of 11:1. The other boxer to advance was DJ Maaki of Nauru. Rodríguez opened the final fight ahead 9:1 after the first round, scoring thrice in the second and thrice in the third before the referee stopped the contest in his favor at the 1:34 mark. This was Puerto Rico's first Olympic gold medal, the fact that it was won by a boxer in the national team's first participation in the competition mimics the feat accomplished by Juan Evangelista Venegas, who won bronze in the delegation's debut at the 1948 Summer Olympics. Rodríguez returned to the archipelago five days later, receiving recognitions from the COPUR and municipal government of Vega Baja for his performance. Subsequently, a request for inclusion in the High Performance Full-Time Athlete Program was sent to the government, citing an exception to the standard rule, which was drafted to include medalists at the Pan American Games, World Championships or senior Olympics.

=== Immolation and recovery ===
On November 12, 2010, Rodríguez was involved in an incident where a pickup truck was partially damaged. He and a companion were burned, being initially attended at a hospital in Vega Baja, before both were transferred to the specialized burn care unit of Centro Médico in San Juan, where he was placed in preventive intubation to ease the stress on his lungs. Rodríguez suffered second degree burns in approximately 66% of his body, most of the damage focusing in his back and legs. Due to the incident, Rodríguez was removed from a scheduled dual, but was kept among the recipients of a grant issued by the COPUR. By late December he was already training two to three days per week, while admitted in the burn unit and still wearing bandages around one of his arms and both legs. His trainer, Orlando Rodríguez, noted that this was the first time that he worked with a pugilist while still recovering in a hospital. Consequently, a special regime was prepared to work on his footwork, speed and strength, while including other standard practices such as shadow boxing and pads. In his first interview since the incident, Rodríguez noted that he intended to focus on his career and education from that point onwards, severing ties with any negative influence. The following week, the possibility of infection was dismissed by the medical personnel, who allowed more contact with external items, including haircutting tools. Upon being released, the original plan was to participate in the qualification of the 2011 Pan American Games, but he received a negative report from Enrique Amy, chief doctor of the COPUR's Anti-Doping Commission. The amateur boxing federation followed the recommendation. Consequently, Rodríguez spent several months of additional recovery, focused on treatment to avoid re-injuring or infecting the scar tissue in his left arm.

=== Return and Olympic qualification events ===
On September 14, 2011, Rodríguez made his official in-ring return at the V Copa Ángel "Cholo" Espada, competing within the super flyweight division. He went on to dominate the tournament, winning his first two contests following the incident with scores of 12:2 and RSC-3. On December 17, 2011, Rodríguez won the flyweight senior national championship, defeating Juan Carlos López in the tournament finals, 19:3. He had previously advanced over Michael del Valle (18:4) in the semifinals. Rodríguez entered the 2012 Torneo de Boxeo Aficionado Isaac Barrientos, which was a qualifier for the Olympic national boxing team. He advanced to the semifinals, but lost to 17-year-old Jeyvier Cintrón by a single point, mirroring his own ascension over González. Rodríguez then entered the Copa Independencia in the Dominican Republic, but lost his fight against Eddie Valenzuela due to injury (RSCI) in the third round. In this tournament Cintrón went on to win the bronze medal. A rematch took place on April 7, 2012, in which Cintrón defeated Rodríguez with a largest margin of 10:3. Unable to complete the Olympic cycle, he decided to close his amateur career and enter the professional ranks. Rodríguez trained for two months to transition and adjust to the difference in styles.

== Professional career ==
=== Early career ===
Rodríguez turned pro on June 1, 2012, in the undercard of a Puerto Rico Best Boxing event, in which he defeated Jason Agosto by knockout in the first round. In his second appearance, he defeated Jaime González by technical knockout in two rounds. Rodríguez continued performing in the undercard of other boxers, earning consecutive knockouts over Luis Ortiz and José Ruiz. His first decision win was over Ramón Emilio Cedaño, in a fight that was contested in the bantamweight limit of 118 pounds. In a card held at the Dominican Republic, Rodríguez countered the aggression of Edward Vargas to score a third-round technical knockout. Competing in the undercard of José Pedraza's homecoming event, he defeated Felipe Rivas by unanimous decision. On December 21, 2013, Rodríguez won a unanimous decision over former super flyweight world title challenger David Quijano. On April 5, 2014, Rodríguez won a unanimous decision against Félix Pérez.

==== Secondary titleholder ====
Rodríguez faced Miguel Cartagena for the vacant WBO Latino bantamweight title on October 18, 2014, at the Cosme Beitia Sálamo Coliseum in Cataño, Puerto Rico. He won the fight by a first-round knockout, stopping Cartagena at the midway point of the round. Rodríguez made the first defense of his secondary WBO title against Gábor Molnár on February 21, 2015, at the Francisco Deyda Coliseum in Hatillo, Puerto Rico. He won the fight by a second-round technical knockout. Rodríguez knocked Molnár a total of four times, twice in each round, before referee Roberto Ramirez Sr waved the fight off. Rodríguez made his second title defense against Luis Hinojosa on May 30, 2015, at the Cosme Beitia Sálamo Coliseum in Cataño, Puerto Rico. He won the fight by a third-round knockout, flooring Hinojosa with a right straight.

Rodríguez faced Alex Rangel for the vacant WBA Fedelatin and WBC interim Latino bantamweight titles on August 22, 2015. He won the fight by a seventh-round knockout. He made the first defense of his newly acquired titles against Eliecer Aquino on November 25, 2015. He won the fight by a seventh-round technical knockout. After successfully making his first title defenses, Rodríguez fought in two non-title bouts. He first won a unanimous decision against Alberto Guevara on June 3, 2016, before notching a first-round knockout victory against Robinson Laviñanza on March 25, 2017. Rodríguez made his second WBC Latino bantamweight title defense against Giovanni Delgado on August 5, 2017. Delgado retired from the bout at the end of the fourth round.

=== IBF bantamweight champion ===
==== Rodríguez vs. Butler ====
Butler was scheduled face the former IBF bantamweight champion Paul Butler for the vacant IBF bantamweight title on May 5, 2018, at The O2 Arena, on the undercard of the Tony Bellew and David Haye cruiserweight rematch. Butler missed weight prior to the bout, which left him ineligible to win the vacant belt. He weighed in at 121.5 pounds, 3.5 pounds over the championship limit. Butler furthermore refused to weigh himself in a second attempt. Rodríguez won the fight by a dominant unanimous decision, with scores of 118–108, 120–106, 120–106. Butler was knocked down twice in the final minute of the first round. Rodríguez first knocked Butler down with a left hook, and dropped him with a flurry of punches shortly after the action resumed. Butler was able to survive until the end of the round, but failed to achieve much in the remaining eleven rounds.

==== 2018–19 World Boxing Super Series ====
Rodríguez took part in the second season of the World Boxing Super Series, the quarterfinals of which took place in October 2018 and November 2019, and focused on the bantamweight division. He faced the IBF mandatory bantamweight title challenger Jason Moloney in the tournament quarterfinals, which were held on October 20, 2018, at the Addition Financial Arena in Orlando, Florida. He won the fight by split decision. Two of the judges scored the fight 115-113 for Rodríguez, while the third judge gave Moloney the identical scorecard.

Rodríguez advanced to the tournament semifinals, where he faced the undefeated Naoya Inoue. Their bout was scheduled for May 18, 2019, and took place at the OVO Hydro in Glasgow, Scotland. On 3 May, The Ring Magazine, announced their vacant bantamweight title would be at stake. At the time, WBO champion Zolani Tete, who was ranked #2 with The Ring, withdrew from the tournament with injury. Editor-in-Chief, Doug Fischer, explained with Inoue and Rodríguez ranked #1 and #3, respectively, the bout was worthy of being for the title, as both had earned their positions in the rankings. Inoue won the fight by a second-round knockout. Rodríguez was first knocked down with a left hook to the chin, before being dropped once again with a body shot. Although he was able to rise from the canvas for the second time, Inoue managed to drop Rodríguez with a flurry of punches for his third knockdown of the second round, which prompted referee Michael Alexander to stop the fight.

=== Continued bantamweight career ===
==== Rodríguez vs. Gaballo ====
Rodríguez faced Reymart Gaballo for the vacant WBC interim bantamweight title, with the winner of the bout being expected to challenge the reigning world titleholder Nonito Donaire in the future. The title bout was scheduled for December 19, 2020, and was held at the Mohegan Sun Arena in Montville, Connecticut. Rodríguez entered the fight as a slight -135 to -170 favorite to win, although certain observers predicted a Gaballo victory. Rodríguez lost the fight by a controversial split decision, with judge David Sutherland scoring the bout 118-110 for Rodríguez, while judges Don Trella and John McKaie scored it 116-112 and 115-113 for Gaballo, respectively. Rodríguez was disappointed with the fight result, stating: "“It was a good fight, but he only won about two or three rounds... Everyone knows we won". The majority of media members scored the fight for Rodríguez. Immediately after the fight, Rodríguez's team announced their intentions to appeal the decision. Although the WBC ordered a rematch for the interim title, nothing came of it, as the WBC later approved the Gaballo - Donaire world title fight.

==== Rodríguez vs. Russel ====
Rodríguez faced the undefeated Gary Antonio Russell on August 14, 2021, at the Dignity Health Sports Park in Carson, California. Rodríguez entered the Showtime broadcast bout as a slight +155 underdog. The fight failed to produce a winner however, as referee Sharon Sands ruled the bout a no contest after just 16 seconds. An accidental clash of heads opened a cut on the bridge of Rodríguez's nose, which rendered him unable to continue fighting. CompuBox credited Russell with one punch landed and Rodríguez with zero. Both fighters later expressed their desire for a rematch.

Rodríguez faced the one-time WBC International and FECARBOX title challenger Roberto Sanchez Cantu on March 25, 2022, in the main event of the "Estilo Mexicano Box" card which took place at the Polideportivo Juan S. Millan in Culiacán, Mexico. He made quick work of his opponent, stopping him by technical knockout in the last minute of the opening round. Rodríguez first dropped Cantu with a left hook, before forcing his corner to throw in the towel at the 2:22 minute mark with a flurry of punches.

Rodríguez faced the undefeated Gary Antonio Russell on October 15, 2022, at the Barclays Center in New York City, New York. The bout was scheduled for the undercard of the Deontay Wilder and Robert Helenius Fox Sports pay per view and was a rematch of their August 14, 2021 meeting, which ended in a no contest after just 16 seconds. It also served as a WBA and IBF bantamweight title eliminator. He won the fight by a tenth-round technical decision, with scores of 100–90, 99–91 and 99–93. The fight was stopped two seconds into the tenth round, on the advice of the ringside physician, as he deemed Rodríguez unable to continue competing due to a headbutt he suffered in the previous round. Rodríguez had suffered another foul in the eight round as well, as Russell hit him below the beltline. After being given time to recover, Rodríguez would score the sole knockdown of the fight with a few seconds left to spare, flooring his opponent with a counter right.

=== Second IBF bantamweight title reign ===
==== Rodríguez vs. Lopez ====
On February 1, 2023, it was revealed that a vacant bantamweight title fight between Rodríguez and Vincent Astrolabio was ordered by the IBF. The order was abandoned on February 28, as Astrolabio chose to pursue a fight with Jason Moloney for the vacant WBO bantamweight championship. Rodríguez was ordered to face the #4 ranked IBF bantamweight Melvin Lopez for the vacant belt instead. The fight took place on August 12, 2023, at the MGM National Harbor on Oxon Hill, Maryland. Rodríguez won the fight by unanimous decision to become a two-time IBF bantamweight champion. He thrice knocked Lopez down in the twelfth round to earn a 120–105 scorecard from all three ringside officials. He earned a reported $75,000 for the fight. Rodríguez announced his retirement from the sport through a Facebook post on October 17, 2023. He retracted this statement a week later, as he wrote: "The issue of retirement was because at the end of the day the fight against López did not benefit me financially. They had offered me an amount of money that was not what they later wanted to give me and I am not in a position to accept what they wanted to give me. I was upset".

==== Rodríguez vs. Nishida ====
Rodríguez next made a mandatory title defense against the #1 ranked IBF bantamweight contender Ryosuke Nishida. As the two camps weren't able to reach an agreement, a purse bid was organized by the sanctioning body and held on January 26, 2024. It was won by Kameda Promotions with a bid of $300,010 to outpace Rodríguez's Fresh Productions Boxing who bid $250,000. The championship bout took place at the EDION Arena in Osaka, Japan on May 4, 2024. Despite entering the contest as a favorite, Rodríguez lost the fight by unanimous decision, with three scorecards of 117–110, 115–112 and 115–112 in favor of the challenger. Rodríguez was knocked down early on in the fight, with a left hook to the body midway through round four.

== Professional boxing record ==
27 fights	23 wins	3 losses
By knockout	13	1
By decision	10	2
No contests	1	

No.	Result	Record	Opponent	Type	Round, time	Date	Location	Notes
27	Win	23–3 (1)	Fernando Diaz	UD	10	Jan 10, 2026	Barclays Center, New York City, New York, U.S.	
26	Loss	22–3 (1)	Ryosuke Nishida	UD	12	4 May 2024	EDION Arena Osaka, Osaka, Japan	Lost IBF bantamweight title
25	Win	22–2 (1)	Melvin Lopez	UD	12	Aug 12, 2023	MGM National Harbor, Oxon Hill, Maryland, U.S.	Won vacant IBF bantamweight title
24	Win	21–2 (1)	Gary Antonio Russell	TD	10 (12), 0:02	Oct 15, 2022	Barclays Center, New York City, New York, U.S.	Rodriguez unable to continue after accidental head clash
23	Win	20–2 (1)	Roberto Sanchez Cantu	KO	1 (10), 2:22	Mar 25, 2022	Polideportivo Juan S. Millan, Culiacan, Mexico	
22	NC	19–2 (1)	Gary Antonio Russell	NC	1 (12), 0:16	Aug 14, 2021	Dignity Health Sports Park, Carson, California, U.S.	Rodríguez unable to continue after accidental head clash
21	Loss	19–2	Reymart Gaballo	SD	12	Dec 19, 2020	Mohegan Sun Arena, Montville, Connecticut, U.S.	For vacant WBC interim bantamweight title
20	Loss	19–1	Naoya Inoue	KO	2 (12), 1:20	May 18, 2019	SSE Hydro, Glasgow, Scotland	Lost IBF bantamweight title; For WBA (Unified) and vacant The Ring bantamweight title; World Boxing Super Series: bantamweight semi-final
19	Win	19–0	Jason Moloney	SD	12	Oct 20, 2018	CFE Arena, Orlando, Florida, U.S.	Retained IBF bantamweight title; World Boxing Super Series: bantamweight quarter-final
18	Win	18–0	Paul Butler	UD	12	May 5, 2018	The O2 Arena, London, England	Won vacant IBF bantamweight title
17	Win	17–0	Giovanni Delgado	RTD	4 (10), 3:00	Aug 5, 2017	Coliseo Ecuestral Municipal, Fajardo, Puerto Rico	Retained WBC Latino bantamweight title
16	Win	16–0	Robinson Laviñanza	KO	1 (10), 2:21	Mar 25, 2017	Parque Concepción Pérez Alberto, Fajardo, Puerto Rico	
15	Win	15–0	Alberto Guevara	UD	10	Jun 3, 2016	Seminole Hard Rock Hotel & Casino, Hollywood, Florida, U.S.	
14	Win	14–0	Eliecer Aquino	TKO	7 (10), 2:44	Nov 25, 2015	Park Race Track, Hialeah, Florida, U.S.	Retained WBA Fedelatin and WBC Latino bantamweight titles
13	Win	13–0	Alex Rangel	KO	7 (10), 0:44	Aug 22, 2015	Tomás Dones Coliseum, Fajardo, Puerto Rico	Won vacant WBA Fedelatin and WBC interim Latino bantamweight titles
12	Win	12–0	Luis Hinojosa	KO	3 (10), 1:04	May 30, 2015	Cosme Beitia Sálamo Coliseum, Cataño, Puerto Rico	Retained WBO Latino bantamweight title
11	Win	11–0	Gábor Molnár	TKO	2 (10), 1:03	Feb 21, 2015	Francisco Deyda Coliseum, Hatillo, Puerto Rico	Retained WBO Latino bantamweight title
10	Win	10–0	Miguel Cartagena	KO	1 (10), 1:49	Oct 18, 2014	Cosme Beitia Sálamo Coliseum, Cataño, Puerto Rico	Won vacant WBO Latino bantamweight title
9	Win	9–0	Félix Pérez	UD	8	Apr 5, 2014	Moisés Navedo Coliseum, Vega Baja, Puerto Rico	
8	Win	8–0	David Quijano	UD	8	Dec 21, 2013	Cosme Beitía Sálamo Coliseum, Cataño, Puerto Rico	
7	Win	7–0	Felipe Rivas	UD	6	Oct 26, 2013	Jesús M. Freire Stadium, Cidra, Puerto Rico	
6	Win	6–0	Edward Vargas	TKO	3 (4), 0:42	Aug 24, 2013	Pedro Julio Nolasco Coliseum, La Romana, Dominican Republic	
5	Win	5–0	Ramón Emilio Cedaño	UD	4	Jun 22, 2013	Pedro Julio Nolasco Coliseum, La Romana, Dominican Republic	
4	Win	4–0	José Ruiz	TKO	6 (6), 2:08	Apr 6, 2013	Guillermo Angulo Coliseum, Carolina, Puerto Rico	
3	Win	3–0	Luis Ortiz	KO	4 (4), 1:36	Aug 31, 2012	Guillermo Angulo Coliseum, Carolina, Puerto Rico	
2	Win	2–0	Jaime González	TKO	2 (4), 2:48	Jul 7, 2012	Antonio R. Barceló Coliseum, Toa Baja, Puerto Rico	
1	Win	1–0	Jason Agosto	TKO	1 (4), 2:28	Jun 1, 2012	Cancha Mario Jiménez, Guaynabo, Puerto Rico	

== See also ==
- List of Puerto Ricans
- Sports in Puerto Rico
- List of world bantamweight boxing champions
- List of Puerto Rican boxing world champions

Sporting positions
World boxing titles
Vacant Title last held by Ryan Burnett	IBF bantamweight champion May 5, 2018 – May 18, 2019	Succeeded by Naoya Inoue
Vacant Title last held by Naoya Inoue	IBF bantamweight champion August 12, 2023 – May 4, 2024	Succeeded by Ryosuke Nishida
