= Zhanat Zhakiyanov =

Kazakhstani boxer (born 1983)

Zhanat Zhakiyanov Жанат Жакиянов
Personal information
- Nickname: ZZ
- Nationality: Kazakh
- Born: Жанат Ескендирулы Жакиянов; November 4, 1983 (age 42) Blagoveshchenka, Jambyl Region, Kazakh SSR (now Kazakhstan)
- Height: 5 ft 7 in (170 cm)
- Weight: Bantamweight

Boxing career
- Reach: 67 in (170 cm)
- Stance: Orthodox

Boxing record
- Total fights: 29
- Wins: 27
- Win by KO: 18
- Losses: 2

Zhanat Eskendiruly Zhakiyanov (Kazakh: Жанат Ескендирулы Жакиянов; born 4 November 1983) is a Kazakh former professional boxer who competed from 2007 to 2017. He held the WBA (Undisputed) and IBO bantamweight titles in 2017.

== Professional career ==
Zhakiyanov has been trained by former light-welterweight unified world champion Ricky Hatton since 2013. Zhakiyanov is known for his high workrate and punching power.

=== Zhakiyanov vs. Kadirov ===
Zhakiyanov made his professional debut in August 2007, defeating Nabi Kadirov by unanimous decision on Shymkent.

=== Zhakiyanov vs. Usarov ===
Zhakiyanov suffered his first lost against Sakhib Usarov on his fifth fight.

=== Zhakiyanov vs. Abdurahimov ===
On 2010, Zhakiyanov claimed the ABCO bantamweight title with a unanimous decision over Bahyt Abdurahimov.

=== Zhakyanov vs. Guerfi ===
Zhakiyanov then defeated Karim Guerfi to win the EBU bantamweight title. Guerfi built a lead on the scorecards but Zhakiyanov knocked him out with a right hand at the end of round 5.

=== Zhakiyanov vs. Edisherasvhili ===
In September 2014, Zhakiyanov defeated Gagi Edisherashvili with a first-round knockout. The fight marked his tenth consecutive stoppage win.

=== Zhakiyanov vs. Guzman ===
Zhakiyanov defeated Héctor Guzmán for the WBA International title. Both fighters showed technical deficiencies during the fight, throwing wide, looping punches. Guzmán went down in round 1 and Zhakiyanov went down in round 2, but Zhakiyanov won the fight with a round-6 knockout. In November 2015, he defeated Yonfrez Parejo by split decision (116-113, 115–113, 112–116) for the WBA interim title. The fight halted Zhakiyanov's 12-fight knockout streak.

=== Zhakiyanov vs. Warren ===
In February 2017, Zhakiyanov defeated Rau'shee Warren to win the WBA world title. Zhakiyanov went down twice in round 1, but outworked Warren throughout the rest of the fight and knocked him down in round 3, but the referee ruled it a slip. Zhakiyanov won the fight by split decision (116-110, 115–111, 111–115).

=== Zhakyanov vs. Burnett ===
In August 2017, it was announced that Zhakiyanov would face IBF bantamweight titlist Ryan Burnett on 21 October 2017. Both fighters would be defending their respective world title for the first time against each other. Burnett and Zhakiyanov had previously trained in Hatton's gym together. On fight night, Burnett won a unanimous decision (119-109, 118–110, 117–112) after a tense fight that saw him and Zhakiyanov trade blows in close quarters for most of the twelve rounds.

== Professional boxing record ==
29 fights	27 wins	2 losses
By knockout	18	0
By decision	9	2

No.	Result	Record	Opponent	Type	Round, time	Date	Location	Notes
29	Loss	27–2	(United Kingdom) Ryan Burnett	UD	12	Oct 21, 2017	(United Kingdom) SSE Arena, Belfast, Northern Ireland	Lost WBA (Undisputed) bantamweight title; For IBF bantamweight title
28	Win	27–1	(United States) Rau'shee Warren	SD	12	Feb 10, 2017	(United States) Huntington Center, Toledo, Ohio, US	Won WBA (Undisputed) bantamweight title
27	Win	26–1	(Venezuela) Yonfrez Parejo	SD	12	Nov 7, 2015	Salle des Etoiles, Monte Carlo, Monaco	Won WBA interim bantamweight title
26	Win	25–1	(Argentina) Héctor Guzmán	KO	6 (12)	May 9, 2015	Gymnasium of Natural Sciences and Mathematics, Vratsa, Bulgaria	Won vacant WBA International bantamweight title
25	Win	24–1	(Philippines) Roberto Lerio	KO	2 (10), 1:16	Nov 8, 2014	Sleeman Sports Complex, Chandler, Australia	
24	Win	23–1	(Georgia (country)) Gagi Edisherashvili	KO	1 (10), 2:29	Sep 10, 2014	Moulin Rouge Club, Minsk, Belarus	Won vacant WBC Eurasia Pacific bantamweight title
23	Win	22–1	(France) Karim Guerfi	KO	5 (12), 2:39	Apr 26, 2014	(United Kingdom) Ponds Forge Arena, Sheffield, Yorkshire, UK	Won European bantamweight title
22	Win	21–1	(Belarus) Yuriy Voronin	TKO	7 (8), 0:25	Jul 16, 2013	Moulin Rouge Club, Minsk, Belarus	
21	Win	20–1	(Nicaragua) Michael Escobar	TKO	4 (6), 2:04	Jun 28, 2013	(United Kingdom) Holiday Inn, Belfast, Northern Ireland	
20	Win	19–1	(Indonesia) Erick Diaz Siregar	KO	2 (8), 1:03	Dec 11, 2012	Convention and Exhibition Centre, Hong Kong	
19	Win	18–1	(Kyrgyzstan) Timur Shailezov	TKO	3 (10), 2:50	May 25, 2012	Restaurant Rukia, Shymkent, Kazakhstan	
18	Win	17–1	(Thailand) Lookdiew Sithkruluor	KO	1 (10), 2:00	Jan 27, 2012	Sports Palace Zhenis, Petropavl, Kazakhstan	Retained ABCO Continental bantamweight title
17	Win	16–1	(Belarus) Dzmitri Agafonau	TKO	2 (8)	Nov 3, 2011	Gagarin Club, Minsk, Belarus	
16	Win	15–1	(Kuwait) Anwar Alfadli	TKO	5 (6), 1:25	Aug 19, 2011	(United Kingdom) Tower Circus, Blackpool, England	
15	Win	14–1	(Switzerland) Benjamin Pitteloud	TKO	2 (12), 2:20	May 20, 2011	Salle du Bourg, Martigny, Switzerland	Won vacant EBU European External bantamweight title
14	Win	13–1	(Uzbekistan) Bahyt Abdurahimov	UD	10	Dec 11, 2010	Tashkent, Uzbekistan	Won vacant ABCO Continental bantamweight title
13	Win	12–1	(Thailand) Petchmuangnon Sor Poonsawat	PTS	6	Aug 27, 2010	E-sarn University, Khon Kaen, Thailand	
12	Win	11–1	(Thailand) Kong Kiatpracha	TKO	2 (6), 1:44	Aug 6, 2010	Light Infantry Boxing Arena, Bangkok, Thailand	
11	Win	10–1	(Georgia (country)) Khvicha Papiashvili	TKO	2 (6), 2:27	Nov 28, 2009	Kazakh State Circus, Almaty, Kazakhstan	
10	Win	9–1	(Indonesia) Boido Simanjuntak	KO	2 (6)	May 30, 2009	Kazakh State Circus, Almaty, Kazakhstan	
9	Win	8–1	(Russia) Alexander Fedorov	UD	8	Apr 17, 2009	Sports Palace "Dostyk", Almaty, Kazakhstan	
8	Win	7–1	(Philippines) Richard Agagad	UD	6	Mar 7, 2009	Ablay Khan Sports Club, Almaty, Kazakhstan	
7	Win	6–1	(Kyrgyzstan) Rustam Abdullaev	TKO	4 (6)	Oct 29, 2008	Club "OQ-TEPA", Tashkent, Uzbekistan	
6	Loss	5–1	(Russia) Sakhib Usarov	UD	8	Oct 4, 2008	Borisoglebsky Sports Palace, Ramenskoye, Russia	
5	Win	5–0	(Uzbekistan) Bahyt Abdurahimov	UD	4	Jun 24, 2008	Shymkent, Kazakhstan	
4	Win	4–0	(Kazakhstan) Bekzat Tampiyev	TKO	3 (4)	Apr 19, 2009	Kazakh State Circus, Almaty, Kazakhstan	
3	Win	3–0	(Uzbekistan) Bahyt Abdurahimov	UD	4	Feb 15, 2008	Sports Palace "Dostyk", Almaty, Kazakhstan	
2	Win	2–0	(Kazakhstan) Samat Kulbayev	RTD	3 (4)	Aug 13, 2007	Shymkent, Kazakhstan	
1	Win	1–0	(Kazakhstan) Nabi Kadirov	UD	4	Aug 3, 2007	Shymkent, Kazakhstan	

Sporting positions
World titles
Preceded by Yonfrez Parejo	WBA bantamweight champion Interim title November 7, 2015 - February 10, 2017 won full title	Vacant Title next held by Reymart Gaballo
Preceded by Rau'shee Warren	WBA bantamweight champion Undisputed title February 10, 2017 – October 21, 2017	Succeeded by Ryan Burnett
