= 2018–19 World Boxing Super Series – bantamweight division =

Boxing competition

The 2018–19 World Boxing Super Series – bantamweight division is a World Boxing Super Series professional boxing tournament took place between October 2018 and November 2019 in several countries. The Super Series features 8 top-rated bantamweight boxers in a single-elimination tournament. The tournament was organized by Comosa AG.

== Participants ==
Rating^{1}	Boxer	Record^{2}	Stance	Height	Age^{2}	World titles^{2}
3	Zolani Tete (RSA)	27–3–0	Southpaw	1.75 m (5 ft 9 in)	March 8, 1988 (aged 30)	WBO World Champion
2	Ryan Burnett (UK)	19–0–0	Orthodox	1.63 m (5 ft 4 in)	May 21, 1992 (aged 26)	WBA (Super) World Champion
7	Emmanuel Rodríguez (PUR)	18–0–0	Orthodox	1.68 m (5 ft 6 in)	August 8, 1992 (aged 26)	IBF World Champion
1	Naoya Inoue (JPN)	16–0–0	Orthodox	1.65 m (5 ft 5 in)	April 10, 1993 (aged 25)	WBA (Regular) World Champion
—N/a	Jason Moloney (AUS)	17–0–0	Orthodox	1.68 m (5 ft 6 in)	January 10, 1991 (aged 27)	
—N/a	Nonito Donaire (PHI)	38–5–0	Orthodox	1.68 m (5 ft 6 in)	November 16, 1982 (aged 35)	
5	Juan Carlos Payano (DOM)	20–1–0	Southpaw	1.65 m (5 ft 5 in)	April 12, 1984 (aged 34)	
—N/a	Mikhail Aloyan (RUS)	4–0–0	Southpaw	1.63 m (5 ft 4 in)	August 23, 1988 (aged 30)	

^1 Transnational Boxing Rankings Board rankings on 11 September 2018, the last archived rankings before the start of the tournament.
^2 Age, records, and titles listed as of the start of the tournament.

- Paul Butler is a tournament reserve fighter.

== Brackets ==
Quarter-finals
Ryan Burnett (UK)
Nonito Donaire (PHI)	RTD 4
Zolani Tete (RSA)	UD 12
Mikhail Aloyan (RUS)
Naoya Inoue (JPN)	KO 1
Juan Carlos Payano (DOM)
Emmanuel Rodríguez (PUR)	SD 12
Jason Moloney (AUS)

Semi-finals
Nonito Donaire (PHI)	KO 6
Stephon Young* (USA)
Naoya Inoue (JPN)	KO 2
Emmanuel Rodríguez (PUR)

Final
Nonito Donaire (PHI)
Naoya Inoue (JPN)	UD 12

_{* Zolani Tete withdrew from the semi-final due to an injury and was replaced by Stephon Young.}

== Quarter-finals ==
The quarterfinals are held from 7 October to 3 November 2018.

7 October 2018	Naoya Inoue (Japan)	KO 1	(Dominican Republic) Juan Carlos Payano	Yokohama Arena, Yokohama, Japan

13 October 2018	Zolani Tete (South Africa)	UD 12	(Russia) Mikhail Aloyan	Expo, Ekaterinburg, Russia

20 October 2018	Emmanuel Rodríguez (Puerto Rico)	SD 12	(Australia) Jason Moloney	CFE Arena, Orlando, FL, United States

3 November 2018	Nonito Donaire (Philippines)	RTD 4	(United Kingdom) Ryan Burnett	SSE Hydro, Glasgow, United Kingdom

== Semi-finals ==
The semifinals will be held in 27 April and 18 May 2019.

27 April 2019	Nonito Donaire (Philippines)	KO 6	(United States) Stephon Young	Cajundome, Lafayette, LA, United States

18 May 2019	Naoya Inoue (Japan)	KO 2	(Puerto Rico) Emmanuel Rodríguez	SSE Hydro, Glasgow, United Kingdom

== Final ==
For WBA (Super), IBF, and The Ring titles.

7 November 2019	Naoya Inoue (Japan)	UD 12	(Philippines) Nonito Donaire	Saitama Super Arena, Saitama, Japan
