= Nonito Donaire =

Filipino professional boxer (born 1982)

Nonito Donaire OL
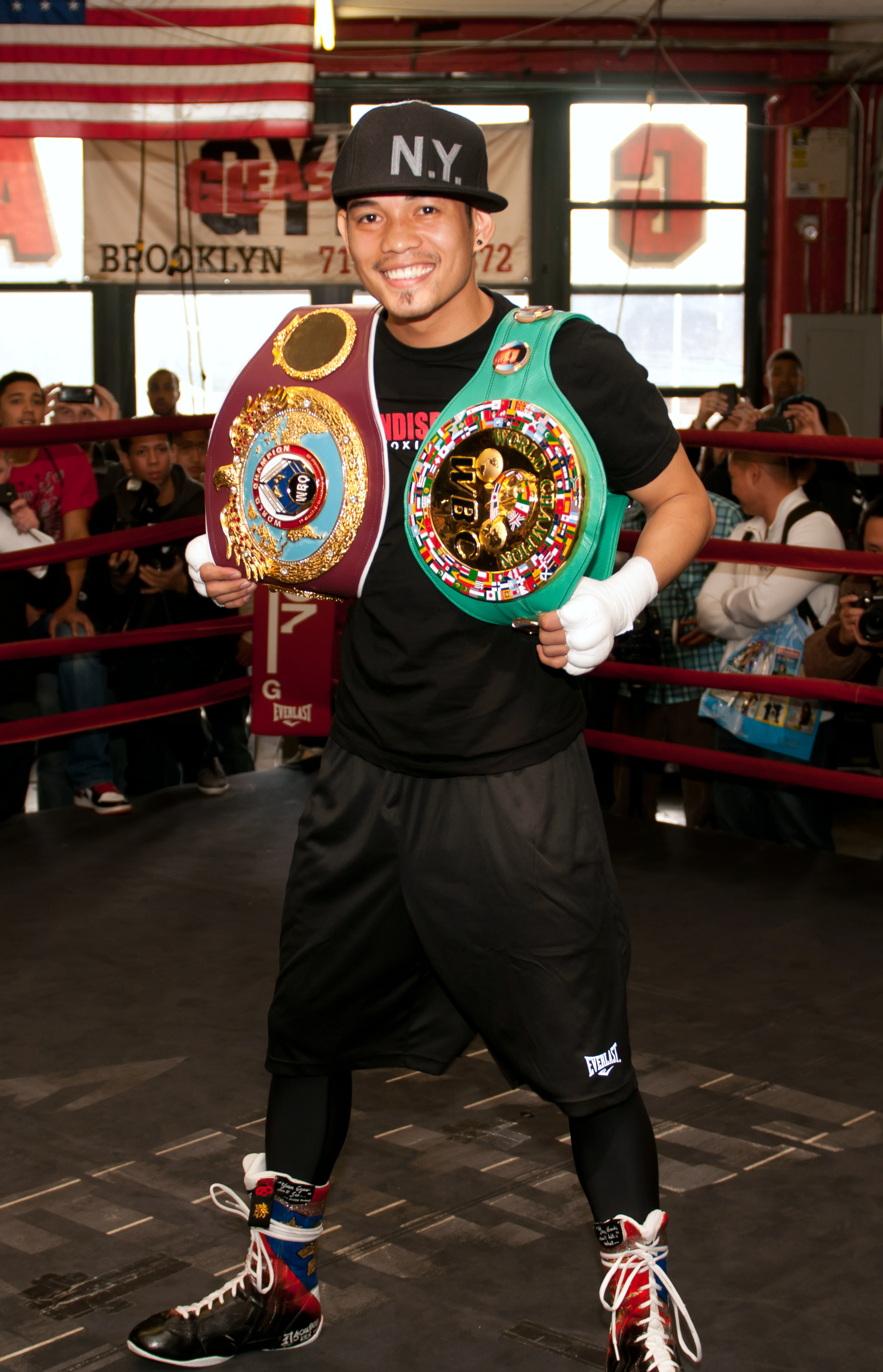
- Donaire with the WBO (brown) and WBC (green) bantamweight titles, 2011

Personal information
- Nickname: The Filipino Flash
- Citizenship: Philippines; United States
- Born: Nonito Gonzales Donaire Jr. November 16, 1982 (age 43) Talibon, Bohol, Philippines
- Height: 5 ft 6 in (168 cm)
- Weight: Flyweight; Super flyweight; Bantamweight; Super bantamweight; Featherweight

Boxing career
- Reach: 68 in (173 cm)
- Stance: Orthodox

Boxing record
- Total fights: 53
- Wins: 43
- Win by KO: 28
- Losses: 10

Nonito Gonzales Donaire Jr. ( Tagalog: [noˈnito gonˈsalɛs doˈnaɪre]; born November 16, 1982) is a Filipino-American professional boxer. He has held multiple world championships in four weight classes, from flyweight to featherweight, and is the oldest boxer in history to win a bantamweight world title (at age 38), as well as being the first three-time champion in that weight class. Donaire has also held world championships in three consecutive decades: the 2000s, 2010s and 2020s, being the sixth boxer to do so after Evander Holyfield, Manny Pacquiao, Bernard Hopkins, Erik Morales, and Floyd Mayweather Jr.

In total, Donaire has held nine world titles by the main four boxing sanctioning bodies. He has also held the International Boxing Organization (IBO) flyweight title, the World Boxing Association (WBA) interim super flyweight title, and the Ring magazine and lineal super bantamweight titles.

Donaire is popularly known as "The Filipino Flash" and is a two-time winner of The Ring's Knockout of the Year award, in 2007 and 2011. He reached a peak pound for pound ranking of third by The Ring in 2011, and was named Fighter of the Year in 2012 by the Boxing Writers Association of America.

== Early life ==
Donaire was born in Talibon, Bohol, Philippines, the third of four children to Nonito C. Donaire Sr. (born 1959, South Cotabato) and Imelda M. Gonzales (born 1950, Talibon). His older brother is former boxer Glenn Donaire, and his cousin is former boxer Richard Donaire.

Until he was six years of age, Donaire lived in General Santos and attended the same school as future eight-division world champion, Manny Pacquiao. Donaire was a child of small stature and was bullied.

Donaire's father was an amateur boxer who competed in the U.S. in the early 1990s. His paternal grandfather was born in Hawaii, and this gave Donaire American citizenship under the principle of jus Sanguinis. In 1993, at the age of eleven, Donaire joined his father in Van Nuys, California. They later lived in San Leandro, California. and San Mateo County, California.

Donaire said that during his childhood he wished for more attention from his parents and, after his brother started boxing, the attention was given to him. This was his reason for entering the sport of boxing at the age of eleven even though he did not enjoy it. His father supported his choice as he felt it would keep Donaire off the streets. During their younger years, Donaire and Glenn would spar. Donaire also watched videos of his hero, Alexis Argüello, and from them he learned to throw a powerful left hook.

While enrolled at the San Lorenzo High School in San Lorenzo, California, both Nonito and Glenn won several regional and district amateur boxing championships. In his first amateur bout, Nonito beat his opponent with straight punches, all the while thinking that "I'm going to kill him before he kills me." However, Donaire had little confidence until he had five professional knockout victories.

== Amateur career ==
As a young amateur, Donaire won three U.S. national championships: the National Silver Gloves (1998), National Junior Olympics (1999) and the National USA Tournament (2000). He also won the 1999 International Junior Olympics gold medal. Donaire's amateur record was 68–8 with 5 technical knockouts (TKOs).

== Professional career ==
In 2001, Donaire and his brother became professional boxers. They signed contracts with a promoter, Jackie Kallen. Donaire was paid a monthly salary of $1,500. In 2001, after a controversial decision, Donaire lost his second fight against Rosendo Sanchez. This impassioned him to win his fights which he did until April 2013. After four professional bouts, Donaire and his brother left their contracts with Kallen and returned to Manila and then to San Leandro, where there were fewer distractions.

=== Early years ===
On September 9, 2002, in Guam, Donaire won his first regional title, the vacant WBO Asia Pacific flyweight title. He knocked out Kaichon Sor Vorapin in the second round. On January 20, 2006, Donaire won his second regional title, the NABF super flyweight title, by defeating Kahren Harutyunyan via split decision (SD) on ShoBox. Two judges scored the bout 97–92 for Donaire while the third scored it 95–94 for Harutyunan. On October 7, 2006, Donaire defeated Oscar Andrade, a veteran boxer, by unanimous decision (UD) with the scorecards reading 118–109, 116–112, and 116–112.

=== Flyweight ===
==== Donaire vs. Darchinyan ====
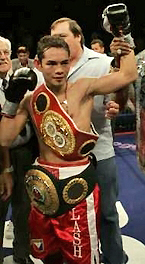
Donaire with the IBF (red) and IBO (black) titles, 2007

On July 7, 2007, Donaire won the IBF and IBO flyweight titles with a one-punch, fifth-round knockout (KO) of the then undefeated Vic Darchinyan. This victory was awarded Ring Magazine's "Knockout of the Year" and "Upset of the Year".

On July 31, 2007, Donaire met Philippine President Gloria Macapagal Arroyo. Donaire said the experience was, "an overwhelming feeling. It was indescribable. The moment I walked up the stairs and she was up there and when I looked it was a moment when I couldn't even look at her face. It was a great honor." Then, on December 1, 2007, Donaire made the first defense of his IBF and IBO titles against Luis Maldonado of Mexico, winning via technical knockout (TKO) in the eighth round. Donaire said, "I guess my validation was today but I didn't feel my best; I felt sluggish. I didn't have my legs. I don't know what the problem was. I couldn't move well so I tried to rely on my upper body movement."

In late June 2008, Donaire severed his association with his promoter, Gary Shaw. Donaire had not been offered the number of fights his contract demanded. Shaw also failed to disclose revenue from fights as demanded by the Muhammad Ali Boxing Reform Act. Days after leaving Gary Shaw Productions, Donaire signed a contract with Top Rank Boxing.

==== Donaire vs. Mthalane ====
On November 2, 2008, Donaire made the second defense of his titles with a sixth-round (1:31) TKO of Moruti Mthalane. Although Donaire's asthma condition was well managed in general, after his illness in the Mthalane fight, Donaire became estranged from his father who did not acknowledge the medical problem.

On April 19, 2009, Donaire faced Raul Martinez, for a third defense of his titles at the Araneta Coliseum in Quezon City, Philippines. Donaire scored a TKO in the fourth round (2:42). For this match, Donaire was trained by the Peñalosa brothers: Gerry, Dodie Boy and Jonathan. After the match, Donaire was recorded in the Ring Magazine pound for pound rankings in seventh position.

=== Super flyweight ===
The International Boxing Federation ordered a rematch between Donaire and the previous challenger, Moruti Mthalane to take place by August 1, 2009. However, Donaire, now 115 pounds (52 kg) wished to move up to the super flyweight division.

==== Donaire vs. Concepción ====
Donaire was to fight Hugo Fidel Cazares on August 15, 2009, but negotiations failed. Rafael Concepción replaced Cazares as Donaire's opponent for the WBA interim super flyweight title Donaire hired a conditioning coach, Mike Bazzel, to assist Dodie Boy and Jonathan Peñalosa in his training at the Undisputed Boxing Gym, San Carlos. Donaire dedicated his fight against Concepcion to the memory of Corazon "Cory" Aquino and requested Everlast, a boxing equipment company, provide a yellow robe with the inscription "I. M. O. (in memory of) former Pres. Cory Aquino." Concepcion failed to weigh in within the super flyweight limit of 115 pounds (52 kg), meaning the title would only be on the line for Donaire. He captured the title via twelve-round UD. After his win, Donaire was honored in a motorcade in Manila organised by Alfredo Lim, the mayor.

In late 2009, Donaire began training under Robert Garcia.

==== Donaire vs. Vargas ====
On February 13, 2010, Donaire fought Manuel Vargas in the first defense of his WBA interim title. The fight took place at the Las Vegas Hilton in Las Vegas, Nevada. Vargas, a late replacement for Gerson Guerrero, had to move up three weight divisions in order to participate. The bout headlined the card titled "Pinoy Power 3." Donaire won the fight with a third-round (1:33) KO.

After the fight, Donaire planned to move up to the bantamweight division and expressed his wish to fight Vic Darchinyan and Fernando Montiel, but neither bout took place.

==== Donaire vs. Márquez ====
Donaire fought his last bout in the super flyweight division against Hernán Márquez. The fight was on the undercard of the Juan Manuel López and Bernabe Concepcion bout on July 10, 2010, at the Coliseo Jose Miguel Agrelot in San Juan, Puerto Rico. Donaire had challenged Eric Morel who declined. Donaire won the match with a TKO in the eighth round.

=== Bantamweight ===
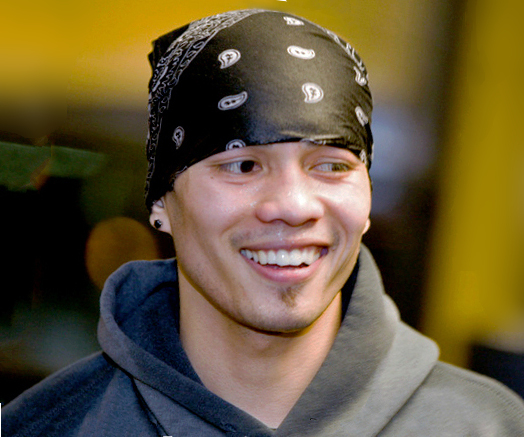
Donaire in 2010

Following his win against Márquez, Donaire stated his intention to compete in the bantamweight division (118 pounds (54 kg)) by challenging unified WBC and WBO champion, Fernando Montiel.

==== Donaire vs. Sydorenko ====
On December 4, 2010, Donaire challenged the former WBA bantamweight champion, Volodymyr Sydorenko for the vacant WBC Continental Americas bantamweight title. Donaire knocked down Sydorenko three times and became the first man to defeat the boxer. The win against Sydorenko gave Donaire the chance to face Montiel.

==== Donaire vs. Montiel ====
On February 19, 2011, Donaire defeated Montiel in the second round to capture the WBC and WBO bantamweight titles. Donaire took a right to the head from Montiel, then immediately countered with a left to the head that knocked his opponent down. Montiel rose to continue before Donaire rushed over to land a left and a right. The referee, Russell Mora, stopped the fight at 2:25 of the second round. (Note: "HBO Boxing: Fernando Montiel vs. Nonito Donaire Highlights (HBO)" HBO Sports, March 1, 2011. Accessed March 7, 2012.) He was given a third place in Ring Magazine's "pound for pound" rankings. Juan Manuel Marquez and Sergio Martínez were ahead of him.

On February 28, 2011, resolutions moved by Pia Cayetano and Manuel Lapid were passed by the senate of the Philippines that Donaire be congratulated and commended for being an outstanding Filipino boxer and for bringing honor and pride to the country.

==== Donaire vs. Narváez ====
On October 22, 2011, Donaire made his New York debut, beating the previously undefeated two-division world champion, Omar Narváez, via UD at Madison Square Garden in New York.

=== Super bantamweight ===
==== Donaire vs. Vázquez Jr. ====
In 2012, Donaire fought Wilfredo Vázquez Jr. After twelve rounds, Donaire had scores of 117–110 and 117–110. Surprisingly, the third judge scored 115–112 in favour of Vázquez Jr. Donaire landed sixty percent of his power shots and out-landed Vázquez Jr in rounds one to five and seven to twelve and was awarded the WBO super bantamweight title. In the ninth round, Vázquez Jr. was knocked down for the first time in his professional career. (Note: "Nonito Donaire." HBO Sports October 1, 2012. Accessed October 13, 2012.)

==== Donaire vs. Mathebula ====
On July 7, 2012, Donaire fought in a unification bout against IBF super bantamweight champion Jeffrey Mathebula. Donaire's progress of 28–1 with 18 knockouts was matched with Mathebula's of 26–3 with two draws and 14 knockouts. It was possible the two boxers' super bantamweight world titles would be unified. The bout was televised live on HBO Boxing After Dark from the Home Depot centre in Carson, California. Donaire defeated Mathebula by UD, knocking him down in round four and breaking his jaw in two places.

==== Donaire vs. Nishioka ====
On October 13, 2012, in Carson, California, Donaire fought Toshiaki Nishioka who had been ranked first in his division by Ring magazine. Donaire officially relinquished the IBF super bantamweight title hours before the fight by declining to participate in the IBF's mandated weight check. When, by the ninth round, Nishioka had been knocked down twice, his cornerman asked the referee to end the fight, handing Donaire a TKO victory to retain his WBO title and capture the vacant Ring magazine super bantamweight title. The purse from this bout and his contract with HBO earned Donaire 800,000 dollars.

==== Donaire vs. Arce ====
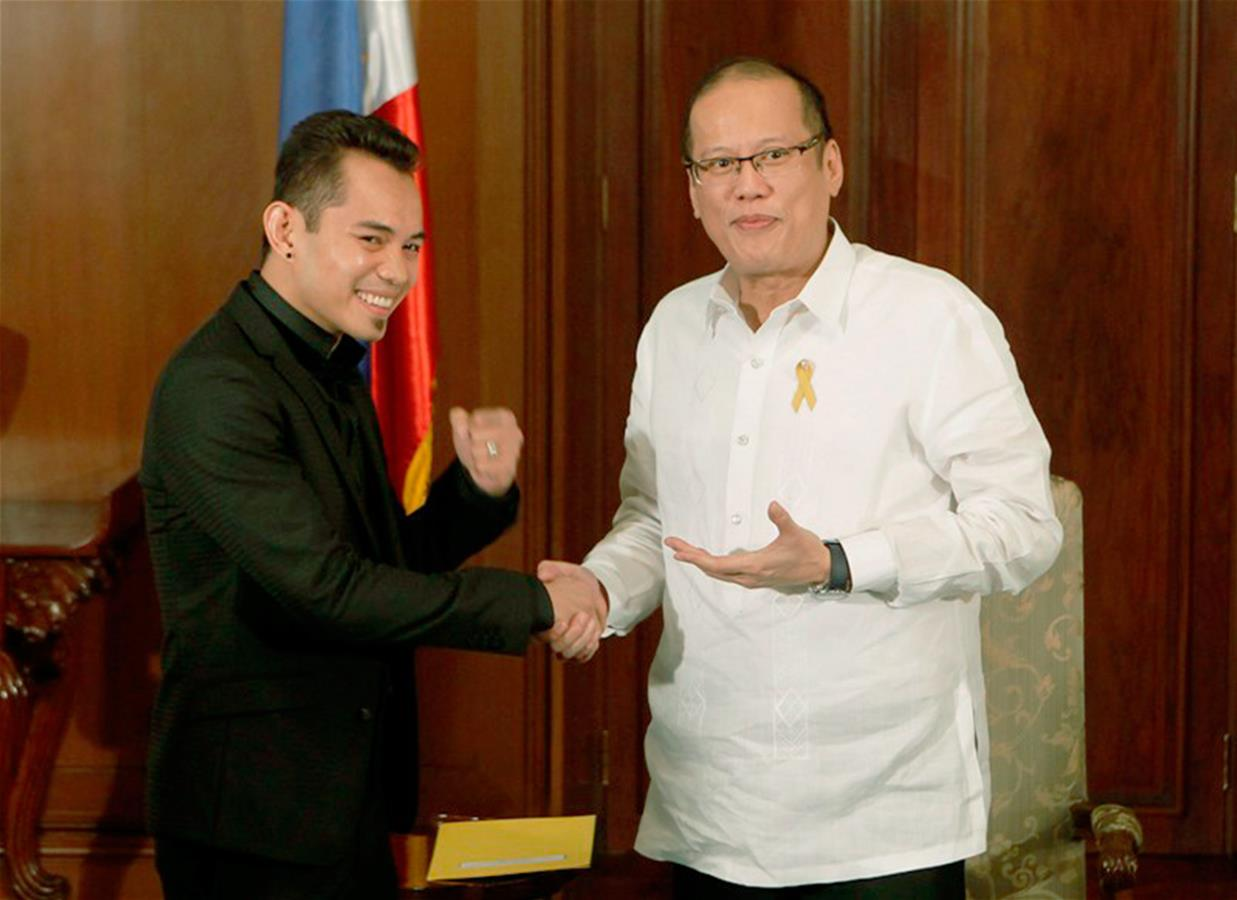
Donaire being congratulated by President Benigno S. Aquino III at Malacañan Palace, 2012

On December 15, 2012, in Houston, Texas, Donaire retained his titles against Jorge Arce with a third-round KO. Donaire had already knocked down Arce in the second and third rounds.

==== Donaire vs. Rigondeaux ====
On April 13, 2013, Donaire fought WBA (Super) champion Guillermo Rigondeaux at Radio City Music Hall in New York. Donaire knocked Rigondeaux down once in the tenth round en route to a UD defeat, losing his WBO and Ring titles and ending his twelve-year winning streak.

=== Featherweight ===
==== Donaire vs. Darchinyan II ====
In November 2013, Donaire fought Vic Darchinyan in non-title fight that was a rematch of their 2007 fight. The bout was on the undercard of a Mikey Garcia vs. Román Martínez. Donaire started strong, but Darchinyan mounted a comeback in the middle rounds to take the lead on two of the official scorecards. However, in the ninth round, Donaire was able to drop Darchinyan with a left hook. Although he was able to beat the count, Darchinyan wasn't able to intelligently defend himself, prompting the referee to stop the fight (2:06).

==== Donaire vs. Vetyeka ====
On May 31, 2014, Donaire fought Simpiwe Vetyeka for the WBA (Super) featherweight title at The Venetian Macao Hotel & Resort's CotaiArena in Macau. Donaire knocked down Vetyeka in the fourth round after landing his signature left hook. The fight was stopped seconds after the bell for the fifth round due to a cut on Donaire's left eye from an accidental head butt. Donaire won the bout via unanimous technical decision (TD). Donaire became the second Filipino (after Manny Pacquiao) to win championships in four weight divisions.

==== Donaire vs. Walters ====
On October 18, 2014, Donaire made the first defense of his WBA (Super) title against undefeated WBA (Regular) champion Nicholas Walters. The fight took place in Carson, California, on the undercard of the Gennady Golovkin vs. Marco Antonio Rubio bout. Donaire started strong and rocked Walters heavily early on, but than was dropped twice later on. Donaire wanted to continue but the referee decided to stopped the fight.

=== Return to super bantamweight ===
On March 28, 2015, Donaire returned to the super bantamweight division and defeated William Prado in two rounds to secure the vacant NABF super bantamweight title at the Araneta Coliseum in the Philippines. A flurried attack had Prado dazed at the end of the first round. Donaire continued his attack at the beginning of the second round and the fight was stopped. On July 18, 2015, Donaire also defeated Anthony Settoul in two rounds via stoppage at The Venetian Macao in Macau.

==== Donaire vs. Juarez ====
On December 11, 2015, Donaire reclaimed the vacant WBO super bantamweight title, defeating Cesar Juarez by UD. The fight was controlled by Donaire early on, dropping the Mexican brawler twice, but Juarez showed good punch resistance to keep going. Donaire began to slow down due to fatigue and an ankle injury, as Juarez picked up the pressure. The latter rounds were much closer as the fight turned into a slugfest and a 'fight of the year' candidate, it ended with both fighters exhausted and swinging wildly at the final bell. Donaire defended the WBO title successfully against Zsolt Bedak via third-round TKO in Cebu City, Philippines on April 23, 2016.

==== Donaire vs. Magdaleno ====
Donaire lost to Jessie Magdaleno by controversial decision. The bout was the co-main event to Manny Pacquiao vs. Jessie Vargas PPV bout on November 5, 2016. This marked the first time Donaire and Pacquiao, the two biggest boxing stars to come out of the Philippines, have ever shared the same card.

=== Return to featherweight ===
On March 8, 2017, Top Rank and Donaire agreed to end their partnership after an eight-year run with only about a month remaining in the contract. On July 25, 2017, Donaire signed with Richard Schaefer's Ringstar Sports.

On September 23, 2017, Donaire returned to featherweight and defeated Ruben Garcia Hernandez via UD to win the vacant WBC Silver featherweight title at the Alamodome in San Antonio, Texas.

==== Donaire vs. Frampton ====
In December 2017, Donaire came up as a potential opponent for Carl Frampton after the announcement from promoter Frank Warren. Negotiations began on December 19, 2017, between Donaire's promoter, Ringstar Sports, and Warren. On December 21, 2017, the fight was officially announced for April 21, 2018, at the SSE Arena, Belfast, Northern Ireland by Warren via the BoxNation Facebook page.

In a close fight Frampton beat Donaire via controversial Unanimous decision. All three judges scored the fight 117–111 for Frampton. Frampton spend most of the fight on the backfoot. In the second half of the fight, Donaire had more success, hurting Frampton on a number of occasions, landing a hard left hook in round eleven. Donaire was cut over his right after an accidental clash of heads in round seven, with the referee failing to call a time-out. After the fight, Frampton said on live television, "I didn't have to get involved in a fight there, as you saw in the last round Nonito Donaire is a dangerous motherfucker." According to CompuBox Stats, Frampton landed 164 of 557 punches thrown (29.4%) and Donaire landed 104 of his 447 thrown (23.3%).

=== Return to bantamweight ===
==== World Boxing Super Series ====
On May 9, 2018, at a news conference in London, the World Boxing Super Series (WBSS) announced that season two would include the bantamweights.

==== Donaire vs. Burnett ====
The draft gala for the WBSS took place in Moscow on July 20, 2018. Donaire was chosen by top-seeded Ryan Burnett as his opponent in the quarter finals. On September 7, 2018, the WBSS announced a doubleheader would take place at The SSE Hydro in Glasgow on November 3, 2018. The card would see Burnett vs. Donaire as well as the quarter final fight from the super-lightweight tournament which would see Josh Taylor go up against Ryan Martin.

Burnett looked to have taken the first two rounds as Donaire reset on the third and began to box smarter. During the third round, Burnett received a counter left-hook to the body and felt the after effects. During the fourth round, Burnett reached for his lower back after throwing a combination of punches, an exchange which was counted as a knock down for Donaire. Burnett survived the round but failed to answer the bell for round five. Donaire showed respect to Burnett by going straight to Burnett's corner to give him some words of encouragement instead of celebrating. Donaire captured the WBA (Super) bantamweight title and moved on to the semifinals of the WBSS to face WBO champion Zolani Tete.

==== Donaire vs. Young ====
On April 27, 2019, Nonito Donaire faced #5-ranked WBA contender Stephon Young, a last-minute replacement for Tete, who had to withdraw from the bout out due to a shoulder injury. The fight was held at the Cajundome in Lafayette, Louisiana, and the winner was set to face either WBA (Regular) bantamweight champion Naoya Inoue or IBF bantamweight champion Emmanuel Rodríguez.

Donaire made use of his jab to outbox Young in the succeeding rounds and put a final stamp in the sixth round with a counter-left hook that landed flush on Young's jaw, immediately knocking him out.

==== Donaire vs. Inoue ====
On November 8, 2019, Donaire faced Naoya Inoue for the WBSS final in Japan. Donaire lost his title and the bout by UD. During the second round, Donaire opened a cut above Inoue's right eye after landing a left hook. In the eleventh round, Donaire was knocked down after absorbing a body shot. The bout was scored 117–109, 116–111, and 114–113 in favor of Inoue. After the fight, Donaire and Inoue showed each other mutual respect, with Inoue lauding Donaire as "a true champion." The fight was later voted the Ring magazine Fight of the Year.

==== Cancelled fight with Rodríguez ====
Donaire was scheduled to face Emmanuel Rodríguez for the WBC bantamweight title on December 19, 2020, at the Mohegan Sun Arena in Montville, Connecticut. On December 10 it was reported that Donaire tested positive for COVID-19, forcing him to withdraw from the bout. He was originally scheduled to face Nordine Oubaali, who was replaced by Rodríguez after Oubaali also tested positive for COVID-19. Reymart Gaballo, who was also scheduled to fight on the same day against Jose Velasquez of Chile, substituted for Donaire and will fight Rodríguez for the WBC interim title.

==== Donaire vs. Oubaali ====
On May 29, 2021, Donaire faced Nordine Oubaali for the WBC bantamweight title at the Dignity Health Sports Park in Carson, California. Donaire scored a knockdown twice in the third round before finishing the bout in the fourth round with a hook-straight-uppercut combination. The referee waived off the count awarding Donaire with the win and making him the oldest fighter to win a world championship in the bantamweight division at the age of 38.

==== Cancelled fight with John Riel Casimero ====
On June 19, 2021, it was announced that Donaire would replace Guillermo Rigondeaux to face WBO bantamweight champion John Riel Casimero on August 14 in a unification bout. However, on June 30, Donaire announced that he would be pulling out of the fight, citing concerns over VADA testing.

==== Donaire vs. Inoue II ====
After a successful first title defense in which he knocked out Reymart Gaballo, Donaire lost his WBC bantamweight title by knockout in the second round of a unification bout with WBA and IBF bantamweight champion Naoya Inoue in a rematch on June 7, 2022. The bout was held at the Super Arena in Saitama, Japan, and was broadcast on ESPN+. He was knocked out in the second round, after being knocked down twice. This was Donaire's first and only KO loss at bantamweight.

==== Donaire vs. Santiago ====
Soon after Naoya Inoue moved up in weight and vacated his bantamweight titles, it was announced that the WBC had approved Donaire vs. Alexandro Santiago for the vacant WBC bantamweight title. On July 13, 2023, it was announced that the bout would take place on the undercard of Errol Spence Jr. vs. Terence Crawford on July 29. This was Donaire's first fight since suffering a brutal KO loss to Inoue and was coming from 14 months of inactivity. In a very close fight Donaire lost the bout against Santiago via unanimous decision with the scorecard of 115–113, 116–112, 116–112.

== Personal life ==
On August 8, 2008, Donaire married Rachel Marcial, a Filipino-American USA national collegiate and military Taekwondo champion in a private ceremony at Carmel, California followed by a church service in the Philippines on November 11, 2011. They have two sons.

Donaire's wife is a member of his team and her father is his chief of security. On July 4, 2013, Donaire's pregnant wife was injured while saving a drowning child. She recovered and her then-unborn second child was unharmed.

Until 2023, Donaire only held United States citizenship, limiting his ability to legally stay in the Philippines. On August 14, 2023, Donaire reacquired his Filipino citizenship.

== Professional boxing record ==
53 fights	43 wins	10 losses
By knockout	28	3
By decision	15	7

No.	Result	Record	Opponent	Type	Round, time	Date	Age	Location	Notes
53	Loss	43–10	Riku Masuda	TKO	8 (10), 1:12	Mar 15, 2026	43 years, 119 days	Yokohama Buntai, Yokohama, Japan	
52	Loss	43–9	Seiya Tsutsumi	SD	12	Dec 17, 2025	43 years, 31 days	Kokugikan, Tokyo, Japan	For WBA bantamweight title
51	Win	43–8	Andrés Campos	TD	9 (12)	Jun 14, 2025	42 years, 210 days	Casino Buenos Aires, Buenos Aires, Argentina	Won vacant WBA interim bantamweight title; Unanimous TD: Donaire cut from an accidental head clash
50	Loss	42–8	Alexandro Santiago	UD	12	Jul 29, 2023	40 years, 255 days	T-Mobile Arena, Paradise, Nevada, U.S.	For vacant WBC bantamweight title
49	Loss	42–7	Naoya Inoue	TKO	2 (12), 1:24	Jun 7, 2022	39 years, 203 days	Super Arena, Saitama, Japan	Lost WBC bantamweight title; For WBA (Super), IBF, and The Ring bantamweight titles
48	Win	42–6	Reymart Gaballo	KO	4 (12), 2:59	Dec 11, 2021	39 years, 25 days	Dignity Health Sports Park, Carson, California, U.S.	Retained WBC bantamweight title
47	Win	41–6	Nordine Oubaali	KO	4 (12), 1:52	May 29, 2021	38 years, 194 days	Dignity Health Sports Park, Carson, California, U.S.	Won WBC bantamweight title
46	Loss	40–6	Naoya Inoue	UD	12	Nov 7, 2019	36 years, 356 days	Super Arena, Saitama, Japan	Lost WBA (Super) bantamweight title; For IBF and The Ring bantamweight titles; World Boxing Super Series: bantamweight final
45	Win	40–5	Stephon Young	KO	6 (12), 2:37	Apr 27, 2019	36 years, 162 days	Cajundome, Lafayette, Louisiana, U.S.	Retained WBA (Super) bantamweight title; World Boxing Super Series: bantamweight semi-final
44	Win	39–5	Ryan Burnett	RTD	4 (12), 3:00	Nov 3, 2018	35 years, 352 days	The SSE Hydro, Glasgow, Scotland	Won WBA (Super) bantamweight title; World Boxing Super Series: bantamweight quarter-final
43	Loss	38–5	Carl Frampton	UD	12	Apr 21, 2018	35 years, 156 days	SSE Arena, Belfast, Northern Ireland	For vacant WBO interim featherweight title
42	Win	38–4	Ruben Garcia Hernandez	UD	10	Sep 23, 2017	34 years, 311 days	Alamodome, San Antonio, Texas, U.S.	Won vacant WBC Silver featherweight title
41	Loss	37–4	Jessie Magdaleno	UD	12	Nov 5, 2016	33 years, 355 days	Thomas & Mack Center, Paradise, Nevada, U.S.	Lost WBO super bantamweight title
40	Win	37–3	Zsolt Bedák	TKO	3 (12), 2:44	Apr 23, 2016	33 years, 159 days	Sports Complex, Cebu City, Philippines	Retained WBO super bantamweight title
39	Win	36–3	Cesar Juarez	UD	12	Dec 11, 2015	33 years, 25 days	Roberto Clemente Coliseum, San Juan, Puerto Rico	Won vacant WBO super bantamweight title
38	Win	35–3	Anthony Settoul	TKO	2 (10), 1:41	Jul 18, 2015	32 years, 244 days	Cotai Arena, Macau, SAR	
37	Win	34–3	William Prado	TKO	2 (12), 2:16	Mar 28, 2015	32 years, 132 days	Smart Araneta Coliseum, Quezon City, Philippines	Won vacant NABF super bantamweight title
36	Loss	33–3	Nicholas Walters	TKO	6 (12), 2:59	Oct 18, 2014	31 years, 336 days	StubHub Center, Carson, California, U.S.	Lost WBA (Undisputed) featherweight title
35	Win	33–2	Simpiwe Vetyeka	TD	5 (12), 0:01	May 31, 2014	31 years, 196 days	Cotai Arena, Macau, SAR	Won WBA (Undisputed) featherweight title Unanimous TD: Donaire cut from an accidental head clash
34	Win	32–2	Vic Darchinyan	TKO	9 (10), 2:06	Nov 9, 2013	30 years, 358 days	American Bank Center, Corpus Christi, Texas, U.S.	
33	Loss	31–2	Guillermo Rigondeaux	UD	12	Apr 13, 2013	30 years, 148 days	Radio City Music Hall, New York City, New York, U.S.	Lost WBO and The Ring super bantamweight titles; For WBA (Super) super bantamweight title
32	Win	31–1	Jorge Arce	KO	3 (12), 2:59	Dec 15, 2012	30 years, 29 days	Toyota Center, Houston, Texas, U.S.	Retained WBO and The Ring super bantamweight titles
31	Win	30–1	Toshiaki Nishioka	TKO	9 (12), 1:54	Oct 13, 2012	29 years, 332 days	Home Depot Center, Carson, California, U.S.	Retained WBO super bantamweight title; Won vacant The Ring super bantamweight title
30	Win	29–1	Jeffrey Mathebula	UD	12	Jul 7, 2012	29 years, 234 days	Home Depot Center, Carson, California, U.S.	Retained WBO super bantamweight title; Won IBF super bantamweight title
29	Win	28–1	Wilfredo Vázquez Jr.	SD	12	Feb 4, 2012	29 years, 80 days	Alamodome, San Antonio, Texas, U.S.	Won vacant WBO super bantamweight title
28	Win	27–1	Omar Narváez	UD	12	Oct 22, 2011	28 years, 340 days	The Theater at Madison Square Garden, New York City, New York, U.S.	Retained WBC and WBO bantamweight titles
27	Win	26–1	Fernando Montiel	TKO	2 (12), 2:25	Feb 19, 2011	28 years, 95 days	Mandalay Bay Events Center, Paradise, Nevada, U.S.	Won WBC and WBO bantamweight titles
26	Win	25–1	Volodymyr Sydorenko	KO	4 (12), 1:48	Dec 4, 2010	28 years, 18 days	Honda Center, Anaheim, California, U.S.	Won vacant WBC Continental Americas bantamweight title
25	Win	24–1	Hernán Márquez	TKO	8 (12), 2:59	Jul 10, 2010	27 years, 236 days	José Miguel Agrelot Coliseum, San Juan, Puerto Rico	Retained WBA interim super flyweight title
24	Win	23–1	Manuel Vargas	KO	3 (12), 1:33	Feb 13, 2010	27 years, 89 days	Las Vegas Hilton, Winchester, Nevada, U.S.	Retained WBA interim super flyweight title
23	Win	22–1	Rafael Concepción	UD	12	Aug 15, 2009	26 years, 272 days	The Joint, Paradise, Nevada, U.S.	Won vacant WBA interim super flyweight title
22	Win	21–1	Raúl Martínez	TKO	4 (12), 2:42	Apr 19, 2009	26 years, 154 days	Araneta Coliseum, Quezon City, Philippines	Retained IBF and IBO flyweight titles
21	Win	20–1	Moruti Mthalane	TKO	6 (12), 1:31	Nov 1, 2008	25 years, 351 days	Mandalay Bay Events Center, Paradise, Nevada, U.S.	Retained IBF and IBO flyweight titles
20	Win	19–1	Luis Maldonado	TKO	8 (12), 1:16	Dec 1, 2007	25 years, 15 days	Foxwoods Resort Casino, Ledyard, Connecticut, U.S.	Retained IBF and IBO flyweight titles
19	Win	18–1	Vic Darchinyan	TKO	5 (12), 1:38	Jul 7, 2007	24 years, 233 days	The Arena at Harbor Yard, Bridgeport, Connecticut, U.S.	Won IBF and IBO flyweight titles
18	Win	17–1	Kevin Hudgins	TKO	1 (8), 2:29	May 12, 2007	24 years, 177 days	Events Center, Reno, Nevada, U.S.	
17	Win	16–1	Oscar Andrade	UD	12	Oct 7, 2006	23 years, 325 days	Mandalay Bay Events Center, Paradise, Nevada, U.S.	Retained NABF super flyweight title
16	Win	15–1	Jose Luis Cardenas	TKO	2 (8), 1:48	Jul 29, 2006	23 years, 255 days	Chumash Casino Resort, Santa Ynez, California, U.S.	
15	Win	14–1	Karen Harutyunyan	SD	10	Jan 20, 2006	23 years, 65 days	Pechanga Resort & Casino, Temecula, California, U.S.	Won NABF super flyweight title
14	Win	13–1	Ilido Julio	UD	8	Nov 5, 2005	22 years, 354 days	Caesars Tahoe, Stateline, Nevada, U.S.	
13	Win	12–1	Daniel Gonzalez	KO	1 (8), 2:19	Oct 1, 2005	22 years, 319 days	Events Center, Reno, Nevada, U.S.	
12	Win	11–1	Larry Olvera	UD	6	Jul 2, 2005	22 years, 228 days	Events Center, Reno, Nevada, U.S.	
11	Win	10–1	Paulino Villalobos	TKO	6 (8), 3:00	May 13, 2005	22 years, 178 days	Civic Auditorium, San Jose, California, U.S.	
10	Win	9–1	Gilberto Bolanos	UD	8	Nov 12, 2004	21 years, 362 days	Quiet Cannon, Montebello, California, U.S.	
9	Win	8–1	Ricardo Barrera	TKO	4 (6), 3:00	Jun 18, 2004	21 years, 215 days	Quiet Cannon, Montebello, California, U.S.	
8	Win	7–1	Jorge Lopez	TKO	1 (6), 1:43	Jun 27, 2003	20 years, 223 days	Mare Island Sports Center, Vallejo, California, U.S.	
7	Win	6–1	Mark Sales	UD	8	Nov 2, 2002	19 years, 351 days	Joe Cantada Boxing Arena, Taguig, Philippines	
6	Win	5–1	Kaichon Sor Vorapin	KO	2 (12)	Sep 1, 2002	19 years, 289 days	University of Guam, Mangilao, Guam	Won vacant WBO Asia Pacific flyweight title
5	Win	4–1	Noel Alma	TKO	2 (4)	May 31, 2002	19 years, 196 days	Elorde Sports Complex, Parañaque, Philippines	
4	Win	3–1	Jose Luis Torres	TKO	1 (4), 0:30	Jul 3, 2001	18 years, 229 days	Hyatt Regency Hotel, Monterey, California, U.S.	
3	Win	2–1	Saul Santoyo	UD	4	Jun 8, 2001	18 years, 204 days	Hollywood Park Racetrack, Inglewood, California, U.S.	
2	Loss	1–1	Rosendo Sanchez	UD	5	Mar 10, 2001	18 years, 114 days	Pacific Sports Center, Vallejo, California, U.S.	
1	Win	1–0	Jose Lazaro	KO	1 (4), 1:46	Feb 22, 2001	18 years, 98 days	Hollywood Park Racetrack, Inglewood, California, U.S.	

== Titles in boxing ==
=== Professional ===
Major world titles:

- IBF flyweight champion (112 lbs)
- WBC bantamweight champion (118 lbs) (2x)
- WBO bantamweight champion (118 lbs)
- WBA (Super) bantamweight champion (118 lbs)
- WBO super bantamweight champion (122 lbs) (2×)
- IBF super bantamweight champion (122 lbs)
- WBA (Undisputed) featherweight champion (126 lbs)

The Ring magazine titles:

- The Ring super bantamweight champion (122 lbs)

Interim world titles:

- WBA interim super flyweight champion (115 lbs)
- WBA interim bantamweight champion (118 lbs)

Minor world titles:

- IBO flyweight champion (112 lbs)

Regional titles:

- WBO Asia Pacific flyweight champion (112 lbs)
- NABF super flyweight champion (115 lbs)
- WBC Continental Americas bantamweight champion (118 lbs)
- NABF super bantamweight champion (122 lbs)
- WBC Silver featherweight champion (126 lbs)

Honorary titles:

- 2013 Flash Elorde Memorial champion
- WBC Diamond bantamweight champion
- WBC Diamond super bantamweight champion

=== Amateur ===
National titles:

- 1998 National Silver Gloves champion
- 1999 National Jr. Olympics champion
- 2000 National USA Tournament champion

International titles:

- 1999 International Jr. Olympics champion

== Recognitions ==
- 2007, 2011 and 2012 Philippine Sportswriters Association (PSA) Sportsman of the Year
- 2007 The Ring Knockout of the Year (in Round 5 against Vic Darchinyan)
- 2007 The Ring Upset of the Year (KO 5 against Vic Darchinyan)
- 2007 World Boxing Hall of Fame, Most Outstanding Boxer of the Year
- 2009, 2010 & 2011 Gabriel "Flash" Elorde Memorial Boxer of the Year
- 2009 Eastwood City Walk of Fame Awardee
- 2011 The Ring Knockout of the Year (in Round 2 against Fernando Montiel)
- 2011 Sports Illustrated Knockout of the Year (in Round 2 against Fernando Montiel)
- 2011 ESPN Knockout of the Year (in Round 2 against Fernando Montiel)
- 2012 Boxing Writers Association of America Fighter of the Year.
- 2012 ESPN Fighter of the Year.
- 2012 The Ring Fighter of the Year in RingTV.com's year-end awards fan poll.
- 2012 Sports Illustrated Fighter of the Year.
- 2012 Yahoo! Sports Fighter of the Year.
- 2012 BoxingScene Fighter of the Year
- 2019 The Ring magazine Fight of the Year
- 2021 Premier Boxing Champions Fighter of the Year

== In popular culture ==
Donaire has appeared on television as a guest and has appeared on Celebrity Duets in third-season episodes on GMA. Donaire is also featured in the video games Fight Night Round 4 and Fight Night Champion.

== Filmography ==
Year	Film	Role	Other notes
2016	MMK: "Boxing Ring"	Donaire played by (Sam Concepcion)	Episode dated April 16
2016	Flash Forward: Nonito Donaire Jr.	Himself	TV documentary – ABS-CBN Sport
2015	Fighter's Cut: Nonito Donaire Jr.	Himself	TV documentary / Interview
2014	Aquino & Abunda Tonight	Himself – Guest	Episode dated March 28
2014	The Bottomline with Boy Abunda	Himself – Guest	Episode dated April 5
2014	Kris TV	Himself – Guest	Episode dated April 7–8
2014	Donaire: Flash and Fire	Himself	TV documentary
2012	Palad Ta ang Nagbuot	Dodong Valderama	
2012	Sarah G. Live	Himself – Guest	Episode dated January 6
2012	Life in The Flash Lane	Himself	Online Documentary
2012	Gandang Gabi Vice	Himself – Guest	Episode dated August 5
2012	Bandila	Himself – Guest	Episode dated December 21
2011	Round 2... For Keeps	Himself	Wedding telecast
2009	Celebrity Duets: Philippine Edition	Himself – Contestant	
2009	Wish Ko Lang	Himself – Guest	
Video Games
Year	Video game	Role	Other notes
2011	Fight Night Champion	Himself	Playable fighter
2009	Fight Night Round 4	Himself	Playable fighter

== See also ==
- Notable boxing families
- List of Filipino boxing world champions
- List of world flyweight boxing champions
- List of world bantamweight boxing champions
- List of world super-bantamweight boxing champions
- List of world featherweight boxing champions
- List of boxing quadruple champions

Sporting positions
Amateur boxing titles
Previous: Brian Viloria	U.S. light flyweight champion 2000	Next: Ronald Siler
Regional boxing titles
New title	WBO Asia Pacific flyweight champion September 1, 2002 – November 2002; Vacated	Vacant Title next held by Glenn Donaire
Vacant Title last held by Gerson Guerrero	NABF super flyweight champion January 20, 2006 – July 2007; Vacated	Vacant Title next held by Everardo Morales
Vacant Title last held by Christian Esquivel	WBC Continental Americas bantamweight champion December 4, 2010 – February 19, 2011; Won world title	Vacant Title next held by Gerardo Marin Hernandez
Vacant Title last held by Vic Darchinyan	NABF super bantamweight champion March 28, 2015 – August 2015; Vacated	Vacant Title next held by Manuel Ávila
Vacant Title last held by Cristian Mijares	WBC Silver featherweight champion September 23, 2017 – November 3, 2018; Vacated	Vacant Title next held by Lerato Dlamini
Minor world boxing titles
Preceded by Vic Darchinyan	IBO flyweight champion July 7, 2007 – August 2009; Vacated	Vacant Title next held by César Seda
Major world boxing titles
Preceded by Vic Darchinyan	IBF flyweight champion July 7, 2007 – July 14, 2009; Vacated	Vacant Title next held by Moruti Mthalane
Vacant Title last held by Jorge Arce	WBA super flyweight champion Interim title August 15, 2009 – October 15, 2010; Vacated	Vacant Title next held by Drian Francisco
Preceded by Fernando Montiel	WBC bantamweight champion February 19, 2011 – October 22, 2011; Vacated	Vacant Title next held by Shinsuke Yamanaka
Preceded by Fernando Montiel	WBO bantamweight champion February 19, 2011 – October 22, 2011; Vacated	Vacant Title next held by Jorge Arce
Vacant Title last held by Jorge Arce	WBO super bantamweight champion February 4, 2012 – April 13, 2013	Succeeded by Guillermo Rigondeaux
Vacant Title last held by Israel Vázquez	The Ring super bantamweight champion October 13, 2012 – April 13, 2013	Succeeded by Guillermo Rigondeaux
Preceded by Jeffrey Mathebula	IBF super bantamweight champion July 7, 2012 – October 13, 2012; Vacated	Vacant Title next held by Jonatan Romero
Preceded by Simpiwe Vetyeka	WBA featherweight champion Undisputed title May 31, 2014 – October 18, 2014; Vacant after loss to Walters	Title discontinued
Vacant Title last held by Guillermo Rigondeaux	WBO super bantamweight champion December 11, 2015 – November 5, 2016	Succeeded by Jessie Magdaleno
Preceded by Ryan Burnett	WBA bantamweight champion Super title November 3, 2018 – November 7, 2019	Succeeded by Naoya Inoue
Preceded by Nordine Oubaali	WBC bantamweight champion May 29, 2021 – June 7, 2022	Succeeded by Naoya Inoue
Awards
Previous: Carlos Baldomir; UD12 Zab Judah	The Ring Upset of the Year; KO5 Vic Darchinyan; 2007	Next: Bernard Hopkins; UD12 Kelly Pavlik
Previous: Calvin Brock; KO6 Zuri Lawrence	The Ring Knockout of the Year; KO5 Vic Darchinyan; 2007	Next: Edison Miranda; KO3 David Banks
Previous: Sergio Martínez; KO2 Paul Williams	The Ring Knockout of the Year; KO2 Fernando Montiel; 2011	Next: Juan Manuel Márquez; KO6 Manny Pacquiao
Previous: Sergio Martínez; KO2 Paul Williams	ESPN Knockout of the Year; 2011	Next: Juan Manuel Márquez; KO6 Manny Pacquiao
Previous: Andre Ward	BWAA Fighter of the Year; 2012	Next: Floyd Mayweather Jr.
Previous: Canelo Álvarez vs. Gennady Golovkin II	The Ring Fight of the Year vs. Naoya Inoue; 2019	Next: Jose Zepeda vs. Ivan Baranchyk
Previous: Jarrett Hurd vs. Erislandy Lara	BWAA Fight of the Year vs. Naoya Inoue; 2019	Next: Jose Zepeda vs. Ivan Baranchyk
