= List of Guggenheim Fellowships awarded in 1998 =

List of Guggenheim Fellowships awarded in 1998

Fellow	Category	Field of Study
Don L. Anderson	Natural Sciences	Earth Science
José W. Araújo	Creative Arts	Film
Arthur P. Arnold	Natural Sciences	Neuroscience
Adam Baer	Creative Arts	Photography
Margarita Bali	Creative Arts	Choreography
Teodolinda Barolini	Humanities	Italian Literature
Burt Barr	Creative Arts	Fine Arts
Mitchell C. Begelman		Astronomy—Astrophysics
Bei Dao	Creative Arts	Poetry
Eugene W. Beier		Physics
Nicola Beisel		Sociology
Rafael D. Benguria		Mathematics
Robert G. Bergman		Chemistry
Lenard R. Berlanstein		French History
Cindy Bernard		Fine Arts
Bruce C. Berndt		History of Science & Technology
Pallab K. Bhattacharya		Engineering
William Hayes Biggs		Music Composition
Barbara Bloom		Fine Arts
Andrew Borowiec	Creative Arts	Photography
Svetlana Boym		Slavic Literature
Richard D. Brown		U.S. History
Tania Bruguera		Fine Arts
Ellen Bruno	Creative Arts	Film
Barbara K. Burgess		Molecular & Cellular Biology
Scott G. Burnham		Music Research
Judith Butler		Literary Criticism
Jin-Yi Cai		Computer Science
Antonio Caro		Fine Arts
Anne Carson		Poetry
Clare Cavanagh		Slavic Literature
Sun-Yung Alice Chang		Mathematics
Albert Chong	Creative Arts	Photography
Demetrios Christodoulou		Applied Mathematics
Horacio Crespo		Iberian & Latin American History
David Crumb		Music Composition
John D'Emilio		U.S. History
Richard Dellamora		English Literature
Justin N. Dello Joio		Music Composition
Yemane I. Demissie	Creative Arts	Film
Suzanne Desan		French History
Jared Diamond		Science Writing
Tom Donaghy		Drama & Performance Art
Rackstraw Downes		Fine Arts
Kathy Eden		Intellectual & Cultural History
Daniel Eisenberg	Creative Arts	Film
A. Roger Ekirch	Humanities	British History
Peter T. Ellison	Social Sciences	Anthropology & Cultural Studies
Jody Enders	Humanities	Medieval Literature
Steven A. Epstein	Humanities	Italian History
Ticio Escobar	Humanities	Fine Arts Research
Candace Falk	Humanities	U.S. History
James R. Farr	Humanities	French History
Gilles R. Fauconnier	Social Sciences	Psychology
Paula Findlen	Humanities	Renaissance History
Maurice A. Finocchiaro	Humanities	History of Science & Technology
David Fludd	Creative Arts	Fine Arts
Nina Y. Fonoroff	Creative Arts	Film
Hal Foster	Humanities	Fine Arts Research
Eduardo Fradkin	Natural Sciences	Physics
Kenji Fujita	Creative Arts	Fine Arts
Salvo Galano	Creative Arts	Photography
Julio Pedro Garcia-Espinosa Romero	Creative Arts	Film
David Gates		Fiction
Marvin Gates		Fine Arts
William M. Gelbart		Chemistry
Ana Gerzenstein		Anthropology & Cultural Studies
Timothy J. Gilfoyle		U.S. History
Margo Glantz		Fiction
Francisco Goldman		Fiction
Billy Golfus	Creative Arts	Film
Nury González		Fine Arts
Ain Gordon		Drama & Performance Art
Alma Gottlieb		Anthropology & Cultural Studies
J. Raul Grigera		Physics
Larry Gross		Film, Video, & Radio Studies
George Gruner		Physics
Mauro F. Guillén		Sociology
Tom Gunning		Film, Video, & Radio Studies
Sue Halpern		General Nonfiction
Abdellah Hammoudi		Near Eastern Studies
Lee Haring	Humanities	Folklore & Popular Culture
Julie Hecht		Fiction
Michael W. Herren		Medieval Literature
Carla Hesse		French History
Jody Hey		Organismic Biology & Ecology
Susan Hiller		Fine Arts
A. M. Homes		Fiction
Marie Howe		Poetry
Raymond B. Huey		Organismic Biology & Ecology
Ann Hutchinson Guest		Dance Studies
John Jasperse	Creative Arts	Choreography
Bill Jensen		Fine Arts
Michael Joo		Fine Arts
Eileen Julien		African Studies
Frances Myrna Kamm		Philosophy
Paul Kane		American Literature
Dennis Kardon		Fine Arts
John F. Kasson		U.S. History
Demetrius A. Klein	Creative Arts	Choreography
Timothy Kramer		Music Composition
Christopher Kyle	Creative Arts	Drama & Performance Art
Robert K. Lazarsfeld	Natural Sciences	Mathematics
William Leavitt		Fine Arts
Lyle Leverich		American Literature
Mariano J. Levin		Molecular & Cellular Biology
Nelson Lichtenstein		U.S. History
Mary Lindemann		German & East European History
Estela Susana Lizano Soberón		Physics
Nancy Lorenz		Fine Arts
Robert C. Maggio		Music Composition
Juan Maidagan		Fine Arts
Dusan Makavejev	Creative Arts	Film
Dionisio D. Martinez		Poetry
Elizabeth Anne McCauley		Photography Studies
Elizabeth McCracken		Fiction
Campbell McGrath		Poetry
Christopher F. McKee		Astronomy/Astrophysics
Tununa Mercado		Fiction
Sabeeha Merchant		Molecular & Cellular Biology
Lorenzo Meyer		Political Science
Mattison Mines		South Asian Studies
Marilyn Minter		Fine Arts
Peter Mombaerts		Neuroscience
Russell K. Monson		Plant Sciences
Judith Moore		General Nonfiction
Susan J. Napier	Humanities	East Asian Studies
Piotr Nawrot	Humanities	Music Research
Joachim Neugroschel		German & Scandinavian Literature
Jane O. Newman		German & Scandinavian Literature
Roger Newton	Creative Arts	Photography
Tom Noonan	Creative Arts	Film
Thomas V. O'Halloran	Natural Sciences	Molecular & Cellular Biology
Donald B. Oliver	Natural Sciences	Molecular & Cellular Biology
Luis A. Orozco	Natural Sciences	Physics
Marta María Pérez Bravo		Fine Arts
Janet Peery		Fiction
Laura Ann Petitto		Neuroscience
Paul Pierson		Political Science
Sergio Pitol		Fiction
Sarah B. Pomeroy		Classics
Gopal Prasad		Mathematics
Gonzalo de Prat Gay		Molecular & Cellular Biology
Alan S. Prince		Linguistics
Jorge Pullin		Physics
Fernando Quevedo	Natural Sciences	Physics
Eloise Quiñones Keber	Humanities	Fine Arts Research
Fidel Ramón		Neuroscience
Christopher A. Reed		Chemistry
Paula Richman		Religion
David Riggs		English Literature
Miguel Angel Rios		Fine Arts
Arturo Ripstein	Creative Arts	Film
Kenneth Rogoff		Economics
Christina D. Romer		Economics
James Romm		Classics
Jay Rosenblatt	Creative Arts	Film
Frank Salomon		Iberian & Latin American History
Guadalupe Santa Cruz		Fiction
Roberto A. Sánchez-Delgado		Chemistry
Carlos Sánchez-Gutierrez		Music Composition
Daniel L. Schacter		Psychology
Emanuel A. Schegloff		Sociology
Bambi B. Schieffelin		Anthropology & Cultural Studies
John G. Sclater		Earth Science
Neil H. Shubin		Molecular & Cellular Biology
Berta M. Sichel		Film, Video, & Radio Studies
Joseph H. Silverman		Mathematics
Jeffrey Chipps Smith		Fine Arts Research
Robert Smythe		Drama & Performance Art
Robin Chapman Stacey		Medieval History
Bruno Stagno		Architecture, Planning, & Design
Henry Staten		English Literature
Ilan Stavans		General Nonfiction
Sidney Strickland		Molecular & Cellular Biology
Susan Strome		Molecular & Cellular Biology
Wendy Sussman	Creative Arts	Fine Arts
Michael T. Taussig	Social Sciences	Anthropology & Cultural Studies
Bob Thall	Creative Arts	Photography
Salvatore Torquato	Natural Sciences	Engineering
Nancy J. Troy	Humanities	Fine Arts Research
Shripad Tuljapurkar	Natural Sciences	Statistics
Donna N. Uchizono	Creative Arts	Choreography
Gisela von Wobeser	Humanities	Iberian & Latin American History
Patricia Waddy	Humanities	Architecture, Planning, & Design
Elisabeth Weber	Humanities	French Literature
Martin Weber	Creative Arts	Photography
Barbara Weinstein	Humanities	Iberian & Latin American History
Richard H. Weisberg	Social Sciences	Law
Kate Wheeler	Creative Arts	Fiction
Lawrence L. Widdoes	Creative Arts	Music Composition
Isabel Wilkerson	Creative Arts	General Nonfiction
Linda Williams	Humanities	Film, Video, & Radio Studies
David Wilson	Creative Arts	Fine Arts
Jay Winter	Humanities	Intellectual & Cultural History
Robin Winters	Creative Arts	Fine Arts
Elise Kimerling Wirtschafter	Humanities	Russian History
Susan Wood	Creative Arts	Poetry
Michael Woodford	Social Sciences	Economics
Baron Wormser	Creative Arts	Poetry
Richard A. Wright	Social Sciences	Geography & Environmental Studies
Dolores Zinny	Creative Arts	Fine Arts
