= Nawrot =

Nawrot is a surname. Notable people with the surname include:

- Czesław Nawrot (1942–2019), Polish rower
- Józef Nawrot (1906–1982), Polish footballer
- Piotr Nawrot (born 1955), Polish Roman Catholic priest and musicologist

== See also ==
- Návrat, a Czech-language cognate
