= Angelo Peña (boxer) =

Dominican-Swiss boxer (born 1994)

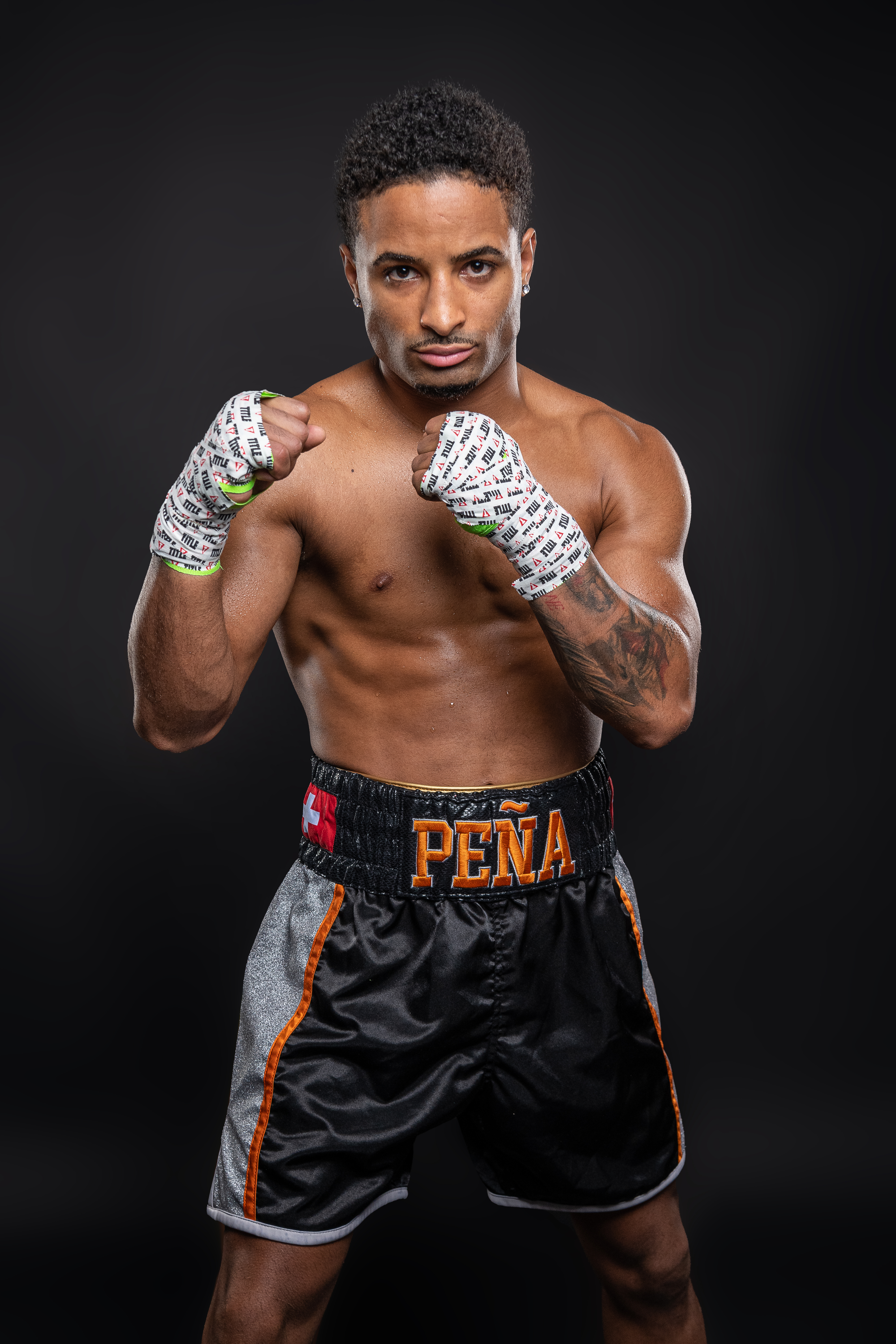
- Peña in 2023

Personal information
- Nickname: The One
- Born: Angelo Rafael Peña; September 30, 1994 (age 31) Madrid, Community of Madrid, Spain
- Height: 1.71 m (5 ft 7 in)
- Weight: Super featherweight; Lightweight

Boxing career
- Stance: Southpaw

Boxing record
- Total fights: 13
- Wins: 13
- Win by KO: 7
- Losses: 0

Angelo Rafael Peña (born 30 September 1994) is a Dominican-Swiss professional boxer who has held the WBO Inter-Continental super featherweight title since 2024.

== Amateur career ==
On 16 September 2017, Peña won his first amateur bout in St. Gallen, Switzerland. Between 2017 and 2021, Peña completed a total of 41 bouts, suffering seven defeats on the way through. On 23 February 2021, Peña lost to Moldovan Dorin Bucsa in the preliminary round of the "2021 Strandja Memorial" in Sofia, Bulgaria. On 21 November 2021, Peña defeated Ali Mohsseni to become the Swiss Featherweight amateur champion.

== Professional career ==
=== Early career ===
In autumn of 2021, Peña signed a contract with the Swiss boxing promotion Swiss Pro Boxing and has since been managed by Leander Strupler. He made his professional debut on 26 December 2021 at Bern, where he defeated Georgian boxer Irakli Shariashvili by knockout in round two. He then went on to fight several more professional bouts, including a first-round RTD victory on 4 June 2022 in Germany against former Italian champion Nicola Cipolletta.

=== Rise up the ranks ===
==== Peña vs. Takoucht ====
On 26 December 2023, Peña fought former EBU featherweight champion and IBF world featherweight title challenger Sofiane Takoucht for the IBO Continental super featherweight title in Bern. Peña overcame the veteran and won via fifth-round KO.

=== WBO Inter-Continental super featherweight champion ===
==== Peña vs. Hanabusa ====
Peña was scheduled on 14 September 2024 against 13–2–5 Japanese Hiroki Hanabusa for the vacant WBO Inter-Continental super featherweight title in Bern. Prior to the bout, Peña changed his coaching team; he is now to be trained by Cuban legend Ismael Salas, where they also were getting ready for potential bouts at Las Vegas in the future. Peña won via ten-rounds unanimous decision with the dominant scores of 100–90, 99–91 and 98–92, placing him in the WBO super featherweight rankings.

On 26 December 2024, Peña made the first defense of his title against South Korean (currently hailing from Canada) Gisu Lee, where he performed another dominant lop-sided unanimous decision victory.

==== Peña vs. Guerfi ====
On 18 April 2025, Peña defended his title against multiple-time EBU champion, former IBO world bantamweight and WBA interim flyweight titles challenger Karim Guerfi at the Bern Theatre. The bout had a lot of background/out-of-ring commotions, the bout was originally scheduled all the way back in 2023, however, Guerfi preferred another offer, in addition, Guerfi dropped due to an injury. On Instagram, Guerfi opted for a verbal offense as he taunted Peña through the comments, notably, he once commented "Easy work", "It's time to fight" under Peña's training pictures, another one is when Guerfi sent a picture of Petit suisse fruit quark alongside the statement "J'aime bien les petits Suisses." ("I like the little Swiss") Although Peña did not get involved with the one-sided verbal altercation, he admitted that it had gotten personal. On the bout, Peña retained his title and remains undefeated with an unchallenged fourth-round RTD victory.

==== Peña vs. Santisima ====
On 27 November 2025, it was announced that Peña was scheduled to defend his title against WBO world super bantamweight title challenger and previous ABCO Continental super featherweight champion Jeo Santisima on 26 December 2025 at the Kursaal Arena. Peña won via comfortable unanimous decision.

== Professional boxing record ==
13 fights	13 wins	0 losses
By knockout	7	0
By decision	6	0

No.	Result	Record	Opponent	Type	Round, time	Date	Location	Notes
13	Win	13–0	Jeo Santisima	UD	10	26 Dec 2025	Kursaal Arena, Bern, Switzerland	Retained WBO Inter-Continental super featherweight title
12	Win	12–0	Karim Guerfi	RTD	4 (10), 3:00	18 Apr 2025	Stadttheater Bern, Bern, Switzerland	Retained WBO Inter-Continental super featherweight title
11	Win	11–0	Gisu Lee	UD	10	26 Dec 2024	Kursaal Arena, Bern, Switzerland	Retained WBO Inter-Continental super featherweight title
10	Win	10–0	Hiroki Hanabusa	UD	10	14 Sep 2024	Mobiliar Arena, Muri bei Bern, Switzerland	Won vacant WBO Inter-Continental super featherweight title
9	Win	9–0	Eduardo Costa do Nascimento	UD	10	29 Mar 2023	Stadttheater Bern, Bern, Switzerland	
8	Win	8–0	Sofiane Takoucht	KO	5 (10), 0:35	26 Dec 2023	Kursaal, Bern, Switzerland	Won vacant IBO Continental super featherweight title
7	Win	7–0	Baina Mazola	KO	2 (8), 1:35	10 Jun 2023	Parktheater, Grenchen, Switzerland	
6	Win	6–0	Said Chino	UD	8	26 Dec 2022	Kursaal, Bern, Switzerland	
5	Win	5–0	Joshua Ocampo	UD	6	29 Oct 2022	Salle des Fetes St-Leonard, Fribourg, Switzerland	
4	Win	4–0	Bukhuti Tatishvili	TKO	2 (6), 2:00	24 Sep 2022	Klingentalturnhalle, Basel, Switzerland	
3	Win	3–0	Nicola Cipolletta	RTD	1 (6), 3:00	4 Jun 2022	Argensporthalle, Wangen im Allgäu, Germany	
2	Win	2–0	Igor Lazarev	RTD	2 (6), 3:00	15 Apr 2022	Stadttheater Bern, Bern, Switzerland	
1	Win	1–0	Irakli Shariashvili	KO	2 (6), 1:35	26 Dec 2021	Kursaal Arena, Bern, Switzerland	

== Personal life ==
Angelo Rafael Peña was born in Madrid, Spain to Dominican parents, he later moved to the Dominican Republic with his parents. He discovered his passion for boxing due to many of his relatives being boxers themselves. At the age of eight, he moved to Ostermundigen, Switzerland, where he would grow up, as a teenager, he was active in sports such as kickboxing and football. By 2017, he focused solely on boxing, later joining the BoxingKings Club in Bern, where he was trained by professional boxer Alain Chervet. Peña completed a vocational apprenticeship in retail and works part-time as a barista.
