= Návrat =

Návrat (Czech feminine: Návratová), sometimes spelled Nawrat or Nawrath, is a surname derived from the Czech noun návrat. Notable people with this surname include:

- Matthias Nawrat (born 1979), German writer
- Philipp Nawrath (born 1993), German biathlete
- Zdeněk Návrat (born 1931), Czech ice hockey player

== See also ==
- Nawrot, a Polish-language cognate
