= Jonas Sultan =

Filipino boxer (born 1991)

Personal information
- Nicknames: Zorro; Batman; One Punch
- Nationality: Filipino
- Born: Jonas Andaya Sultan; December 16, 1991 (age 34) Tampilisan, Zamboanga del Norte, Philippines
- Height: 5 ft 4 in (1.63 m)
- Weight: Bantamweight; Super Bantamweight

Boxing career
- Stance: Orthodox

Boxing record
- Total fights: 27
- Wins: 19
- Win by KO: 11
- Losses: 8

Jonas Sultan (born December 16, 1991) is a Filipino professional boxer, former IBF World title challenger. He is the current WBO Inter-continental bantamweight champion. He held the IBF Inter-continental junior bantamweight title since December 2016 by beating South Africa's Makazole Tete.

== Professional career ==
=== Early career at super flyweight and bantamweight ===
Sultan made his professional debut against Glenn Campaner on 17 March 2013. He won his fight by unanimous decision, with scores of 40–36, 39-37 and 40–36. He amassed a 9–2 record during the next two years, with four record coming by way of stoppage. Sultan was scheduled to challenge Rene Dacquel for the Philippines Games & Amusement Board (GAB) bantamweight title on 11 July 2015. He won the fight by unanimous decision, with scores of 115–111, 114-112 and 117–109. Dacquel was deducted a point in the ninth round for a clash of heads which caused a cut above Sultan's right eyelid. Sultan next faced the #11 ranked IBF super-flyweight contender Go Onaga on 15 November 2015, at the City Gym in Tomigusuku, Japan, in his first fight outside of Philippines. Onaga won the fight by unanimous decision, with scores of 99–92, 98-93 and 97–94. Sultan faced Tatsuya Ikemizu on 27 March 2016, in his second fight in Japan. He won the fight by a second-round technical knockout. Sultan made the first defense of his GAB bantamweight title against Romel Oliveros on 28 May 2016. He won the fight by a fifth-round knockout, stopping Oliveros with a right straight.

Sultan challenged the reigning IBF Intercontinental super-flyweight titleholder Makazole Tete on 16 December 2016. The fight took place in the champion's native East London, South Africa, at the Mdantsane Indoor Centre. Despite coming into the fight as an underdog, Sultan won his first regional title by an upset second-round technical knockout.

==== Sultan vs. Jaro ====
Sultan made the first defense of his secondary title against the former WBC and The Ring flyweight champion Sonny Boy Jaro on 7 May 2017. He won the fight by an eight-round knockout, stopping Jaro with a flurry of punches at the 1:25 minute mark.

==== Sultan vs. Casimero ====
Sultan faced the former IBF junior-flyweight and flyweight champion John Riel Casimero in an IBF super-flyweight title eliminator bout on 16 September 2017, at the Waterfront Hotel and Casino in Cebu City, Philippines. He won the fight by unanimous decision, with scores of 117–111, 116-112 and 115–113.

==== Sultan vs. Ancajas ====
Sultan's victory against Casimero earned him the right to challenge the reigning IBF super-flyweight champion Jerwin Ancajas. The bout between the two was scheduled for 26 May 2018, and took place at the Savemart Center in Fresno, California. Ancajas won the fight by unanimous decision, with scores of 119–109, 117-111 and 119–109.

Sultan faced the one-time WBO flyweight title challenger Ardin Diale on 24 November 2018. He won the fight by unanimous decision, with scores of 98–92, 97-93 and 98–92. After successfully bouncing back from his loss to Ancajas, Sultan was scheduled to face Athenkosi Dumezweni for the vacant WBC Silver super-flyweight title on 28 April 2019. He lost the fight by a wide unanimous decision, with scores of 117–109, 119-108 and 119–109. Sultan was knocked down twice during the twelve round bout. Sultan faced Salatiel Amit on 17 August 2019, in his final fight at super-flyweight. He won the fight by a seventh-round technical knockout.

=== Return to bantamweight ===
Sultan moved up to bantamweight for his next bout, against Jose Maria Cardenas, on the undercard of the WBO bantamweight title bout between John Riel Casimero and Guillermo Rigondeaux. The bout was scheduled for 14 August 2021, following a two-year absence from the sport, and took place at the Dignity Health Sports Park in Carson, California. Cardenas later withdrew from the bout, and was replaced by Sharone Carter. Sultan won the fight by knockout, stopping Carter with a right straight at the 2:29 minute mark of the seventh round.

Sultan faced the undefeated Carlos Caraballo for the vacant WBO Intercontinental bantamweight title on 30 October 2021, at the Madison Square Garden in New York City. He won the action-packed bout by unanimous decision, with all three judges scoring the fight 94–93 in his favor. Sultan knocked Caraballo down four times, in the second, third, sixth and ninth rounds, and was himself knocked down once, in the third round.

==== Sultan vs. Butler ====
Sultan was scheduled to face Paul Butler for the vacant WBO interim bantamweight title on April 22, 2022. Sultan stepped in as a short notice replacement for the WBO bantamweight champion John Riel Casimero, who was not permitted to fight by the British Boxing Board of Control (BBBofC) due to medical guidelines violation. Sultan lost the fight by unanimous decision, with scores of 116–112, 117–111 and 117–111.

== Professional boxing record ==
27 fights	19 wins	8 losses
By knockout	11	1
By decision	8	7
Draws	0	

No.	Result	Record	Opponent	Type	Round, time	Date	Location	Notes
27	Loss	19–8	Katsuma Akitsugi	UD	10	2025-07-12	Save Mart Arena, Fresno, U.S.	
26	Loss	19–7	Riku Masuda	KO	1 (8), 2:21	2024-02-24	Ryōgoku Kokugikan, Tokyo, Japan	
25	Win	19–6	Frank Gonzalez	UD	8	2023-09-06	Whitesands Events Center, Plant City, U.S.	
24	Loss	18–6	Paul Butler	UD	12	2022-04-22	M&S Bank Arena, Liverpool, England	For vacant WBO interim bantamweight title
23	Win	18–5	Carlos Caraballo	UD	10	2021-10-30	Madison Square Garden Theater, New York	Won vacant WBO Intercontinental bantamweight title
22	Win	17–5	Sharone Carter	KO	7 (8), 2:29	2021-08-14	Dignity Health Sports Park, Carson, California, U.S.	
21	Win	16–5	Salatiel Amit	TKO	7 (10), 1:59	2019-08-17	Superdome, Ormoc City, Leyte, Philippines	
20	Loss	15–5	Athenkosi Dumezweni	UD	12	2019-04-28	Orient Theatre, East London, South Africa	For vacant WBC Silver super-flyweight title
19	Win	15–4	Ardin Diale	UD	10	2018-11-24	IEC Convention Center, Barangay Mabolo, Cebu City, Philippines	
18	Loss	14–4	Jerwin Ancajas	UD	12	2018-05-26	Savemart Center, Fresno, U.S.	For IBF super-flyweight title
17	Win	14–3	John Riel Casimero	UD	12	2017-09-16	Waterfront Hotel and Casino, Cebu City, Philippines	
16	Win	13–3	Sonny Boy Jaro	KO	8 (12), 1:25	2017-05-07	Angono Sports Complex, Barangay Mahabang, Angono, Philippines	Retained IBF Intercontinental super-flyweight title
15	Win	12–3	Makazole Tete	TKO	2 (12)	2016-12-16	Mdantsane Indoor Centre, East London, South Africa	Won IBF Intercontinental super-flyweight title
14	Win	11–3	Romel Oliveros	KO	5 (12)	2016-05-28	University of St. La Salle Coliseum, Bacolod, Philippines	Retained GAB bantamweight title
13	Win	10–3	Tatsuya Ikemizu	TKO	2 (8), 2:37	2016-03-27	Towa Pharmaceutical Ractab Dome, Kadohama, Japan	
12	Loss	9–3	Go Onaga	UD	10	2015-11-15	City Gym, Tomigusuku, Japan	
11	Win	9–2	Rene Dacquel	UD	12	2015-07-11	Mandaluyong Gym, Mandaluyong Sports Center, Mandaluyong, Philippines	Won GAB bantamweight title
10	Win	8–2	Brian Lobetania	UD	10	2015-05-30	Dapitan City Cultural and Sports Center, Dapitan, Philippines	
9	Win	7–2	Jerson Mancio	KO	5 (10), 2:11	2015-02-21	Murcia Sports and Cultural Center, Murcia, Philippines	
8	Win	6–2	Andrew Palas	TKO	7 (8)	2014-11-25	Mahinog Gym, Mahinog, Philippines	
7	Win	5–2	Renante Suacasa	TKO	1 (8), 1:52	2014-08-23	Barangay Lapasan Covered Court, Cagayan de Oro, Philippines	
6	Loss	4–2	Jonathan Francisco	SD	6	2014-06-28	Mindanao Civic Center Gymnasium, Tubod, Philippines	
5	Win	4–1	Marlon Macayan	UD	6	2014-01-19	Gaisano Country Mall Parking Lot, Barangay Banilad, Cebu City, Philippines	
4	Win	3–1	Rocky Alvarez	TD	4 (6)	2013-11-23	City Hall Grounds, Cagayan de Oro, Philippines	
3	Loss	2–1	Rolando Servania	SD	6	2013-07-21	Bacolod Arts, Youth and Sports (BAYS) Center, Bacolod, Philippines	
2	Win	2–0	Kazuma Ejiri	TKO	1 (4), 1:16	2013-05-25	Cebu City Waterfront Hotel & Casino, Barangay Lahug, Cebu City, Philippines	
1	Win	1–0	Glenn Campaner	UD	4	2013-03-17	Davao City, Philippines	

== Titles in boxing ==
Regional Titles:

- GAB bantamweight title (118 lbs)
- IBF Intercontinental super flyweight title (115 lbs)
- WBO Intercontinental bantamweight title (118 lbs)

Sporting positions
Preceded by Makazole Tete	IBF super flyweight champion Inter-Continental title December 16, 2016 – May 28, 2018; Lost bid for world title	Vacant Title next held by Alexandru Marin
