= John P. Burgess =

American philosopher (born 1948)

- Born: John Patton Burgess; 5 June 1948 (age 78)

Education
- Education: Princeton University; Ohio State University; University of California, Berkeley (PhD, 1974)
- Thesis: Infinitary Languages and Descriptive Set Theory (1974)
- Doctoral advisor: Jack Silver

Philosophical work
- Era: Contemporary philosophy
- Region: Western philosophy
- School: Analytic philosophy
- Doctoral students: Penelope Maddy, Nicholas J.J. Smith
- Notable students: John Baez
- Main interests: Logic, philosophy of mathematics
- Notable ideas: Anti-nominalism in the philosophy of mathematics

John Patton Burgess (born 5 June 1948) is an American philosopher. He is John N. Woodhull Professor of Philosophy at Princeton University where he specializes in logic and philosophy of mathematics.

== Education and career ==
Burgess received his Ph.D. from the University of California, Berkeley's Group in Logic and Methodology of Science. His interests include logic, philosophy of mathematics and selected topics in metaethics and philosophy of mind. He is the author of numerous articles on logic, philosophy of mathematics, and the history of analytic philosophy. In 2012, he was elected a Fellow of the American Academy of Arts and Sciences. In 2026 he delivered the 37th Gödel Lecture. He is the brother of Barbara Burgess.

== Selected publications ==
- 1997. A Subject with No Object: Strategies for Nominalistic Reconstrual of Mathematics (with Gideon Rosen), Oxford University Press. ISBN 0198236158
- 2005. Fixing Frege, Princeton University Press. ISBN 0691122318
- 2007. Computability and Logic (with George Boolos and Richard C. Jeffrey), Cambridge University Press. ISBN 0521877520
- 2008. Mathematics, Models, and Modality: Selected Philosophical Essays, Cambridge University Press. ISBN 0521880343
- 2009. Philosophical Logic, Princeton University Press. ISBN 0691137897
- 2011. Truth (with Alexis Burgess), Princeton University Press. ISBN 9780691144016
- 2013. Saul Kripke: Puzzles and Mysteries ISBN 978-0-7456-5284-9.
- 2015. Rigor and Structure, Oxford University Press. ISBN 9780198722229
- 2022. Set Theory, Cambridge Elements, Cambridge University Press. ISBN 9781108986915
- 2024. A Logician's Perspective on the Relation Between the Mind and Body: Mentality and Modality, Cambridge Scholars Publishing. ISBN 1-0364-0189-8
