= Hayato Tsutsumi =

Japanese boxer (born 1999)

Hayato Tsutsumi 堤駿斗
Personal information
- Born: 12 July 1999 (age 27) Chiba, Chiba Prefecture, Japan
- Height: 5 ft 7 1/2 in (171 cm)
- Weight: Featherweight; Super featherweight

Boxing career
- Stance: Orthodox

Boxing record
- Total fights: 9
- Wins: 9
- Win by KO: 6
Medal record
Men's amateur boxing
Representing Japan
Youth World Championships
Gold medal – first place	2016 St. Petersburg	Flyweight

Hayato Tsutsumi (堤駿斗, Shunto Tsutsumi; born 12 July 1999) is a Japanese professional boxer. As an amateur, Tsutsumi won a gold medal at the 2016 World Youth Championships. Tsutsumi also competed at the 2021 World Championships.

== Amateur career ==
=== World Youth Championship result ===
Saint Petersburg 2016

- First round: Defeated Sophon Klachun (Thailand) 5–0
- Second Round: Defeated Hamsat Shadalov (Germany) 4–0
- Quarter-finals: Defeated Jack Bowen (Australia) 5–0
- Semi–finals: Defeated Otabek Kholmatov (Uzbekistan) 3–2
- Final: Defeated Elio Crespo Santos (Cuba) 5–0

=== Asian Games result ===
Jakarta-Palembang 2018

- Round of 32: Defeated by Kharkhuu Enkhamar (Mongolia) 3–2

=== World Championship result ===
Belgrade 2021

- First round: Defeated Lázaro Álvarez (Cuba) 5–0
- Second round: Defeated Theocharis Karzis (Greece) 5–0
- Third round: Defeated by Vsevolod Skumkov (ROC) 4–1

== Professional career ==
Tsutsumi made his professional debut on 13 July 2022, in a bout against Jhon Gemino. Tsutsumi was declared the winner via wide unanimous decision after controlling the duration of the bout. Tsutsumi's second outing as a professional was against Pete Apolinar on 31 December 2022. In the sixth round, Tsutsumi scored the first knockdown of his career after landing a combination of punches. Despite Apolinar recovering from the knockdown, Tsutsumi secured the win after outboxing his opponent for the majority of the bout.

On 31 May 2023, Tsutsumi faced former world title challenger Jeo Santisima for the vacant OPBF featherweight title. Tsutsumi was able to secure the win after outboxing his Filipino opponent. Tsutsumi returned to the ring on 31 December 2023, as he faced Luis Moncion Ventura. Tsutsumi started the bout aggressively and bloodied the nose of his opponent in the second round. During the third round, Tsutsumi landed a hard shot which sent his opponent to the canvas. Ventura was able to recover from the knockdown, but was floored for a second time less than a minute later which resulted in the referee calling an end to the bout in the third round.

His next bout was against former WBA bantamweight champion Anselmo Moreno on 17 May 2024. A day prior to the fight, Tsutsumi reportedly weighted in as much as 3.5lbs over the featherweight limit of 126lbs. In the bout itself, Tsustumi was able to drop his opponent with a left hand in the third round. Moreno recovered from the knockdown, but was put on the canvas for a second time later in the third round. Tsutsumi was declared the winner after Moreno was counted out following the second knockdown. On 19 April 2024, it was announced that the Japanese Boxing Commission had suspended Tsutsumi until 16 October 2024 for failing to make weight before the bout with Moreno.

Following the end of his suspension, Tsutsumi made his return to the ring in a bout against René Alvarado on 31 December 2024. In the opening rounds, Tsutsumi was able to impose himself on the fight by consistently landing clean shots to the head and body of his opponent. In the eighth round, Tsutsumi trapped Alvarado against the ropes and landed a flurry of unanswered punches to the head. Following this, the referee opted to call an end to the bout. On 11 May 2025, Tsutsumi faced Jaime Arboleda. In the opening two rounds, Tsutsumi was able to connect with a number of clean shots to the head and body of his Panamanian opponent. In the third round, Tsutsumi scored the first knockdown of the bout after landing a counter left hook to the head of Arboleda. After Arboleda recovered from the knockdown, Tsutsumi continued to pressure his opponent by connecting with a number of heavy punches. Following this, the referee decided to call an end to the bout midway through the third round.

On 16 August 2025, Tsutsumi defeated Qais Ashfaq by third round stoppage in Riyadh, Saudi Arabia, on the undercard of the Moses Itauma vs. Dillian Whyte fight.

Tsutsumi was scheduled to challenge British boxer Jazza Dickens (36–5, 15 KOs) for his WBA super-featherweight title on 27 December 2025, in Riyadh, Saudi Arabia as part of The Ring V: Night of the Samurai card. However, the fight was cancelled after Tsutsumi suffered an orbital floor fracture while in training camp.

== Professional boxing record ==
9 fights	9 wins	0 losses
By knockout	6	0
By decision	3	0

No.	Result	Record	Opponent	Type	Round, time	Date	Location	Notes
9	Win	9–0	Felix Batista San Juan	TKO	2 (10), 1:25	14 Jul 2026	Korakuen Hall, Tokyo, Japan	
8	Win	8–0	Qais Ashfaq	TKO	3 (10), 2:07	16 Aug 2025	anb Arena, Riyadh, Saudi Arabia	
7	Win	7–0	Jaime Arboleda	TKO	3 (10), 2:39	11 May 2025	Ota City General Gymnasium, Tokyo, Japan	
6	Win	6–0	René Alvarado	TKO	8 (10), 1:55	31 Dec 2024	Ota City General Gymnasium, Tokyo, Japan	
5	Win	5–0	Anselmo Moreno	KO	3 (10), 2:45	17 May 2024	Korakuen Hall, Tokyo, Japan	
4	Win	4–0	Luis Moncion Ventura	TKO	3 (10), 2:14	31 Dec 2023	Ota City General Gymnasium, Tokyo, Japan	
3	Win	3–0	Jeo Santisima	UD	12	31 May 2023	Korakuen Hall, Tokyo, Japan	Won vacant OPBF featherweight title
2	Win	2–0	Pete Apolinar	UD	8	31 Dec 2022	Ota City General Gymnasium, Tokyo, Japan	
1	Win	1–0	Jhon Gemino	UD	8	13 Jul 2022	Ota City General Gymnasium, Tokyo, Japan	

Sporting positions
Regional boxing titles
Vacant Title last held by Satoshi Shimizu	OPBF featherweight champion 31 May 2023 – September 2024; Vacated	Vacant Title next held by Mikito Nakano
