= Paul Kane (poet) =

American poet, critic and scholar (born 1950)

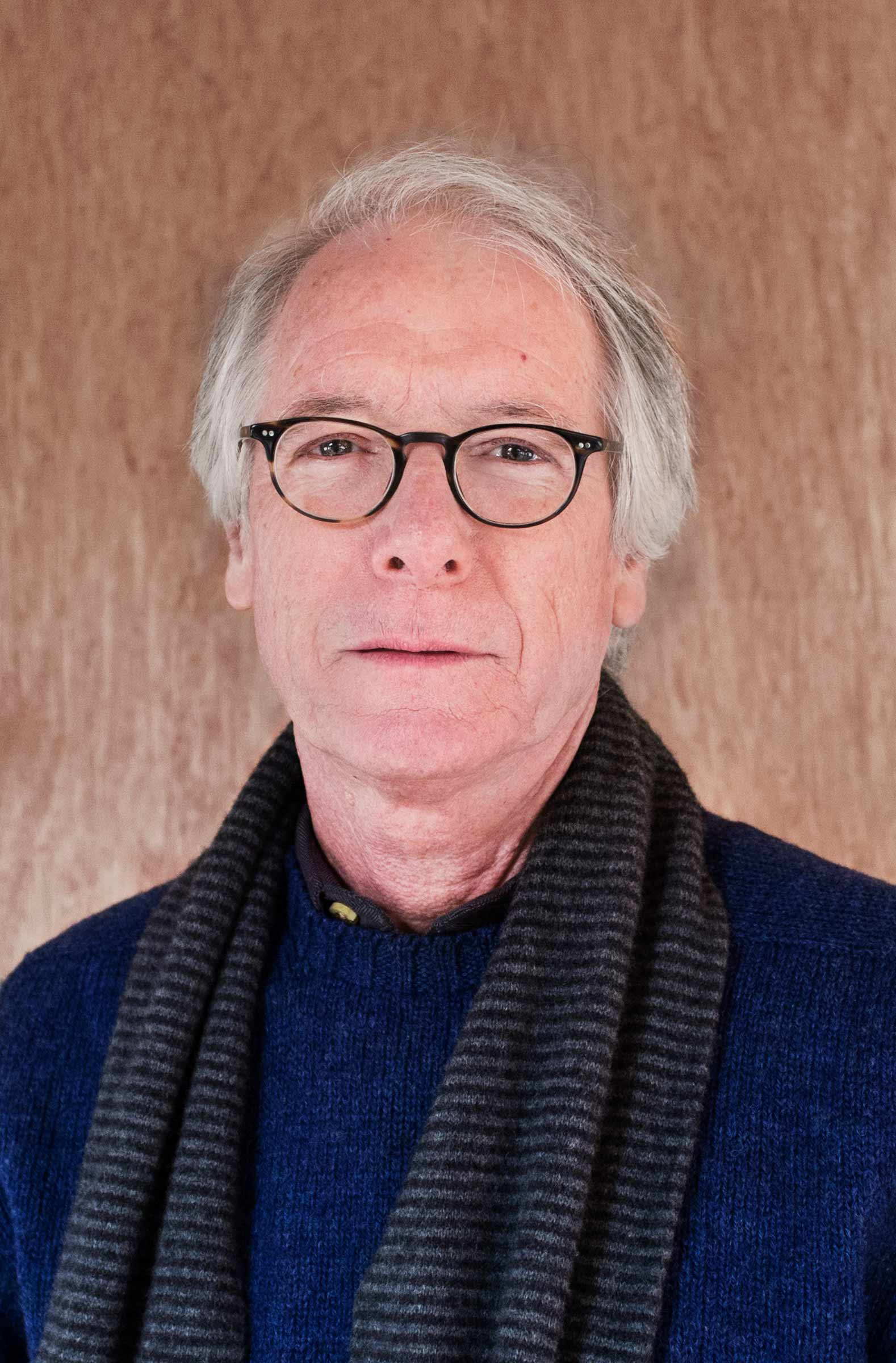
- Kane in 2021
- Born: March 23, 1950 (age 76); Cobleskill, New York, U.S.
- Education: Yale University
- Occupations: Writer; poet; critic; professor of English at Vassar College

Paul Kane (born March 23, 1950) is an American poet, critic and scholar. Awards for his work include Fellowships from the National Endowment for the Humanities, the Guggenheim Foundation, the Bogliasco Foundation, a Fulbright Award, an honorary doctorate from La Trobe University in Australia, and The Order of Australia. He is also considered an Australian poet. Kane is professor emeritus at Vassar College with homes in Clinton Corners and Warwick, New York.

== Life ==
Kane was born in a small village in upstate New York and has lived most of his life in the country. Residing in Warwick, NY, since 1974, and now Clinton Corners, NY, he also spends time each year in rural Australia, where he built himself a house as a retreat. He finished high school at The Hill School in Pottstown, PA, where he met visiting poet W. H. Auden, and afterwards spent a year at St. Peter's School in York, England, on an English-Speaking Union Fellowship. He subsequently attended Yale University, where he was active in the student movement. After college, he began studying at the Chardavogne Barn, under the tutelage of W. A. Nyland. He spent a decade working various jobs, including teaching, carpentry, landscaping, rug repair and bookselling. Kane received a Fulbright award to the University of Melbourne in 1984 to write a study of Australian poetry. He then spent a year as the Schweitzer Prize Preceptor in Poetics at New York University before returning to Yale in 1986, where he completed a doctorate. From 1990 to 2022, he worked as a professor at Vassar College. He also taught at Monash University in Melbourne, Australia (1993) and the University of Bologna, Italy (2022).

== Career ==
As an undergraduate at Yale (1969–73) Kane worked with poets Mark Strand, Richard Howard, and Jean Valentine and studied literature with Cleanth Brooks and Harold Bloom. He also met Robert Penn Warren, Elizabeth Bishop, Robert Lowell and Allen Ginsburg (who visited during the student strike in 1970). After college Kane began publishing poems in journals, including Poetry, The New American Review, The Paris Review, The New Republic, The Kenyon Review and Grand Street. After the Fulbright year in Australia, where he befriended poets Vincent Buckley, Chris Wallace-Crabbe, Gwen Harwood, Kevin Hart, Philip Hodgins and Les Murray, he worked with John Hollander, Harold Bloom and Geoffrey Hartman at the Yale Graduate School. He taught briefly at Yale before going on to Vassar College. During that time, his first book of poems was published by George Braziller in New York, The Farther Shore (1989), which Nobel Laureate Joseph Brodsky described as "a dark echo of Robert Frost."

Commute

Always in those trips by car
there was a sense of wishing for what
was not yet: morning's appointments,
a quick lunch, conversations
in the afternoon, the ride back.
And when the sun rose and the speeding
air glittered, the talk again turned
to older travels, other travails.
And always it seemed we had passed that point
before, and the landscapes converged
to a simple prospect, a single wish:
that everything recurring for us might end,
the coming and going over the same ground,
that we might split the cost of turning
forward to begin again—payment
in exchange for all we may have changed.

— from The Farther Shore

In 1994, Kane co-edited the Library of America edition of Ralph Waldo Emerson: Collected Poems and Translations, and brought out the following year, Poetry of the American Renaissance: A Diverse Anthology from the Romantic Period (1995, rev. 2012). This was followed by his ground-breaking Australian Poetry: Romanticism and Negativity (1996), hailed as "magnificent" and praised for its "theoretical reach and elegance."

Kane's second book of poems, Drowned Lands (2000), continued the personal and historical themes explored in his earlier collection. Harold Bloom praised Kane for adding to "the Virgilian elegance of The Farther Shore a quality of quizzical wisdom." Kane's next major collection, Work Life (2007), extended his range (John Koethe thought it "imbued with the magic of the matter-of-fact") and touched on the collective trauma of 9/11, as in the poem "The Knowing".

The Knowing

There came a day when to hear an airplane,
whether hard-edged drone or high whine,
gave one pause. We never were innocent,
only incurious within our managed lives,
worshipping household gods, lending unawares
our good name to a curse in others' mouths.
What has befallen us befell the world
a long time ago--long before we forgot
the club, the knife, the whip were ours too,
that the land absorbed blood as readily as rain.
Look at the garden and the order of these flowers:
circle within circle, like a dance or
a beautiful song that catches the breath.
It is mid-afternoon in late summer,
the sky's high dome of blue almost infinite.
Layers of sound separate out, each
a different register: the wind in the trees,
the cicadas in the grass, the birds calling
and twittering, and the wind chime ringing
pure notes, improvising a melody.
The eyes behold and are held by color--
the red barn, blue door, all the shades of green
and the riot of the garden. Even
the long shadows are clarifying.
Set this world on fire, you will know its worth.

— from Work Life

In 2011, a collection of his poems was translated into Chinese as The Scholar's Rock, and, in 2013, Kane collaborated with the Irish sound artist Katie O'Looney to make Seven Catastrophes in Four Movements (Farpoint Recordings). He also published a selection of translations from the Persian poet Hafiz, with illustrations by his wife, Tina Kane, as a chapbook, Hafiz: Twelve Ghazals (Warwick Publications, 2014).

Welcome Light: Poems by Paul Kane, called “a wholly welcome addition to the oeurve of Paul Kane” by the poet Mary Jo Salter, was published by Audubon Terrace Press in 2016. A second collection of poems in Chinese translation appeared in 2017 from Beijing.

In 2017, Kane collaborated with the Australian poet John Kinsella on a co-authored book, Renga: 100 Poems, published in Australia by GloriaSMH Press. It was described by reviewer David McCooey as “a powerful work of eco-poetics.”

After the death of his wife, Tina, in 2015 from complications of ALS, Kane wrote a series of poems, A Passing Bell: Ghazals for Tina, which was published in Australia in 2018 by White Crane Press and by George Braziller in New York in 2019. It was selected as one of the best books of 2018 by novelist Alex Miller in The Age newspaper.

In 2022, Kane brought out a collection of “verse essays” entitled Earth, Air, Water, Fire (Warwick Publications), which became the basis for an art show at the Bendigo Art Gallery (Australia) in 2023–2024, in collaboration with John Wolseley and Brodie Ellis. An audio version, with soundscapes by composer/musician Katie O’Looney, was released as a 2-CD set in 2023.

As a scholar of American literature, Kane writes primarily on the work of the Transcendentalists, particularly Ralph Waldo Emerson, but he also focuses on contemporary poetry and criticism. His interest in environmental literature can be seen in his Rothko Chapel talk, published as "Inner Landscapes as Sacred Landscapes" in The Kenyon Review (2003).

Kane's involvement with Australian literature has grown steadily over the years. A founding member of the American Association of Australasian Literary Studies in 1986, and President from 1991 to 1996, he was Poetry Editor of its journal Antipodes from 1987 to 2022. In 1995 he attended the inaugural Mildura Writers Festival in Australia and subsequently became artistic director. In 2012, as General Editor, he initiated The Braziller Series of Australian Poets to introduce contemporary Australian poets to American readers. Nobel laureate J. M. Coetzee, writing in The New York Review of Books, called Kane's Australian Poetry "the best study we have of poetry in Australia." In 2013, Kane received an honorary degree from La Trobe University for his contribution to Australia's cultural life.

Kane is included in a volume of interviews of writers and intellectuals by Cassandra Atherton, In So Many Words (2013), which also features Noam Chomsky, Howard Zinn, Camille Paglia and Harold Bloom.

== Reception ==
"Kane's big third collection presents poems as well crafted as any these days, as well as a wonderfully appealing persona. His poetic voice is modest, reporting ruminatively rather than solipsistically within the flow of personal experience. There's no missing his intelligence—or his cultivation. 'Psyche,' the long poem at this book's center, attests to his strengths rather magnificently....Perhaps Coleridge, were he with us now, would write such a poem."

"The special paradox of Kane's achievement is to have crafted a form of address as deceptively open as Walt Whitman's, while being as edgy and as spiritually cryptic as Emily Dickinson."

"There are so many influences and traditions underpinning this work, yet it speaks to a reader with simplicity and clarity, so that one comes not merely to enjoy, but to value its irony and its philosophical refinement."

Farisa Khalid described A Passing Bell collection as an "emotional work" which "takes a leap into the dark and clarifying realm of pain and hope.”

== Bibliography ==
=== Poetry ===
Collections

- 1989 The Farther Shore. George Braziller
- 2000 Drowned Lands. University of South Carolina Press
- 2006 Psyche: A Poem. Warwick Publications
- 2007 Work Life: New Poems. Turtle Point Press
- 2008 A Slant of Light. Whitmore Press (Australia)
- 2011 The Scholar's Rock, trans. Shaoyang & Renlan Zhang. Otherland (Australia)
- 2014 Hafiz: Twelve Ghazals, illus. Tina Kane. Warwick Publications
- 2016 Welcome Light. Audubon Terrace Press
- 2017 Across the Way: Selected Poems in Chinese Translation. Beijing: 21st Century Publishing Group. Trans. Shaoyang Zhang
- 2017 Renga: 100 Poems, with John Kinsella. GloriaSMH Press (Australia)
- 2018 A Passing Bell: Ghazals for Tina. White Crane Press (Australia)
- 2019 A Passing Bell: Ghazals for Tina. George Braziller
- 2022 Earth, Air, Water, Fire. Warwick Publications

List of poems

Title	Year	First published	Reprinted/collected
Before dawn at Maryborough	1996	Kane, Paul (January–February 1996). "Before dawn at Maryborough". Quadrant. 40 (1–2): 20.	

=== Non-fiction ===
- 1994 Ralph Waldo Emerson: Collected Poems & Translations. Harold Bloom & Paul Kane, eds., The Library of America
- 1996 Australian Poetry: Romanticism and Negativity. Cambridge UP
- 1996 Ralph Waldo Emerson: Essays and Poems. Harold Bloom & Paul Kane, eds., Library of America
- 2004 Vintage. Donata Carrazza & Paul Kane, eds., Hardie Grant Books
- 2005 Letters to Les. Donata Carrazza & Paul Kane, eds. Sunnyland Press
- 2012 Poetry of the American Renaissance. George Braziller

=== Collaborations ===
- 1993 A Hudson Landscape. Photographs by William Clift. Santa Fe: William Clift Editions
- 1994 Tears For Columbia, music by Chet Kane, Glitterhouse Records
- 2006 Three Songs on Poems by Paul Kane, Richard Wilson, premiere 12 May 2006, Vassar College
- 2012 Mont St. Michel and Shiprock, photographs by William Clift, Peramain Press
- 2013 Seven Catastrophes in Four Movements, music by Katie O'Looney. Farpoint Recordings
- 2016 Unspoken Words, libretto; music by Lewis Spratlan, for Festival of Music and the Arts, The Presbyterian Church of Chestnut Hill, PA, performed and recorded 4 November 2017
- 2017 Common Ground, libretto; music by Lewis Spratlan. In Seven Responses, commissioned by The Crossing, Philadelphia, PA. Performances at Episcopal Cathedral, Philadelphia, and Lincoln Center, Mostly Mozart Festival, New York. CD, The Crossing: Philadelphia, 2016
- 2022 Earth, Air, Water, Fire: A Poetry Soundscape, music by Katie O’Looney. Farpoint Recordings

== Awards and honors ==
Over the course of his career, Paul Kane has won a variety of awards for poetry and teaching. While he was a student at Yale, he won the university's McLaughlin English Prize in 1970, and in 1973, he was appointed Class Poet. In 1984, he won a Fulbright Post-Graduate Grant, and in 1985, the Schweitzer Prize Preceptorship in Poetics from New York University. The following year, he was awarded Yale University's university fellowship. In 1987, he received a Literature Board Project Grant from the Australia Council, and in 1990, he was elected to PEN America. In 1989, Kane was an Expert-in-Residence at Hamilton College in Australia and a Guest Fellow at Ezra Stiles college at his alma mater, Yale University. In 1998, he was awarded both an NEH Fellowship from the National Endowment for the Humanities and a Guggenheim Fellowship from the John Simon Guggenheim Memorial Foundation. In 2000, Paul Kane was a visiting scholar at Monash University in Australia. In 2007, he was awarded the Philip Hodgins Memorial Medal for Service in Mildura, Australia. In 2012, he received an Initiative Grant Literature Board of the Australia Council for the Arts and was an artist-in-residence at The Guesthouse Arts Collective in Cork, Ireland. In 2012, Kane was also appointed as Poet Laureate of Orange County, New York. In 2013, The Liguria Study Center in Bogliasco, Italy awarded Kane with its Bogliasco Fellowship. In 2013, Paul Kane was awarded an Honorary Doctorate (honoris causa) from La Trobe University in Melbourne, Australia. The Australian government awarded him The Order of Australia (AM) in 2022 “for “significant service to literature, particularly through the promotion of Australian arts, poetry, and emerging talent.”
