= Susan Strome =

American geneticists

- Education: University of Washington
- Awards: Guggenheim Fellowship, 1998
- Scientific career
- Fields: Developmental genetics
- Workplaces: University of California Santa Cruz
- Thesis: Translational control of bacteriophage T7 gene expression (1979)
- Website: bio.research.ucsc.edu/people/strome/Site1/Home.html

Susan Strome is a Distinguished Professor of Molecular, Cell, and Developmental Biology at the University of California Santa Cruz. Strome received a B.A. degree in chemistry from University of New Mexico and a Ph.D. in biochemistry from the University of Washington, as well as post-graduate work at the University of Colorado Boulder. Strome is a member of the American Academy of Arts and Sciences and the National Academy of Sciences.

Strome received a Guggenheim Fellowship in 1998.

== Research ==
Strome's work in developmental genetics investigates how germ cells are established and maintain identity, immortality, and potency from parent to offspring. Her research uses Caenorhabditis elegans, a worm, as a model system.

== Selected publications ==
- Li, S. (2004-01-23). "A Map of the Interactome Network of the Metazoan C. elegans". Science. 303 (5657): 540–543. Bibcode:2004Sci...303..540L. doi:10.1126/science.1091403. ISSN 0036-8075. PMC 1698949. PMID 14704431.
- Gerstein, M. B.; Lu, Z. J.; Van Nostrand, E. L.; Cheng, C.; Arshinoff, B. I.; Liu, T.; Yip, K. Y.; Robilotto, R.; Rechtsteiner, A.; Ikegami, K.; Alves, P. (2010-12-24). "Integrative Analysis of the Caenorhabditis elegans Genome by the modENCODE Project". Science. 330 (6012): 1775–1787. Bibcode:2010Sci...330.1775G. doi:10.1126/science.1196914. ISSN 0036-8075. PMC 3142569. PMID 21177976.
- Strome, Susan; Wood, William B. (1983). "Generation of asymmetry and segregation of germ-line granules in early C. elegans embryos". Cell. 35 (1): 15–25. doi:10.1016/0092-8674(83)90203-9. ISSN 0092-8674. PMID 6684994.
- Strome, S.; Wood, W. B. (1982-03-01). "Immunofluorescence visualization of germ-line-specific cytoplasmic granules in embryos, larvae, and adults of Caenorhabditis elegans". Proceedings of the National Academy of Sciences. 79 (5): 1558–1562. Bibcode:1982PNAS...79.1558S. doi:10.1073/pnas.79.5.1558. ISSN 0027-8424. PMC 346014. PMID 7041123.
