= Rene Dacquel =

Filipino boxer

Personal information
- Nickname: Commander
- Nationality: Filipino
- Born: 23 January 1991 (age 35) Manabo, Abra, Philippines
- Height: 5 ft 4 1/2 in (164 cm)
- Weight: Flyweight; Super-flyweight; Bantamweight

Boxing career
- Stance: Orthodox

Boxing record
- Total fights: 31
- Wins: 20
- Win by KO: 6
- Losses: 10
- Draws: 1

Rene Dasalla Dacquel (born 23 January 1991) is a Filipino professional boxer who held the WBC-OPBF super-flyweight title from 2016 to 2018. He reached a career high ranking of fifth for the IBF and tenth for the WBC at super-flyweight.

== Professional career ==
In his first attempt at the OPBF Super Flyweight title, Dacquel lost to eventual world champion Takuma Inoue.

He later won the title defeating Go Onaga (elevating his former interim title status). Dacquel ultimately lost the title along with an attempt to win the World Boxing Association Oriental Super Flyweight title by decision to Andrew Moloney.

Dacquel has suffered a string of losses, including a loss to eventual world title challenger Jeo Santisima.

== Professional boxing record ==
31 fights	20 wins	10 losses
By knockout	6	2
By decision	14	8
Draws	1	

No.	Result	Record	Opponent	Type	Round, Time	Date	Location	Notes
31	Loss	20–10–1	Jeo Santisima	RTD	3 (10), 3:00	14 Dec 2019	Bogo City (Celestino Martinez Sr.) Sports & Cultural Complex, Bogo, Philippines	Dacquel decided not to continue fighting after the third round
30	Loss	20–9–1	Giovanni Escaner	RTD	5 (12), 3:00	22 Dec 2018	Elorde Sports Center, Parañaque City, Philippines	For vacant PGAB bantamweight title
29	Loss	20–8–1	Yanga Sigqibo	SD	12	27 Jul 2018	International Convention Centre, East London, South Africa	For vacant WBC International super flyweight title
28	Loss	20–7–1	Andrew Moloney	UD	12	24 Feb 2018	St Kilda Town Hall, Melbourne, Australia	Lost OPBF super flyweight title
27	Win	20–6–1	Hayato Kimura	UD	12	19 Jul 2017	Korakuen Hall, Tokyo, Japan	Retained OPBF super flyweight title
26	Win	19–6–1	Shota Kawaguchi	SD	12	2 Apr 2017	EDION Arena Osaka, Osaka, Japan	Retained OPBF super flyweight title
25	Win	18–6–1	Go Onaga	UD	12	21 Aug 2016	Prefectural Budokan, Naha, Japan	Won OPBF super flyweight title
24	Win	17–6–1	Lucky Tor Buamas	TKO	9 (12), 2:00	1 Apr 2016	Negros Occidental (Onyok Velasco) Multi-Purpose Gym, Bacolod, Philippines	Won vacant OPBF Silver super flyweight title
23	Win	16–6–1	Mateo Handig	UD	10	20 Feb 2016	Taguig Sports Complex, Bagumbayan, Taguig City, Philippines	
22	Loss	15–6–1	Takuma Inoue	UD	12	29 Dec 2015	Ariake Colosseum, Tokyo, Japan	For OPBF super flyweight title
21	Win	15–5–1	Thembelani Nxoshe	UD	12	28 Aug 2015	Mdantsane Indoor Center, East London, South Africa	Won vacant IBO International super flyweight title
20	Loss	14–5–1	Jonas Sultan	UD	12	11 Jul 2015	Mandaluyong Gym, Mandaluyong Sports Center, Mandaluyong City, Philippines	Lost PGAB super flyweight title
19	Win	14–4–1	Melvin Gumban	SD	12	25 Apr 2015	Super Metro Department Store & Supermarket, Lapu-Lapu City, Philippines	Won PGAB super flyweight title
18	Win	13–4–1	Menard Abila	TKO	7 (10), 2:57	31 Jan 2015	Mandaluyong Gym, Mandaluyong Sports Center, Mandaluyong City, Philippines	
17	Loss	12–4–1	Jhaleel Payao	UD	10	9 Dec 2014	Olivarez Sports Complex, Barangay San Dionisio, Parañaque City, Philippines	Lost WBC Youth super flyweight title
16	Win	12–3–1	Menard Abila	KO	8 (10), 2:51	4 Oct 2014	Barangay Pook Covered Court, Taal, Philippines	Won WBC Youth super flyweight title
15	Draw	11–3–1	Ryotaro Kawabata	SD	10	21 Jul 2014	Budokan, Okayama City, Japan	For vacant WBC Youth super flyweight title
14	Win	11–3	Albert Alcoy	MD	10	27 Mar 2014	Makati Cinema Square Boxing Arena, Makati City, Philippines	Won vacant LuzProBa super flyweight title
13	Loss	10–3	Hideyuki Watanabe	MD	8	10 Dec 2013	Korakuen Hall, Tokyo, Japan	
12	Loss	10–2	Angelito Merin	UD	10	21 Sep 2013	Alabang 400 Village Multipurpose Gymnasium, Muntinlupa City, Philippines	For vacant WBC Youth super flyweight title
11	Win	10–1	Yuki Nasu	TKO	6 (8), 2:05	23 Jul 2013	Korakuen Hall, Tokyo, Japan	
10	Win	9–1	Rissan Muelas	TKO	7 (10), 2:19	13 Apr 2013	The Flash Grand Ballroom of the Elorde Sports Complex, Parañaque City, Philippines	
9	Win	8–1	Junjie Lauza	UD	6	9 Mar 2013	Indiana Court, Barangay Bagong Silang, Caloocan City, Philippines	
8	Win	7–1	Mark Joseph Costa	UD	8	17 Jan 2013	Wawa Basketball Court Barangay Santo Niño, Parañaque City, Philippines	
7	Win	6–1	Roy Albaera	KO	3 (8), 1:52	28 Oct 2012	The Flash Grand Ballroom of the Elorde Sports Complex, Parañaque City, Philippines	
6	Win	5–1	Mabert Paulino	UD	6	8 Sep 2012	The Flash Grand Ballroom of the Elorde Sports Complex, Parañaque City, Philippines	
5	Win	4–1	Mabert Paulino	UD	6	14 Jul 2012	The Flash Grand Ballroom of the Elorde Sports Complex, Parañaque City, Philippines	
4	Win	3–1	Mabert Paulino	UD	6	12 May 2012	The Flash Grand Ballroom of the Elorde Sports Complex, Parañaque City, Philippines	
3	Win	2–1	Herman Rubio	UD	4	10 Mar 2012	Elorde Sports Center, Parañaque City, Philippines	
2	Loss	1–1	Angelito Merin	SD	4	16 Sep 2011	South Greenheights Covered Court, Muntinlupa City, Philippines	
1	Win	1–0	James Delos Reyes	TD	4 (4), 1:04	9 Aug 2011	Kambal Kamao Gym, Barangay Tangway, Lipa City, Philippines	Technical split decision
