= Jeo Santisima =

Filipino boxer

Personal information
- Nickname: Santino
- Nationality: Filipino
- Born: Jeo Tupas Santisima; 28 May 1996 (age 30) Aroroy, Masbate, Philippines
- Height: 5 ft 6 in (168 cm)
- Weight: Super-bantamweight; Featherweight; Super-Featherweight; Lightweight

Boxing career
- Reach: 67 1/2 in (171 cm)
- Stance: Orthodox

Boxing record
- Total fights: 38
- Wins: 27
- Win by KO: 23
- Losses: 11

Jeo Tupas Santisima (born 28 May 1996) is a Filipino professional boxer who challenged for the WBO super-bantamweight title in February 2020.

== Professional career ==
Santisima defeated Rene Dacquel in four rounds. This set up a world title opportunity for Santisima.

Santisima challenged Emanuel Navarrete for the WBO junior featherweight world title, where he lost by technical knockout in his first knockout loss. This fight was on the Deontay Wilder vs. Tyson Fury II Pay Per View undercard and was Santisima's first fight in the United States.

== Professional boxing record ==
38 fights	27 wins	11 losses
By knockout	23	3
By decision	4	8

No.	Result	Record	Opponent	Type	Round, Time	Date	Location	Notes
38	Loss	27–11	Danylo Honcharuk	RTD	8 (10)	7 Nov 2026	Ho Chi Minh City, The Grand Ho Tram, Vietnam	For the vacant WBC Asian Lightweight title
37	Win	27–10	Alvin Lagumbay	TKO	4 (6)	23 Aug 2026	Villa Kristen Hotel and Resort, General Santos, Philippines	
36	Loss	26–10	Mikhail Grigoryan	UD	10	17 Apr 2026	Sport Palace "Nadezhda", Serpukhov, Russia	For IBF Asia lightweight title
35	Loss	26–9	Angelo Peña	UD	10	26 Dec 2025	Kursaal Arena, Bern, Switzerland	For WBO Inter-Continental super featherweight title
34	Win	26–8	Narumi Yukawa	TKO	6 (8)	7 Sep 2025	Grandship, Shizuoka, Japan	
33	Loss	25–8	Ei Go	UD	8	29 Mar 2025	Aichi Sky Expo, Tokoname, Japan	
32	Win	25–7	Hiro Ichimichi	TKO	3 (8), 2:57	15 Dec 2024	Sumiyoshi Sports Center, Osaka, Japan	
31	Win	24–7	Arnon Yupang	KO	4 (12), 2:01	22 Jun 2024	Cataingan, Masbate, Philippines	Won WBC-ABCO Continental super featherweight title
30	Win	23–7	Pablito Canada	UD	8	26 Jan 2024	Nustar Resort and Casino, Cebu City, Philippines	
29	Loss	22–7	Kenji Fujita	UD	8	12 Oct 2023	Ariake Arena, Tokyo, Japan	
28	Loss	22–6	Hayato Tsutsumi	UD	12	31 May 2023	Korakuen Hall, Tokyo, Japan	For OPBF featherweight title
27	Loss	22–5	Toshiki Shimomachi	UD	10	11 Dec 2022	Edion Arena, Osawa, Japan	
26	Win	22–4	Hiroshige Osawa	TKO	5 (8), 1:56	14 Aug 2022	Edion Arena, Osaka, Japan	
25	Loss	21–4	Joet Gonzalez	TKO	9 (10), 2:05	4 Mar 2022	Save Mart Arena, Fresno, California, USA	For vacant WBO International featherweight title
24	Win	21–3	Alan Alberca	TKO	1 (8), 1:41	16 Jul 2021	Tabunoc Sports Complex, Talisay City, Philippines	
23	Win	20–3	Marjon Piencenaves	KO	2 (8), 0:58	17 Dec 2020	Sanman Gym, General Santos City, Philippines	
22	Loss	19–3	Emanuel Navarrete	TKO	11 (12), 2:20	22 Feb 2020	MGM Grand Garden Arena, Las Vegas, Nevada, USA	For WBO super bantamweight title
21	Win	19–2	Rene Dacquel	RTD	3 (10), 3:00	14 Dec 2019	Bogo City (Celestino Martinez Sr.) Sports & Cultural Complex, Bogo, Philippines	
20	Win	18–2	Alvius Maufani	KO	1 (10), 1:49	17 Aug 2019	Superdome, Ormoc City, Philippines	
19	Win	17–2	Uriel Lopez	UD	12	24 Nov 2018	IEC Convention Center, Cebu City, Philippines	Retained WBO Oriental super bantamweight title
18	Win	16–2	Likit Chane	TKO	3 (12), 1:43	9 Jun 2018	Maasin City Sports Complex (Maasin City Gym), Maasin City, Philippines	Won WBO Oriental super bantamweight title
17	Win	15–2	Kichang Kim	KO	1 (10), 0:56	25 Nov 2017	Bohol Wisdom School Gym, Tagbilaran, Philippines	
16	Win	14–2	Goodluck Mrema	TKO	1 (10), 1:18	8 Jul 2017	IEC Convention Center, Cebu City, Philippines	
15	Win	13–2	Master Suro	UD	10	29 Apr 2017	Cebu City Waterfront Hotel & Casino, Cebu City, Philippines	
14	Win	12–2	Rex Wao	TKO	5 (10), 2:28	26 Nov 2016	Cebu Coliseum, Cebu City, Philippines	
13	Win	11–2	Junior Bejawa	KO	3 (10), 1:31	16 Jul 2016	Mandaue City Sports and Cultural Complex, Mandaue City, Philippines	
12	Win	10–2	Tabthong Tor Buamas	TKO	1 (6), 2:59	23 Apr 2016	Cebu City Sports Complex, Cebu City, Philippines	
11	Win	9–2	Marco Demecillo	TKO	6 (8), 1:07	27 Feb 2016	Cebu Waterfront Hotel & Casino, Cebu City, Philippines	
10	Win	8–2	Jerry Nardo	TKO	2 (10), 2:46	30 Dec 2015	Mayor Esperanza Binghay Memorial Complex, Balamban, Philippines	
9	Win	7–2	Alan Alberca	KO	5 (10), 2:57	30 Sep 2015	Mayor Esperanza Binghay Memorial Complex, Balamban, Philippines	
8	Win	6–2	Pete Apolinar	KO	1 (8), 1:26	6 Jun 2015	Marcelo Barba Sports Complex, Toledo City, Philippines	
7	Win	5–2	Boyce Sultan	RTD	5 (8), 3:00	21 Feb 2015	Murcia Sports and Cultural Center, Murcia, Philippines	
6	Win	4–2	John Rey Melligen	KO	1 (6)	18 Dec 2014	Molo Covered Gym, Iloilo City, Philippines	
5	Win	3–2	Roland Magluyan	TKO	2 (6), 1:22	8 Sep 2014	Plaridel Covered Court, Plaridel, Philippines	
4	Loss	2–2	Marlon Arcilla	MD	6	14 May 2014	Hyatt Hotel, Manila, Philippines	
3	Win	2–1	Jamjam Ungon	KO	2 (4), 2:41	7 Dec 2013	Freedom Park, Dumaguete, Philippines	
2	Win	1–1	Takaomi Noma	UD	4	25 Sep 2013	Poblacion Balamban Sports Complex, Balamban, Philippines	
1	Loss	0–1	Roniel Parcon	UD	4	24 Aug 2013	Escalente City Coliseum, Escalente City, Philippines	
