= Dennis Kardon =

American painter (born 1950)

- Born: 1950 (age 75–76); Des Moines, Iowa, U.S.
- Education: Yale University (BA); Yale School of Art
- Occupation: Painter
- Spouse: Shelley Lewis
- Children: 1

Dennis Kardon (born 1950) is an American painter based in Brooklyn, New York. The New York Times's Ken Johnson has described Dennis Kardon's paintings as "generously painterly, voluptuously creepy narrative pictures of familial conflict, sexual angst and infantile yearning." Kardon's work has been exhibited widely in the United States and abroad.

== Background and education ==
Kardon was born in Des Moines, Iowa. In 1973, he graduated from Yale University with a B.A. degree in Visual Arts. In his final year at Yale, he participated in the Whitney Museum Independent Study Program. He also attended the Yale School of Art at the Norfolk summer program, studying with Al Held, Judy Pfaff and Chuck Close.

== Life and work ==
Kardon began exhibiting his work in the 1970s. His early black and white cut-paper pieces, shown at the Drawing Center (1980) and Barbara Toll Fine Art (1981), played with figure-ground relationships.

His woodblock prints were included in a 1983 exhibition at the Museum of Modern Art called Prints from Blocks: Gauguin to Now. Kardon's figurative paintings were first exhibited in 1983 at the Massachusetts Institute of Technology in Nude, Naked, Stripped, organized by Dana Friis-Hansen. Kardon was awarded a Louis Comfort Tiffany Foundation grant in 1991.

49 Jewish Noses, Kardon's best-known piece, gained attention in the exhibition Too Jewish, Challenging Traditional Identities at the Jewish Museum in 1996. Organized by Norman Kleeblatt, the exhibition traveled to museums in the United States and abroad, including the Hammer Museum and museums in Berlin, Munich, Vienna, and Bruges. Kardon's subjects included artist Nan Goldin, gallerist Helene Winer, and the then-director of the Whitney Museum, David Ross, among other notable Jewish people.

In 1996, Kardon received the Milton Avery fellowship to the Yaddo artist colony, and in 1998 was awarded a Guggenheim Fellowship. Kardon's large psychological paintings of family life from the late 1990s onwards have been exhibited at the Mitchell Algus Gallery (New York) and reviewed in The New York Times and Art in America. His work is also included in the book Being Human: Lucian Freud, Ann Hamilton, Lillian Hsu-Flanders, Dennis Kardon, Sol LeWitt, Ana Mendieta, Laurie Simmons, Kiki Smith, from an exhibition at the Museum of Fine Arts, Boston. Kardon's own writing and art reviews have been featured in Hyperallergic, Art in America, artcritical, artnet and The Brooklyn Rail.

Kardon's work is included in the collections of the Museum of Modern Art, the Metropolitan Museum of Art, the Brooklyn Museum, and the Fogg Art Museum, among many others. Dennis Kardon is represented by Massimo De Carlo gallery. Kardon currently teaches at the School of Visual Arts in New York. He is married to Shelley Lewis, a television producer and executive. The couple have one daughter.
