= Barbara Burgess =

American biologist

Barbara Kathryn Burgess
- Born: December 31, 1950; Cleveland
- Died: December 30, 2001
- Occupation: Biologist

Barbara Kathryn Burgess (December 31, 1950 – December 30, 2001) was an American biologist known for her work in the fields of metallobiochemistry and nitrogen fixation. She was a professor of Molecular Biology and Biochemistry at University of California, Irvine.

== Early life and education ==
Burgess was born and raised in Cleveland and attended public school throughout her childhood. She matriculated at Purdue University at the age of 17 and graduated in three years; she remained there for her doctoral studies in biochemistry and microbiology and graduated with her Ph.D. at 25. Her doctoral thesis concerned nitrogen fixation and the mechanisms involved in each reaction.

== Career and research ==
After a brief stint at the Kettering Research Lab in Yellow Springs, Ohio, Burgess moved to the University of California, Irvine to continue her work with Azotobacter metalloenzymes and nitrogenase. Her work also influenced the field of iron-sulfur proteins. She was recognized by her peers as a leader in nitrogen fixation and served as Chair of the NIH Study Section on Metallobiochemistry and Chair of the 2001 Gordon Conference on Metals in Biology.

Her research includes The iron-molubdenum cofactor of nitrogenase, Mechanism of Molybdenum Nitrogenase, Large-scale purification of high activity Azotobacter vinelandii nitrogenase and many more prominently cited research.

She took her own life on December 30, 2001, leaving a husband and 3 children.

== Honors and awards ==
- 1998 Guggenheim Fellow
- Fulbright Fellow
- Fellow, American Association for the Advancement of Science
- Lauds and Laurels Faculty Achievement Award, UC Irvine (posthumous)
- Chair, National Institutes of Health Study Section on Metallobiochemistry

== See also ==
- John P. Burgess
