= Paula Richman =

Indian American academic, author, and editor

Academic background
- Education: Oberlin College (BA); Princeton University (MA); University of Chicago (PhD)
- Thesis: Religious Rhetoric in Maṇimēkalai (1983)
- Academic advisor: Edward C. Dimock

Academic work
- Discipline: Religious studies scholar
- Sub-discipline: Indian religions; Tamil studies
- Institutions: Swarthmore College; Western Washington University; Colby College; Oberlin College

Paula Richman is an Emerita William H. Danforth Professor of South Asian Religions at Oberlin College. She is an expert in the Tamil language and has edited a series of books about the Ramayana, including Many Ramayanas, Questioning Ramayana, Ramayana Stories in Modern South India and Performing the Ramayana Tradition.

== Education ==
Richman completed her undergraduate degree at Oberlin College in 1974, an MA at Princeton University and the University of Chicago, followed by a PhD at the University of Chicago and a research affiliation with the Tamil Department at the American College in Madurai, India. She began her study of the Ramayana and the Tamil language during her education. She studied Tamil for two years in Coimbatore and Madurai.

== Career ==
Richman was faculty at Swarthmore College, Western Washington University, and Colby College before becoming a member of the faculty at Oberlin College in 1985. In 1997, she was named to the Irvin E. Houck professorship in Humanities for a period of five years. During her career, she traveled to conduct lectures, including to India and Copenhagen.

Richman and her co-editor Rustom Bharucha spent eight years developing the book Performing the Ramayana Tradition: Enactments, Interpretations and Arguments, which includes essays, photographs, interviews, and scripts for theatrical productions, and was published in 2021.

== Works ==
- Bynum, Caroline Walker; Harrell, Stevan; Richman, Paula, eds. (1986). Gender and Religion: On the Complexity of Symbols. Boston: Beacon Press.
- Richman, Paula (1988). Women, Branch Stories, and Religious Rhetoric in a Tamil Buddhist Text. Syracuse: Maxwell School of Citizenship and Public Affairs, Syracuse University.
- Richman, Paula, ed. (1991). Many Rāmāyanas. Berkeley: University of California Press.
- Cutler, Norman; Richman, Paula, eds. (1992). A Gift of Tamil: Translations from Tamil Literature. In Honor of K. Paramasivam. Manohar: American Institute of Indian Studies.
- Richman, Paula (1997). Extraordinary Child: Poems from a South Indian Devotional Genre. Honolulu: University of Hawai'i Press.
- Richman, Paula, ed. (2001). Questioning Ramayanas: A South Asian Tradition. Berkeley: University of California Press.
- Richman, Paula, ed. (2008). Ramayana Stories in Modern South India: An Anthology. Bloomington: Indiana University Press. ISBN 978-0-253-21953-4.
- Richman, Paula; Bharucha, Rustom, eds. (2021). Performing the Ramayana Tradition: Enactments, Interpretations, and Arguments. Oxford University Press. ISBN 9780197552506.
