= Gisela von Wobeser =

Mexican historian (born 1944)

Director of the Academia Mexicana de la Historia
- In office 2003–2011

Personal details
- Born: 23 January 1944 (age 82) Mexico City, Mexico
- Education: School of Philosophy and Letters, UNAM
- Occupation: Historian
- Awards: Member of the Academia Mexicana de la Historia (1992); Member of the Mexican Academy of Sciences (1993); Guggenheim Fellow (1999)

Academic background
- Thesis: La industria azucarera en la región de Cuernavaca-Cuautla durante la epoca colonial (1986)

Academic work
- Discipline: History
- Sub-discipline: New Spain
- Institutions: National Autonomous University of Mexico

Gisela von Wobeser Hoepfner (born 23 January 1944) is a Mexican historian. An alumna of School of Philosophy and Letters, UNAM, she is a former professor at UNAM and has published several history books on New Spain. She is a member of the Academia Mexicana de la Historia (of which she was director from 2003 until 2011) and Mexican Academy of Sciences, as well as a 1999 Guggenheim Fellow.

== Biography ==
Gisela von Wobeser Hoepfner was born on 23 January 1944 in Mexico City. She was educated at the School of Philosophy and Letters, UNAM, where she got her BA (1969), MA (1978), and PhD (1986) in History. Her dissertation is titled La industria azucarera en la región de Cuernavaca-Cuautla durante la epoca colonial.

In 1979, she began teaching at UNAM, and she was promoted to professor in 1989. She became a researcher at the Institute of Historical Research in 1980, where she was director from 1989 until 1997. She was director of the Casa de las Humanidades from 2000 until 2006.

As an academic, she has published several books and articles on the history of New Spain, including El crédito eclesiástico en la Nueva España, siglo XVIII (1994) and Orígenes del culto a nuestra señora de Guadalupe, 1521-1688 (2020). In 1999, she was awarded a Guggenheim Fellowship "for a study of the social and economic function of church property in 18th-century New Spain".

In 1992, she was elected a member of the Academia Mexicana de la Historia (AMH), where she holds the 26th seat. She served as secretary from 1996 to 2003. In 2003, she was appointed director of the AMH, a position she held until 2011. She is also a member of the Mexican Academy of Sciences (1993), the Mexican Committee of Historical Sciences (1996), and the Mexican Society of Bibliophiles (2010), as well as a corresponding member of the Paraguayan Academy of History (2003), the Chilean Academy of History (28 October 2003), the Puerto Rican Academy of History (2003), the Portuguese Academy of History (2005), the Historical and Geographical Institute of Uruguay (2005), the National Academy of History of Ecuador (2006), the Real Academia Sevillana de Buenas Letras (2010), and the National Academy of History of Argentina (2010).

== Books ==
- La formación de la hacienda en la época colonial: El uso de la tierra y el agua (1983)
- El crédito eclesiástico en la Nueva España, siglo XVIII (1994)
- Orígenes del culto a nuestra señora de Guadalupe, 1521-1688 (2020)
