= Four Core Genotypes mouse model =

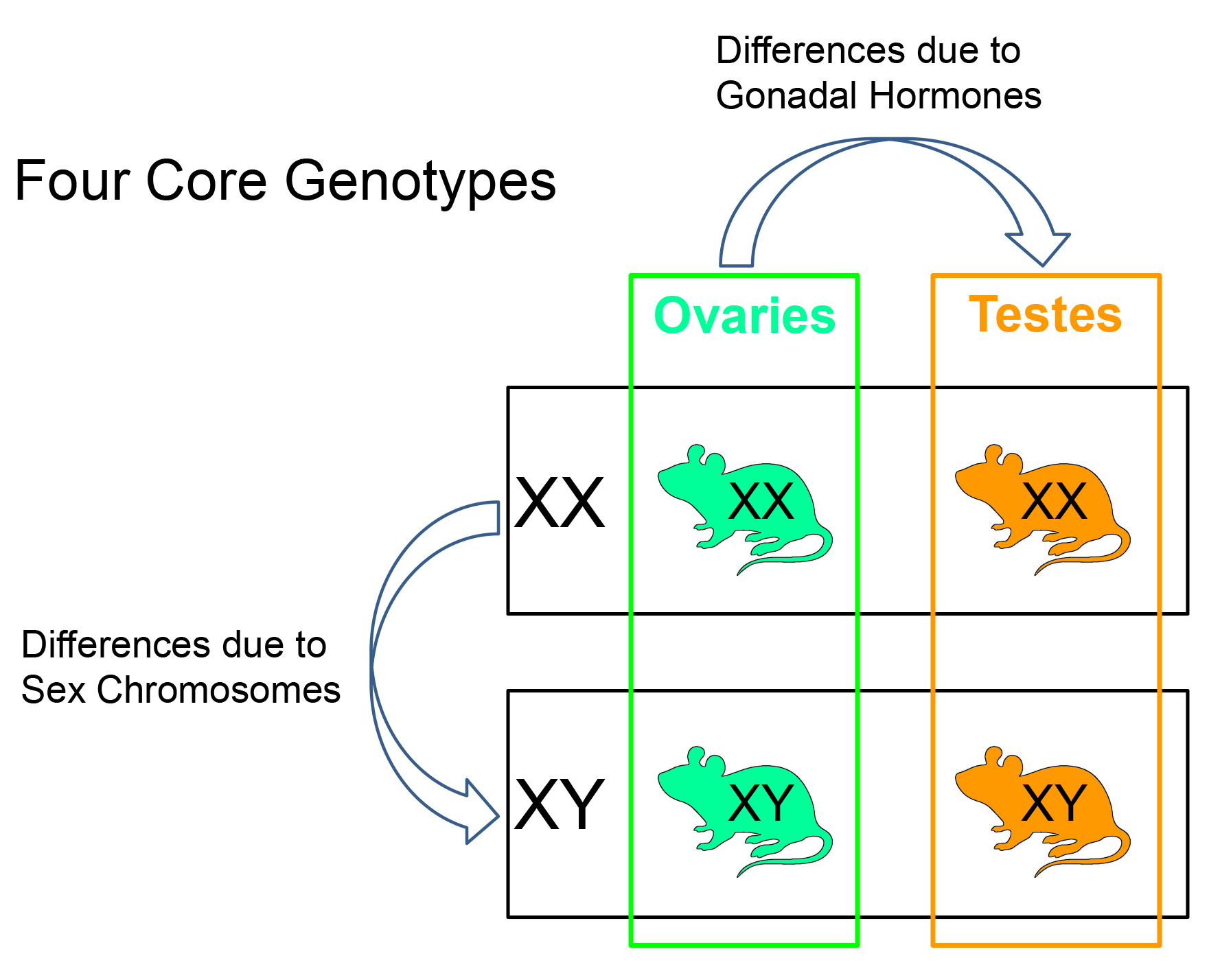
The Four Core Genotypes mouse model produces four types of offspring. Mice with ovaries (green) can have XX or XY sex chromosomes. Mice with testes (orange) can have XX or XY sex chromosomes. A difference in phenotype in mice with different sex chromosomes (XX vs. XY) shows a sex chromosome effect. A difference in phenotype in mice with different type of gonad shows the effects of gonadal hormones.

Four Core Genotypes (FCG) mice are laboratory mice produced by genetic engineering that allow biomedical researchers to determine if a sex difference in phenotype is caused by effects of gonadal hormones or sex chromosome genes. The four genotypes include XX and XY mice with ovaries, and XX and XY mice with testes. The comparison of XX and XY mice with the same type of gonad reveals sex differences in phenotypes that are caused by sex chromosome genes. The comparison of mice with different gonads but the same sex chromosomes reveals sex differences in phenotypes that are caused by gonadal hormones.

== Development ==
The FCG model was created by Paul Burgoyne and Robin Lovell-Badge at the National Institute for Medical Research, London (now Francis Crick Institute). The model involves deleting the testis-determining gene Sry from the Y chromosome, and inserting Sry onto chromosome 3. Therefore the sex chromosomes no longer determine the type of gonad, so that XX and XY mice can have the same type of gonad and gonadal hormones.

== Significance ==
The FCG model has been used to discover that the XX and XY animals respond differently in models of human physiology and disease, including autoimmunity, metabolism, cardiovascular disease, cancer, Alzheimer’s disease, and neural and behavioral processes. These findings imply that some sex chromosome genes may protect from disease, rationalizing the search for therapies that enhance such protective factors.
