= Donald W. Pfaff =

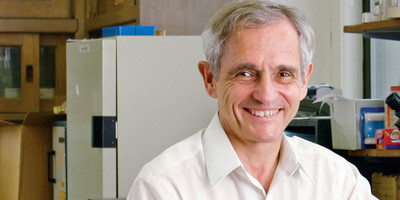
- Born: December 9, 1939; Rochester, New York
- Education: Harvard College; Massachusetts Institute of Technology
- Spouses: Stephanie Strickland; Nina Fedoroff
- Children: 3
- Scientific career
- Fields: Neuroscience
- Workplaces: The Rockefeller University
- Notable students: Robert Lustig

Donald Wells Pfaff is a professor and head of the Laboratory of Neuroscience and Behavior at The Rockefeller University in New York City.

== Early life ==
Donald Pfaff was born in on December 9, 1939. He graduated from Harvard College, magna cum laude (1961), and received a Ph.D. from the Massachusetts Institute of Technology (1965). After further training at MIT and the Marine Biological Laboratory at Woods Hole, he joined The Rockefeller University in 1966 as a post-doctoral fellow. He was appointed assistant professor in 1969, promoted to associate professor in 1971, and gained tenure in 1973. He has been professor and head of the Laboratory of Neurobiology and Behavior since 1978.

== Research ==
Early in his career, Pfaff developed techniques to discover both estrogen and androgen receptors in rat brains. Within 15 years, it was clear that the limbic/hypothalamic system he discovered in rat brains was universal among vertebrate brains as well.

His laboratory worked out the first nerve cell circuit for a mammalian behavior, discovered hormone-sensitive genes in the brain; and integrated these findings to show how specific gene expression in a small part of the brain can regulate behavior. Pfaff also discovered that the nerve cells which control all reproductive processes—neurons that express the gene for the peptide called gonadotropin-releasing hormone (GnRH)—are not born in the brain (as are most neurons), but in the nose, from which they migrate into the brain.

Pfaff also formulated a concept of the fundamental brain processes, “generalized brain arousal” (GA), and studied the development of arousal-related neurons, their anatomy, and neurophysiology.

Pfaff’s lab has published more than 900 research papers, and he has written or edited more than 25 books. Pfaff conceived and edited a comprehensive survey of neuroscience, Neuroscience in the 21st Century, which was distributed electronically without cost, to colleges and medical schools in economically developing countries. Among his books, Estrogens and Brain Function united the fields of endocrinology and neuroscience. Drive demonstrated the mechanisms for a simple reproductive behavior, and argued that the lessons learned informed our understanding of the physiological basis of libido. Brain Arousal and Information Theory addressed the mechanisms that wake up the entire brain as well as their damping down by sleep, anesthesia or traumatic brain injury. The Altruistic Brain, co-written with Dr. Sandra Sherman, argued that altruistic behavior can be considered as a natural neurophysiological phenomenon, and put forth an elegant theory of how such prosocial behaviors can be explained without reference to any unusual neural capacities. How the Vertebrate Brain Regulates Behavior; A Field Develops offers Pfaff’s perspective on his more than fifty years in neuroscience.

He is a member of the Editorial Board for PNAS.

== Honors and awards ==
- Member, National Academy of Sciences, 1992
- Fellow, American Academy of Arts and Sciences, 1994
- National Institutes of Health MERIT Award, 2003
- Award for Excellence in Professional and Scholarly Publishing, Assoc. American Publishers, 2005
- Foundation IPSEN Prize in Neuronal Plasticity, 2010
- Daniel S. Lehrman Lifetime Achievement Award, Society for Behavioral Endocrinology, 2011
