= Piotr Nawrot =

Polish Roman Catholic priest and musicologist

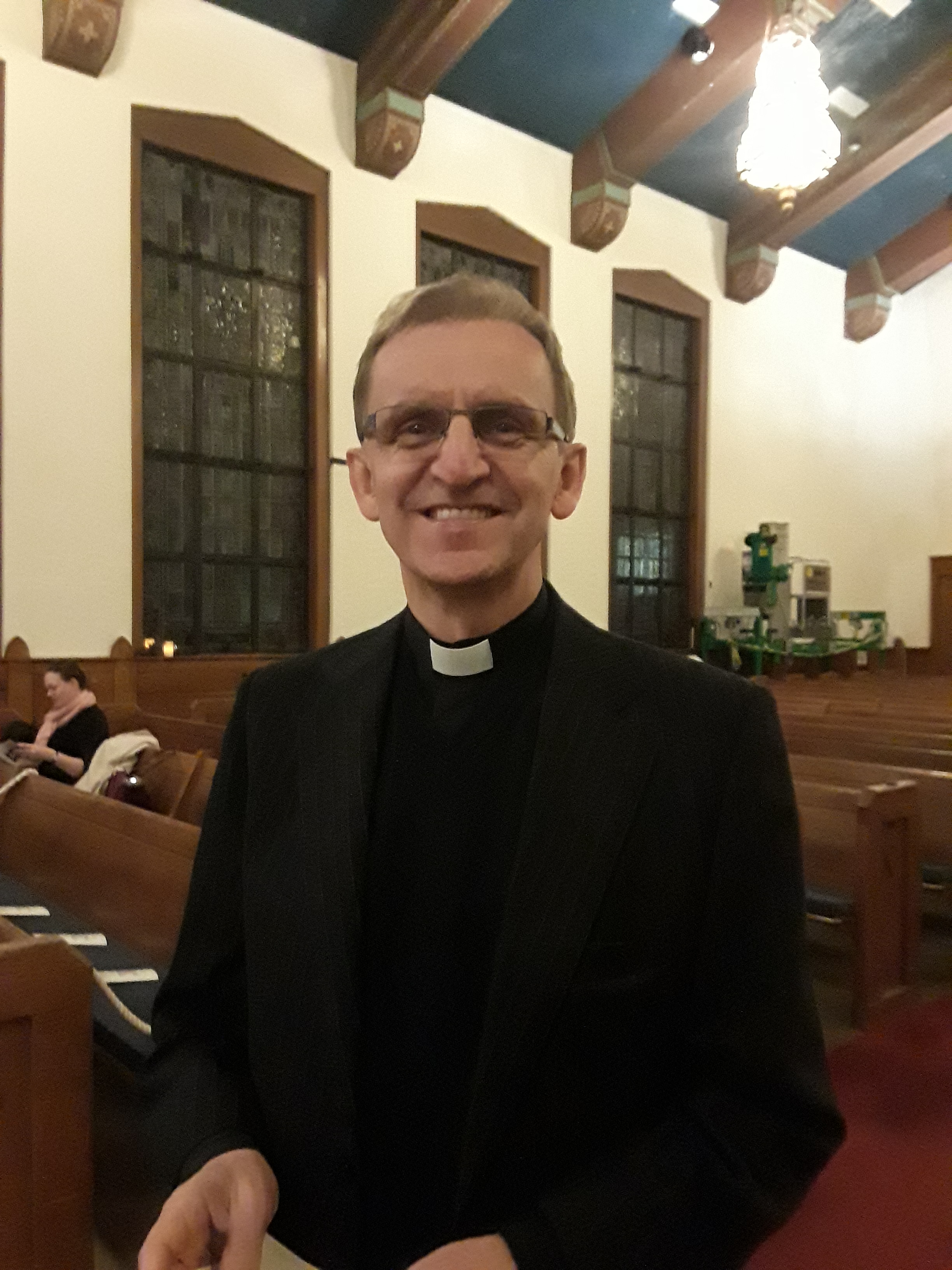
Nawrot before a Capitol Hill Chorale concert of Bolivian Baroque music, December 2018

Piotr Nawrot (born 1955) is a Polish Roman Catholic priest and musicologist, known for his work in the field of Latin American Baroque music.

A native of Poznań, Nawrot joined the Divine Word Missionaries in 1974, achieving ordination in 1981, in the same year earning his degree from the John Paul II Catholic University of Lublin. His first missionary assignment was to Paraguay, where he developed an interest in the reductions established by Jesuit priests in the 17th and 18th centuries. He enrolled in the Catholic University of America in 1986, taking a master's degree in music and a doctorate in musicology. Research undertaken as part of his studies led him to investigate the music left behind by the Jesuits in Bolivia; ultimately he discovered 13,000 pages of music held by members of the Moxo, Chiquito, and other tribes, many in the Santa Cruz Department. He also discovered music in the Convent of Santa Clara in Cochabamba. He has since reconstructed, edited, and published more than thirty volumes of music from the reductions, and continues to preserve and perform it with the assistance of local organizations and the Catholic Church. Nawrot was awarded a Guggenheim Fellowship in 1998 for his musicological work. A member of the Anthropos Institute and the Bolivian Academy of Ecclesiastical History, he became creative director of the International Festival of American Renaissance and Baroque Music, “Misiones de Chiquitos” in 1997. He is also a member of the theology faculty of the Adam Mickiewicz University in Poznań.
