= Kenji Fujita =

Japanese professional boxer (born 1996)

Personal information
- Nationality: Japanese
- Born: 藤田健児; 19 January 1994 (age 32) Kurashiki, Okayama, Japan
- Height: 5 ft 6 in (168 cm)
- Weight: Featherweight

Boxing career
- Stance: Southpaw

Boxing record
- Total fights: 8
- Wins: 8
- Win by KO: 4

Kenji Fujita (藤田健児, Fujita Kenji, born October 19, 1996) is a Japanese professional boxer. He currently competes in the featherweight division where he is the current WBO Asian Pacific featherweight champion.

== Amateur career ==
Fujita had a stellar amateur career, winning the national title ten times He turned pro with a record of 153-21.

== Professional career ==
=== Fujita vs Ambo ===
Fujita claimed his first pro title after he beat Filipino Joseph Ambo over 12 rounds for the vacant WBO Asian Pacific belt. In the twelfth and final round a body punch forced Ambo to turn his back. Despite being counted by the ref he managed to hold on until the final bell rang

=== Fujita vs Piala ===
Fujita made his first defence of his title against Rodez Piala. Despite one of the judges scoring it close, Fujita dominated throughout. Japanese fans gave Piala respect after the fight for his performance. With this win it meant Fujita had beat six Filipino fighters in a row

=== Fujita vs Casama ===
Fujita returned to ring after almost seven months with a hand injury to defend his title for the second time. He stopped Filipino Michael Casama after Casama stayed on his stool after the tenth round. Fujita completely dominated the fight and avoided most of Casamas shots.

== Professional boxing record ==
8 fights	8 wins	0 losses
By knockout	4	0
By decision	4	0

No.	Result	Record	Opponent	Type	Round, time	Date	Location	Notes
8	Win	8–0	(Philippines) Michael Casama	RTD	9 (12), 3:00	18 Jan 2025	Korakuen Hall, Tokyo, Japan	Retained WBO Asia Pacific Featherweight title
7	Win	7–0	(Philippines) Rodex Piala	UD	12	1 Jun 2024	Korakuen Hall, Tokyo, Japan	Retained WBO Asia Pacific Featherweight title
6	Win	6–0	(Philippines) Joseph Ambo	UD	12	20 Jan 2024	Korakuen Hall, Tokyo, Japan	Won vacant WBO Asia Pacific Featherweight title
5	Win	5–0	(Philippines) Jeo Santisima	UD	8	12 Oct 2023	Ariake Arena, Koto-Ku, Tokyo, Japan	
4	Win	4–0	(Philippines) Daniel Nicolas	TKO	2 (8), 0:54	3 Jun 2023	Korakuen Hall, Tokyo, Japan	
3	Win	3–0	(Philippines) Ronnie Campos	KO	4 (8), 2:59	1 Oct 2022	Korakuen Hall, Tokyo, Japan	
2	Win	2–0	(Philippines) Jestine Tesoro	UD	6	2 Jul 2022	Korakuen Hall, Tokyo, Japan	
1	Win	1–0	(Japan) Motosuke Kimura	TKO	6 (6), 2:38	25 Mar 2021	Korakuen Hall, Tokyo, Japan	
