= Miguel Angel Rios =

Argentine artist (born 1943)

Miguel Ángel Ríos
- Born: 1943; Argentina
- Known for: Interdisciplinary art
- Notable work: Caquetá (2007)
- Movement: Conceptual art

Miguel Ángel Ríos (born 1943, Catamarca, Argentina) is a video and conceptual artist based between New York City and Mexico City, cities he relocated to in the 1970s after fleeing the military dictatorship period in his home country. Ríos is a leading figure in the Latin American contemporary arts scenes, and his work has been shown and collected globally.

== Work ==
Miguel Ángel Ríos graduated from the Academy of Fine Arts in Buenos Aires, Argentina, and soon after moved to New York City, and later to Mexico City. Throughout his career, Ríos has develop an interdisciplinary production of works that responds to ideas of place, politics, and structures of power from a Latin American perspective. He has worked with myriad of languages such as painting, drawings, prints, and objects. However, his extensive video art production, which has been developing since early 2000s, has received major attention.

In 2005, his video On the Edge (2005), a two-channel projection depicting a number of black and white spinning tops, or the trompos as they are named in Spanish, snipping until the fall of the last top, it was presented and later acquired by the Museum of Fine Arts, Houston. In 2013, he was part of the two-person presentation New exhibitions: Miguel Ángel Ríos and Carlos Motta at the Sala de Arte Público Siqueiros - La Tallera, in Mexico.

In 2015, he presented the solo show Landlocked, a retrospective based on his video art work; the show took place at Arizona State University's ASU Art Museum. The three-channel video installation A morir (To the Death) from 2003, is a continuation of the artist's visual investigation of spinning tops drawing a parallel with life cycles and power structures. The video was displayed at the Ackland Art Museum at the University of North Carolina at Chapel Hill.

In 2024, Miguel Ángel Ríos was part of the collections-based video art exhibition The Days That Build Us, at PAMM.TV, a video streaming platform from the Pérez Art Museum Miami. Rios showcased alongside artists Tania Candiani and Rivane Neuenschwander, among others

Rios' work has been shown in solo exhibitions at Miami Art Museum, now known as the Pérez Art Museum Miami, Florida; Dallas Museum of Art; Blaffer Art Museum at the University of Houston; Museum of Contemporary Art, San Diego; California; Hirshhorn Museum and Sculpture Garden, Washington D.C.; Museé d’Art Moderne de (Saint-Étienne), France; Museo de Arte Carrillo Gil, México City; and Museo de Arte Moderno, Buenos Aires, among others.

== Filmography ==
Miguel Ángel Ríos has been widely recognized by his video art practice. His time-based media production is featured in museum collections in the United States and abroad.

- 2002 Ni me busques . . . No me encuentras (Don’t Look For Me . . . You Won’t Find Me)
- 2003 A morir (’til Death)
- 2005 On the Edge, Museum of Fine Arts, Houston, Texas
- 2006 LOVE
- 2007 Caquetá, Pérez Art Museum Miami, Florida
- 2008 Crudo
- 2008 White Suit
- 2010 Mecha (Fuse)
- 2012 The Ghost of Modernity (Lixiviado), Kadist, San Francisco, California
- 2014 Piedras Blancas, Kadist, San Francisco, California

== Collections ==
Miguel Ángel Ríos is featured in the collections of the Museum of Modern Art, New York; the Pérez Art Museum Miami, Florida; the Museum of Fine Arts, Houston, Texas; Kadist, and San Francisco; among others.
