= Etienne Jornod =

Swiss entrepreneur and manager (born 1953)

Etienne Jean Jornod
- Born: January 6, 1953 (age 73); Neuchâtel, Switzerland
- Education: HEC Lausanne (Lic.oec.); Stanford University
- Occupations: former Chairman of the Board of Directors of the pharmaceutical and logistics group Galenica and the NZZ Mediengruppe
- Children: 4

Etienne Jean Jornod (born 6 January 1953 in Neuchâtel, Switzerland) is a Swiss entrepreneur and manager. He was chairman of the Board of Directors of the pharmaceutical and logistics group Galenica and the NZZ Mediengruppe.

Etienne Jornod is, since 2020, the Executive Chairman and Co-owner of OM Pharma.

== Life and education ==
Etienne Jornod grew up in Neuchâtel as the eldest of six children in a family of doctors and completed an apprenticeship as a pharmacist in Biel. He studied business administration at the HEC Lausanne and graduated with a licentiate (lic. Oec). He continued his studies at the Stanford University in the United States (Senior Executive Program).

== Career ==
In 1975, he joined Galenica as a Junior Product Manager, leaving the company in 1978 to study business administration. He returned to the company in 1981 as Assistant to the Directorate General. He has been a member of the Directorate General since 1989, and from 1996 to 2011, he led Galencia's dual mandate as president and Delegate of the board of directors. Since 2012, he has been executive chairman of the board.

From April 2013 to April 2023, he was chairman of the Board of the NZZ-Mediengruppe. He succeeded Franz Steinegger, who had retired from the board after reaching the age for retirement.

Etienne Jornod held other directorships, including President of Vifor Pharma AG and Vifor Fresenius Medical Care Renal Pharma AG. From 2012 to 2017 he was a member of the Board of Directors of Vaudoise Insurance Group. From 2008 to 2009 he was a member of the board of Publigroupe. He was also a directorial member of Alliance Boots.

In May 2020, Jornod stepped down as executive chairman of Vifor Pharma's board of directors after 25 years of service, and was named honorary chairman of the company that same month, after having previously been appointed Honorary Chairman of Galenica in 2017.

In 2020, together with long-term partners, he acquired the Geneva-based biotech company OM Pharma from Vifor Pharma and has since been the company's executive chairman of the board of directors. He is also President of the advisory board of the University of Lucerne.

== Personal life ==
Etienne Jornod is in his second marriage, the father of four children, two of them from his first marriage. He lives in Muri bei Bern.
