= Muri Castle =

Castle in Muri, Bern, Switzerland

- Schloss Muri
- Muri bei Bern
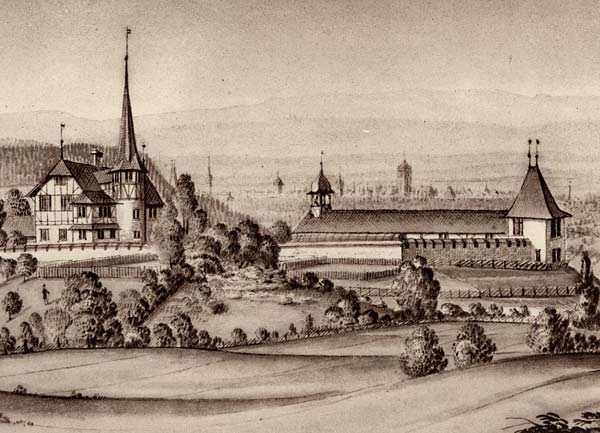
- Muri Castle in 1670

Site information
- Type: Castle
- Owner: private
- Open to the public: no

Location
- Location within Canton of Bern Location within Switzerland
- Coordinates: 46.93106°N 7.48807°E

Site history
- Built: 1650
- Built by: Johann Rudolf von Diesbach

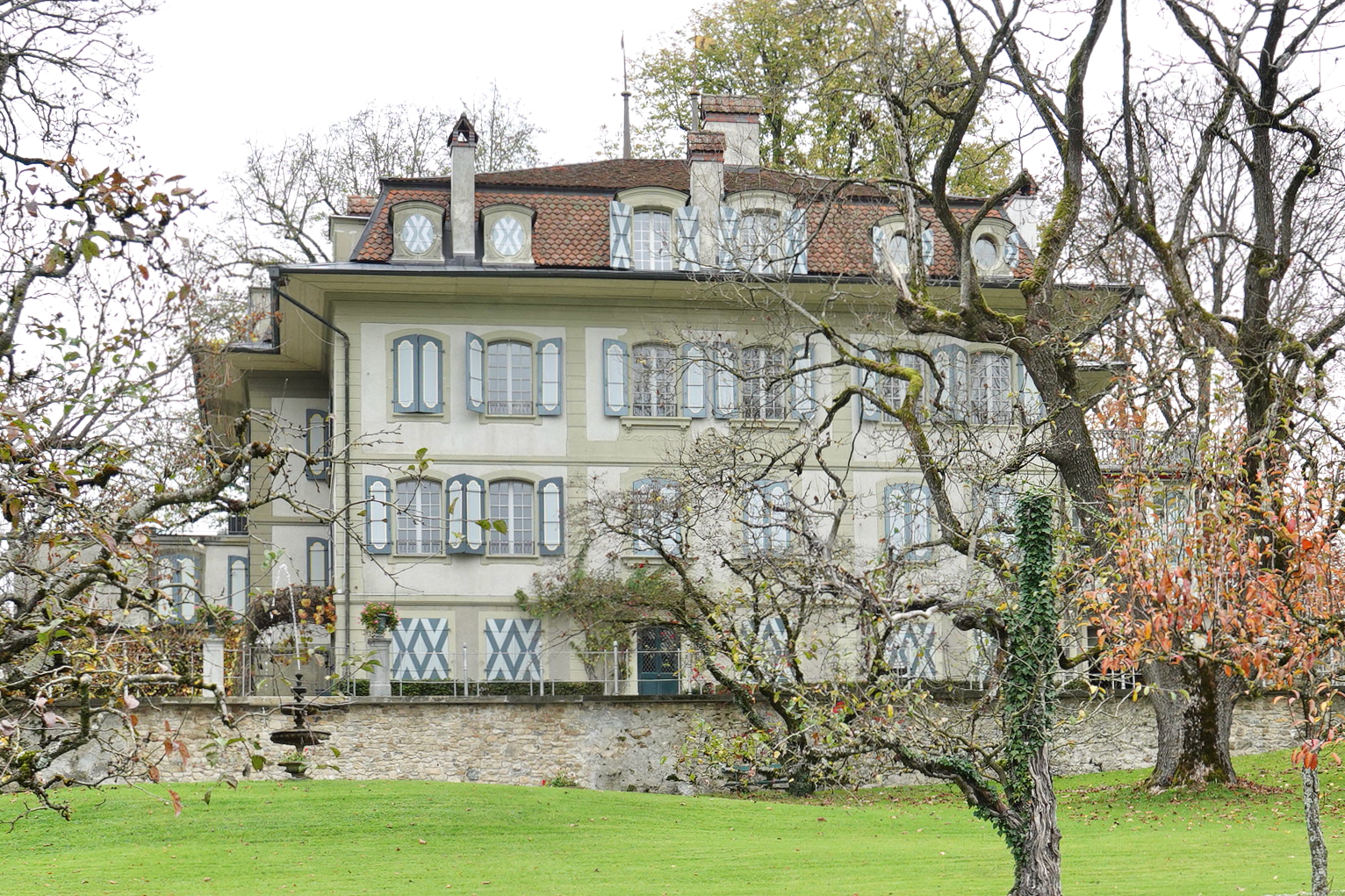
Muri castle in 2024

Muri Castle (German: Schloss Muri) is a castle in the municipality of Muri in the canton of Bern in Switzerland.

== History ==
The castle was probably built in the 16th century on the site of an earlier manor house, though it was rebuilt around 1650 for Johann Rudolf von Diesbach. Von Diesbach had been a colonel in the Swiss Guards in France and after returning to Switzerland was governor of Lenzburg. Due to Muri's proximity to Bern and good weather, it was a popular place for patricians to build mansions. Between 1650 and 1652 von Deisbach bought up land and built the castle.

The earliest known picture of the castle, by Kauw in 1670, shows the compact main building with a pointed stair tower. Next to the main building is a long outbuilding with a small ridge tower and a large tower on the end. The castle was acquired by Albrecht von Mülinen in 1695 and remained with his family until 1758, when it was sold to Abraham Henggi. Henggi rebuilt the main tower beginning in the same year, eventually nearly bankrupting him.

During the French Revolution the Count of Artois, who would later become King Charles X of France, lived in exile at Muri Castle. The Countesses of Polignac Yolande de Polastron, a friend of Marie Antoinette, lived in nearby Gümligen Castle at the same time.

In 1825 the doctor Samuel Lehmann bought the castle. He sold it 24 years later to the banker Ludwig Emanuel von Wagner. Von Wagner expanded and rebuilt the castle between 1851 and 1854. In 1892 the castle was inherited by von Wagner's daughter, Louise Fanny von Ernst, and the six children of his already deceased second daughter. Louise Fanny bought out the other heirs' share of the castle to become the only owner of Muri Castle. She bequeathed Muri Castle to her son Armand Heinrich Friedrich von Ernst and her daughter Louise Katharina Henriette, who willed her share of the castle to her brother. In 1938 Alfred Alexander Ludwig Armand von Ernst inherited the castle from his father. In 1980 his daughter, Catherine Stankiewicz-von Ernst, inherited. Today the castle remains privately owned.

== See also ==
- List of castles in Switzerland
