= Robert Charles Hider =

Professor of Medicinal Chemistry at King's College London

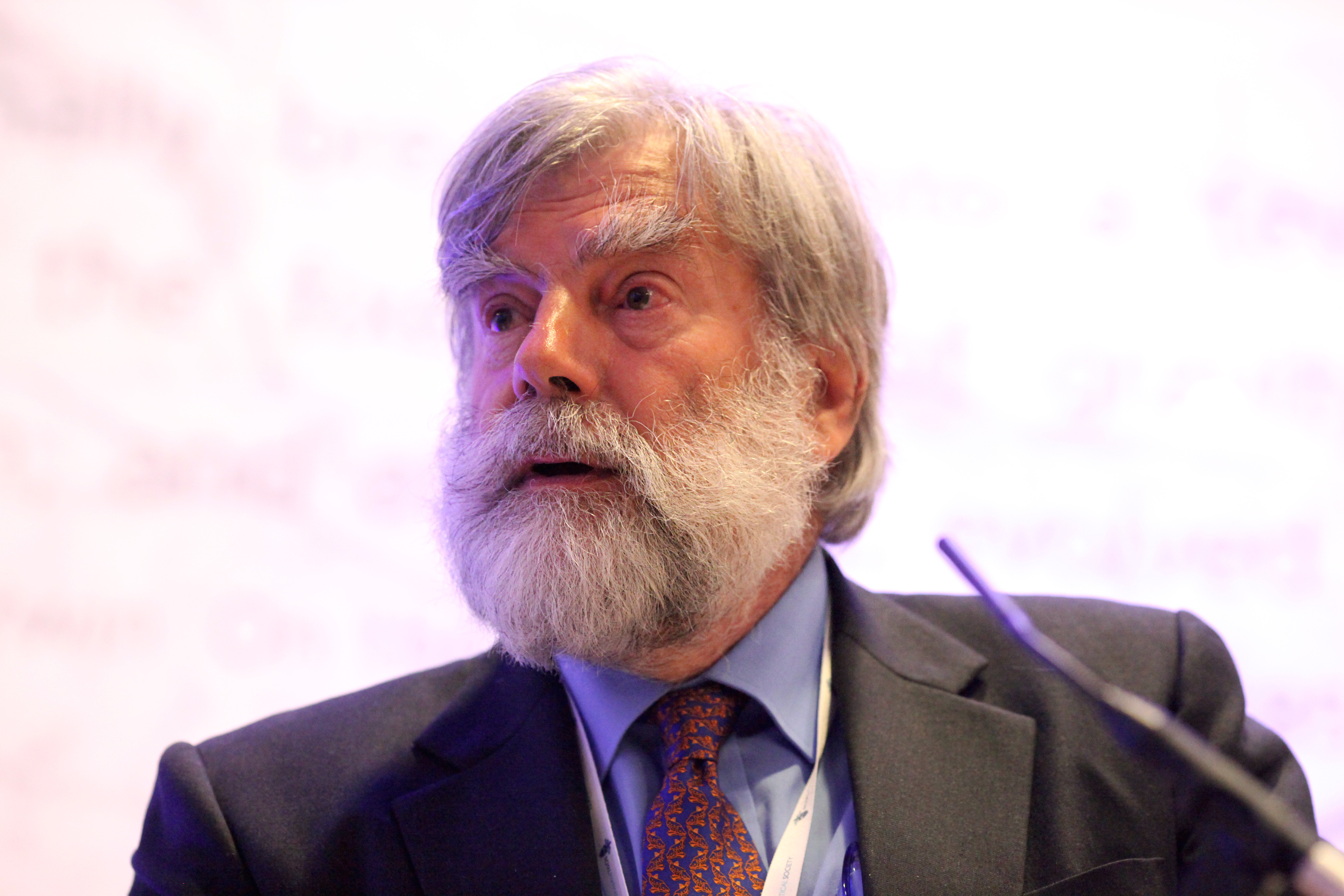
- Hider, 2019
- Born: 1943 (age 82–83); London, UK
- Known for: Therapeutic Iron Chelators

Robert Charles Hider (born 1943, London) is a Professor of Medicinal Chemistry at King's College London. He is a specialist in therapeutic iron chelators.

== Education ==
After education at Winslade School, Exeter, Hider attended King's College London as a BSc chemistry and physics undergraduate (1961–64), and then obtained a Ph.D. there in synthetic chemistry (1967).

== Academic career ==
Holder began a career in biological chemistry in the endocrinology department of St Thomas's Hospital Medical School under the supervision of David London. He studied the influence of insulin on muscle protein synthesis. In 1970 he was appointed as the first lecturer in biological chemistry at Essex University and initiated the biological chemistry degree. During this period his research was directed towards the study of membranes (confirmed by Hayden Williams - former technician to Dr Robert Hider 1980), the mechanisms of penetration of such structures and their mode of interaction with animal toxins. In 1977 he was awarded sabbatical leave and worked with Joe Neilands, in the Department of Biochemistry, the University of California, Berkeley. This laboratory was centred on siderophore chemistry and biochemistry

On return to the UK, Hider in collaboration with Ernest Huehns, developed the first orally active iron chelator, deferiprone, which was introduced into clinical trials by Victor Hoffbrand in 1987. During this decade he was promoted to senior lecturer and then to reader. Deferiprone is currently used worldwide for the treatment of transfusion – induced iron overload, which is associated with β-thalassaemia and sickle cell anaemia.

In 1987 Hider was appointed professor of medicinal chemistry in the pharmacy department of King's College London, where he continued his studies on iron biochemistry. Over the period 1987–2008 he introduced several analytical methods for "non-transferrin bound iron" and continued to develop new iron chelators and particularly those targeted to mitochondria. He collaborated with Ciba Geigy (now Novartis), Apotex, Shire Pharmaceuticals, Vifor, and Renapharma.

During the 1992–2008 period at King's College Hider was, at various times, head of the health science division (1992–1994), head of the School of Life, Basic Medicinal and Health Sciences (1994–2000); head of the department of pharmacy (2000–2003), and head of the School of Biomedical and Health Sciences (2003–2007). In 2008, he retired from teaching and administration duties but continued to maintain an active research laboratory.

== Selected publications ==
His most cited articles are:

- Hider RC, Kong X. Chemistry and biology of siderophores. Natural product reports. 2010;27(5):637-57
- Shayeghi M, Latunde-Dada GO, Oakhill JS, Laftah AH, Takeuchi K, Halliday N, Khan Y, Warley A, McCann FE, Hider RC, Frazer DM. Identification of an intestinal heme transporter. Cell. 2005 Sep 9;122(5):789-801.
- Hider RC. Siderophore mediated absorption of iron. InSiderophores from Microorganisms and Plants 1984 (pp. 25–87). Springer, Berlin, Heidelberg.

== Honours ==
- Fellow of the Royal Society of Chemistry, 1987
- Science chairman of the Royal Pharmaceutical Society of Great Britain, 1998
- Fellow of King's College London, 1999
- Academic lead of department of trade and industry delegation visiting China, 2000
- Hanbury Memorial Medal, 2014;from the Royal Pharmaceutical Society
- Honorary professor at Zhejiang University, Hangzhou, China, 2015–present
- Paul Erlich Award, 2017; from the International Bio-Iron Society
- Honorary professor at the University of Bath, UK, 2019–present

== Personal life ==
Hider married Shirley Nickels in 1967. They have two children and six grandchildren.
