= Holzbrücke Bad Säckingen =

Bridge in Germany and Switzerland

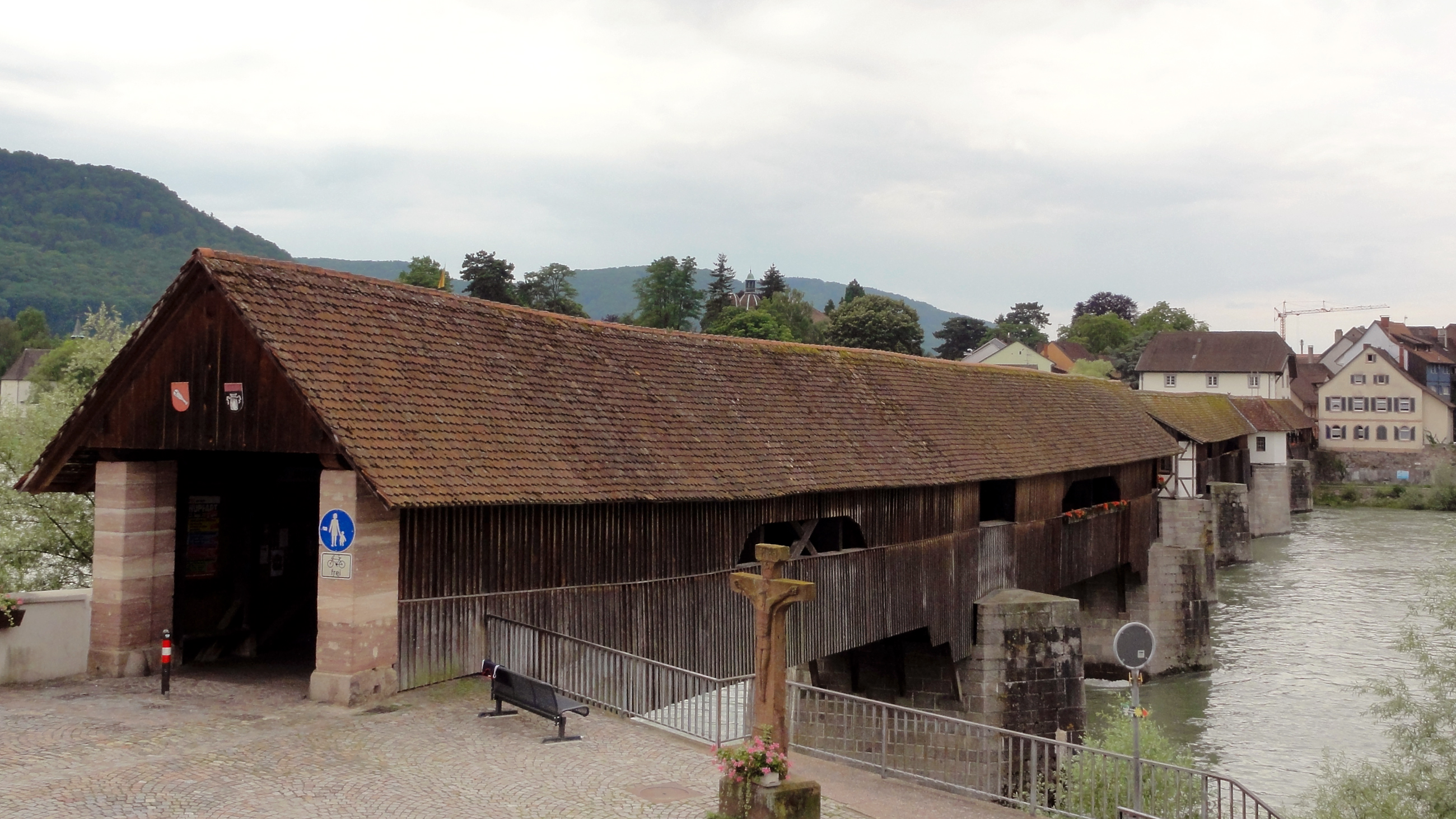
- Holzbrücke Bad Säckingen seen from the Swiss side
- Coordinates: 47°33′05″N 7°57′06″E
- Crosses: Rhine
- Other name: Säckingerbrücke (Swiss name)
- Owner: Stadt Bad Säckingen since 1979 (1869 Grand Duchy of Baden)

Characteristics
- Total length: 203.7 m (668 ft)
- Width: 5 m (16 ft)
- No. of spans: 9

History
- Construction start: mid-13th century
- Opened: 1272
- Inaugurated: 1272

Statistics
- Daily traffic: road, pedestrian (formerly also a road bridge [Reichsstraße Nr. 34 and from 1945 to 1979 Bundesstraße 34])
- Toll: no

Location
- Interactive map of Holzbrücke Bad Säckingen

Holzbrücke Bad Säckingen (German name) or Säckingerbrücke (Swiss name) is a bridge over the Rhine. It connects the German city of Bad Säckingen with the village of Stein in Switzerland. The covered bridge spans 203.7 metres (668 ft) over the Hochrhein and is the longest roofed wooden bridge in Europe. The bridge is listed as a national registered monument in Switzerland (Kulturgut von nationaler Bedeutung im Kanton Aargau).

The bridge was built in 1272 and was destroyed several times (1570, 1633, 1678). The current bridge was completed in 1700. Originally a road bridge, the bridge is now only open for pedestrians since the Fridolinsbrücke (Swiss name: Rheinbrücke Stein) was opened in 1979 for road traffic.

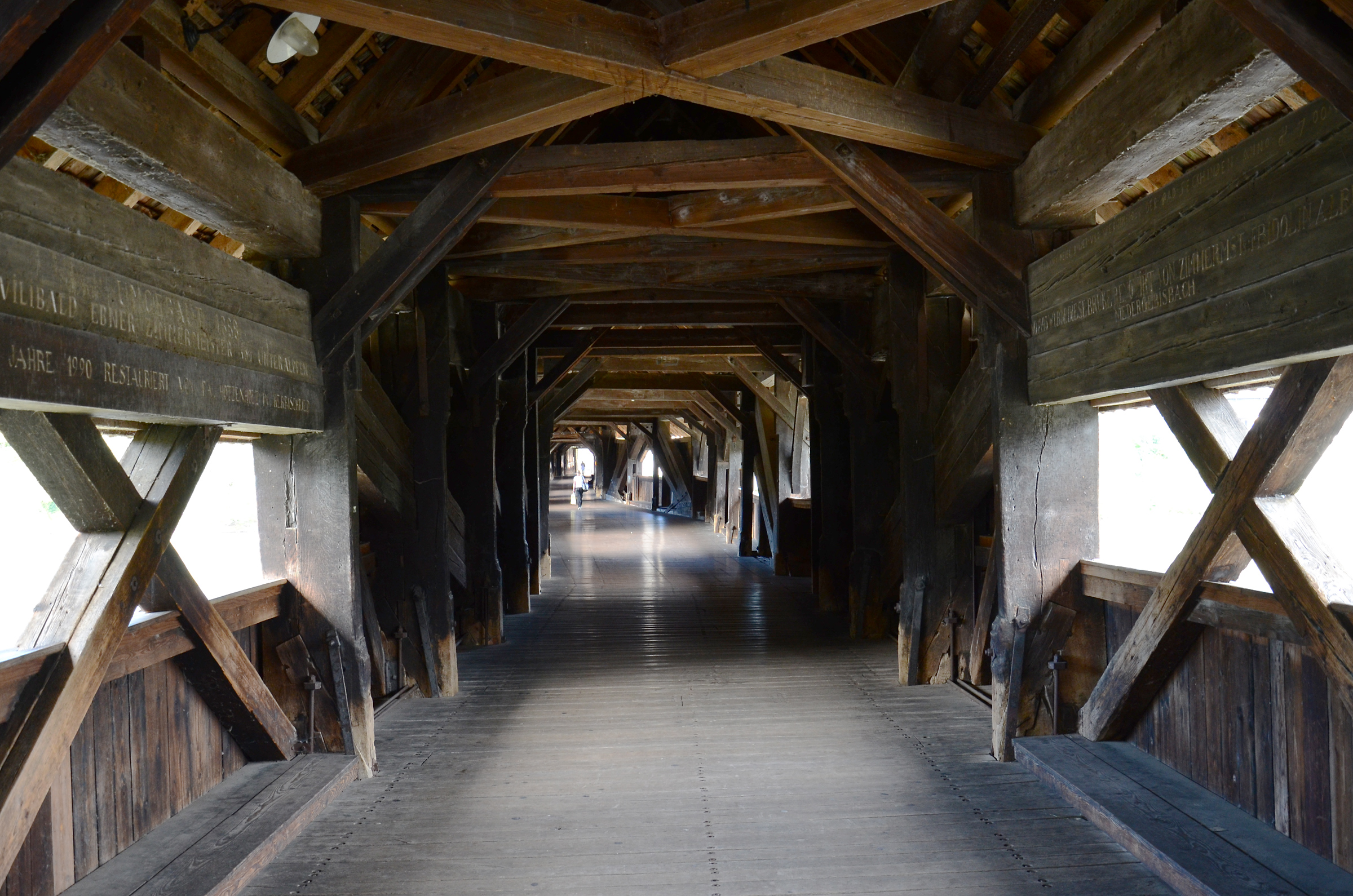
inside

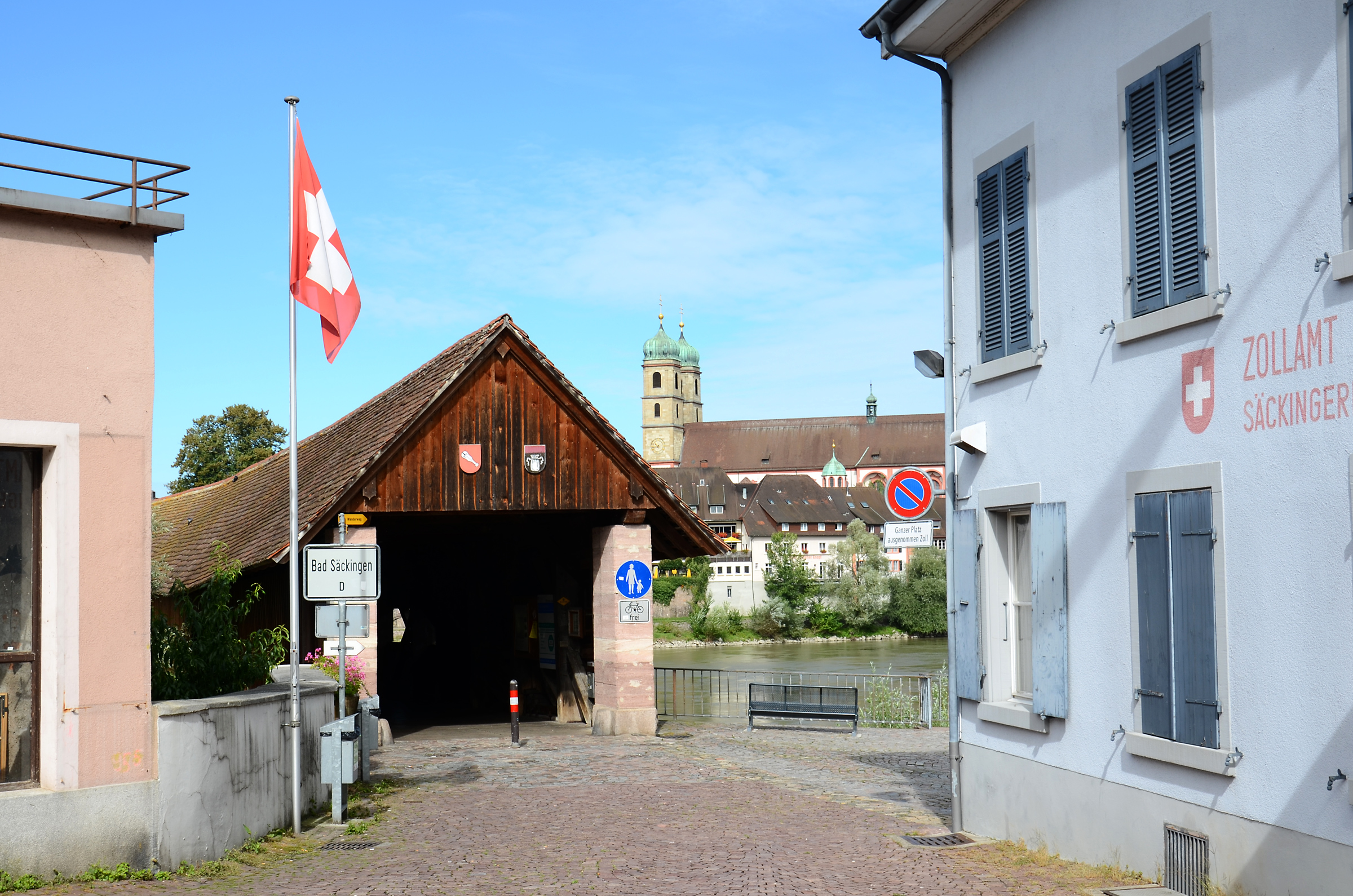
Entrance in Switzerland

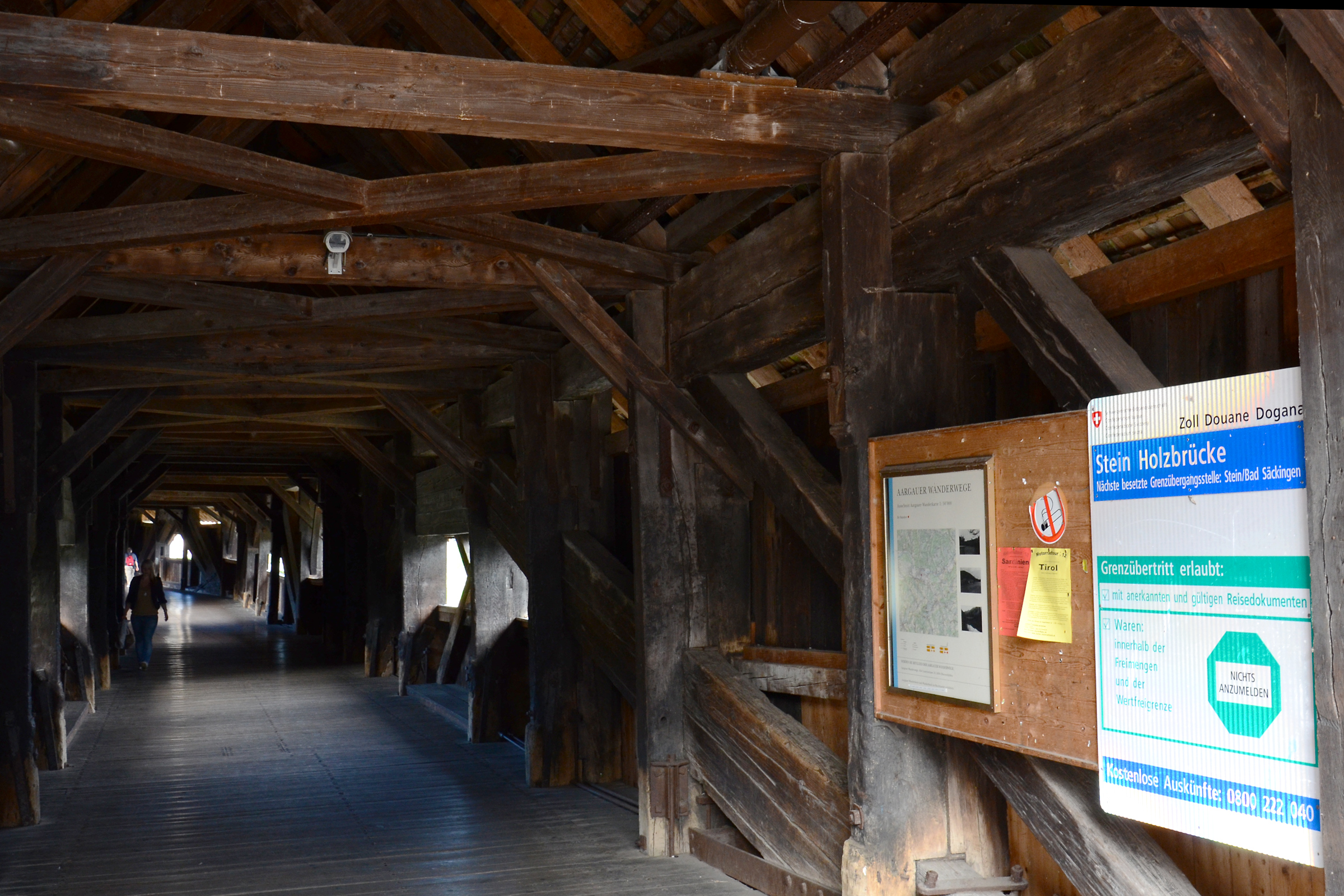
Entrance in Switzerland

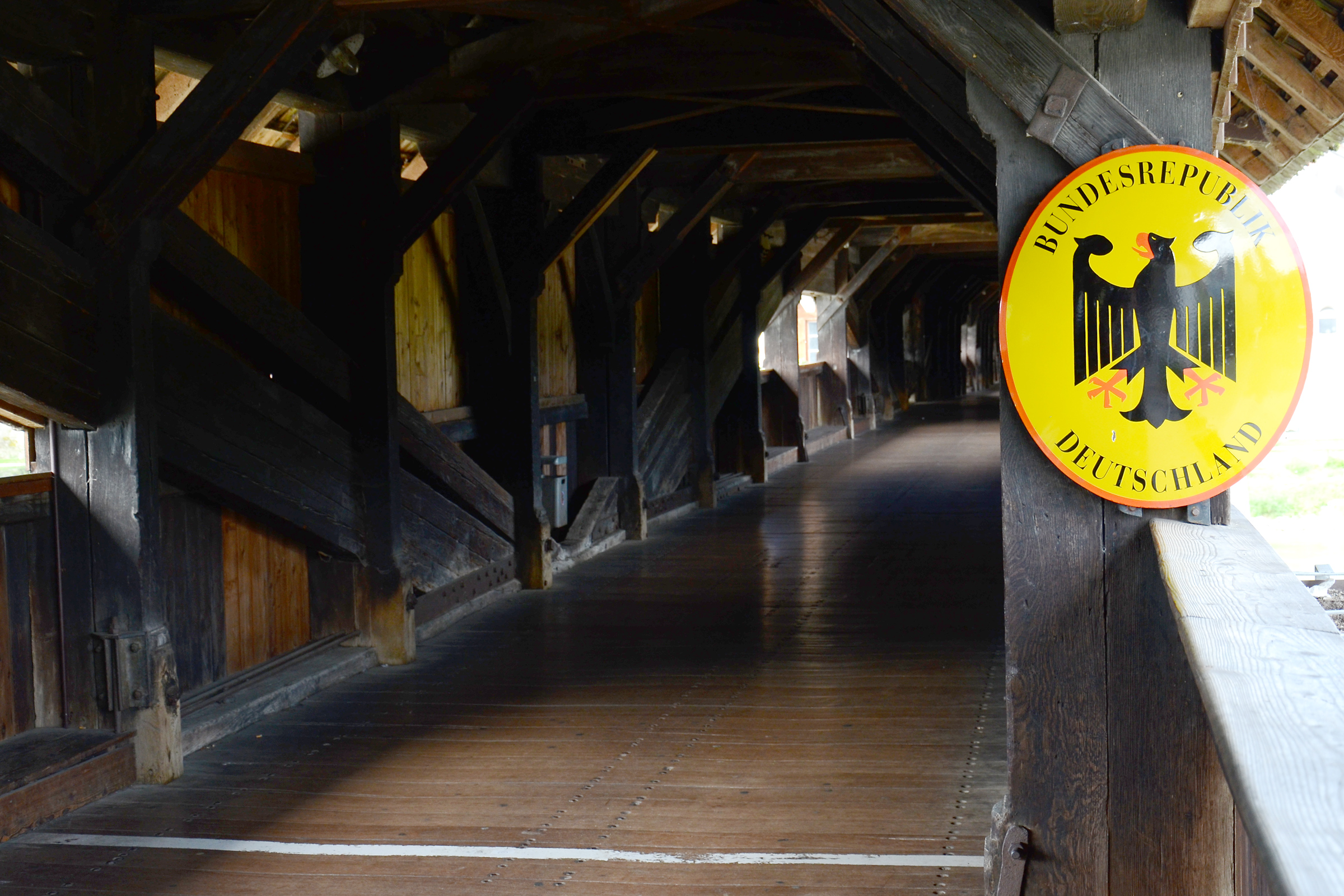
The boundary line in the middle of the Rhine

== See also ==
- List of bridges over the Rhine
- List of bridges in Germany
- List of bridges in Switzerland
- List of international bridges
- Other big wooden bridges in Switzerland
  - Kapellbrücke
  - Auguetbrücke
