= Jonas Fränkel =

Jonas Fränkel or Jonas Fraenkel may refer to:

- Jonah Frankel (businessman) (Joseph Jonas Fränckel, 1773–1846), German banker and philanthropist
- Jonas Fränkel (literary scholar) (1879–1965), Swiss literary scholar
