= Richard Schaefer =

Swiss professional boxing promoter

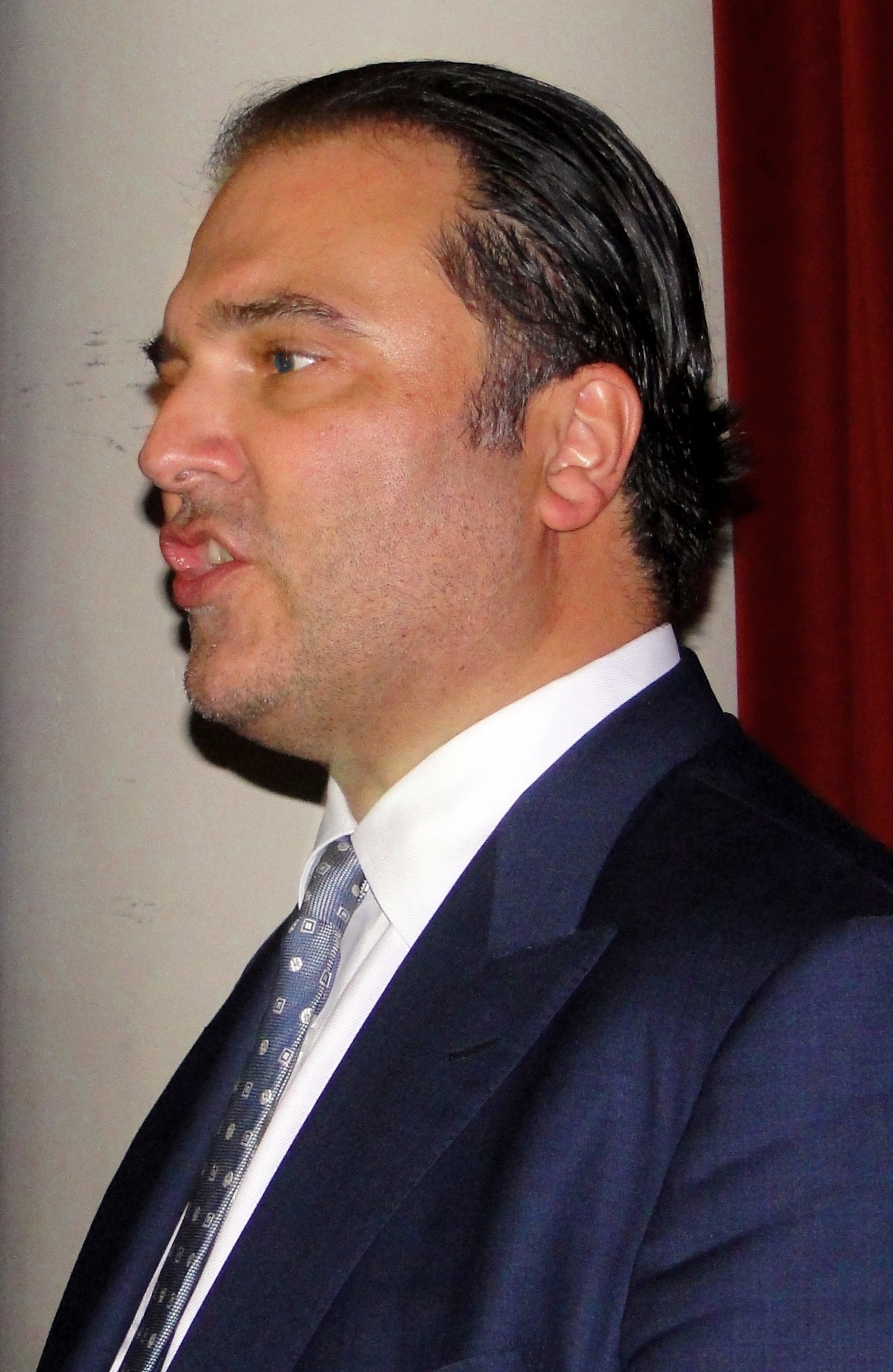
Richard Schaefer at the press conference for the fight between Victor Ortiz and Floyd Mayweather Jr.

Richard Schaefer is a Swiss professional boxing promoter who is the current president of Anthem Sports Group. He was the former CEO of Golden Boy Promotions, which he left in 2014. In 2016 he founded his own boxing promotional company Ringstar Sports.

== Biography ==
Schaefer grew up in Switzerland. He is a Swiss national who began his career in 1983 at Swiss Volksbank (now Credit Suisse). Upon graduation from the Swiss Banking School, a division of the Swiss Finance Institute, he became manager of the Swiss Bank office in Los Angeles in 1994. Two years later, Swiss Bank took over UBS (the largest bank in Switzerland). The surviving entity was UBS. Schaefer was placed in charge of operations for the western United States. In 1997, he was named deputy CEO of all UBS private banking operations in the United States. At the time, UBS oversaw two trillion dollars in assets with private banking at the core.

He stunned his wife and three kids and gave up banking in 2000 to join Oscar De La Hoya's fledgling business organization, to help the young boxer "build up a business empire." Schaefer first focused on the business of managing fighters, but soon switched tracks to the more lucrative event promotion business, lining up deals for several major boxing matches for the past 15 years.

More recently, Schaefer has branched out into real estate. Schaefer has other links to Hispanic culture as well: His wife is from Mexico.

In 2016, Schaefer founded his own boxing promotional company called Ringstar Sports. In January 2017, Ringstar merged with David Haye’s Hayemaker Promotions to form Hayemaker Ringstar. Schaefer announced the World Boxing Super Series in March 2017.

In 2021, Schaefer launched Probellum, a boxing promotion and media company.

In 2023, Schaefer joined Anthem Sports Group, parent company of Invicta Fighting Championships and TNA Wrestling, as its new president.

== See also ==
- Etienne Jornod
- Pierluigi Christophe Orunesu
