= Muri bei Bern =

- Municipality
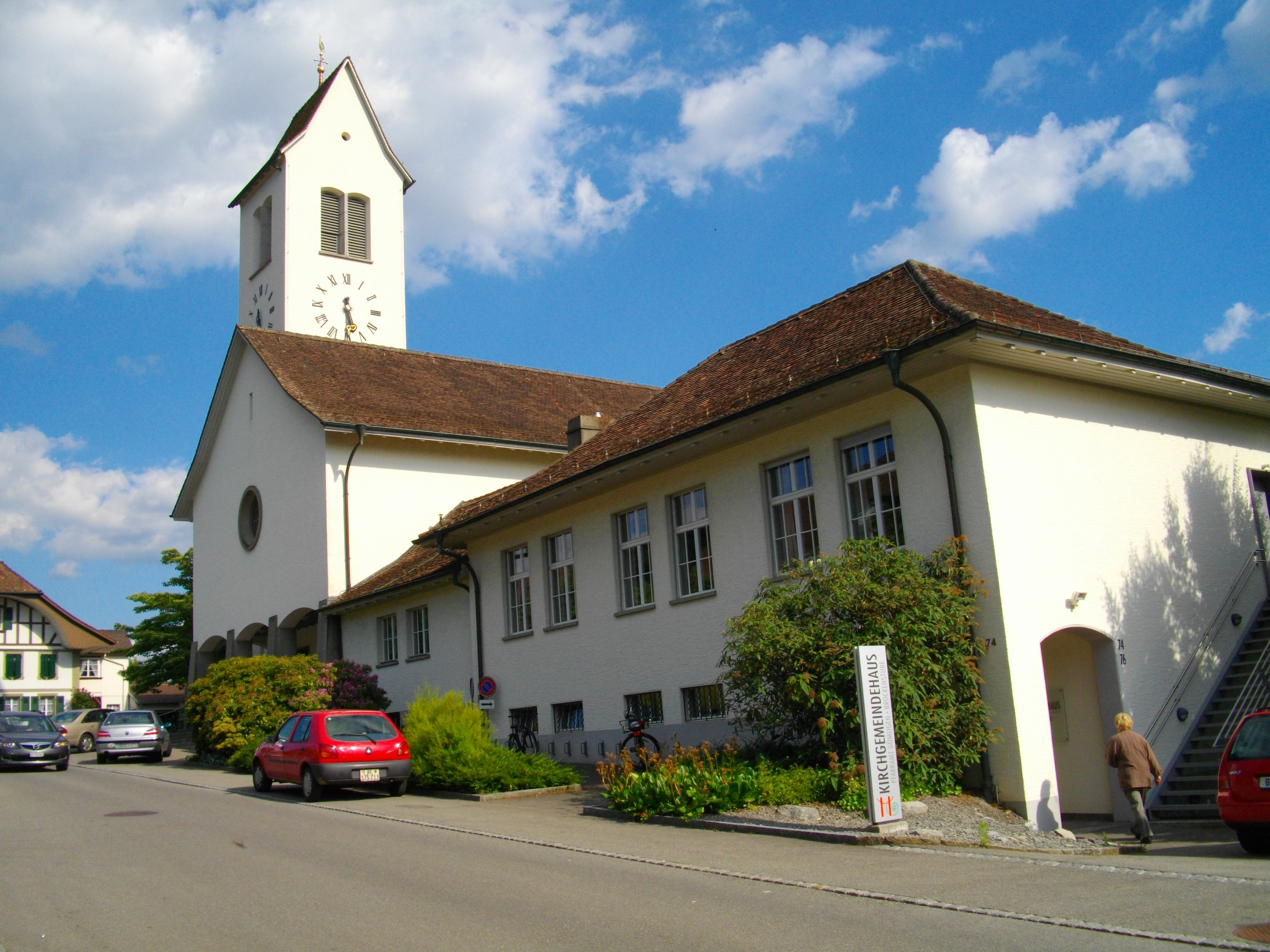

- Flag Coat of arms
- Location of Muri bei Bern
- Location within Switzerland Location within Canton of Bern
- Coordinates: 46°56′N 7°29′E
- Country: Switzerland
- Canton: Bern
- District: Bern-Mittelland

Government
  - Executive: Gemeinderat with 7 members
  - Mayor: Gemeindepräsident; Jan Köbeli SPS/PSS (as of 2026)
  - Parliament: Grosser Gemeinderat with 40 members , instaured January 1973)

Area
  - Total: 7.7 km^{2} (3.0 sq mi)
- Elevation: 558 m (1,831 ft)

Population (December 2020)
  - Total: 13,182
  - Density: 1,700/km^{2} (4,400/sq mi)
- Time zone: UTC+01:00 (CET)
  - Summer (DST): UTC+02:00 (CEST)
- Postal code: 3074
- SFOS number: 356
- ISO 3166 code: CH-BE
- Surrounded by: Allmendingen, Belp, Bern, Kehrsatz, Köniz, Ostermundigen, Stettlen, Vechigen and Worb
- Website: www.muri-guemligen.ch

Muri bei Bern is a municipality in the Bern-Mittelland administrative district in the canton of Bern in Switzerland.

== History ==
Aerial view (1967)

Muri is first mentioned in 1180 as Mure while Gümligen appears in 1239 as Gumelingen or Gumlingin Archaeological finds at Schlosshügel, unearthed in 1832, show that Muri was already settled in the era of the Roman Empire. The earliest documentary evidence for the name was in 1180 when a clergyman named Burkhard made transactions with wealthy residents.

At that time Muri belonged to the dominion of Geristein, which in 1298 was conquered by the city of Bern. The holdings consisted of the four so-called parishes Bolligen, Muri, Stettlen, and Vechigen. As the emerging Bern conquered the territories, it left the municipalities untouched, beginning the long-standing tradition of municipal autonomy.

In the course of the centuries, the residents of the municipality lived in relative stability, in which the major changes in European and Swiss history seemed to pass them by. Major structural and commercial changes began to take place at the beginning of the 20th century. It followed industrialization and the trains from the city to the countryside. In the decade between 1920 and 1930, the municipal population grew from 2435 to 3938, or 62%.

== Geography ==
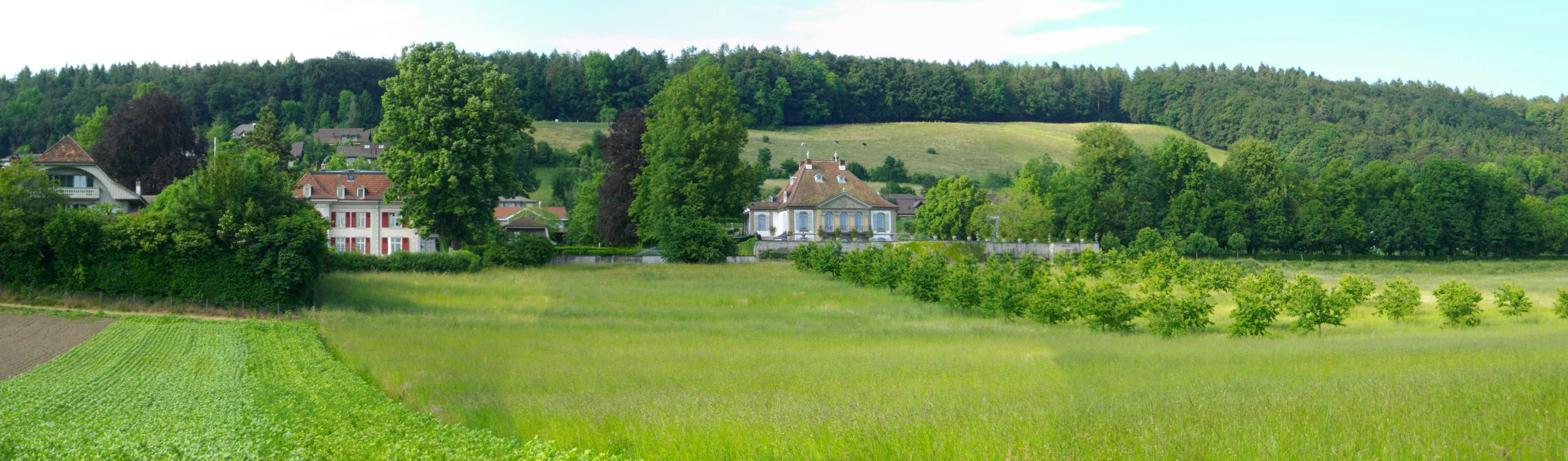
Panorama around Gümligen

Muri bei Bern has an area of 7.63 km^{2} (2.95 sq mi). Of this area, 2 km^{2} (0.77 mi^{2}) or 26.2% is used for agricultural purposes, while 1.67 km^{2} (0.64 mi^{2}) or 21.9% is forested. Of the rest of the land, 3.79 km^{2} (1.46 mi^{2}) or 49.7% is settled (buildings or roads), 0.14 km^{2} (35 acres) or 1.8% is either rivers or lakes and 0.05 km^{2} (12 acres) or 0.7% is unproductive land.

Of the built-up area, industrial buildings made up 3.0% of the total area while housing and buildings made up 32.1% and transportation infrastructure made up 11.7%. while parks, green belts and sports fields made up 2.2%. Out of the forested land, 20.4% of the total land area is heavily forested and 1.4% is covered with orchards or small clusters of trees. Of the agricultural land, 18.2% is used for growing crops and 6.8% is pastures, while 1.2% is used for orchards or vine crops. All the water in the municipality is flowing water.

The highest point is 727 m (2,385 ft) on the Dentenberg Mountain; the lowest point is 508 m (1,667 ft) at the Aare River.

The municipality is located on a terrace above the right bank of the Aare river and is part of the agglomeration of Bern. It consists of the villages of Muri and Gümligen.

On 31 December 2009 Amtsbezirk Bern, the municipality's former district, was dissolved. On the following day, 1 January 2010, it joined the newly created Verwaltungskreis Bern-Mittelland.

== Coat of Arms ==
The blazon of the municipal coat of arms is per pale Sable and Argent, a Fess embattled counterchanged.

== Demographics ==
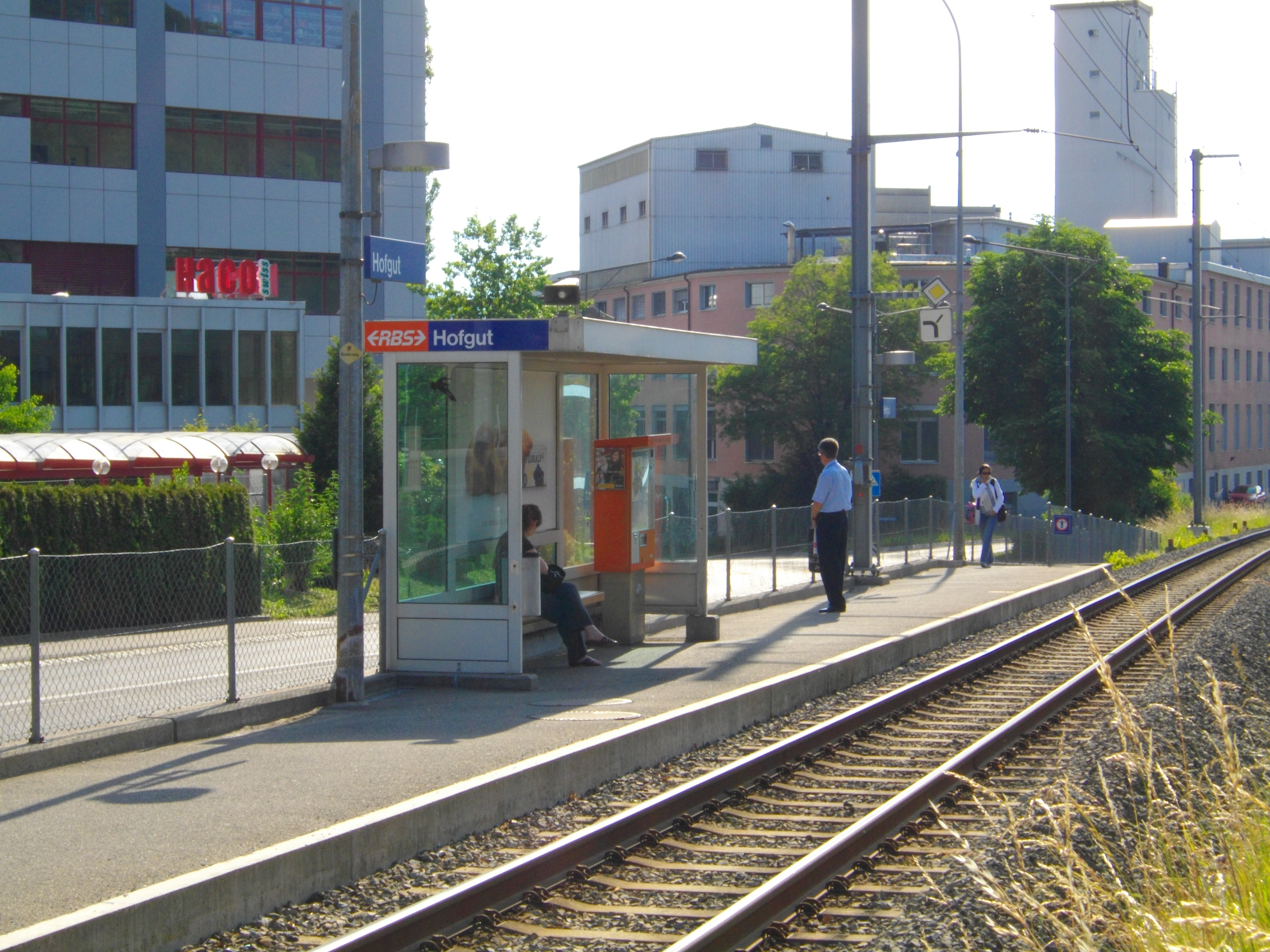
Apartment buildings and offices near the Gümligen Hofgut Tram Station

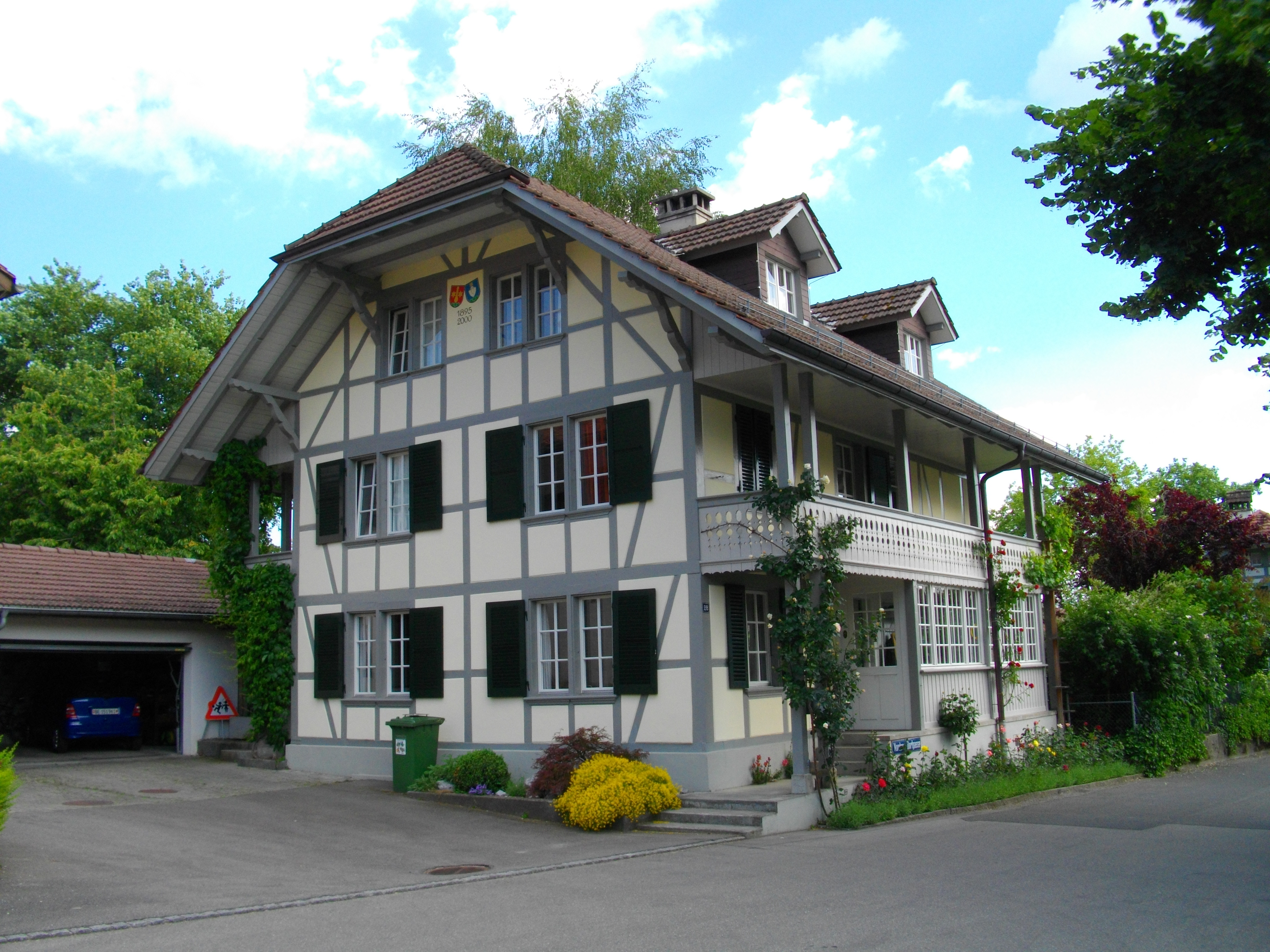
Traditional style house in Gümligen

Muri bei Bern has a population (as of December 2020) of 13,182. As of 2010, 12.4% of the population are resident foreign nationals. Over the last 10 years (2000–2010) the population has changed at a rate of 2.1%. Migration accounted for 5.2%, while births and deaths accounted for -3.4%. Muri also provides a tram service called Bernmobil and a bus service from RBS. Most of the population (as of 2000) speaks German (11,180 or 88.9%) as their first language, French is the second most common (383 or 3.0%) and English is the third (186 or 1.5%). There are 178 people who speak Italian and 8 people who speak Romansh.

As of 2008, the population was 48.3% male and 51.7% female. The population was made up of 5,252 Swiss men (41.6% of the population) and 842 (6.7%) non-Swiss men. There were 5,804 Swiss women (46.0%) and 727 (5.8%) non-Swiss women. Of the population in the municipality, 2,290 or about 18.2% were born in Muri bei Bern and lived there in 2000. There were 5,538 or 44.1% who were born in the same canton, while 2,448 or 19.5% were born somewhere else in Switzerland, and 1,652 or 13.1% were born outside of Switzerland.

As of 2010, children and teenagers (0–19 years old) make up 17.8% of the population, while adults (20–64 years old) make up 56.5% and seniors (over 64 years old) make up 25.7%.

As of 2000, there were 4,612 people who were single and never married in the municipality. There were 6,335 married individuals, 836 widows or widowers and 788 individuals who are divorced.

As of 2000, there were 1,989 households that consist of only one person and 227 households with five or more people. In 2000, a total of 5,427 apartments (93.6% of the total) were permanently occupied, while 268 apartments (4.6%) were seasonally occupied and 103 apartments (1.8%) were empty. As of 2010, the construction rate of new housing units was 0.2 new units per 1000 residents. The vacancy rate for the municipality, in 2011, was 0.19%.

The historical population is given in the following chart:

== Heritage sites of national significance ==
The Hofgut and Gümligen Castle are listed as Swiss heritage site of national significance.

=== Notable sights and recreation ===
- Aarebad Muri, popular site for swimming
- Muri Castle (privately owned)
- Gümligen Castle (privately owned)
- Hofgut, a country estate
- Villa Mettlen, country estate
- Muri Church, a Swiss Reformed Church
- Auguetbrücke, bridge across the Aare finished in 1836.
- Natural Protected Area along the Aare
- Between Belp and Köniz there are still ferries between Bern and Thun along the Aare
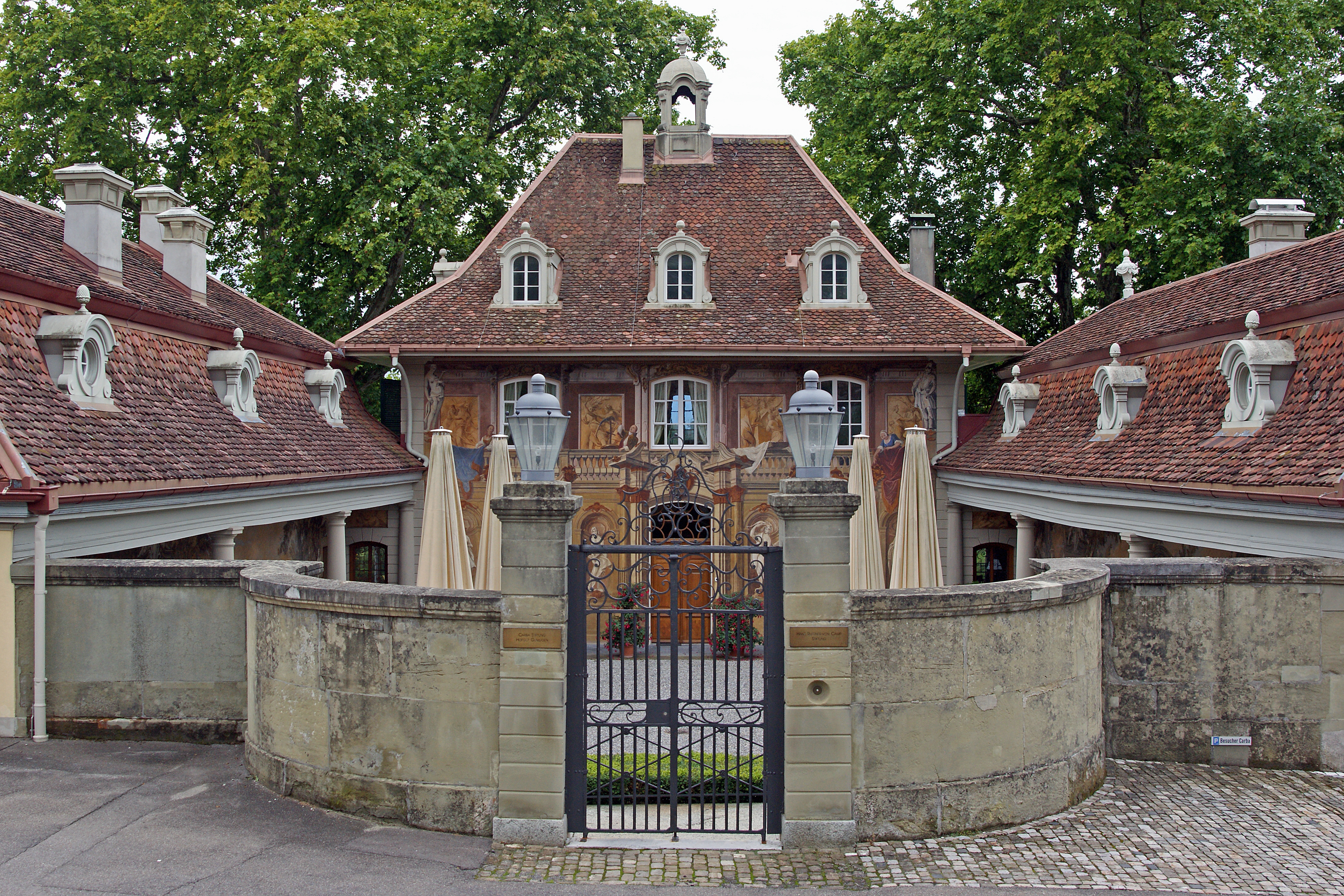
Hofgut Castle

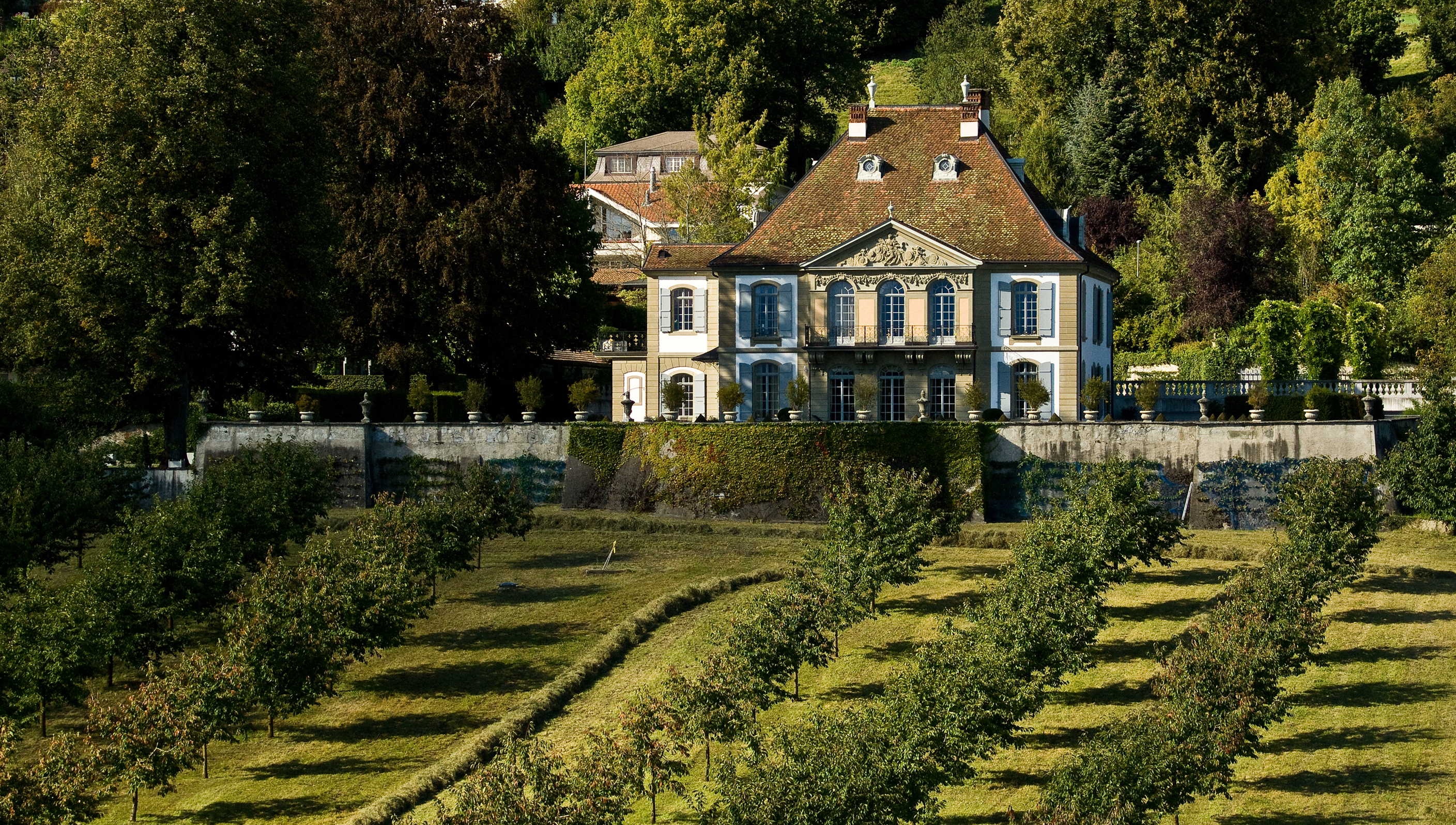
Gümligen Castle

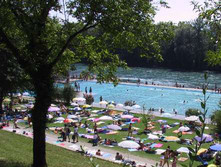
Aarebad Muri swimming pool

== Religion ==
From the 2000 census, 2,065 or 16.4% were Roman Catholic, while 7,826 or 62.3% belonged to the Swiss Reformed Church. Of the rest of the population, there were 71 members of an Orthodox church (or about 0.56% of the population), there were 20 individuals (or about 0.16% of the population) who belonged to the Christian Catholic Church, and there were 696 individuals (or about 5.54% of the population) who belonged to another Christian church. There were 33 individuals (or about 0.26% of the population) who were Jewish, and 197 (or about 1.57% of the population) who were Islamic. There were 41 individuals who were Buddhist, 68 individuals who were Hindu and 25 individuals who belonged to another church. 1,323 (or about 10.52% of the population) belonged to no church, are agnostic or atheist, and 533 individuals (or about 4.24% of the population) did not answer the question.

== Politics ==
The greater municipal council is the legislature of the municipality. It has 40 members, elected every four years by proportional representation.

The municipal council is the executive. It has seven members. With the exception of the mayor, the other members keep other jobs. The council is chosen every four years at the same time and in the same manner as the greater council. The mayor is chosen by majority.

In the 2011 federal election the most popular party was the FDP which received 20.7% of the vote. The next three most popular parties were the SPS (19.7%), the SVP (19.1%) and the BDP Party (14.1%). In the federal election, a total of 5,799 votes were cast, and the voter turnout was 60.9%.

== Economy ==
In January 2003 the trade and industry association of the canton of Bern ranked 51 major municipalities in the Bern metropolitan area and Biel-Seeland region according to favourable economic practices. Muri led the list, followed by Lyss and Belp. Muri is known as a tax haven within the canton.

Space for new enterprises is being made available with authorized construction plans. The areas designated Gümligen Station and Gümligen Field are currently centres of development within the canton.

As of 2011, Muri bei Bern had an unemployment rate of 1.48%. As of 2008, there were a total of 7,656 people employed in the municipality. Of these, there were 25 people employed in the primary economic sector and about 7 businesses involved in this sector. 1,724 people were employed in the secondary sector and there were 109 businesses in this sector. 5,907 people were employed in the tertiary sector, with 597 businesses in this sector.

In 2008 there were a total of 6,520 full-time equivalent jobs. The number of jobs in the primary sector was 21, all of which were in agriculture. The number of jobs in the secondary sector was 1,639 of which 850 or (51.9%) were in manufacturing and 757 (46.2%) were in construction. The number of jobs in the tertiary sector was 4,860. In the tertiary sector; 767 or 15.8% were in wholesale or retail sales or the repair of motor vehicles, 155 or 3.2% were in the movement and storage of goods, 131 or 2.7% were in a hotel or restaurant, 501 or 10.3% were in the information industry, 766 or 15.8% were the insurance or financial industry, 808 or 16.6% were technical professionals or scientists, 247 or 5.1% were in education and 783 or 16.1% were in health care.

In 2000, there were 4,999 workers who commuted into the municipality and 4,717 workers who commuted away. The municipality is a net importer of workers, with about 1.1 workers entering the municipality for every one leaving. Of the working population, 35.8% used public transportation to get to work, and 41.9% use private car.

== Education ==
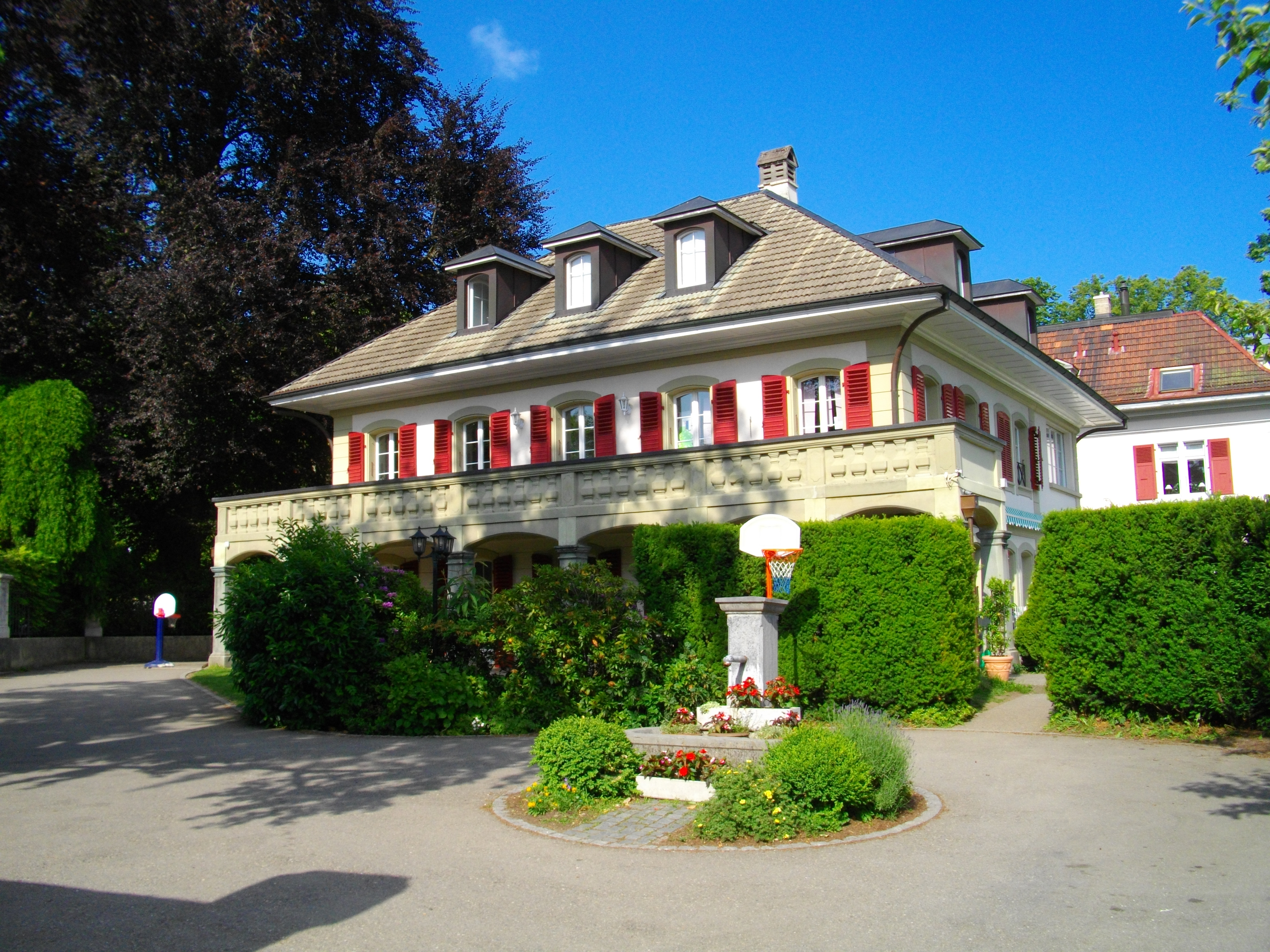
British School Bern in Gümligen

The municipality has six public primary schools.It is also home to the International School of Berne, a private English-language school located in Gümligen. Early childhood care includes four daycare centers (Kindertagesstätten or Kitas): three in Gümligen and one in Muri.

In Muri bei Bern about 5,128 or (40.8%) of the population have completed non-mandatory upper secondary education, and 3,100 or (24.7%) have completed additional higher education (either university or a Fachhochschule). Of the 3,100 who completed tertiary schooling, 65.3% were Swiss men, 26.8% were Swiss women, 4.8% were non-Swiss men and 3.1% were non-Swiss women.

The Canton of Bern school system provides one year of non-obligatory Kindergarten, followed by six years of Primary school. This is followed by three years of obligatory lower Secondary school where the students are separated according to ability and aptitude. Following the lower Secondary students may attend additional schooling or they may enter an apprenticeship.

During the 2009–10 school year, there were a total of 1,218 students attending classes in Muri bei Bern. There were 9 kindergarten classes with a total of 176 students in the municipality. Of the kindergarten students, 7.4% were permanent or temporary residents of Switzerland (not citizens) and 16.5% have a different mother language than the classroom language. The municipality had 30 primary classes and 602 students. Of the primary students, 13.1% were permanent or temporary residents of Switzerland (not citizens) and 18.8% have a different mother language than the classroom language. During the same year, there were 15 lower secondary classes with a total of 289 students. There were 11.4% who were permanent or temporary residents of Switzerland (not citizens) and 16.6% have a different mother language than the classroom language.

As of 2000, there were 226 students in Muri bei Bern who came from another municipality, while 605 residents attended schools outside the municipality.

== Notable residents ==
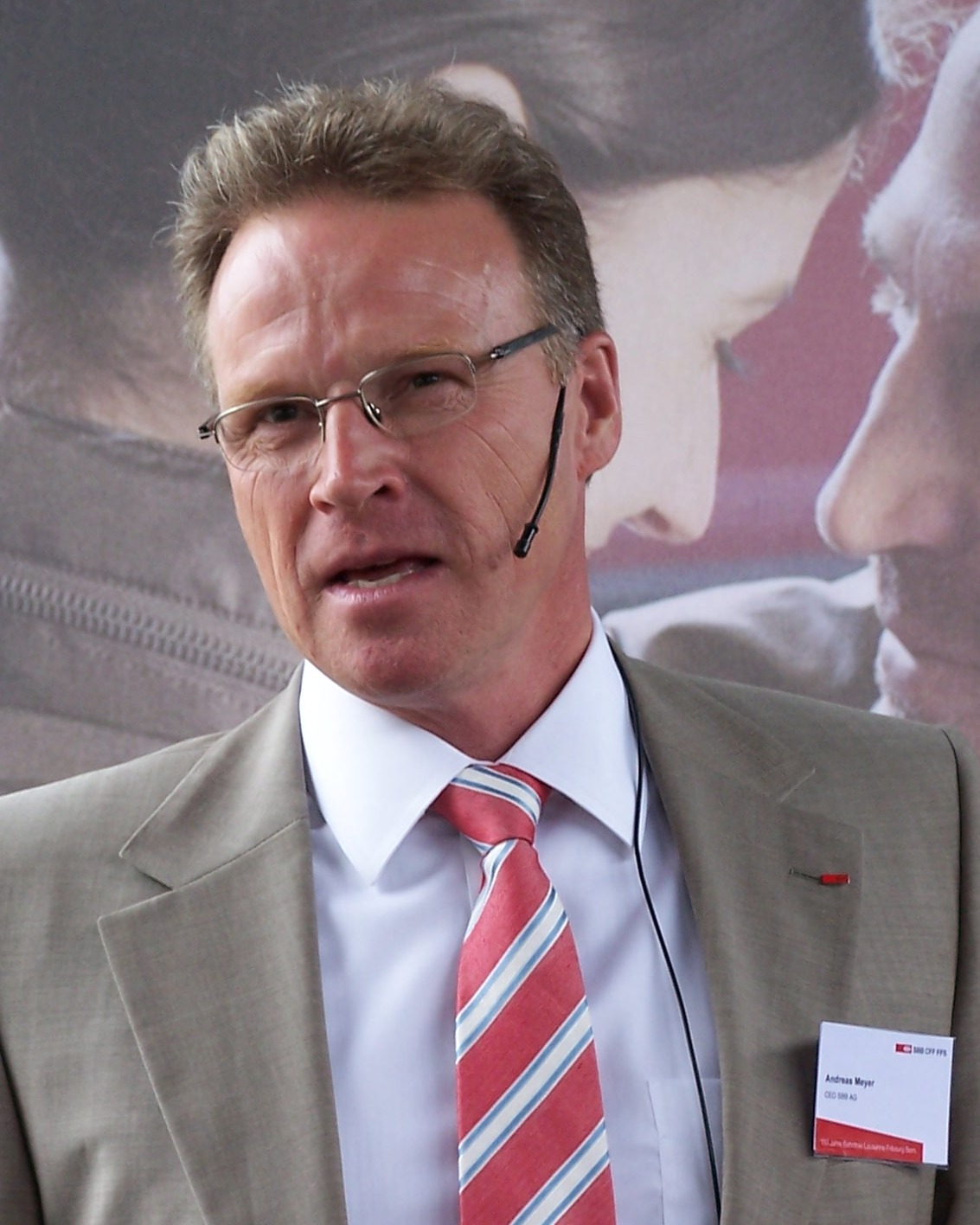
Andreas Meyer, 2012

- Rudolf Maria Holzapfel (1874 – 1930 in Muri) a Poland-born Austrian psychologist and philosopher; nominated for the Nobel Prize in Literature six times
- Marthe Gosteli (1917 – 2017 in Muri) a Swiss suffrage activist and archivist
- Etienne Jornod (born 1953) a Swiss entrepreneur, chairman of the Board of Directors of the pharmaceutical and logistics group Galenica and the NZZ Mediengruppe, he lives in Muri bei Bern
- Andreas Meyer (born 1961) lawyer and since 2007 Chairman of the management board of the Swiss Federal Railways (SBB), he lives in Muri bei Bern
- Joëlle Brupbacher (1978–2011) a Swiss mountaineer, she lived in Muri bei Bern
