= Vifor =

Vifor may refer to:

- Vifor-class destroyer, a class of Romanian destroyers
- CSL Vifor, a pharmaceuticals company
- Italian cruiser Aquila, an Italian scout cruiser originally laid down as the Romanian destroyer Vifor
