= Designboom =

Web magazine for industrial design

- Screenshot of the website in December 2024
- Available in: English
- Owner: NZZ Mediengruppe
- Creators: Birgit Lohmann; Massimo Mini
- Editor: Sofia Lekka Angelopoulou (since 2023)
- Website: www.designboom.com
- Commercial: Yes
- Launched: 1999; 27 years ago

Designboom is a daily web magazine headquartered in Milan and covering the fields of industrial design, architecture, and art internationally.

== History ==
Launched in 1999, the publication was the first web magazine to focus on industrial design, architecture, and art internationally.

In 2010, Designboom China was launched. In 2012, Designboom and Architonic formed a strategic alliance to pool their digital resources. In 2017, Designboom launched The Design Prize with the Italian magazine Abitare awarding top designers in ten categories. In January 2022, Designboom was acquired by the Architonic/ArchDaily group (owned by the Swiss media group NZZ). In February 2023, Sofia Lekka Angelopoulou replaced Birgit Lohmann as editor-in-chief of Designboom.

== Description ==
Designboom features interviews and firsthand studio visits with designers and architects, in addition to coverage of international design fairs and new projects. Newsletters are published daily.

Designboom runs several international design competitions each year, in partnership with large companies. In addition, Designboom hosts young designers "marts" at a range of furniture and design fairs, an exhibition format that it introduced in 2005 at the International Contemporary Furniture Fair in New York City, and which has since become an industry standard.

In 2012, Designboom itself became a subject of media attention for its defense of Takeshi Miyakawa when the artist was arrested and held on Riker's Island for a controversial street installation in New York City. Miyakawa was collaborating with Designboom on a lighting installation for the International Contemporary Furniture Fair at the time.

== Awards ==
- 2007: The Style & Design 100 in the "blogwatch" category by Time magazine
