= 24/7 Media =

Technology company

- Type: WPP
- Industry: Digital marketing
- Founded: 1995
- Headquarters: New York City, New York, United States
- Key people: David J. Moore (chairman and CEO); Nicolle Pangis (president, Real Media Group); Oleg Vishnepolsky (CTO); Jim Wesley (chief financial officer)
- Products: 24/7 Open AdStream; 24/7 Connect; 24/7 Data Management Platform; 24/7 Search; 24/7 Self-Serve

24/7 Media, formerly 24/7 Real Media is a technology company headquartered in New York City and 20 offices in 12 countries, specializing in Digital Marketing. It provides for publishers, advertisers and agencies globally. It was formerly listed as "TFSM" on the NASDAQ stock exchange. The company was purchased by WPP plc in 2007 for $649 million. David J. Moore is the chairman, founder and CEO. He also served as chairman of the Interactive Advertising Bureau. In December, 2013, 24/7 Media announced it would merge with GroupM subsidiary, Xaxis.

== History ==
The original name of the company was 24/7 Media which was a result of a unification of Petry Interactive, Interactive Imaginations and Advercomm, Inc. It had a stock market launch in August 1998 following which it went through a period of rapid expansion through organic growth and series of acquisitions.

A very difficult situation arose in the wake of the tech bubble burst of 2001. As a result, 24/7 Media merged with a company called Real Media and changed its name to 24/7 Real Media. As part of this merger it acquired an advertising technology platform called Open AdStream. According to a video recording of the CEO produced 9 years later, it was able to capitalize on a mistake by DoubleClick. DoubleClick had agreed to buy Real Media for 11 million dollars. DoubleClick tried to change the offer to 10M at the last moment. Thus, the sellers – a Swiss company PubliGroupe – gave 24/7 Media an opportunity to acquire Real Media for no-cash 2 million dollar of stock swap. This acquisition came at the right time as 24/7 Media's stock was trading at 10 cents. The Real Media acquisition brought intellectual property, Open Adstream, additional revenues and clients. Incidentally, because of the 24/7 Media stock appreciation in subsequent years, PubliGroupe received in payments a total of over 25 million dollars by 2007, instead of DoubleClick's $10M.

The turnaround started shortly thereafter according to the stock price. In July 2002 the company raised 7 million dollars in equity funding. In 2003 24/7 Media licensed its patents on behavioral targeting to 6 of its rivals, DoubleClick included. In January 2003 24/7 bought a web analytics company Insight First. In 2004 24/7 Media acquired an SEM technology company Decide Interactive. In 2006 Open AdStream and Insight First analytics were integrated.

24/7 Media was acquired in 2007 by WPP at $11.75 a share, a turnaround from the low of 39 cents a share in 2003. Journal The Economist reported that WPP acquisition of 24/7 Media was a reaction to Google acquiring 24/7's main rival DoubleClick. Microsoft was a contender to buy 24/7 Media at the time. A year later in 2008 Microsoft was still interested.

24/7 Media is in digital marketing technology, serving advertisers, agencies and digital publishers worldwide. The 24/7 technology platform is used by its two specialized business units: Real Media Group (ad network and ad serving) and Media Innovation Group (digital marketing agency).

== Products ==
According to various press releases, SEC filings and the company website 24/7 Media has the following product set:

- A data management platform called the 24/7 DMP (formerly known as ZAP)
- DSP called 24/7 Trader
- SEM optimization product called 24/7 search
- Media and affiliate networks in North America, UK, France and Korea, called 24/7 Access
