= Jonas Fränkel (literary scholar) =

Swiss literary scholar (1879–1965)

- Born: 12 August 1879; Kraków, Austria-Hungary
- Died: 4 June 1965 (aged 85); Brig, Switzerland
- Education: University of Bern
- Occupations: Literary scholar; publicist
- Employer: University of Bern
- Spouse: Erika Wilisch (m. 1920)
- Children: 3
- Parents: Eleazar Fränkel (father); Rebecca Pitzele (mother)

Jonas Fränkel (12 August 1879 – 4 June 1965) was a Swiss literary scholar and publicist of Polish origin, born in Kraków. He taught modern German literature at the University of Bern from 1909 to 1949. A friend and collaborator of the writer Carl Spitteler, he helped him obtain the Nobel Prize in Literature, and Spitteler intended him to edit his works and write his biography. Fränkel also prepared a critical edition of the works of Gottfried Keller. He was pushed out of both projects. As a Jewish immigrant, he was exposed to public discrediting from the 1930s onwards.

== Biography ==
Jonas Fränkel was born on 12 August 1879 in Kraków, the fourth of eight children of the merchant Eleazar Fränkel and Rebecca née Pitzele. The family was Jewish and lived in modest circumstances. He was Polish and became a citizen of Bern in 1919.

Fränkel, who had been hard of hearing since childhood, began studying German studies in Vienna in 1897. From 1899 he continued his studies at the University of Bern, which he completed in 1902 with a dissertation on Zacharias Werner's technique of drama. After a long stay in Berlin from 1904 to 1908 and various journalistic and editorial work, he obtained the right to teach (Lehrberechtigung) modern German literary history at the University of Bern in 1909. He taught there as a Privatdozent until 1921 and then, until his retirement in 1949, as associate professor (ausserordentlicher Professor) of modern German literature and comparative literary history.

In 1920 Fränkel married Erika Wilisch, the daughter of a wealthy German family. The couple had three children and lived in a house belonging to the Wilisch family in Hünibach (Hilterfingen).

=== Spitteler's papers ===
From 1908 Fränkel was a friend of the writer Carl Spitteler. Their friendship went together with intensive collaboration and is documented in over 1,000 letters. Not least, Fränkel used his international contacts, for example with Romain Rolland, successfully to ensure that Spitteler received the Nobel Prize in Literature in 1920, retroactively for 1919. Spitteler in turn intended his friend to be the administrator of his literary estate, the editor of his collected works and the author of his biography, but without stating this in his will. For this purpose he gave him extensive material such as manuscripts of his works, illustrated autobiographical notes and various private correspondence.

Spitteler's daughters had fallen out with Fränkel after their father's death in 1924, and in 1932 they gave the rest of his literary estate to the Swiss National Library (Schweizerische Landesbibliothek). Various people from the heirs' circle and Federal Councillor Philipp Etter then put heavy but unsuccessful pressure on Fränkel to hand over the Spitteler documents in his possession to the Confederation as well. After lengthy disputes he was denied access to the papers in the National Library, which blocked his work on Spitteler's biography.

=== Keller edition ===
Fränkel was also pushed out of the second core area of his work. In 1926, after he had published critical essays on earlier research and editions of the works of Gottfried Keller, the government of the canton of Zurich had granted him subsidies for a critical edition of Keller's works based on his years of preparatory work. By 1939 Fränkel had prepared, with great effort, 17 of the 22 planned volumes for printing. In 1941, however, after legal disputes with the publisher over delays in publication, the canton of Zurich denied him further work on the edition. In the background was also the sharp criticism of Nazism that Fränkel had made in his book Gottfried Kellers politische Sendung (Gottfried Keller's political mission, 1939), which made his publishers fear for their sales on the German market.

=== Defamation and recognition ===
The disputes over Spitteler's papers and the edition were accompanied by extensive statements in the press and in politics that attacked Fränkel's integrity and were often latently or explicitly antisemitic. Among other things, his Keller edition was disparaged in 1942 as a translation "into Hebrew". To the end of his life Fränkel fought for his rights and his reputation and defended himself forcefully in polemics such as Spittelers Recht (Spitteler's right, 1946). He documented the history of his marginalization and continued his journalistic and scholarly work as far as possible.

Only from the 1950s did Fränkel's work find some recognition. In 1950 the education department (Erziehungsdirektion) of the canton of Bern awarded him an honorary prize, and in 1964 he was made an honorary doctor of the University of Jena and a fellow of the Leo Baeck Institute in New York. His great life projects, including the Spitteler biography, remained unfinished when he died in Brig (Note: Sources disagree: the HDS says he died in Brig, on his way home from Italy, while his GND authority record gives Thun.) on 4 June 1965, on his way home from Italy.

In 2021 his papers were transferred to the Swiss Literary Archives. The long history of the transfer is due to the wrongs that official Switzerland committed against Fränkel and his family. While the collection was being cataloged at the Literary Archives, a research project funded by the Swiss National Science Foundation began to study the Fränkel case comprehensively (2023–2027).

== Works ==
- "Die Gottfried-Keller-Ausgaben. Ein Kapitel neuester Philologie", in Euphorion, 29, 1928, 138–174
- Gottfried Kellers politische Sendung, 1939
- Spittelers Recht. Dokumente eines Kampfes, 1946

== Bibliography ==
- Charles Linsmayer, "'Ein Jude uns unsere grossen Dichter vermitteln! Merci vielmals!' Anmerkungen zur Spitteler-Rezeption und zum Fall Fränkel", in Quarto, 4/5, 1995, 162–168
- Julian Schütt, Germanistik und Politik. Schweizer Literaturwissenschaft in der Zeit des Nationalsozialismus, 1996, 177–204
- Ursula Amrein (ed.), Gottfried Keller-Handbuch. Leben – Werk – Wirkung, 2nd edition, 2018 (first edition 2016), 343–346
- Journal B, 15, 17 and 19 October 2019
- Republik, 15 July 2021
- Irmgard M. Wirtz, "Wie Jonas Fränkels Nachlass mit dem Krypto-Nachlass Spitteler nach einem halben Jahrhundert ins Schweizerische Literaturarchiv fand", in Passim, 27, 2021, 22–23
- Joanna Nowotny, "Wie Jonas Fränkel seine Heimat verlor", in NZZ Geschichte, 39, 2022, 82–91
- SNSF project "Jonas Fränkels Kryptophilologie" (with a list of publications)

=== Archives ===
- Swiss Literary Archives, Bern: papers of Jonas Fränkel (Nachlass)
