= Joëlle Brupbacher =

Swiss mountain climber (1978–2011)

- Born: August 3, 1978
- Died: May 22, 2011; Makalu
- Cause of death: Altitude sickness, exhaustion
- Burial place: Makalu
- Occupation: IT Specialist
- Known for: First Swiss woman to summit five eight-thousanders
- Spouse(s): Jorge Egocheaga (Spanish summiteer of all 14 eight-thousanders), 2011

Joëlle Catherine Brupbacher (3 August 1978 – 22 May 2011) was a Swiss mountaineer.

Brupbacher lived in Muri bei Bern and was employed as an IT specialist with Swiss Federal Railways. Before she turned to mountaineering, she was a sport climber. She would go on to be the first Swiss woman to climb five of the fourteen eight-thousanders, without using supplementary oxygen.

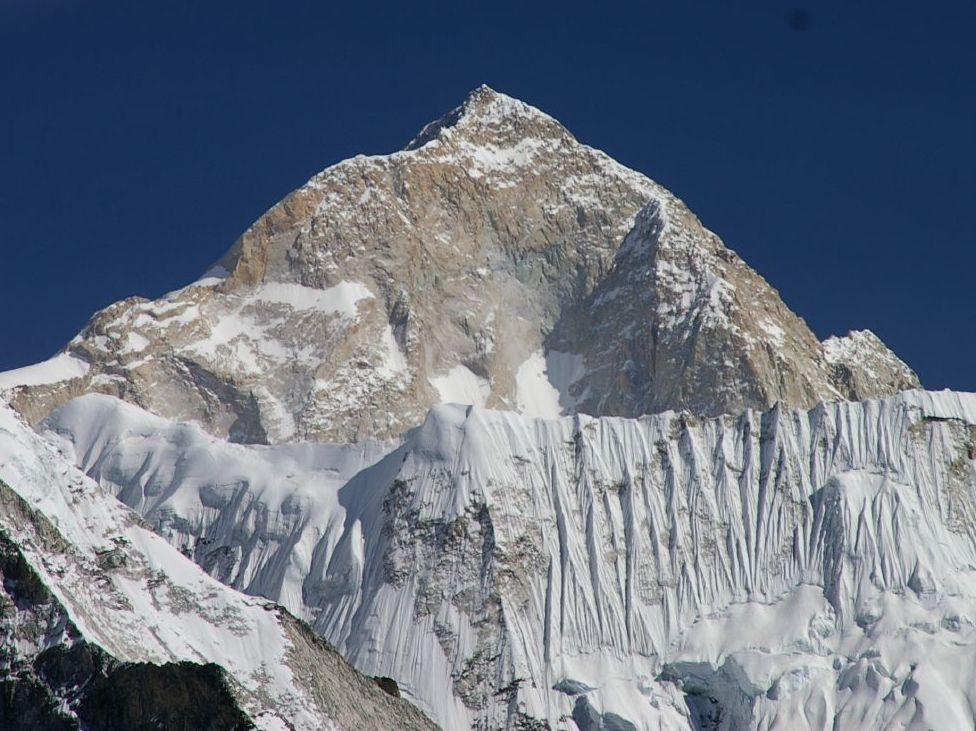
Makalu, the destination for the final climb

== Final climb ==
Brupbacher was climbing Makalu with a small expedition team on the mountain that day, including her husband, Jorge Egocheaga and Oscar Fernandez. Brupabacher and Egocheaga were married only a month before the climb. It was her second attempt at Makalu, after an attempt in the previous season that was aborted at 7800m. Brupacher was climbing with a cold, and making slower progress than the others. Egocheaga summited first, meeting Brupbacher on the descent, where he encouraged her to turn around. According to the expedition report, she refused and continued to the summit alongside her sherpa, Pasang Gyalzen Sherpa.

After reaching the summit of Makalu, and descending to Camp 4 on 21 May, Brupbacher died of acute mountain sickness (AMS) in her tent at Camp 3 at an altitude of 7400 m on the 22 May 2011. Egocheaga was already in base camp. On May 21, before Brupbacher died, Egocheaga and Ramos tried to organize a rescue, however efforts were unsuccessful. After her death, her body was left in the tent at camp 3. Fabrizio Zangrilli, a climber from the team sent to render aid to Brupbacher before she died, went up, collapsed the tent over her, and packed snow over the tent to bury her body.

After her death, her family started Joëlle Ayuda, a Nepalese non-profit organization to help disadvantaged children with education and medical care in Nepal's Makalu Valley.

== Notable ascents ==
- 2006: Broad Peak, 8051 m, Pakistan-China
- 2007: Dhaulagiri, 8167 m, Nepal
- 2007: Cho Oyu, 8188 m, Nepal-China
- Gasherbrum II, 8035 m, Pakistan-China
- 2010: Ama Dablam 6814 m, Nepal - summit disputed
- 2011: Makalu, 8485 m, Nepal-China - summit disputed
