= David J. Moore =

American businessman

David J Moore
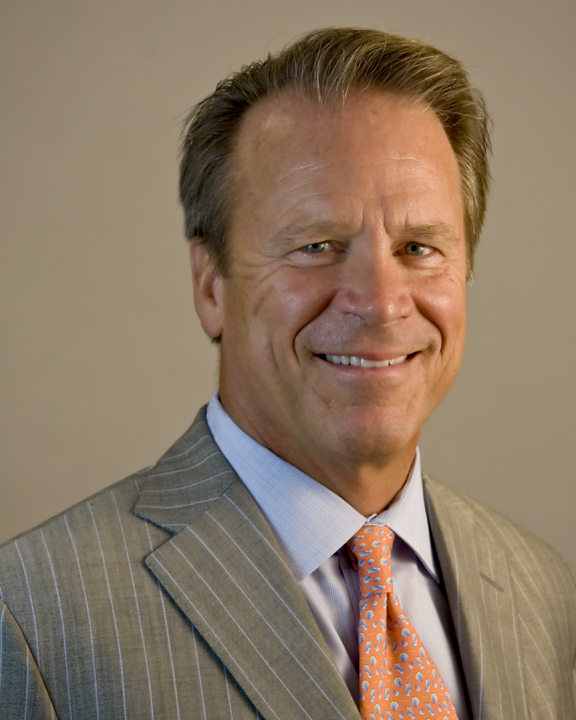
- Known for: Founder, CEO of 24/7 Real Media former IAB Chairman
- Website: 24/7 Real Media

David J. "Dave" Moore is an American businessman. He is a former IAB chairman, current IAB board member since 2001, and Chairman, CEO and Founder of 24/7 Real Media. Moore is also the Chairman of IAI Advisory Committee. He is on the board of Visible Technologies, on the board of a non-profit AEF and on the board of Auditude.

== Career ==
Prior to starting 24/7 Real Media, Mr. Moore was an executive at Petry Media, from which he bought Petry Interactive, one of three companies that combined to form 24/7 Media. He got his start in advertising with Turner Broadcasting in 1979. Mr. Moore founded 24/7 Real Media in 1995, took it public in 1998 and sold it to WPP in 2007 for $649 million. In 2009 he was elected Chairman of IAB.

== Personal life ==
Mr. Moore is an avid sportsman - he swam, as a member of a six-person relay, across both the English Channel and around the Island of Manhattan. David Moore began competitively swimming in 2002 and has participated in numerous triathlons and marathons, including an Ironman Triathlon in 2003.

== Quotes ==
"We simply refused to give up" in response to why his company 24/7 Real Media survived and prospered.
