= OM-85 =

Immunostimulant that counters respiratory infections

Clinical data
- Trade names: Broncho-Vaxom
- Other names: OM 85BV

Identifiers
- CAS Number: 88402-38-4

OM-85 or OM85 (trade name Broncho-Vaxom commercialised by OM Pharma) is an immunostimulant. It is a combination of molecules extracted from the walls of bacteria that commonly cause respiratory infections.

== Uses ==
It has been sold, as Broncho-Vaxom, in Europe and some South American countries. It is used for children with asthma or recurrent respiratory infections.

Studies have shown that OM-85 can enhance both innate and adaptive immunity by promoting the maturation of dendritic cells in the gastrointestinal Peyer's patches, which in turn strengthens immune defenses in the lung mucosa.

It can also reduce inflammation. This is achieved through the reduction of pro-inflammatory cytokines and the increase of anti-inflammatory cytokines.

== Potential uses ==
It may help prevent COVID-19.

It may prevent babies from developing asthma.

== Composition ==
It is a mix of lipopolysaccharides, extracted from bacteria cell walls. These include Haemophilus influenzae, Streptococcus pneumoniae, Klebsiella pneumoniae, Klebsiella ozaenae, Staphylococcus aureus, Streptococcus pyogenes, Streptococcus sanguinis, and Moraxella catarrhalis.

== Clinical trials ==
It has been studied in numerous pediatric clinical trials.

=== Adults ===
A randomized, double-blind, placebo-controlled study in 396 patients with chronic bronchitis demonstrated a 28% reduction in respiratory tract infections in patients treated with OM-85, associated with a reduction in antibiotic prescriptions, and no increase in adverse events.

In a randomized, double-blind, placebo-controlled 6-month study performed in 381 patients with severe COPD and a long smoking history, OM-85 induced a 55% reduction in the number of hospitalization days for respiratory diseases compared to placebo.

A subsequent randomized, double-blind, placebo-controlled trial in 273 patients aged >40 years with recently diagnosed chronic bronchitis or COPD and current exacerbation showed that the exacerbation rate was reduced by 29% with OM-85 compared to placebo. This reduction was more pronounced in patients who were smokers or ex-smokers, showing a 40% lower mean rate of exacerbation vs. placebo.

A more recent study demonstrated the ability of OM-85 to protect COPD patients from exacerbations by significantly reducing the percentage of patients with exacerbations after 12 weeks of treatment and maintaining its beneficial effect until 22 weeks, with a positive tolerability profile.

=== Children ===
The use of OM-85 for 10 consecutive days every month for 3 months was shown to reduce the risk of recurrent respiratory infection in children, with a favorable safety profile. The protective effect was highest in children with the highest risk, suggesting that OM-85 administration might be particularly useful and should be recommended in these subjects.

A prospective, randomized, single-blind study in 68 children aged 36–59 months treated with OM-85 for 3 months with 10-day cycles and receiving influenza vaccine 15 days after the first cycle demonstrated a more pronounced reduction of upper and lower respiratory tract infections. Moreover, a reduction in antibiotic use and the number of missed school days was recorded, with no interference of OM-85 on the immune response against the influenza vaccine and no increase in adverse events.

In a randomized, double-blind placebo-controlled study performed in children aged 6–13 years with ≥3 acute episodes of respiratory infection in the 6 months before enrollment, treatment with OM-85 for 6 months induced a 52% reduction in the number of infections compared to placebo. OM-85 use was also associated with a reduction in antibiotic use, days of illness, and school absenteeism, with no increase in adverse events.

A randomized, double-blind placebo-controlled study in 75 pre-school children with a history of frequent wheezing episodes demonstrated that a single OM-85 course reduced both rhinopharyngitis and wheezing episodes by 38% over 12 months, with a significant reduction in the cumulative frequency of wheezing episodes compared to placebo and in the percentage of patients using antibiotics.
