= Iron polymaltose =

Iron-based medication

Names
- IUPAC name iron(3+);(2R,3S,4R,5R)-2,3,4,5-tetrahydroxy-6-[(2S,3R,4S,5S,6R)-3,4,5-trihydroxy-6-(hydroxymethyl)oxan-2-yl]oxyhexanal;trihydroxide
- Other names: Iron(III) hydroxide polymaltose complex; Iron polymaltose

Identifiers
| CAS Number | 53858-86-9 |
| 3D model (JSmol) | Interactive image |
| ChemSpider | 32701213 |
| EC Number | 892-609-0 |
| PubChem CID | 76960246 |
| UNII | UM5219H89V |
- InChI: InChI=1S/C12H22O11.Fe.3H2O/c13-1-4(15)7(17)8(18)5(16)3-22-12-11(21)10(20)9(19)6(2-14)23-12;;;;/h1,4-12,14-21H,2-3H2;;3*1H2/q;+3;;;/p-3/t4-,5+,6+,7+,8+,9+,10-,11+,12-;;;;/m0..../s1 Key: PKMVWNYIYVZXIQ-MPAYLTKRSA-K
- SMILES: C([C@@H]1[C@H]([C@@H]([C@H]([C@H](O1)OC[C@H]([C@H]([C@@H]([C@H](C=O)O)O)O)O)O)O)O)O.[OH-].[OH-].[OH-].[Fe+3]

Properties
| Chemical formula | C_{12}H_{25}FeO_{14} |
| Molar mass | 449.163 g·mol^{−1} |

Hazards
- GHS labelling
| Pictograms | (GHS07: Exclamation mark) |
| Signal word | Warning |
| Hazard statements | H315, H319, H335 |
| Precautionary statements | P261, P264, P264+P265, P271, P280, P302+P352, P304+P340, P305+P351+P338, P319, P321, P332+P317, P337+P317, P362+P364, P403+P233, P405, P501 |
- Except where otherwise noted, data are given for materials in their standard state (at 25 °C [77 °F], 100 kPa). Infobox references

Iron(III)-hydroxide polymaltose complex is a medication used to treat iron deficiency / iron deficiency anemia and belongs to the group of oral iron preparations. The preparation is a macromolecular complex, consisting of iron(III) hydroxide (trivalent iron, Fe^{3+}, Fe(OH)_{3}·H_{2}O) and the carrier polymaltose and is available in solid form as a film-coated or chewable tablet and in liquid form as a syrup, drinkable solution, or drops. It is used for treating iron deficiency without anemia (latent iron deficiency) or with anemia (apparent iron deficiency). Prior to administration, the iron deficiency should be diagnostically established and verified via laboratory tests (e.g., low ferritin concentration, low transferrin saturation).

The drug has been on the market since 1978 and is approved in over 85 countries. In many countries it is known with brand name Maltofer.

== Pharmacology ==
=== Mode of action ===
The drug is absorbed in the small intestine, primarily in the duodenum and jejunum. Absorption occurs via a controlled, active mechanism. No passive diffusion takes place, which ensures that practically no unbound (to transferrin) iron reaches the blood. The absorbed iron is primarily stored in the liver as ferritin (protein used for iron storage) and subsequently made available to the body for various functions, primarily for incorporation into the red blood cells' hemoglobin, thereby transporting oxygen in the blood.

=== Pharmacodynamics ===
The utilization and absorption by the erythrocytes of the iron administered orally in the form of iron polymaltose complex is correlated with the absorption in the intestines, whereby the relative absorption decreases with increased dosage and the more severe the iron deficiency, the greater the Absorption. As with ascorbate and sulfate oral iron preparations, only about 10-15% of the iron is absorbed. A dose of 100 mg of iron is thus necessary in order for 10 mg to be absorbed.

=== Pharmacokinetics ===
After administration, the maximum absorption capacity is reached already after 30 minutes and continuously increasing absorption can be observed over 24 hours. The non-absorbed iron is excreted via the stool.

=== Effectiveness, safety ===
The effectiveness and safety have been investigated and documented in numerous clinical studies and in various patient populations. This has included children, young people, adults, and the elderly, in addition to pregnant women and breastfeeding mothers.

==== Important clinical studies ====
===== Study in pregnant women =====
Randomized, open, multicenter, controlled study in pregnant women affected by iron deficiency anemia. INTERVENTION: Iron polymaltose 100 mg 2x a day in comparison to iron sulfate 100 mg 2x a day. STUDY DURATION: 90 days. RESULTS: hemoglobin improvement after 90 days by 2.16g/dL (iron polymaltose) and 1.93g/dL (iron sulfate). Ferritin levels after 90 days: 17.9 ng/mL (iron polymaltose), 15.7 ng/mL (iron sulfate). Side-effects observed in 29.3% of patients receiving iron polymaltose and 56.4% of those receiving iron sulfate.

===== Study in children =====
Randomized, open study in children affected by iron deficiency anemia. INTERVENTION: Iron polymaltose 5 mg/kg body weight in one administration a day, compared to iron sulfate 5 mg/kg body weight, divided up over 2 administrations a day. STUDY DURATION: 4 months. RESULTS: hemoglobin improvement after 4 months by 2.3g/dL (iron polymaltose) and 3g/dL (iron sulfate). Fewer gastrointestinal side-effects with iron polymaltose. The mean acceptance value after 4 months was higher with iron polymaltose than with iron sulfate.

===== Study in adults =====
Randomized, multicenter, double-blind study in adults affected by iron deficiency anemia. INTERVENTION: Iron polymaltose 100 mg 2x a day in comparison to iron sulfate 60 mg 3x a day. STUDY DURATION: 9 weeks. RESULTS: hemoglobin improvement in both groups after 3, 6, and 9 weeks, whereby after 3 and 6 weeks, a significant improvement was observed in the iron sulfate group. After 9 weeks, comparable improvement in both groups. Side-effects occurred in 22% of patients receiving iron polymaltose and 25% of those receiving iron sulfate.

==== Contraindications ====
Iron polymaltose must not be used in the event of known hypersensitivity or intolerance to the active ingredient or one of the excipients. Iron preparations are not administered to treat anemia that is not associated with iron deficiency. Furthermore, iron preparations must not be used in the event of known iron overload or iron utilization disorders.

==== Interactions ====
Iron polymaltose must not be administered at the same time as parenteral iron preparations. No interactions with other medications or foods are known.

==== Side-effects ====
Commonly observed side-effects, occurring in 1 to 10% of cases, include stool discoloration, diarrhea, nausea, and dyspepsia. Uncommon side-effects, occurring in 0.1 to 1% of cases, include constipation, vomiting, stomachache, tooth discoloration, itchiness, and headache. As very rare side-effects, occurring in 0.1 to 0.01% of cases, allergic reactions have been observed.

== Dosage and administration ==
The preparation is available in various galenic formulations: syrup, drops, drinkable solution, film-coated tablets, and chewable tables. The syrup, drops, or drinkable solution are preferable for children. The preparation is dosed according to age. The following general dosage guidelines apply (for iron deficiency with anemia):

- Premature babies: 2.5–5 mg/kg body weight
- Children up to 1 year of age: 25–50 mg
- Children 1–12 years of age: 50–100 mg
- Young people age 12 and up and adults: 100–300 mg
- Pregnant women: 100–300 mg

The quantity of active ingredient per unit is 100 mg of iron per chewable or film-coated tablet, 50 mg of iron per 1mL of drops, 10 mg of iron per 1mL of syrup, 100 mg of iron per 1 drinkable solution (5mL).

Iron polymaltose should be taken with food, as this improves absorption.

== Excipients ==
The preparation contains different excipients depending upon the galenic formulation.

- Chewable tablets: cyclamate, vanillin, fersip, aromatica, excip. pro compr.
- Drops: conserv.: E217, E219; sucrose, vanillin, aromatica, excip. ad solut.
- Syrup: conserv.: E216, E218; sucrose, vanillin, aromatica, excip. ad solut.
- Drinkable solution: conserv.: E217, E219; sucrose, vanillin, aromatica, fersip, excip. ad solut.
- Film-coated tablets: excip. pro compr.

== Packaging, storage ==
The preparation should be stored in its original packaging at room temperature (15-25 °C) and consumed by the date printed on the packaging.
