= CSL Vifor =

Swiss pharmacuetical company

- Type: Public
- Traded as: SIX: VIFN
- ISIN: CH0364749348
- Industry: Pharmaceutical
- Founded: 1927
- Headquarters: Switzerland
- Areas served: Worldwide
- Key people: Hervé Gisserot (General Manager)
- Revenue: ▲CHF 1.75 billion (2021)
- Parent: CSL Limited
- Website: www.viforpharma.com

CSL Vifor is a global specialty pharmaceuticals company in the treatment areas of iron deficiency, dialysis, nephrology & rare disease. It is headquartered in Switzerland and consists of CSL Vifor, Vifor Fresenius Medical Care Renal Pharma (VFMCRP) and Sanifit Therapeutics.

== History ==
- In 1872, Caspar Friedrich Hausmann founds a pharmacy in St. Gallen
- In 1927, 16 pharmacists establish a joint purchasing centre, Collaboration Pharmaceutique SA, which went on to be renamed Galenica AG in 1933 (later to be renamed Vifor Pharma Ltd. in 2017)
- In 1944, The pharmacist René Grosclaude founds Vifor Ltd; the company produces over-the-counter medicines
- In 1983, Hausmann AG laboratories is acquired by Galenica
- In 1991, Vifor (International) Ltd. is founded and takes over the work of Laboratorien Hausmann in developing new iron products
- In 2008, Vifor Pharma is founded following the $915 million acquisition of a Canadian company, Aspreva Pharmaceutical Corporation, Vifor Ltd. and Vifor (international) Ltd. are integrated in Vifor Pharma.
- In 2009, Galenica acquires OM Pharma, a Swiss biotechnology company
- In 2010, Vifor Pharma Group and Fresenius Medical Care found the joint company Vifor Fresenius Medical Care Renal Pharma (VFMCRP)
- In 2014, Galenica is divided into two divisions, Vifor Pharma and Galenica Santé
- In 2016, Relypsa, a US based biotechnology company, is purchased for $1.53 billion
- In 2017, the IPO of Galenica Santé (GALE) is completed and listed on the Swiss Stock Exchange. Galenica AG (GALE) and Vifor Pharma AG (VIFN) are listed as independent entities since
- In 2018, the US Food and Drug Administration FDA approved a Supplemental New Drug Application for the potassium binder Veltassa with or without food
- In 2019, Vifor Fresenius Medical Care Renal Pharma (VFMCRP) received the Swiss Success Award from the non-profit organisation Swiss Biotech Association
- In 2020, Vifor Pharma sells 100% of OM Pharma to Optimus Holding Limited for CHF 435 million
- In 2020, Vifor Pharma also forms a Joint Venture agreement with Fresenius Kabi for the market in the People's Republic of China in the area of intravenous iron deficiency treatments
- In the same year, a deal with Cara Therapeutics for the commercialisation of Difelikefalin to treat CKD-aP patients has been signed.
- In 2021 Vifor Pharma concluded a licensing agreement for the commercialisation of Sparsentan in Europe, Australia, and New Zealand.
- In the same year, Tavneos was approved in the US, Japan and the EU. Korsuva / Kapruvia reached approval in the United States and the EU.
- In November 2021, Vifor Pharma Group acquired Sanifit with its novel inhibitor of vascular calcification SNF472 for the treatment of calcific uremic arteriolopathy (CUA) and peripheral artery disease (PAD) in patients with end-stage kidney disease. On the same day, Vifor announced the acquisition of Swiss-based Inositec who develops treatments for soft tissue and vascular calcification disorders and aortic valve stenosis (AVS).
- In December 2021 CSL Limited announced it would acquire Vifor Pharma for CHF 10.9 billion (US$11.7 billion). The capital raising is considered one of the ten largest secondary-market deals worldwide in 2021.
- In August 2022 the acquisition of Vifor Pharma by Australian company CSL was completed. Vifor Pharma became CSL Vifor.

== Activity ==
CSL Vifor is active in the treatment of iron deficiency and iron deficiency anaemia. The Group also has a focus on the management of conditions in nephrology, cardiology and rare diseases. Iron deficiency treatments Ferinject and Injectafer were accountable for more than a third of its revenues in 2021.

The dialysis segment with the Erythropoiesis-Stimulating Agents Mircera (Methoxy polyethylene glycol-epoetin beta) and Retacrit (Epoetin alfa-epbx) as well as the phosphate binder Velphoro (Sucroferric oxyhydroxide) has a similarly high turnover as the iron deficiency area, which also includes the orally administered treatment Maltofer (iron polymaltose). The potassium binder Veltassa (Patiromer) is the most selling treatment in the nephrology segment.

CSL Vifor is a member of a number of trade associations that advocate on behalf of the pharmaceutical industry and for the policy positions commonly shared, this includes the European Federation of Pharmaceutical Industries and Associations (EFPIA). CSL Vifor has formed collaborations with pharmaceutical companies like American Regent, Roche, Fresenius Medical Care, Fresenius Kabi and Pfizer. It has also partnered with biotechs such as Akebia, Angion Biomedica, Cara Therapeutics, ChemoCentryx and Travere Therapeutics.

== Structure and operations ==
CSL Vifor is present in North and South America, Europe, the Middle East and Asia Pacific and is active in over 100 countries all around the world. R&D sites of the group are located in Switzerland. The company is headquartered in St. Gallen where its core manufacturing capabilities on active pharmaceutical ingredient (API) production of its iron therapies are concentrated. The operational headquarters for sales, marketing, medicine and registration are located in Glattbrugg. CSL Vifor maintains a research site on iron deficiency in the Bio-Technopark in Schlieren. The Zürich-based subsidiary Inositec is an ETH spin-off. Sanifit Therapeutics is based in Palma de Mallorca. In China, Vifor Fresenius Kabi is among the top 10 multinational pharmaceutical companies as a market leader in clinical nutrition, anesthesia and nephrology.

CSL Vifor develops, manufactures and markets pharmaceutical products. The Group's businesses include CSL Vifor, focused on iron deficiency and iron deficiency anaemia, and Vifor Fresenius Medical Care Renal Pharma, focused on kidney disease patients, including anaemia, mineral and bone management, cardio-renal conditions, and rare diseases. The second joint company of CSL Vifor with Fresenius is Vifor Fresenius Kabi focusing on marketing iron deficiency drugs in China. CSL Vifor includes also Sanifit Therapeutics from Spain active in the field of calcification disorders in Chronic Kidney Disease. Nephtera is a joint venture with Evotec to build a nephrology therapeutic pipeline.

== Therapeutic areas ==
Iron deficiency is a condition in which iron availability is insufficient to meet body needs. It affects one out of three women of reproductive age worldwide. CSL Vifors first treatment in this area dates back to the pioneering work of pharmacist Caspar Friedrich Hausmann in 1872 in St. Gallen. Iron-deficiency anemia, inflammatory bowel disease (IBD), chronic heart failure (CHF) and patient blood management (PBM) are conditions treated by iron-based products of CSL Vifor.

Besides Iron, the Swiss company focusses on the therapeutic areas Dialysis, Nephrology and Rare Diseases. Vifor Fresenius Medical Care Renal Pharma (VFMCRP), the joint company with Fresenius Medical Care since 2010, gives CSL Vifor access to a network of dialysis centers. It is active in the treatment of chronic kidney disease (CKD), chronic kidney disease-associated pruritus, renal anemia and hyperphosphatemia.

In the therapeutic area nephrology and rare disease, CSL Vifor specializes on hyperkalemia, secondary hyperparathyroidism, ANCA-associated vasculitis, beta-thalassemia and sickle cell disease, CKD-associated peripheral artery disease and aortic valve stenosis, focal segmental glomerulosclerosis, IgA nephropathy and cardiac surgery-associated Acute kidney injury (CSA-AKI).

== Products and in-Licensing ==
Apart from its own manufactured iron products, CSL Vifor enters partnerships and is in-licensing products at an advanced stage of development additionally to its own research and development (R&D). CSL Vifor has concluded cooperation and licensing agreements with both large pharmaceutical companies and smaller biotech companies.

Commercialized Products

- Ferinject/Injectafer (Ferric carboxymaltose)
- Maltofer (Iron polymaltose)
- Mircera (Methoxy polyethylene glycol-epoetin beta) (in-licensed from Roche)
- Veltassa (Patiromer)
- Velphoro (Sucroferric oxyhydroxide)
- Venofer (Iron sucrose)
- Retacrit (Erythropoiesis-stimulating agent) (in-licensed from Pfizer)

Pipeline products

- Korsuva (Difelikefalin) (in-licensed from Cara Therapeutics)
- INS-3001
- Rayaldee (Calcifediol) (in-licensed from OPKO Health)
- Sparsentan (in-licensed from Travere Therapeutics)
- SNF472
- Tavneos (Avacopan) (in-licensed from ChemoCentryx Inc.)
- Vadadustat (in-licensed from Akebia Therapeutics)
- Vamifeport (developed by CSL Vifor)
