= Auguetbrücke =

Bridge in Bern, Switzerland

Coordinates: 46°55′09″N 7°30′01″E

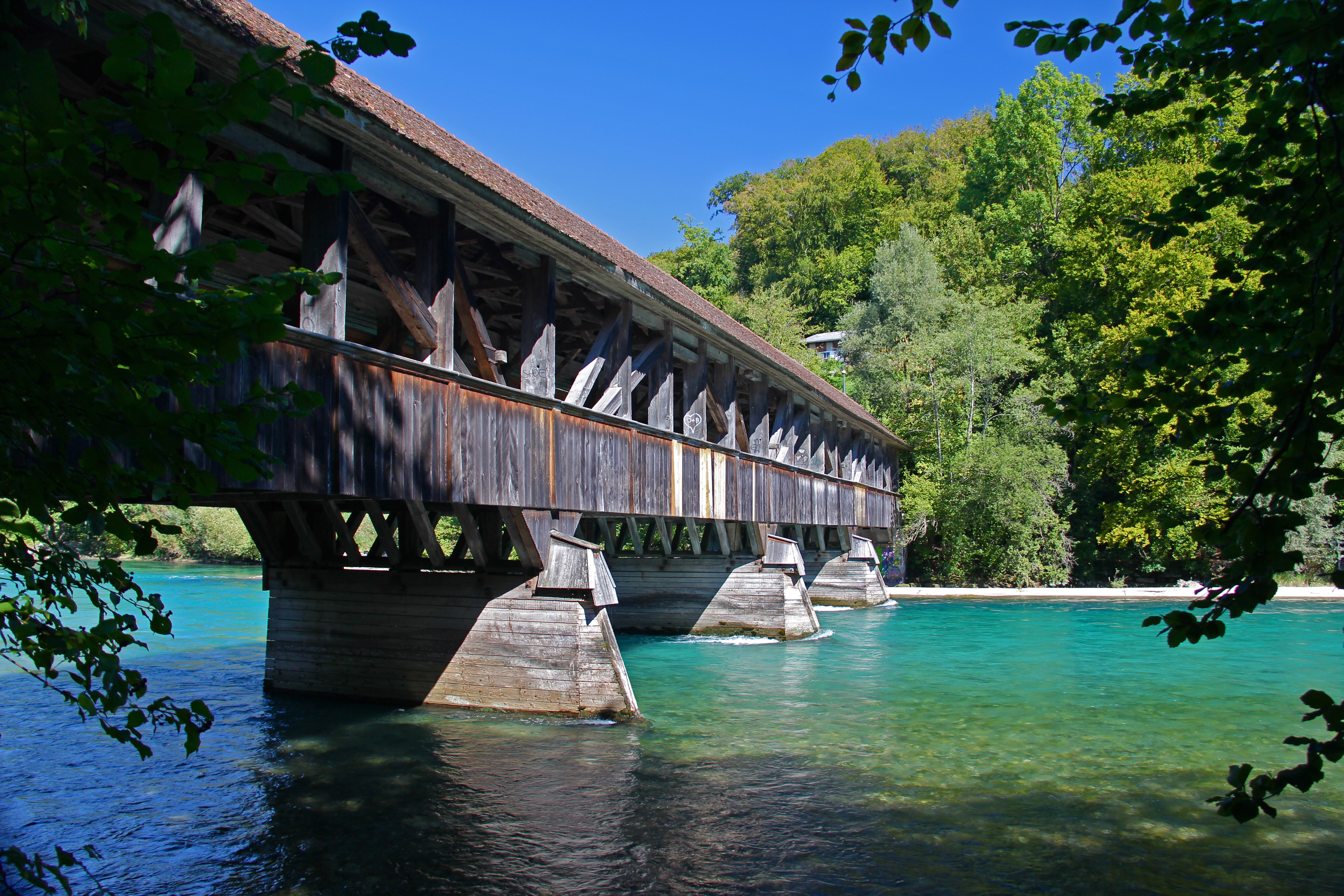
Exterior view of the Auguetbrücke spanning the Aare River between Muri bei Bern and Belp

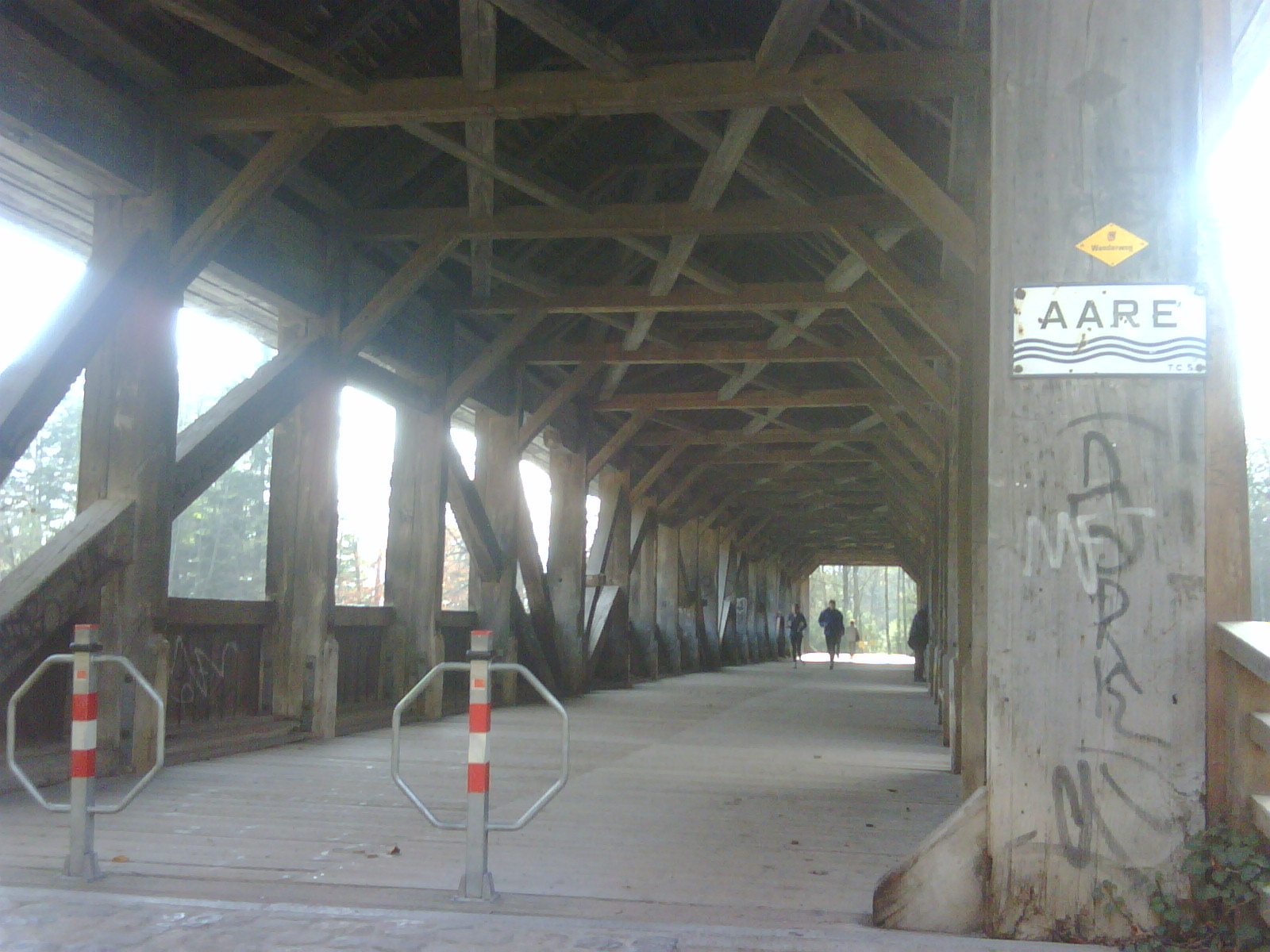
Interior of the covered wooden Auguetbrücke, showing its timber construction

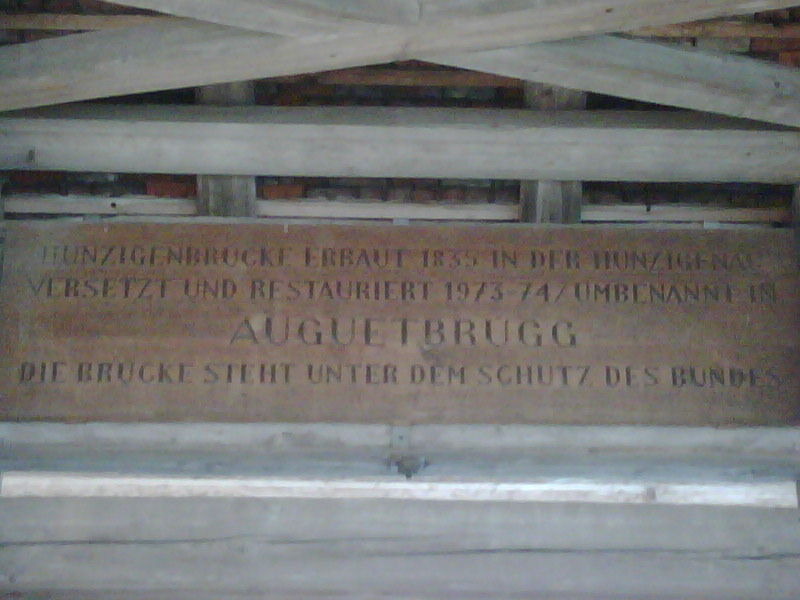
Commemorative plaque noting the bridge’s original construction, relocation, and heritage status

The Auguetbrücke is a 60-metre-long covered wooden bridge over the Aare River between Muri bei Bern and Belp in the Swiss canton of Bern. Originally constructed in 1836 and later relocated to its present site, it now serves as a pedestrian crossing and occasional event venue. The bridge is listed in the Swiss Inventory of Cultural Property of National and Regional Significance as a B-object.

== History ==
The Auguetbrücke was originally constructed near Hunzigen as part of the road link between the districts of Konolfingen and Seftigen, supported on three timber pile piers. Municipal records date the construction to 1836, while a commemorative plaque on the bridge records 1835. The location of the original crossing is still marked by an old tollhouse. In 1974, the bridge was dismantled and relocated about five kilometres downstream to Auguet, where it reopened as a pedestrian crossing and is occasionally used for small events.

A commemorative plaque also notes the bridge's protection under Swiss federal heritage law, consistent with its listing in the Swiss Inventory of Cultural Property of National and Regional Significance as a B-object, where it appears under both the municipality of Muri bei Bern (KGS no. 05299) and the municipality of Belp (KGS no. 00603).

In August 2015, two women died after their inflatable boat collided with a bridge pier of the Auguetbrücke on the Aare and were dragged under water by the river’s currents. The Swiss Life Saving Society (SLRG) warned that bridge piers can create dangerous currents and eddies capable of pulling a person underwater. According to municipal officials in Muri, signage was in place to warn river users about the hazard.

In May 2025, the Auguetbrücke was officially opened to bicycle traffic, closing a gap in the cantonal cycle network. The change allows cyclists to cross between Belp and Muri and connect with existing national and regional cycling routes.

== See also ==
- Aare
- Covered bridge
- List of cultural property of national significance in Switzerland: Bern
