= Gümligen Castle =

Historical castle in Switzerland

- Schloss Gümligen
- Muri bei Bern
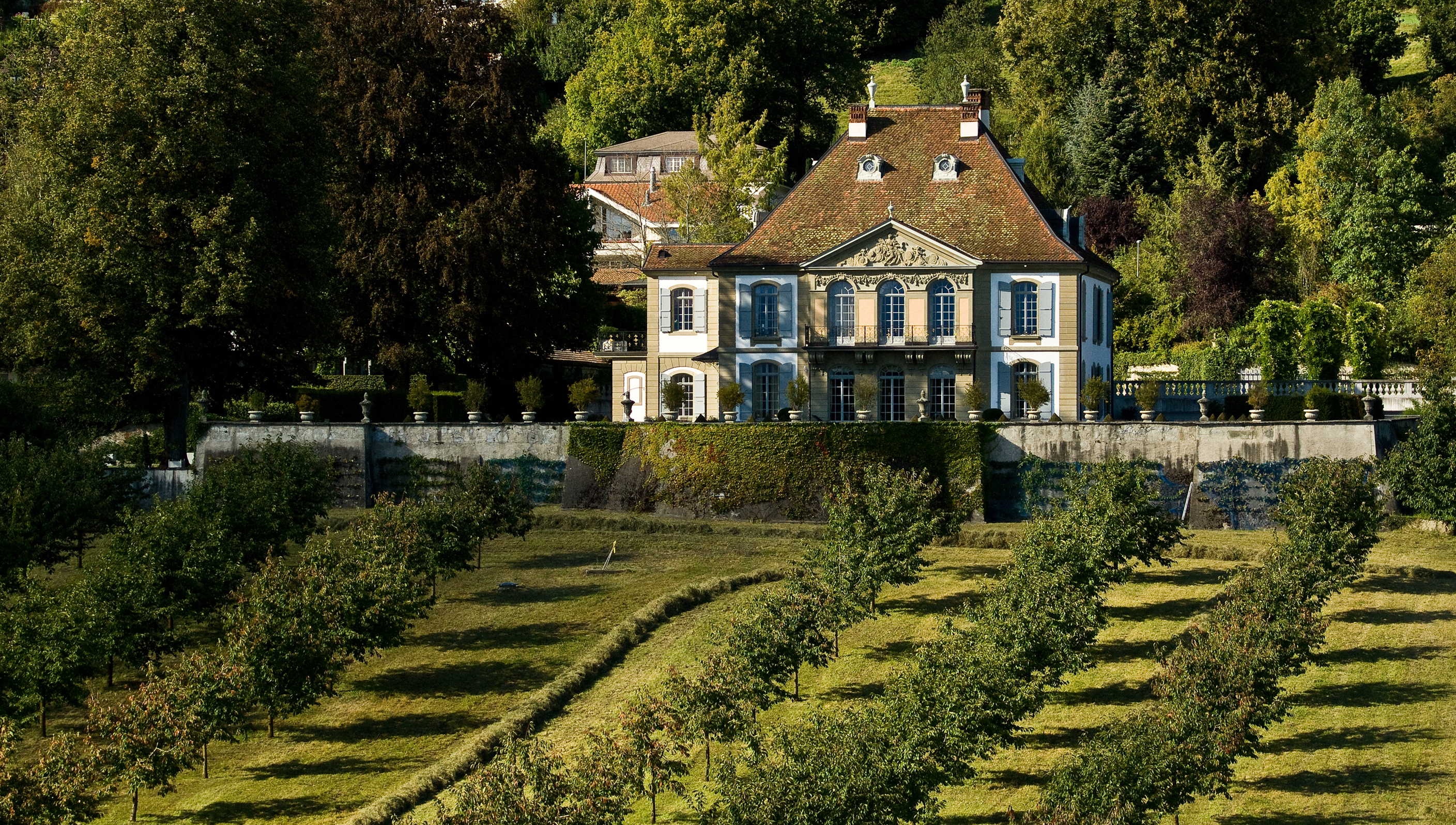

Site information
- Type: Manor house
- Condition: Preserved

Location
- Coordinates: 46.9347°N 7.5153°E

Site history
- Built: 1736

Gümligen Castle is a castle in the municipality of Muri bei Bern of the Canton of Bern in Switzerland. It is a Swiss heritage site of national significance.

== History ==
The manor house was built around 1736-39 for head postmaster Beat Fischer by the architect Albrecht Stürler in a late Baroque style. However, the elaborate building proved too expensive for the postmaster and in 1742 it was sold to Samuel Tiller, who then sold it in 1764 to Emanuel Karl Viktor Stürler. His widow then sold the estate in 1788 to their son in law, Friedrich Heinrich von Stürler. The castle remained in the von Stürler family for over two hundred years.

During World War II, from 1939 until 1941 it served as the headquarters and official residence for the Swiss General Henri Guisan.

In 2000, the von Stürler family sold the castle to a businessman, Willy Michel, who restored the building.

== See also ==
- List of castles in Switzerland
- Baroque architecture
- Rococo
