= NZZ Geschichte =

Swiss history magazine

NZZ Geschichte is a German language bimonthly history magazine which has been in circulation since 2015 in Switzerland. The magazine is the first Swiss magazine in its category.

== History and profile ==
NZZ Geschichte was first published on 16 April 2015 as a quarterly magazine. The magazine is part of the NZZ Mediengruppe and based in Zürich. It publishes articles on Swiss and international history written by historians. The frequency of the magazine was switched to bimonthly later.
