= OM Pharma =

Swiss biopharmaceutical company

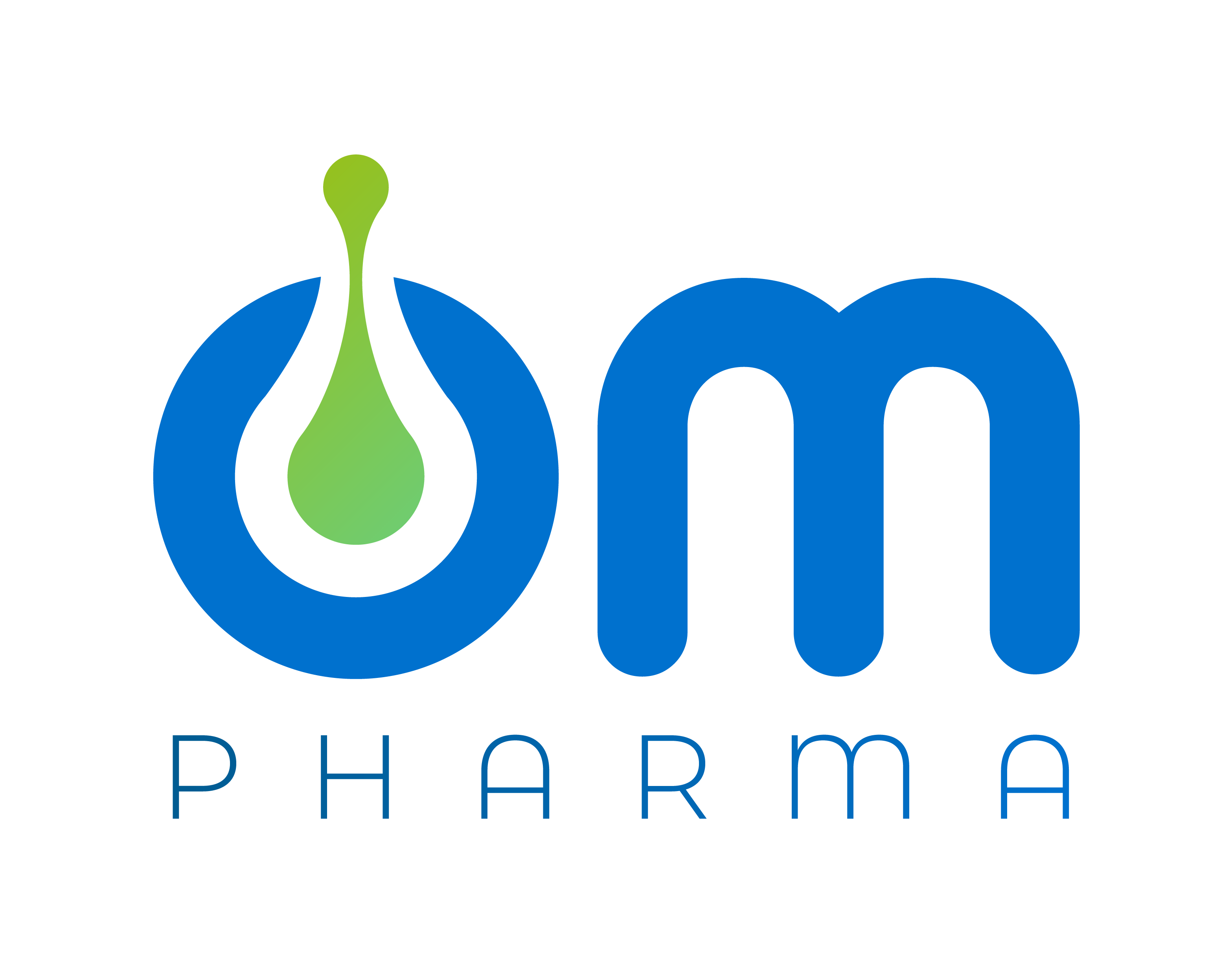
- Type: Société Anonyme
- Industry: Biopharmaceutical
- Founded: Barcelona, (1930)
- Headquarters: Geneva, Switzerland
- Area served: Worldwide
- Key people: Roch Ogier (CEO)
- Products: OM-85; OM-89
- Owner: Etienne Jornod (Executive Chairman & Co‑Owner)
- Number of employees: 422
- Website: www.ompharma.com

OM Pharma is a Swiss biopharmaceutical company headquartered in Geneva. The company develops, manufactures and commercialises medicines in areas including respiratory tract infections, urinary tract infections and vascular diseases. It is active in more than 100 countries and its portfolio includes bacterial lysates based products, such as OM-85 and OM-89, as well as other established pharmaceutical products.

In 2020, the company became part of Optimus Holding, led by Etienne Jornod.In 2021, OM Pharma received the Geneva Economy Award.

OM Pharma is the only pharmaceutical company that manufactures in Geneva.

== Business and operations ==
OM Pharma’s activities include research and development, manufacturing, commercial operations and partnerships with distributors and marketing organisations. The company works with more than 90 distribution and marketing partners across 100 countries.

OM Pharma employs more than 400 people. Its global headquarters and biotech campus are located in Meyrin, Geneva, and the company also has a Swiss affiliate in Villars-sur-Glâne, Fribourg.

The company operates in Latin America through an affiliate in Lima, Peru. It also maintains a sales force in Central America, covering Guatemala, El Salvador, Honduras, Nicaragua, Costa Rica, Panama and the Dominican Republic.

In 2025, OM Pharma reported CHF 350 million in in-market sales and stated that its core portfolio reached 15.9 million people.

== History ==
=== Origins ===
OM Pharma traces its origins to Barcelona in 1930, when French pharmacist Jean-René Ricard founded a small pharmaceutical laboratory focused on biologically derived medicines. The outbreak of the Spanish Civil War in 1936 forced the Ricard family to leave Spain, and in 1937 the company relocated to Geneva, Switzerland. At that point the business was renamed OM Pharma, with OM standing for the Latin expression Omnia Medicamenta, meaning all medicines.

=== Integration into CSL Vifor/Galenica ===
In 1970, OM Pharma relocated its main operations to Meyrin, where the company continues to operate. In 2009, it was acquired by Galenica, a part of the Vifor Pharma Group.

=== Acquisition by Optimus Holding ===
In 2020, OM Pharma was acquired by Optimus Holding, led by former Vifor Pharma Executive Chairman Etienne Jornod with a consortium of investors. As part of the transaction, Optimus Holding committed to investing over CHF 250 million to enhance the company’s manufacturing and research capabilities. Since 2024, Roch Ogier has served as the company’s CEO.

== Products ==
OM Pharma’s products include:

- Broncho-Vaxom, also known as OM-85, is a bacterial lysate made from 21 bacterial strains. It is used for the prevention of recurrent respiratory tract infections in adults and children. In 2025, the product reached more than 5.1 million patients and was registered in 69 countries.
- Uro-Vaxom, also known as OM-89, is a bacterial lysate derived from 18 strains of Escherichia coli. It is used for recurrent urinary tract infections. In 2025, the product reached more than one million patients and was registered in 53 countries.
- The company also markets medicines for vascular diseases. These include Doxium, based on calcium dobesilate, indicated in treatment of microangiopathies, signs of chronic venous insufficiencies in the lower limbs, diabetic retinopathy and hemorrhoidal syndrome, and Dicynone, based on etamsylate, indicated in the treatment of capillary hemorrhages.

In Switzerland, OM Pharma markets a wider portfolio of proprietary and in-licensed medicines across several therapeutic areas, including respiratory infections, urology, gynaecology, central nervous system disorders, vascular diseases and hospital care.

== Research and development ==
The company’s research programme includes both non-interventional real-world evidence studies and interventional clinical trials.

The REACH study, formally titled Real-World Evidence study of OM-85 in Adults and Children in China, Italy, and Belgium, is a non-interventional study evaluating OM-85 (Broncho-Vaxom^{®}) in routine clinical practice. It is designed to assess the effectiveness of OM-85 in preventing respiratory tract infection episodes and to describe how patients with respiratory tract infections are managed in different healthcare settings.

Preliminary results from the REACH study released at the EAACI 2026 congress show that OM-85 was associated with reductions in RTI recurrence and healthcare utilisation at 12 and 24 months after treatment initiation, compared with the 12 months prior to starting the therapy. Further results are expected to be published later in 2026.

=== Clinical trials ===
TIGER: The TIGER study is a randomised, placebo-controlled, 3-arm, double-blind, multicentre, Phase 4 study to assess the efficacy of OM-85 short- and long-term treatment vs. placebo in the prevention of respiratory tract infections in children aged 6-12 years with asthma. About 50 sites are participating across China and Hong Kong.

Broncho-Vaxom Efficacy Assessment in Respiratory tract infections (BEAR): BEAR is a randomised, placebo-controlled, 3-arm, double-blind, multi-centre, Phase 4 study to assess the efficacy of OM-85 (Broncho-Vaxom) short- and long-term treatment vs. placebo in the prevention of respiratory tract infections, in children aged between 6 months and 5 years with wheezing lower respiratory illness. About 40 sites are participating across Europe, including in Hungary, Poland, UK, Switzerland, Italy and Germany.

Efficacy Assessment in recurrent wheezinG chiLdrEn (EAGLE): EAGLE is a randomized, placebo-controlled, double-blind, multicenter, Phase 2b study to assess the efficacy and safety of daily OM-85 treatment vs. placebo in children aged 6 months to 5 years with recurrent wheezing.
