= NZZ Mediengruppe =

Swiss media company

- Industry: Media
- Founded: 1780; 246 years ago
- Headquarters: Zürich
- Key people: Felix Graf (CEO)
- Products: Neue Zürcher Zeitung; NZZ am Sonntag; Swiss Economic Forum; Zurich Film Festival; CH Media
- Website: www.nzzmediengruppe.ch

NZZ (Neue Zürcher Zeitung) Mediengruppe (also known as AG für die Neue Zürcher Zeitung) is a media company which deals with the activities related to the newspaper, magazine, book publishing and television broadcasting in Zürich, Switzerland. The company has products for the German-speaking regions of the country.

== History and profile ==
NZZ Mediengruppe was established in 1780 with the start of its flagship paper Neue Zürcher Zeitung. As of 2014, Veit Dengler was the chief executive officer of the group of which headquarters is in Zürich. The company has a liberal stance and does not support collectivism or corporatism.

The group has business activities in the fields of newspaper and magazine publishing, book publishing, and regional radio and television broadcasting. The company also operates online editions of the publications it has.

The newspaper publishing division of the group consists of two companies, NZZ and Free Press Holding AG. In addition to Neue Zürcher Zeitung, the company also owns regional daily newspapers, namely the St. Galler Tagblatt and Neue Luzerner Zeitung. The group owned 74.93% of the St. Galler Tagblatt AG, which publishes St. Galler Tagblatt, via its subsidiary Free Press Holding AG. In May 2014, Free Press Holding AG acquired the company's remaining stake from PubliGroupe. The company involved in the establishment of the joint venture CH Media in 2018.

NZZ Mediengruppe was the owner of the Bund Verlag AG, publisher of the daily newspaper Der Bund, until 2003 when it was sold to the Espace Media Groupe.

NZZ Mediengruppe was the fourth major magazine publisher in Switzerland in terms of circulation in the years of 2005, 2008 and 2012. One of the new additions is NZZ Geschichte, a history magazine, which was launched in Zürich in April 2015.

In relation to book publishing the subsidiary of the company is NZZ Libro. NZZ Film und Fernsehen is another subsidiary of the company which produces television programs.
