= Publigroupe =

Swiss advertising company

Publigroupe S.A.
- Formerly: Publicitas; Haasenstein & Vogler (1858–1916)
- Company type: Joint-stock company
- ISIN: CH0004626302
- Industry: Advertising, media communication
- Founded: 1858 in Altona, near Hamburg
- Defunct: 2018
- Fate: Bankruptcy
- Headquarters: Lausanne, Switzerland (from 1930)
- Number of employees: 2,618 (2009)

Publigroupe S.A. (formerly Publicitas) was a Swiss advertising and media communication company based in Lausanne. Originating in 1858 as the German firm Haasenstein & Vogler, it operated internationally for much of the 20th century before going bankrupt in the 2010s.

== History ==
The advertising firm Haasenstein & Vogler was founded in 1858 in Altona near Hamburg. It moved to Basel in 1868 and then to Geneva in 1890. In 1916 it adopted the less German-sounding name Publicitas, and from 1930 its main seat was in Lausanne. During the 20th century the firm established itself across Europe—notably in Paris in 1947, and in the Netherlands, Belgium, and England in 1972—in the Far East in 1984, and later in North America.

The company became Publicitas Holding SA in 1989 and then PubliGroupe SA in 1997, operating as a communication business serving the media and advertisers. In 1999 it formed a joint venture with Swisscom for directory activities. In 2009 PubliGroupe SA had a turnover of 1.6 billion francs and 2,618 employees.

In 2014 the Publicitas advertising agency was separated from PubliGroupe SA and sold to a German holding company. This did not prevent the bankruptcy of the firm, which employed about 270 people in 2018. In its place, the media groups NZZ-Mediengruppe (Neue Zürcher Zeitung), Tamedia (Tages-Anzeiger), AZ Medien, Corriere del Ticino, and Médias Suisses founded AdAgent AG, which was put into liquidation as early as 2019.

== Bibliography ==
- Zermatten, Maurice et al., Publicitas, 1965
- Bartu, Friedemann, Umbruch. Die Neue Zürcher Zeitung. Ein kritisches Porträt, 2020

=== Archives ===
- Archives cantonales vaudoises, Chavannes-près-Renens, Archives privées, Fonds PubliGroupe, PP 1048
