= Swiss Performance Index =

Stock index in Switzerland

- Foundation: 1 June 1987 (publication 22 August)
- Operator: SIX Swiss Exchange
- Exchanges: SIX Swiss Exchange
- Trading symbol: SXGE
- Constituents: 202 (as of July 19, 2026)
- Type: All-caps, total return index
- Market cap: CHF 1,879 billion (full, June 2026)
- Weighting method: Market-value-weighted
- Related indices: SMI, SPI 20, SPI Extra
- Website: six-group.com
- ISIN: CH0009987501
- Reuters: .SSHI
- Bloomberg: SPI:IND

Structure of the SPI-Family

The Swiss Performance Index (SPI) is a wide total-return index that tracks equity primarily listed on SIX Swiss Exchange with a free-float of at least 20%, and excluding investment companies. The index covers large, mid and small caps and is weighted by market capitalization. Most constituents, although not all, are domiciled in Switzerland or the Principality of Liechtenstein.

The SPI is Switzerland's most closely followed performance index. It is used as a benchmark for mutual funds, index funds and ETFs, and as an underlying index for derivative financial instruments such as options, futures and structured products.

In 2020, the SPI, along with other SIX indices, was endorsed under the EU Benchmarks Regulation and is registered with the European Securities and Markets Authority, which means that it can be used as an underlying for financial products sold in the EU.

In 2025, additionally a Net-Return variant of the SPI Index was introduced.

== SPI Universe ==
The underlying share universe of the SPI is the Swiss All Share Index and includes approximately 230 equity issues. For a company's shares to be included in the SPI, the company must be domiciled in Switzerland and the shares must have a free float equal to or greater than 20%.

In 1998, investment companies were taken out of the SPI Family and put into the specially designed Investment Index in order to avoid double (direct + indirect) listing of SPI components. Exceptions to this rule can be granted to Investment Companies that invest in companies not primarily listed at SIX.

The SPI acts in turn as the universe of several other indices offered by SIX Swiss Exchange:

- the Swiss Market Index and the SPI 20
- the SMI MID and the SMI Expanded
- the SPI Extra, defined as the complement of the SMI in the SPI universe
- the Swiss Leader Index and its complement, the SPI ex SLI
- various subindices of the SPI, by size and sector, described further down

== Components ==
Below is the list of the 202 SPI shares as of July 19, 2026. It is based on publicly available information and may be inaccurate, in particular for companies with low free float. Some of the companies are primarily listed in Switzerland, but have their headquarters outside Switzerland and were included in the underlying share universe upon request. Some companies have two kinds of shares and thus appear twice in the SPI.

Symbol	Company	SMI Family	Listing	Remarks
ABBN	ABB	SMI		
ACLN	Accelleron	SMI MID	2022	
ADEN	Adecco	SMI MID		
ADVN	Adval Tech Holding			
ADXN	Addex Pharmaceuticals			
AERO	Montana Aerospace		2021	
AEVS	Aevis Victoria			previously Aevis Holding
ALC	Alcon	SMI	2019	
ALLN	Allreal Holding		2000	
ALSN	ALSO Holding			
AMRZ	Amrize	SMI	2025	
AMS	ams AG			headquarters outside Switzerland
APGN	APG SGA AG			
ARBN	Arbonia			previously AFG Arbonia-Forster-Holding
ARYN	Aryzta		2008	
ASCN	Ascom			
ASWN	ASmallWorld		2018	
AUTN	Autoneum		2011	
AVOL	Avolta	SMI MID	2005	Was previously Dufry
BAER	Julius Bär	SMI MID	2009	
BANB	Bachem Holding			
BARN	Barry Callebaut	SMI MID		
BBN	Bellevue Group			
BCGE	Banque Cantonale de Genève			
BCHN	Burckhardt Compression		2006	
BCJ	Banque Cantonale du Jura			
BCVN	Banque Cantonale Vaudoise			
BEAN	Belimo Holding	SMI MID		
BELL	Bell Food Group			
BEKN	Berner Kantonalbank		2000	
BION	BB Biotech			
BIOV	Bioversys		2025	
BKW	BKW Energie		2003	
BLKB	Basellandschaftliche Kantonalbank			
BMAG	Bajaj Mobility		2016	previously KTM Industries, Pierer Mobility
BOSN	Bossard Holding			
BRKN	Burkhalter Holding		2008	
BSKP	Basler Kantonalbank			
BSLN	Basilea Pharmaceutica		2004	
BUCN	Bucher Industries			
BVZN	BVZ Holding		2007	
BYS	Bystronic AG			previously Conzzeta
CALN	Calida			
CFR	Compagnie Financière Richemont	SMI		
CFT	Compagnie financière Tradition			
CHAM	Cham Swiss Properties		2025	merged from Ina Invest
CICN	Cicor Technologies			
CLN	Clariant	SMI MID		
CLTN	Coltene Holding			
CMBN	Cembra Money Bank		2013	
CNTL	Centiel		2026	
COPN	Cosmo Pharmaceuticals		2007	headquarters outside Switzerland
COTN	Comet Holding		2002	
CPHN	CPH Chemie + Papier		2001	
CURN	Curatis		2024	reverse merger with Kinarus
DAE	Dätwyler Holding			
DESN	Dottikon ES			
DKSH	DKSH		2012	
DOCM	DocMorris		2023	previously Zur Rose Group
DOKA	Dormakaba			
DSFIR	DSM-Firmenich		2023	merger between Dutch Royal DSM and Firmenich
EFGN	EFG International		2005	
ELMN	Elma Electronic			low free float (still in SPI?)
EMMN	Emmi		2004	
EMSN	Ems-Chemie	SMI MID		
EPIC	Epic		2022	
ESUN	Edisun Power		2008	
EVE	Evonext		2009	previously Evolva
FHZN	Flughafen Zürich AG	SMI MID		
FORN	Forbo Holding			
FREN	Fundamenta Real Estate AG		2018	
FTON	Feintool International Holding			
GALD	Galderma	SMI MID	2024	
GALE	Galenica	SMI MID	2017	
GAM	GAM			
GAV	Carlo Gavazzi Holding			
GEBN	Geberit	SMI		
GF	Georg Fischer	SMI MID		
GIVN	Givaudan	SMI	2000	
GLKBN	Glarner Kantonalbank		2014	
GMI	Groupe Minoteries SA			
GRKP	Graubündner Kantonalbank			
GURN	Gurit Holding			
HBAN	Helvetia Bâloise	SMI MID	2025	Merged from Bâloise and Helvetia
HBLN	Hypothekarbank Lenzburg			
HIAG	HIAG Immobilien		2014	
HLEE	Highlight Event and Entertainment			
HOLN	Holcim	SMI		
HUBN	Huber + Suhner			
IDIA	Idorsia		2017	
IFCN	INFICON		2001	
IMPN	Implenia			
INFRAC	Infracore		2026	
INRN	Interroll			
IREN	Investis			
ISN	Intershop Holding			
JFN	Jungfraubahn			
KARN	Kardex Group			
KLIN	Klingelnberg		2018	
KNIN	Kühne + Nagel	SMI		
KOMN	Komax Holding			
KUD	Kudelski			
KURN	Kuros Biosciences			
LAND	Landis+Gyr		2017	
LECN	Leclanché			
LEHN	Lem Holding			
LEON	Leonteq			
LISN	Lindt & Sprüngli	SMI MID		registered share
LISP	Lindt & Sprüngli	SMI MID		participation certificate
LLBN	Liechtensteinische Landesbank			headquarters outside Switzerland
LMN	lastminute.com			headquarters outside Switzerland
LOGN	Logitech	SMI		
LONN	Lonza Group	SMI		
LUKN	Luzerner Kantonalbank			
MCHN	MCH Group		2001	
MED	Medartis		2018	
MEDX	medmix		2021	spin off from Sulzer
METN	Metall Zug			
MIKN	Mikron Holding			
MMTX	Mindmaze Therapeutics		2025	combination with Relief Therapeutics
MOBN	Mobimo Holding		2005	
MOLN	Molecular Partners		2014	
MOVE	Medacta Group		2019	
MOZN	Mobilezone		2001	
MTG	Meier Tobler			
NESN	Nestlé	SMI		
NOVN	Novartis	SMI		
NREN	Novavest Real Estate		2019	
NWRN	Newron Pharmaceuticals		2006	headquarters outside Switzerland
OERL	OC Oerlikon			
OFN	Orell Füssli			
ORON	Orior		2010	
PEAN	Peach Property		2010	
PEDU	Perrot Duval Holding			
PEHN	Private Equity Holding			
PGHN	Partners Group	SMI	2006	
PLAN	Plazza		2015	
PMN	Phoenix Mecano			
PPGN	Polypeptide		2021	
PSPN	PSP Swiss Property	SMI MID	2000	
REHN	Romande Énergie			
RIEN	Rieter			
RO	Roche I	SMI MID		
ROP	Roche PS	SMI		
RSGN	R&S Group		2023	first successful SPAC in Switzerland, 2023
SANN	Santhera Pharmaceuticals Holding		2006	
SCHN	Schindler Holding	SMI MID		registered share
SCHP	Schindler Holding	SMI MID		participation certificate
SCMN	Swisscom	SMI		
SDZ	Sandoz		2023	spin off from Novartis
SENS	Sensirion Holding		2018	
SFPN	SF Urban Properties			
SFSN	SFS Group		2014	
SFZN	Siegfried Holding AG			
SGKN	St.Galler Kantonalbank		2001	
SGSN	SGS	SMI MID		
SHLTN	SHL Telemedicine			
SIGN	SIG Combibloc Services AG	SMI MID	2018	
SIKA	Sika AG	SMI		
SKAN	Skan		2021	previously BV Holding on the BX exchange
SLHN	Swiss Life	SMI		
SMG	Swiss Marketplace Group		2025	
SNBN	Schweizerische Nationalbank			
SOON	Sonova	SMI MID		
SPSN	Swiss Prime Site	SMI MID	2000	
SQN	Swissquote		2000	
SRAIL	Stadler Rail		2019	
SREN	Swiss Re	SMI		
STGN	StarragTornos			merger between Starrag and Tornos in 2023
STMN	Straumann Group	SMI MID		
STRN	Schlatter Holding			
SUN	Sulzer AG			
SUNN	Sunrise		2024	spin off from Liberty Global, second time it is listed
SWON	SoftwareONE		2019	
SWTQ	Schweiter Technologies			
TECN	Tecan			
TEMN	Temenos Group	SMI MID	2001	
TIBN	Titlis Bergbahnen			
TKBP	Thurgauer Kantonalbank		2014	
TXGN	TX Group		2000	previously Tamedia
UBSG	UBS	SMI	1998	
UHR	Swatch Group	SMI MID		bearer share
UHRN	Swatch Group			registered share
VACN	VAT Group	SMI MID	2016	
VAHN	Vaudoise Assurances			
VARN	Varia US Properties		2016	
VATN	Valiant Holding			
VBSN	IVF Hartmann Holding			
VETN	Vetropack Holding			
VILN	Villars Holding			
VLRT	Valartis Group			still in the SPI?
VONN	Vontobel			
VPBN	VP Bank			headquarters outside Switzerland
VZN	VZ Holding			
VZUG	V-Zug		2020	
WARN	Warteck Invest			
WIHN	WISeKey		2016	
WKB	Walliser Kantonalbank			
XLS	Xlife Sciences		2022	
YPSN	Ypsomed Holding		2004	
ZEHN	Zehnder Group			
ZUBN	Züblin Immobilien Holding			
ZUGER	Zuger Kantonalbank			
ZUGN	Zug Estates		2012	
ZURN	Zurich Insurance Group	SMI		

== Classification ==
SPI components are classified by size, by sector as well as by security category.

=== By size ===
There are three size categories of SPI components: large-cap, mid-cap and small-cap. Three SPI subindices reflect these sizes, respectively the SPI Large, the SPI Middle and the SPI Small. Two more subindices cover Large+Middle as well as Middle+Small.

The SPI 20 is another SPI subindex that contains the same companies as in the Swiss Market Index. It mostly overlaps with the SPI Large, but does not fully coincide because of the rules specific to the SMI. For this reason, another subindex, the SPI Extra, includes all SPI companies not in the SPI 20.

=== By sector ===
The SPI is divided into sectors on the basis of economic activity. This classification is based on a proprietary sector classification by SIX, which simplifies international performance comparisons significantly.

=== By security category ===
SPI Stocks are also grouped by security category: registered shares, bearer share, participation certificates.

== Methodology ==
Paid prices are taken into account in calculating the SPI as a whole. If no paid prices are available, the index is calculated on the basis of bid prices. The index is recalculated and published every three minutes. On 1 June 1987, the SPI was standardised at 1000 points.

== Investing ==
The SPI index is tracked by several Exchange Traded Funds, such as the iShares Core SPI ETF or the UBS ETF (CH) SPI. In addition, various providers are offering structured investment products using the SPI index as underlying.

== Swiss All Share Index ==
The Swiss All Share Index contains all companies primarily listed at SIX that are headquartered in Switzerland or the Principality of Liechtenstein. It has 232 components. These are all the SPI components, but also equity with less than 20% of free float and investment companies. The additional companies contained in the Swiss All Share Index are listed below, as of November 12, 2019.

Company	Remarks
Alpine Select	Investment Index
Baumgartner	
Castle Alt	Investment Index
Castle Private	Investment Index
Datacolor	
EEII	
Energiedienst	
ENR Russia Invest	
HBM	Investment Index
nebag	Investment Index
New Value	Investment Index
Panalpina	
The Native	Investment Index

== Milestones ==
The following table shows historic milestones of the Swiss Performance Index. Latest seen values are not final: parentheses indicate that the value can be seen again while the bull market persists; italic indicates that the value will be seen again if we reenter a bear market (markets drop by 20%); Other values may be seen again in case of a crash (assuming a threshold of -50%).

To keep the scale logarithmic, it uses increments similar to exchange ticks: 1 between 5 and 10, 2 between 10 and 20, 5 between 20 and 50, 10 between 50 and 100, etc.

(Closing price)	Value	First seen	Latest seen
Calibration	1,000.00	June 1, 1987	February 21, 1991
Minimum (all times)	753.44	January 13, 1988	January 13, 1988
Milestone	2,000.00	January 31, 1994	October 30, 1995
Milestone	3,000.00	April 22, 1997	April 2, 2003
Milestone	4,000.00	January 28, 1998	March 31, 2009
Milestone	5,000.00	July 1, 1998	November 28, 2011
Milestone	6,000.00	February 16, 2006	November 19, 2012
Milestone	7,000.00	January 3, 2007	June 26, 2013
Milestone	8,000.00	January 13, 2014	February 15, 2016
Milestone	9,000.00	December 3, 2014	January 3, 2017
Milestone	10,000.00	April 27, 2017	March 24, 2020
Milestone	12,000.00	June 18, 2019	May 18, 2020
Milestone	14,000.00	March 23, 2021	November 14, 2023
Milestone	16,000.00	August 18, 2021	April 23, 2025
Milestone	18,000.00	December 18, 2025	(April 8, 2026)
Milestone	20,000.00	June 25, 2026	(October 15, 2026)
Maximum close	20,585.70	August 10, 2026	(August 10, 2026)
Maximum (all times)	20,636.94	August 11, 2026	
