= SMI Expanded =

Swiss stock index

- Foundation: November 15, 2004 (history from January 3, 1996)
- Operator: SIX Swiss Exchange
- Exchanges: SIX Swiss Exchange
- Trading symbol: SMIEXP
- Constituents: 50
- Type: Large and mid cap, price index
- Market cap: CHF 1,741 billion (full, June 2026)
- Weighting method: Market value-weighted, free-float-adjusted
- Related indices: SMI, SMI MID, SPI
- ISIN: CH0019399853
- Reuters: .SMIEXC
- Bloomberg: SMIEXC

The SMI Expanded is a capitalization-weighted stock index of large-cap and mid-cap companies listed on the SIX Swiss Exchange.

It is made up of the components in the Swiss Market Index (SMI) and in the SMI MID, representing more than 90% of the total SPI market capitalization. It was created on November 15, 2004, and retroactively computed from January 3, 1996, with a calibration on 1,000 points as of December 31, 1999.

== Current constituents ==
The current 50 constituents are the 20 large-cap companies listed on the Swiss Market Index (SMI) page and the 30 mid-caps listed on the SMI MID page.

Rank	Name	Industry	Ticker	Canton	Index
1	Novartis AG	Health care	NOVN	Basel	SMI
2	Roche Holding AG (2 share lines)	Health care	RO, ROP	Basel	SMI, SMI MID
3	Nestlé SA	Retail staples	NESN	Vaud	SMI
4	ABB Ltd	Industrials	ABBN	Zurich	SMI
5	UBS Group AG	Financials	UBSG	Zurich/Basel	SMI
6	Compagnie Financière Richemont SA	Retail discretionary	CFR	Geneva	SMI
7	Zurich Insurance Group AG	Financials	ZURN	Zurich	SMI
8	Holcim Limited	Materials	HOLN	St. Gallen	SMI
9	Lonza Group AG	Health care	LONN	Basel	SMI
10	Swiss Re Ltd	Financials	SREN	Zurich	SMI
11	Givaudan SA	Retail discretionary	GIVN	Geneva	SMI
12	Swisscom AG	Communication services	SCMN	Bern	SMI
13	Sika AG	Materials	SIKA	Zug	SMI
14	Alcon Inc.	Health care	ALC	Fribourg	SMI
15	Swiss Life Holding AG	Financials	SLHN	Zurich	SMI
16	Kuehne + Nagel International AG	Industrials	KNIN	Schwyz	SMI
17	Partners Group Holding AG	Financials	PGHN	Zug	SMI
18	Geberit AG	Industrials	GEBN	St. Gallen	SMI
19	Logitech International SA	Information technology	LOGN	Vaud	SMI
20	Amrize AG	Materials	AMRZ	Zug	SMI
21	Galderma SA	Health care	GALD	Zug	SMI MID
22	Sandoz Group AG	Health care	SDZ	Basel	SMI MID
23	Schindler Holding Ltd (2 share lines)	Industrials	SCHN,SCHP	Lucerne	SMI MID
24	Chocoladefabriken Lindt & Sprüngli AG (2 share lines)	Retail staples	LISN,LISP	Zurich	SMI MID
25	VAT Group	Industrials	VACN	St. Gallen	SMI MID
26	Helvetia Baloise	Financials	HBAN	Basel	SMI MID
27	SGS AG	Industrials	SGSN	Geneva	SMI MID
28	Straumann Group	Health care	STMN	Basel	SMI MID
29	Ems-Chemie Holding AG	Materials	EMSN	Schwyz	SMI MID
30	Julius Baer Group Ltd.	Financials	BAER	Zurich	SMI MID
31	Sonova Holding AG	Health care	SOON	Zurich	SMI MID
32	Belimo Holding AG	Industrials	BEAN	Zurich	SMI MID
33	Swiss Prime Site AG	Real estate	SPSN	Zurich	SMI MID
34	Swatch Group Ltd.	Retail discretionary	UHR	Biel	SMI MID
35	Flughafen Zürich AG	Industrials	FHZN	Zurich	SMI MID
36	Accelleron AG	Industrials	ACLN	Aargau	SMI MID
37	Avolta AG	Retail discretionary	AVOL	Basel-City	SMI MID
38	PSP Swiss Property	Real estate	PSPN	Zug	SMI MID
39	Barry Callebaut AG	Retail staples	BARN	Zurich	SMI MID
40	Swissquote Group Holding Ltd	Financials	SQN	Vaud	SMI MID
41	SIG Group	Materials	SIGN	Schaffhausen	SMI MID
42	Temenos AG	Information technology	TEMN	Geneva	SMI MID
43	Galenica AG	Health care	GALE	Bern	SMI MID
44	Georg Fischer AG	Industrials	GF	Schaffhausen	SMI MID
45	Sunrise Communications AG	Communication services	SUNN	Zurich	SMI MID
46	Adecco Group	Industrials	ADEN	Zurich	SMI MID
47	Clariant AG	Materials	CLN	Basel-Landschaft	SMI MID
