= Swiss Leader Index =

- Foundation: 2 July 2007
- Operator: SIX Swiss Exchange
- Exchanges: SIX Swiss Exchange
- Trading symbol: SLI
- Constituents: 30
- Type: Large and mid-cap, price index
- Market cap: CHF 968 billion (free-float and capped-market adjusted, end June 2026)
- Weighting method: Capitalization-weighted, with 9/4.5 capping
- Related indices: SMI, SMI MID, SMI Expanded, SPI
- Website: six-group.com
- ISIN: CH0030252883
- Reuters: .SLI
- Bloomberg: SLI:IND

The Swiss Leader Index (SLI) is an index comprising large and mid-cap companies primarily listed on SIX Swiss Exchange. It is made up of 30 of the largest and most liquid Swiss Performance Index (SPI) large- and mid-cap publicly listed company shares. As a price index, the SLI is not adjusted for dividends, but there exists a total-return version as well.

The SLI was introduced on 2 July 2007 and computed back to 30 December 1999, with a baseline value of 1,000 points on this starting date.

The capping model of the SLI makes it suitable as a benchmark for a broader range of products and markets than other indices offered by SIX Swiss Exchange, because it is compatible with regulatory requirements in the European Union as well as in the United States. With its 9/4.5 caps, the SLI is more diversified, and its risk/return profile is more tilted towards smaller capitalizations, than other indices such as the SMI and SPI.

In 2020, the SLI, along with other SIX indices, was endorsed under the EU Benchmarks Regulation and is registered in ESMA, which means that it can be used as an underlying for financial products sold in the EU.

== Rules ==
=== Universe ===
The SLI comprises the 20 securities of the SMI, as well as the largest 10 securities in the SMI MID.

=== Capped weightings ===
The largest four components of the SLI are capped at 9%. All other components, if necessary, are capped at 4.5%. The caps are enforced with a multiplication factor that is updated every three months.

This was made to conform the SLI to the EU's UCITS 5/10/40 rule, which says that:

- The value of any single position cannot be more than 10% of the fund's value, and
- all positions that are larger than 5% of the fund's value cannot, together, make up more than 40% of the fund's value.

=== Current constituents ===
As of November 7, 2025, the following 30 stocks make up the SLI index. Components marked as ^{1} have a 9% weight as of 7 November 2025. Sizes are based on the SPI classification by market capitalization: L for SPI Large, M for SPI Mid.

Company	size	SMI	GICS Sector	Canton	Ticker symbol
ABB	L	SMI	Industrials	Zurich	ABBN
Alcon	L	SMI	Health care	Fribourg	ALC
Amrize	L	SMI	Materials	Zug	AMRZ
Galderma	M	SMI MID	Health care	Zug	GALD
Geberit	L	SMI	Industrials	St. Gallen	GEBN
Givaudan	L	SMI	Materials	Geneva	GIVN
Helvetia Bâloise	M	SMI MID	Financials	Basel-City	HBAN
Holcim	L	SMI	Materials	St. Gallen	HOLN
Julius Bär	M	SMI MID	Financials	Zurich	BAER
Kuehne + Nagel	M	SMI	Industrials	Schwyz	KNIN
Lindt (PS)	M	SMI MID	Retail discretionary	Zurich	LISP
Logitech	M	SMI	Information technology	Vaud	LOGN
Lonza	L	SMI	Health care	Basel	LONN
Nestlé^{1}	L	SMI	Retail staples	Vaud	NESN
Novartis^{1}	L	SMI	Health care	Basel	NOVN
Partners Group	L	SMI	Financials	Zug	PGHN
Richemont	L	SMI	Retail discretionary	Geneva	CFR
Roche^{1}	L	SMI	Health care	Basel	ROP
Sandoz Group AG	L	SMI MID	Health care	Basel-City	SDZ
Schindler	M	SMI MID	Industrials	Lucerne	SCHN
SGS	L	SMI MID	Industrials	Geneva	SGSN
Sika	L	SMI	Materials	Zug	SIKA
Sonova	M	SMI MID	Health care	Zurich	SOON
Straumann	L	SMI MID	Health care	Basel City	STMN
Swiss Life	L	SMI	Financials	Zurich	SLHN
Swiss Re	L	SMI	Financials	Zurich	SREN
Swisscom	L	SMI	Communication services	Bern	SCMN
UBS^{1}	L	SMI	Financials	Zurich	UBSG
VAT Group	M	SMI MID	Industrials	St. Gallen	VACN
Zurich Insurance	L	SMI	Financials	Zurich	ZURN
