= SMI MID =

Swiss stock index

- Foundation: 15 November 2004 (history from 3 January 1996)
- Operator: SIX Swiss Exchange
- Exchanges: SIX Swiss Exchange
- Trading symbol: SMIM
- Constituents: 30
- Type: Mid-cap, price index
- Market cap: CHF 285 billion (as of 30 June 2026)
- Weighting method: Market-value-weighted, free-float-adjusted
- Related indices: SMI, SMI Expanded, SPI 20
- Website: official website
- ISIN: CH0019399838
- Reuters: .SMIM
- Bloomberg: SMIM

The SMI MID (SMIM) is a stock index which lists Switzerland's mid-cap companies. The index is calculated by SIX Swiss Exchange.

It includes the 30 Prime Standard shares from sectors that rank immediately below the companies included in the Swiss Market Index. The company size is based on terms of order book volume and market capitalization.

The SMI MID was introduced on 15 November 2004, computed back to 3 January 1996 with a baseline value of 1000 points as of 31 December 1999. Its composition is examined once a year. Calculation takes place in real-time: as soon as a new transaction occurs in a security contained in the SMI MID, an updated index level is calculated and displayed.

In 2020, the SMI MID, along with other SIX indices, was endorsed under the EU Benchmarks Regulation and is registered with the European Securities and Markets Authority, which means that it can be used as an underlying for financial products sold in the EU.

== Constituents ==
The following 30 stocks make up the SMI MID index as of 7 November 2025.

Company	Sector	Canton	Ticker symbol
Accelleron	Industrials	Aargau	ACLN
Adecco	Industrials	Zurich	ADEN
Avolta	Retail discretionary	Basel-City	AVOL
Barry Callebaut	Retail staples	Zurich	BARN
Belimo	Industrials	Zurich	BEAN
Clariant	Materials	Basel-Country	CLN
Ems-Chemie	Materials	Graubünden	EMSN
Flughafen Zürich	Industrials	Zurich	FHZN
Galderma	Health care	Zug	GALD
Galenica	Health care	Bern	GALE
Georg Fischer	Industrials	Schaffhausen	GF
Helvetia Bâloise	Financials	Basel-City	HBAN
Julius Bär	Financials	Zurich	BAER
Lindt & Sprüngli	Retail staples	Zurich	LISN / LISP
PSP Swiss Property	Real estate	Zug	PSPN
Roche (bearer share)	Health care	Basel-City	RO
Sandoz	Health care	Basel-City	SDZ
Schindler	Industrials	Lucerne	SCHN / SCHP
SGS	Industrials	Geneva	SGSN
SIG	Materials	Schaffhausen	SIGN
Sonova	Health care	Zurich	SOON
Straumann	Health care	Basel-City	STMN
Sunrise	Communication services	Zurich	SUNN
Swissquote	Financials	Vaud	SQN
Swatch	Retail discretionary	Bern	UHR
Swiss Prime Site	Real estate	Soloturn	SPSN
Temenos	Information technology	Geneva	TEMN
VAT	Industrials	St.Gallen	VACN

=== Recent adjustments ===
In the week beginning on Monday, 19 September 2022, SGS (formerly in the SMI), Belimo and the Roche bearer shares will enter SMIM. They will replace Sonova (hearing aids), Cembra (credit cards and consumer credits) and BB Biotech (biotechnology investment company).

On March 31, 2022 the biochemical company Bachem was added to the index, replacing Vifor Pharma , because after sell of Vifor Pharma to the Australian CSL the free float dropped to 1.6% which is below the minimum of 20% required by SIX for index members.

On September 18, 2020, four components were replaced.

On October 16, 2020, Tecan was added to the index after the takeover of Sunrise Communications Group AG.

On July 11, 2023, BWK was added to the index. DocMorris was removed from the index.

On September 22, 2023, Sandoz was added to the index. Bachem was removed from the index.

On July 9, 2024, Galderma was added to the index. Meyer Burger was removed from the index.

On September 5, 2025, Sonova, Swissquote, Accelleron and Sunrise were added to the index. ams, BKW, Tecan, Galenica were removed.

On November 7, 2025, Galenica was added to the index.

== See also ==
- Swiss Market Index
