= Robert Schindler =

Robert Schindler may refer to:

- Founder of Schindler Group
- Terri Schiavo's father
