= Swiss Market Index =

Blue-chip stock market index of Switzerland

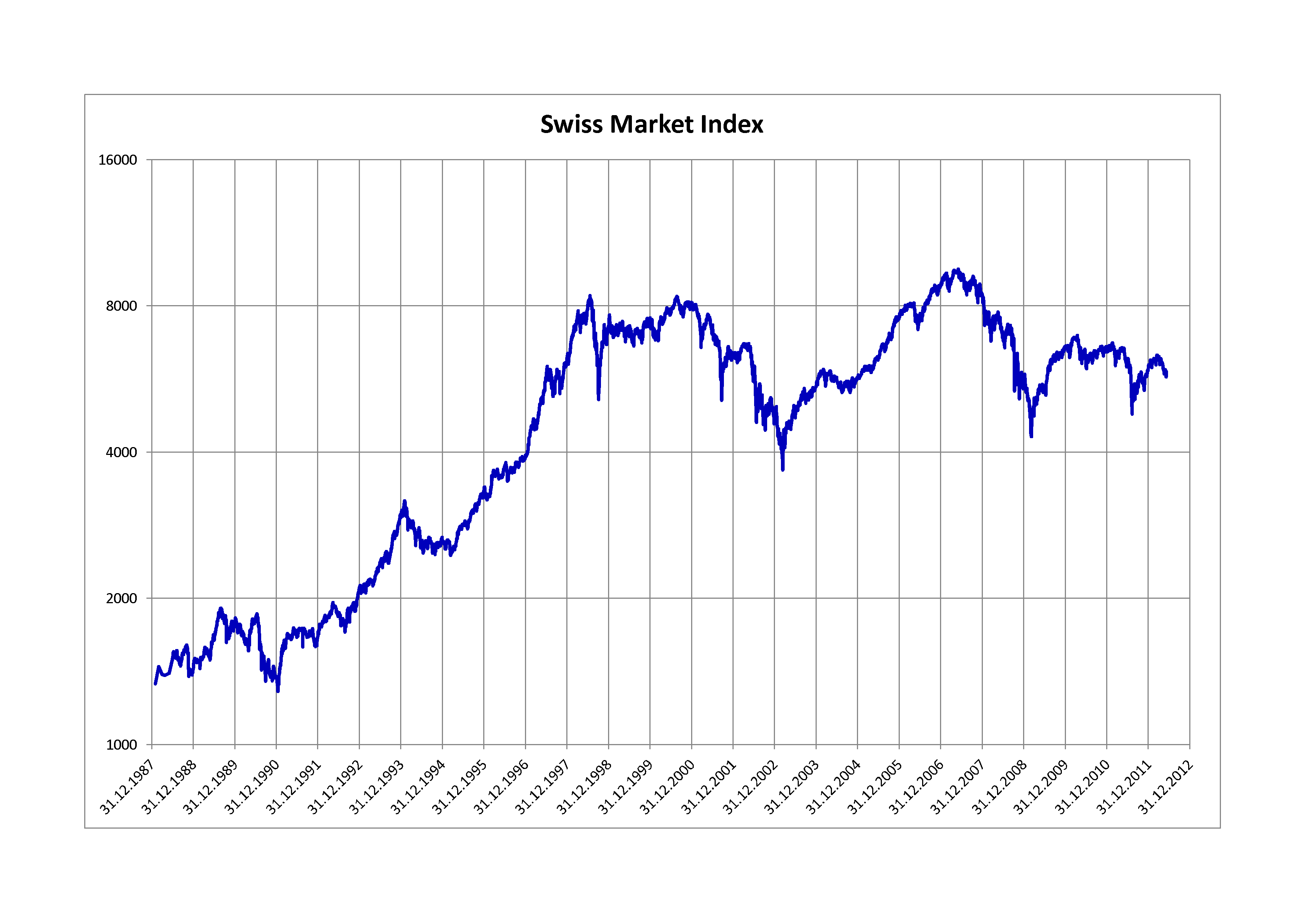
- SMI performance between 1988 and 2012
- Foundation: 30 June 1988
- Operator: SIX Swiss Exchange
- Exchanges: SIX Swiss Exchange
- Trading symbol: SMI
- Constituents: 20
- Type: Large-cap, price index
- Market cap: CHF 1,456 billion (30 June 2026, free-float-adjusted)
- Weighting method: Market-value-weighted
- Related indices: SMI MID, SMI Expanded, SPI 20, SPI, SLI
- Website: six-group.com
- ISIN: CH0009980894
- Reuters: .SSMI
- Bloomberg: SMI:IND

The Swiss Market Index (SMI) is Switzerland's blue-chip stock market index, which makes it the most followed in the country. It is made up of 20 of the largest and most liquid Swiss Performance Index (SPI) stocks. As a price index, the SMI is not adjusted for dividends.

The SMI was introduced on 30 June 1988 at a baseline value of 1,500 points. It closed above the symbolic level of 10,000 points for the first time on 2 July 2019. It reached the 14,000 point milestone on 24 February 2026. It is currently in a bull market, which it entered on 25 February 2025 after breaking its previous record. This ended the bear market that had started on 22 September 2022.

Its composition is examined once a year. As of September 2022, it contains 18 large-caps and two mid-caps. Calculation takes place in real-time. As soon as a new transaction occurs in a security contained in the SMI, an updated index level is calculated and displayed. However, the index is updated no more than once per second. The SMI is calculated in Swiss Francs, the currency of Switzerland.

The securities contained in the SMI currently represent approximately 70% of the free-float Swiss equity market capitalization, as well as 85% to 90% of the total trading turnover of Swiss and Liechtenstein equities listed on the SIX Swiss Exchange. Because the SMI is considered to be a mirror of the overall Swiss stock market, it is used as the benchmark for numerous mutual funds, index funds and ETFs, and as the underlying index for numerous derivative financial instruments such as options, futures and structured products.

In 2020, the SMI, along with other SIX indices, was endorsed under the EU Benchmarks Regulation and is registered with the European Securities and Markets Authority, which means that it can be used as an underlying standard for financial products sold in the EU.

== Rules ==
=== Acceptance criteria ===
The underlying universe of the SMI, from which candidate constituents are selected, is the SPI. To be accepted into the SMI, a given issue must meet stringent requirements with regard to liquidity and market capitalization. On the one hand, it must represent at least 50% of the average liquidity of the SPI constituent issues. On the other hand, it must have a minimum free-float capitalization equal to 0.45% or more of the entire SPI capitalization. Thus, trading volume and capitalization are the determining factors in the quarterly rankings. The composition of the index is reviewed annually on the third Friday in September.

=== Fixed number of 20 securities ===
The SMI comprises a fixed number of 20 securities as of the ordinary review date in September 2007. Prior to this date, the index contained 25 listings.

It is worth noting that the number of constituents of the index (20) is below the generally accepted minimum sample size of 30 required to reach statistical significance.

=== Capped weightings ===
In 2017, in order to address the issue that the top three constituents (Nestlé, Roche, Novartis) account for more than 60% of the index capitalization, SIX Swiss Exchange changed the rules of the SMI to introduce capped weighting. The weight of any constituent in the SMI index can no longer exceed 18%.

Readjusting any weight exceeding 18% down to that value is done, in principle, on a quarterly basis. However, whenever a constituent reaches a weight exceeding 20% during a quarter (intra-quarter breach), then the weight is brought back to 18% without waiting for the next quarterly review.

To make the transition smoother, there was an initial transition period during which these changes were progressively implemented, in steps of at most 3% per quarter.

Additionally, a new index, the SPI 20, was created to continue indexing the 20 SMI constituents without any caps.

== SMI constituents ==
=== Current constituents ===
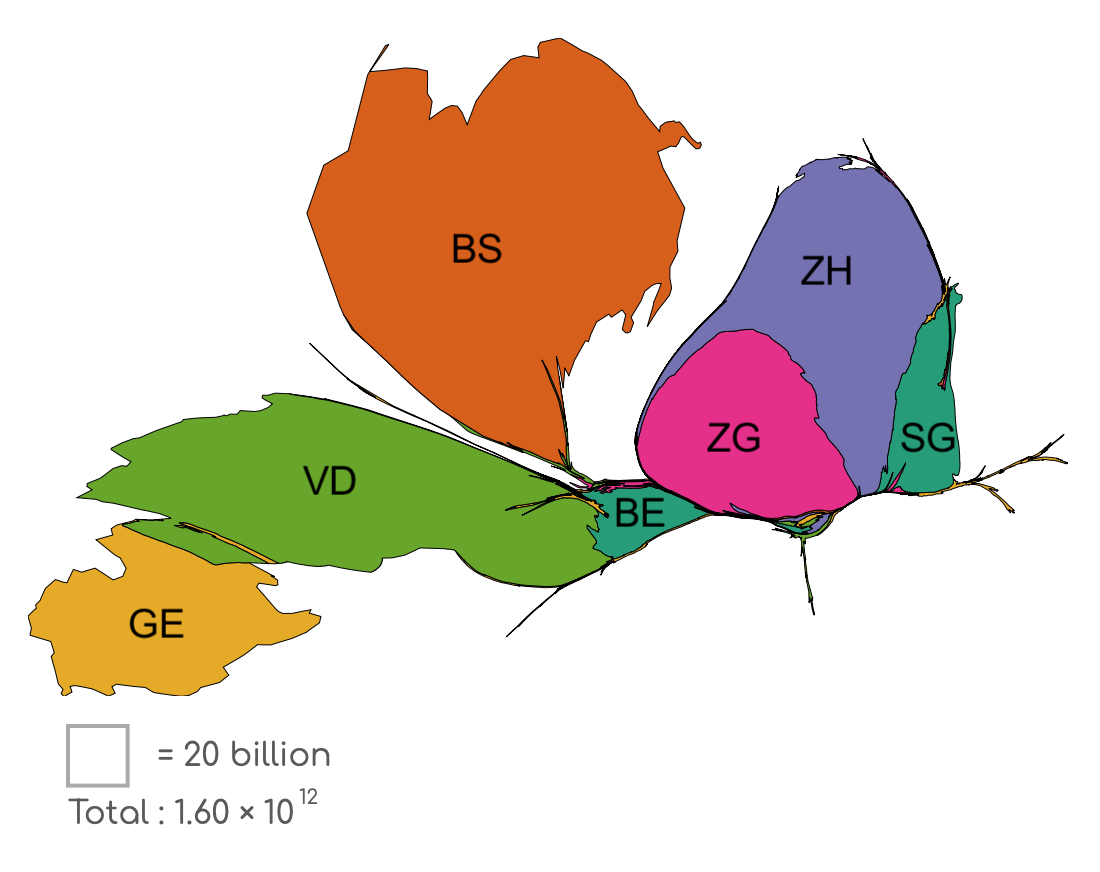
Market capitalisation of SMI index firms by canton of incorporation as of September 2022

As of end of September 2026, the following 20 stocks make up the SMI index.

The rank is based on free-float capitalization as of 23 June 2025. The first ten weights are given as of 25 April 2026. The other weights are given as of 23 March 2020. The latest update following the ordinary review was implemented in September 2026, when Sandoz and Galderma replaced Swisscom and Kühne + Nagel

Rank	Name	Sector	Ticker	Canton	Weighting in %
1	Novartis International AG	Health care	NOVN	Basel	17
2	Roche Holding AG	Health care	ROP	Basel	17
3	Nestlé SA	Retail staples	NESN	Vaud	15
4	ABB Ltd	Industrials	ABBN	Zurich	9
5	UBS Group AG	Financials	UBSG	Zurich/Basel	8
6	Compagnie Financière Richemont SA	Retail discretionary	CFR	Geneva	7
7	Zurich Insurance Group AG	Financials	ZURN	Zurich	6
8	Holcim Limited	Materials	HOLN	St. Gallen	3
9	Swiss Reinsurance Company Ltd	Financials	SREN	Zurich	3
10	Lonza Group AG	Healthcare	LONN	Basel	3
11	Sandoz	Healthcare	SDZ	Basel	
12	Givaudan SA	Materials	GIVN	Geneva	3
13	Alcon Inc	Health care	ALC	Fribourg	3
14	Sika AG	Materials	SIKA	Zug	3
15	Amrize AG	Materials	AMRZ	Zug	3
16	Swiss Life Holding AG	Financials	SLHN	Zurich	1
17	Galderma	Healthcare	GALD	Zug	
18	Geberit AG	Industrials	GEBN	St. Gallen	2
19	Partners Group Holding AG	Financials	PGHN	Zug	2
20	Logitech International SA	Information technology	LOGN	Vaud	1

== SMI family ==
SMI is also the name of a family of indices encompassing the SMI itself, but also the SMI MID with the next 30 large-caps (2) and mid-caps (28), and the SMI Expanded with all 50 shares.

The indices are available in several variations. For example, the SMI, which is a price index, also exists as a performance index, the SMI Cum Dividend (SMIC), which takes into account dividend distributions.

== History ==
History of index constituents
Date	Event
June 2007	The ranking as of 30 June 2007 (according to average capitalization and the turnover achieved during one year, i.e. from 1 July 2006 through 30 June 2007) determined which companies would remain within the SMI after the number of issues was changed to 20. On 5 July 2007, SWX announced that Ciba Specialty Chemicals, Lonza Group, Givaudan, SGS and one of the two classes of shares of Swatch Group would leave the SMI as of 24 September 2007 leaving 20 securities in the index.
September 2009	Nobel Biocare and Bâloise replaced by Lonza Group and SGS.
June 2010	Swiss Life replaced by Transocean.
September 2011	Lonza Group replaced by Givaudan.
June 2012	Synthes replaced by Geberit following the merger with Johnson & Johnson.
January 2016	Transocean replaced by Swiss Life.
May 2017	Actelion replaced by Lonza Group after Actelion's purchase by Johnson & Johnson. In the same month, Sika AG replaced Syngenta after its purchase by ChemChina.
June 2018	Sika announced a 1:60 stock split. Before this change, it was the SMI constituent with the highest price per share.
April 2019	Julius Bär replaced by Alcon after a spin-off (5:1) from Novartis.
September 2020	Adecco replaced by Partners Group after the ordinary index review.
May 2021	LafargeHolcim renamed to Holcim.
September 2021	Swatch Group was replaced with Logitech.
September 2022	SGS SA was replaced with Sonova.
June 2023	Credit Suisse Group was replaced with Kuehne + Nagel on 12/13 June 2023.
June 2025	Amrize was spun-off from Holcim on 23 June 2025. Amrize was kept in the Index for two more month before a final decision was taken. This handling was chosen, because the date of the spin-off was too close to the deadline of the annual index review. As a result of this, the index contained 21 instead of 20 constituents for that period of time.
September 2025	Sonova is removed from SMI. The number of components is back to 20.
September 2026	Swisscom and Kühne+Nagel left the SMI on September 21, 2026. They were replaced with Galderma and Sandoz.

=== Historical values ===
The following table shows the annual development of the Swiss Market Index since 1988.

Year	Closing level	Change in Index	
Year	Closing level	(Points)	(%)
1988	1,435.40		
1989	1,778.10	342.70	23.87
1990	1,383.10	−395.00	−22.21
1991	1,670.10	287.00	20.75
1992	2,105.40	435.30	26.06
1993	2,956.70	851.30	40.43
1994	2,629.30	−327.40	−11.07
1995	3,299.20	669.90	25.48
1996	3,942.20	643.00	19.49
1997	6,265.50	2,323.30	58.93
1998	7,160.70	895.20	14.29
1999	7,570.10	409.40	5.72
2000	8,135.37	565.27	7.47
2001	6,417.84	−1,717.53	−21.11
2002	4,630.75	−1,787.09	−27.85
2003	5,487.81	857.06	18.51
2004	5,693.17	205.36	3.74
2005	7,583.93	1,890.76	33.21
2006	8,785.74	1,201.81	15.85
2007	8,484.46	−301.28	−3.43
2008	5,534.53	−2,949.93	−34.77
2009	6,545.91	1,011.38	18.27
2010	6,436.04	−109.87	−1.68
2011	5,936.23	−499.81	−7.77
2012	6,822.44	886.21	14.93
2013	8,202.98	1,380.54	20.24
2014	8,983.37	780.39	9.51
2015	8,818.09	−165.28	−1.84
2016	8,219.87	−598.22	−6.78
2017	9,381.87	1,162.00	14.14
2018	8,429.30	−952.57	−10.2
2019	10,616.94	2,187.64	25.95
2020	10,703.51	86.57	0.82
2021	12,875.66	2,172.15	20.29
2022	10,729.40	−2,146.26	−16.67
2023	11,137.79	408.39	3.81
2024	11,600.90	463.11	4.16
2025	13,267.48	1,666.58	14.37

=== Milestones ===
The following table shows historic milestones of the Swiss Market Index. Latest seen values are not final: parentheses indicate that the value can be seen again while the bull market persists; italic indicates that the value will be seen again if we reenter a bear market (markets drop by 20%); Other values may be seen again in case of a crash (assuming a threshold of -50%).

To keep the scale logarithmic, it uses increments similar to exchange ticks: 1 between 5 and 10, 2 between 10 and 20, 5 between 20 and 50, 10 between 50 and 100, etc.

(Closing price)	Value	First seen	Latest seen
Calibration	1,500.00	30 June 1988	2 February 1991
Record low	1,279.00	14 January 1991	
Milestone	1,600.00	2 November 1988	24 December 1991
Milestone	1,800.00	2 August 1989	6 October 1992
Milestone	2,000.00	14 December 1992	14 December 1992
Milestone	2,500.00	5 October 1993	30 March 1995
Milestone	3,000.00	5 January 1994	25 September 1995
Milestone	3,500.00	7 March 1996	2 August 1996
Milestone	4,000.00	16 January 1997	14 March 2003
Milestone	4,500.00	17 February 1997	10 March 2009
Milestone	5,000.00	5 May 1997	11 August 2011
Milestone	6,000.00	8 July 1997	29 June 2012
Milestone	7,000.00	25 February 1998	3 January 2013
Milestone	8,000.00	1 July 1998	9 December 2016
Milestone	9,000.00	12 January 2007	30 March 2020
Milestone	10,000.00	2 July 2019	3 November 2020
Milestone	12,000.00	17 June 2021	(29 September 2025)
Milestone	14,000.00	27 February 2026	(13 October 2026)
Maximum close	14,633.70	10 August 2026	(10 August 2026)
Record high	14,669.51	11 August 2026	
