= Pribor =

Pribor may refer to:

- Příbor, a town in the Czech Republic
- Pribor-ZB, a Russian assault rifle
- PRIBOR (rate), Prague Interbank Offered Rate, a reference rate quoted in CZK
