= SPI Extra =

Swiss stock index

- Foundation: 29 April 2004
- Operator: SIX Swiss Exchange
- Exchanges: SIX Swiss Exchange
- Trading symbol: SPIEX
- Constituents: 196 (as of April 18, 2019)
- Type: Mid-cap and small-cap
- Market cap: CHF 408 billion (full, end 2017)
- Weighting method: Market-value-weighted, free-float-adjusted
- Related indices: SMI, SPI, SPI 20
- Website: https://www.six-group.com/en/market-data/indices/equity-indices/spi-extra.html
- ISIN: CH0017810976
- Reuters: .SPIEX
- Bloomberg: SPIEX:IND

The SPI Extra is a stock index which tracks mid-cap and small-cap companies primarily listed in Switzerland. The index is calculated by SIX Swiss Exchange.

It includes all the shares from the Swiss Performance Index (SPI) that are not included in the Swiss Market Index (SMI). It is therefore often used in investment portfolios such as exchange-traded funds (ETFs), as a small-cap and mid-cap benchmark that complements the SMI.

The SPI Extra was introduced on 29 April 2004, computed back to 3 January 1996 with a baseline value of 1000 points as of 31 December 1999.

== Constituents ==
The index contains all the companies that are in the Swiss Performance Index (SPI), but not among the 20 blue chips that are in the Swiss Market Index (SMI), or equivalently the SPI 20.

While the SPI Extra overlaps with the SPI Mid+Small, it does not fully coincide because the SMI criteria are not only based on market capitalisation, but also on liquidity.

== Tickers ==
The following are the tickers for the SPI Extra total return, which takes dividends into account. There is also a version of the SPI Extra as a price index.

- SIX Swiss Exchange: SPIEX
- Swiss Valoren number: 1781097

== See also ==
- Swiss Market Index
- Swiss Performance Index
