= Adval Tech Holding =

Swiss company

Adval Tech Holding AG
- Company type: Public
- Traded as: SSE: ADVN:SW
- Industry: Automotive
- Founded: 1924
- Headquarters: Niederwangen, Switzerland
- Key people: Rene Rothen (CEO) Markus Reber (CFO)
- Revenue: 178.9 Mio. CHF (2019)
- Number of employees: 1,179 (4 April 2020)
- Website: www.advaltech.com/en

Adval Tech Holding is a Swiss company based in the canton of Bern, Switzerland. As of December 2020, it is trading with a ticker symbol "ADVN:SW". It functions primarily in the machinery industry for high-volume components manufactured using metal and plastic, primarily for the automotive industry (and related applications). The company covers the entire value chain, including product, prototype, mold, tool development, and component production and assembly. The firm specializes in the production of tools, punching, forming processes, injection molding, assembly line systems, and serial parts.

The company's series-production plastic components are used in cars and other technically demanding applications. The components that are made for cars include airflow elements, airbags, ABS (anti-lock braking system), steering, lighting systems, seat belt buckles, and trim strips. It manufactures components of airflow systems for Audi and air/water separation systems for BMW. The company also produces parts and sub-assemblies containing metal and plastic components, such as door sill plates for BMW vehicles.

The group primarily delivers its plastic components directly to car manufacturers (OEMs) and to first-tier customers who supply the car manufacturers directly. The company acquired Fischer IMF in April 2016. Some of its plastic parts are made for premium sewing machines and sophisticated safety-related components and are produced in large quantities.

== History ==
Adval Tech Holding began in 1997, in Bümpliz-Oberbottigen, Bern. It was founded by Fritz Styner and Rudolf Bienz as a collective company originally called 'Styner + Bienz.' In 1942, the company was converted into an Aktiengesellschaft (stock market company). In 1963, Styner and Bienz relocated to Niederwangen. In 1974, with the addition of 73 employees from AWM, in Muri, Sydney, and Frankfurt, the company entered the field of plastic injection molding technology. In 1985, Styner + Bienz AG became the first company in the Canton of Bern, the first in the industry, and the sixth in Switzerland to be awarded the ISO Certificate Swiss Norm SN-029-100. The company was renamed 'Adval Technology' in 1997 and was listed on the stock exchange in 1998, the same year it conducted its initial public offering (IPO). Shares of Adval Tech Holding AG are traded on the Zurich stock exchange. In August 2010, the injection molding division 'FOBOHA' was sold to the Barnes Group. In March 2014, the Adval Tech Group consolidated all of its global mold construction activities under the brand Adval Tech Foboha. Barnes Group Inc. has entered into a definitive agreement to acquire Adval Tech's molds business (FOBOHA) in July 2016. AWM Adval Tech created tools for manufacturing CDs, DVDs, Blu-rays, CD covers, and automotive parts as a subcontractor of Sika AG for BMW, Honda, and other car manufacturers. Company apprentices learn specialty extrusion blow-molding. The company has employed 1,341 people since Q3 2017 and reported a turnover of 104.2 million Swiss Francs. In 2018, Adval Tech (Thailand) was acquired by Sunningdale Tech, another manufacturer of precision plastic component.
