= Bellevue Group =

Swiss investment management corporation

Bellevue Group AG
- Type: Public
- Traded as: SIX: BBN; SPI component
- ISIN: CH0028422100
- Industry: Investment management
- Founded: 1993; 33 years ago
- Founders: Martin Bisang, Jürg Schäppi, Hans-Jörg Graf, Daniel Schlatter, Dieter Albrecht, Ernst Müller-Möhl
- Headquarters: Zurich, Switzerland
- Area served: Worldwide
- Key people: Veit de Maddalena (CEO and Chairman); Markus Peter (CEO Bellevue Asset Management)
- Products: Investment funds, active ETFs, investment companies as well as institutional mandates; investments in healthcare, small and mid cap entreprises, multi asset and bonds.
- Revenue: ▼CHF 52.6 million (2025)
- Net income: ▼CHF 9.2 million (2025)
- AUM: ▼CHF 5.8 billion (2025)
- Number of employees: approx. 75 (2025)
- Website: www.bellevue.ch

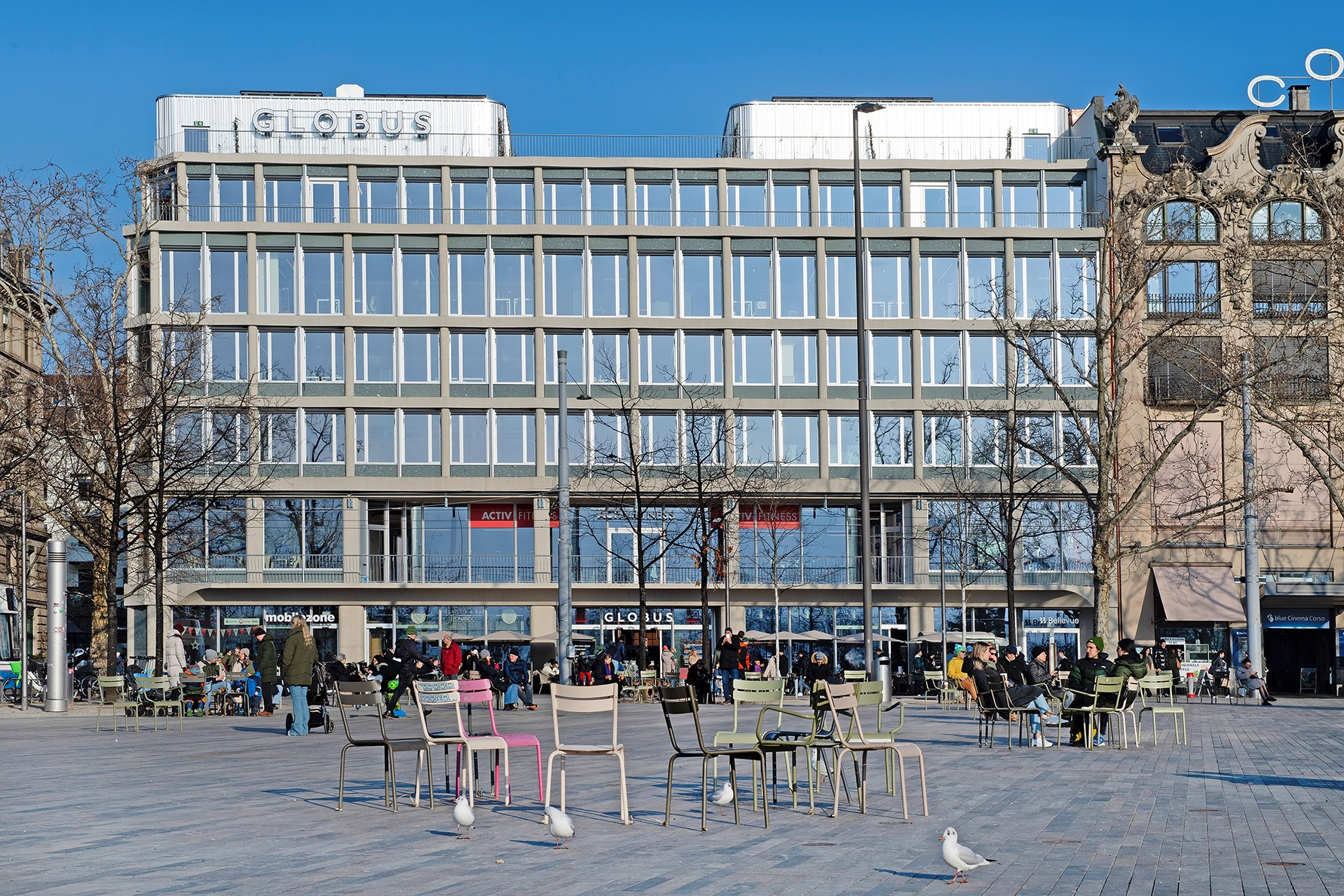
Globus/Bellevue, outside view

Bellevue Group AG, headquartered in Zurich, is a listed investment management corporation based in Switzerland. The company is active in the areas of healthcare investments, investments in small and medium-sized enterprises, as well as multi asset and bonds.

In 2025, the company generated revenue of CHF 52.6 million.

== History ==
=== 1990s and 2000s ===
The group was founded in 1993 by Martin Bisang, Jürg Schäppi, Hans-Jörg Graf, Daniel Schlatter, and Dieter Albrecht. Martin Bisang is still the largest shareholder. Through its subsidiary Bank am Bellevue the group became an important provider in brokerage and block deals on the Swiss market.

Swissfirst AG, which was also founded in 1993, became part of Bellevue Group in December 2006, and later merged into Bellevue Group.

=== 2010s ===
In the first half of the 2010s, Bellevue Group persistently declining profit margins and thus amended their strategy to focus on institutional asset management.

In 2014, Bellevue Group acquired the investment funds Adamant Biomedical Investments from Zurich Cantonal Bank. The merger of Bellevue Asset Management and Adamant took place on 1 January 2015. As a result of the acquisition, the assets under management increased by CHF 831 million to CHF 3.9 billion.

With the acquisition of the asset manager StarCapital AG in 2016, founded in 1996 and based in the Frankfurt am Main area, for an estimated CHF 30 to 40 million, the Bellevue Group aimed to increase its presence in Germany. The acquisition included their product range with managed client assets of around CHF 2.5 billion, consisting of ETF strategies as well as global equity, bond, and asset management funds.

As part of restructuring and refocusing, Bellevue Group discontinued its brokerage and corporate finance activities in 2017.

Effective 1 January 2018, Bellevue Group's subsidiary StarCapital acquired the German investment company Mars Asset Management to expand its business with institutional investors. Together with the client assets managed by Mars Asset Management amounting to €320 million (approximately CHF 370 million), the total managed assets in the area of rule-based strategies rose to over €0.5 billion (CHF 0.47 billion) following the acquisition.

In 2018, the venture capital fund BB Pureos Bioventures was established, which is registered on the Channel Island of Guernsey and focuses on the development of new biological active substances for medicines targeting indications with high medical need such as nucleic acid, cell- and gene therapies.

Also in 2018, Bellevue Group launched the BB Adamant Sustainable Healthcare fund.

In 2019, Bellevue Group sold its stake in the Swiss stock exchange SIX Group to Credit Suisse. In the same year, the Private Market Investments division was established within the group, through which the business areas private equity and private equity funds were added. In this context, the Adbodmer AG, founded in 2001 by Adriana Ospel-Bodmer, the wife of former UBS President Marcel Ospel, became part of the Bellevue Group.

In 2019, the subsidiary Bank am Bellevue was sold to the Luxembourg KBL Group, thereby abandoning the private client business that had been built up in previous years. KBL (Quintet Private Bank since 2020) took over both the staff and the client base, managing assets of CHF 1.6 billion. With the sale, Bellevue became a pure asset manager.

=== 2020s ===
With the onset of the COVID-19 pandemic in spring 2020, there was a heightened demand for investments in the health sector, and the operating result increased by around 15% to CHF 17.5 million in the first half of 2020. In 2021, the company achieved its best-ever results, with a revenue of CHF 140.6 million and a profit of CHF 43.1 million, representing a 93% increase in net profit.

Primarily due to rising interest rates, which also affected small biotech companies in which the Bellevue Group invests, the market conditions weakened again in 2022. In 2023, the company's profit was CHF 8 million, which was primarily attributed to the investment slump in the healthcare sector.

In 2022, Star Capital was integrated into Bellevue Group with Bellevue's German business entirely managed from Frankfurt from this point on. After former owner Peter Huber had left the company, assets under management were considerably reduced. In the same year, Bellevue Group started to expand into Asia.

In November 2023, the Bellevue Group launched the globally oriented equity fund Bellevue Obesity Solutions, consisting of companies in the fields of nutrition and exercise that are addressing obesity; the idea behind the establishment of Bellevue Obesity Solutions is that, due to the growing obesity rates in the global population, this market will gain relevance over the next decade. Additionally, the fund Bellevue AI Health (Lux) was launched, which focuses on generative artificial intelligence (GenAI) and the investment opportunities arising from it in the healthcare sector.

Since June 2025, Veit de Maddalena has been chairman and CEO of Bellevue Group. Previously, Gebhard Giselbrecht served as the CEO. Before that, he worked at Credit Suisse. Giselbrecht had succeeded André Rüegg, who had held the position for eight years prior to him. The position of chief financial officer was filled by Stefano Montalbano, starting in March 2024. As of June 2025, Markus Peter, who previously served as the Head Investments at Bellevue Group from 2009, and as a member of the Group Executive Board since 2024, has been appointed as CEO of Bellevue Asset Management, the largest operational subsidiary of Bellevue Group.

In September 2025, Bellevue launched its first actively managed healthcare ETF, which provides exposure to the healthcare asset class through an exchange-traded investment vehicle.

== Business activities ==
Bellevue Group's main subsidiaries are Bellevue Asset Management and Bellevue Private Markets. Bellevue Group employs around 75 people and has CHF 5.3 billion assets under management (as of 2025).

=== Asset management and investments in the healthcare sector ===
Bellevue Group is among the largest investors in the healthcare segment worldwide. As of 2025, around 88% of clients' assets are in healthcare investments.

One of the Bellevue Asset Management teams manages the BB Biotech investment company. The former investment company BB Medtech, which was converted into an equity fund at the end of September 2009, is also managed by Bellevue Asset Management.

=== Private equity ===
Bellevue Group is also active in alternative investments and private equity.

With the launch of the vehicle Bellevue Entrepreneur Private in early 2021, the group offers a fund for small and medium-sized Swiss companies in the private equity sector, which co-invests alongside entrepreneurial families. The strategy is developed and managed by Bellevue adbodmer. On 30 September 2025, Bellevue Group sold Adbodmer AG as part of a management buyout.

== Stock exchange and shareholders ==
The group is listed on the Swiss Stock Exchange, SIX Swiss Exchange, with a free float of 52.62% (as of March 2026); the share is part of the Swiss Performance Index. As of 2025, the largest shareholder is Martin Bisang (23.91%), while Hansjörg Wyss holds 9.66%, and Jürg and Manuela Schäppi hold 9.18%.
