= Orior (company) =

Swiss business

- ISIN: CH0111677362
- Industry: Food
- Founded: 1852 / 1992
- Key people: Rolf U. Sutter (Chairman of the board); Filip De Spiegeleire (CEO)
- Revenue: 596 mil. CHF (2019)
- Number of employees: 2300 (2019)
- Website: orior.ch

Orior AG (stylized spelling: ORIOR), based in Zurich, is a publicly listed food group specializing in fresh convenience food. It employs around 2,300 people and generated sales of around 596 million Swiss francs in 2019.

== Corporate Structure and Brands ==
Orior is organized into three business segments: Orior Refinement, Orior Convenience and Orior International.

- Orior Refinement consists of the Rapelli, Albert Spiess and Möfag competence centers and includes the brands Rapelli, Ticinella, Albert Spiess, Spiess Gastro and Fürstenländer Spezialitäten. The segment focuses on meat processing and manufactures products such as dry-salted beef, raw ham, cooked ham, salami and Mostbröckli. It has five processing plants and seven finishing plants in the cantons of Graubünden, Ticino and St. Gallen.
- Orior Convenience consists of the competence centers Fredag, Le Patron, Pastinella and Biotta and includes the brands Fredag, Ocean's Best, Nature Gourmet, Noppa's, Le Patron, La Romagnola, Pastinella as well as Biotta, Vivitz, Traktor and C-ICE. The segment produces ready-made meals, pies and terrines, fresh pasta, vegetarian and vegan products or ready-to-cook poultry and meat products, as well as organic vegetable and fruit juices. Seafood is also prepared. The products are manufactured in six processing plants in German-speaking Switzerland.
- Orior International is responsible for export and marketing in the EU neighboring countries. The segment operates several distribution centers in Switzerland and one in Haguenau, France. The segment includes the Belgian competence center Culinor Food Group, which produces fresh ready meals and menu components.
- Orior International includes all activities outside of Switzerland, with this segment being dominated by the Culinor Food Group in Belgium, a manufacturer of fresh ready meals and menu components, and the Biotta subsidiary Gesa. This also includes the export of Swiss products to neighboring countries: Orior/Spiess Europe operates a platform in Haguenau, France, for picking and marketing the group's products outside of Switzerland. In autumn 2018, Orior also took over 35% of the German company Casualfood. In September 2019, the second part of Casualfood was acquired (majority stake of 70%) and therefore a full consolidation as an independent competence center within the International segment.
- The group management and information technology (IT) of the group are organizationally attached to the Orior Corporate division.

== History ==
The company goes back to the Manufacture de cigares Ormond & Cie, founded by Louis Ormond in Vevey in 1852. The company merged in 1930 to form Rinsoz & Ormond and then, through various acquisitions, developed from a cigar manufacturer into a diversified group with activities in the sale of gastronomic products for the hotel and catering industry. In 1992, the company decided to reorient itself and completely withdrew from the tobacco business. At that time, the production and distribution of cigars and tobacco still accounted for 60 percent of the revenue. In March 1992, Pargesa Holding, which until then owned 15 percent of Rinsoz & Ormond, increased its stake to a controlling interest of over 50 percent. As part of the strategic reorientation towards the food sector, Rinsoz & Ormond Holding SA was renamed Orior Holding SA in 1992 and as a result several companies in the premium convenience food sector were integrated into the group.

In 1993, with the takeover of the Rapelli Group, which specializes in the production of Italian sausages, Orior secured an important brand in the food industry. The same year, the pasta manufacturer Trinca was taken over. Further acquisitions followed in the second half of the 1990s, including the traditional fresh pasta manufacturer Traiteur Seiler, with which Orior became an important food company in Switzerland. At the same time, a logistics infrastructure was set up at group level and new production facilities were put into operation. In 1999, the structure of Orior was reorganized into the five groups Rapelli, Fredag, Le Patron, Pastinella and the logistics company Lineafresca.

In 2000, Pargesa Holding increased its stake in the listed Orior Holding to 100 percent, after it had already increased it to over 88 percent. The shares of Orior Holding were subsequently delisted on 18 September 2000. In 2006 Pargesa sold its block of shares to the management and to the Swiss investment company Capvis. This also involved the relocation of the headquarters to Zurich. In 2008, Orior took over the Graubünden company Albert Spiess Holding AG.

Orior has been listed on the stock exchange again since April 2010 (Six Swiss Exchange, ORON, ISIN CH0111677362).

In January 2011, the company Keller SA in Maroggia, Ticino, was bought. The company produces Ticino charcuterie specialties under its own brand Val Mara. In April 2011, the leading Swiss tofu producer Bernatur was also taken over. In March 2012, Orior acquired Möfag - Mösli Fleischwaren AG, a manufacturer of Fürstenland meat specialties such as Mostbröckli or ham. In May 2014, Orior sold the logistics unit Lineafresca to the Murpf Group, which specializes in storage and transport logistics for food. Also in May 2014, Orior took over the organic tofu specialist Noppa AG based in Rüti (ZH). In 2016, ORIOR took over the Belgian Culinor Food Group, manufacturer of ready-made meals and menu components for retail and catering in the Benelux countries. In 2018, the company entered the organic beverage market with the purchase of Thurella (Biotta) and took over 35% of the German company Casualfood, specializing in food service to-go and travel catering. In September 2019, the second tranche of Casualfood was acquired (majority stake of 70%) and therefore a full consolidation as an independent competence center within the International segment.

== Products ==
The company produces charcuterie specialties, fresh pasta, pies and terrines, poultry and pork products, vegetarian and vegan specialties for retail and catering in Switzerland and neighboring countries.
