= Interroll =

Swiss manufacturing company

Interroll Holding AG
- Company type: Public (AG); SIX, INRN
- Industry: Internal Logistics, materials handling, automation
- Founded: Wermelskirchen, Germany (1959)
- Headquarters: Sant' Antonino, Switzerland
- Key people: Markus Asch, CEO, Heinz Hössli CFO
- Revenue: ▲CHF 527.1 million CHF
- Number of employees: 2300 (end of 2024)
- Website: www.interroll.com

The Interroll Worldwide Group is a manufacturer of products for unit-load handling systems, internal logistics and automation.

Established in 1959 and listed on the Swiss Stock Exchange, the Interroll Group employs 2300 people at 36 subsidiaries worldwide and generated 2024 a turnover of 527 million Swiss francs. Headquartered and directed by a strategic holding company located in Sant' Antonino, Ticino in Switzerland, the group operates with two business divisions: "Global Sales & Service" and "Products & Technology".

== History ==
Founded in 1959 by Dieter Specht and Hans vom Stein in Wermelskirchen, Germany.

Between 1968 and 1973 Interroll concluded joint ventures in France, the UK, Denmark, the Benelux countries and Spain. The company developed in the subsequent one as a belt drive used mini-drum motor, ball caster and in cooperation with the Italian Rulmeca, severe conveyor rollers for bulk material applications.

1986 the company concentrated all injection molding production at the newly created site in Sant' Antonio in Switzerland and moved 3 years later the groups headquarter there.

1989 Foundation of the Swiss Holding, establishing the holding.

In 1997, the company went public and floated on the Swiss Stock Exchange

In 2000, the company founder Dieter Specht, gave the Corporate Executive Board to the new CEO Paul Zumbühl. Subsequently, Zumbühl realigned the group strategically and disposed non-core activities.

In 2013, Interoll took over the US-company Portec, Inc. in Cañon City, Colorado.

In 2019, its 18th manufacturing subsidiary started operations in Thailand, which will be followed by a factory in Suzhou, PRC.

In 2021, Ingo Steinkrüger followed Paul Zumbühl as CEO. Zumbühl became Active Chairman of interroll at the same time to ease this transition. Also, Interroll acquired the Austrian company MITmacher GmbH in Linz to create the new Center of Excellence Software & Electronics.

In March 2025, CEO Steinkrüger was replaced by Markus Asch.
