= SPI 20 =

Stock index

- Foundation: July 4, 2017
- Operator: SIX Swiss Exchange
- Exchanges: SIX Swiss Exchange
- Trading symbol: SPI2C
- Constituents: 20
- Type: Large cap
- Market cap: CHF 1,456 billion (full, June 2026)
- Weighting method: Market value-weighted, free-float-adjusted
- Related indices: SMI, SPI, SPI Extra
- ISIN: CH0368313778
- Reuters: .SPI2C
- Bloomberg: SPI2C

The SPI 20 is a capitalization-weighted stock index of large-cap companies listed on the SIX Swiss Exchange.

It is made up of the same components as the Swiss Market Index, except that it does not have any cap on the maximum percentage that a component can have. It was created in 2017, after the largest SMI constituents were capped at 18%. The index was standardized at 1500 points on 30 June 1988 and the history is available back until 29 January 1988.

== Current constituents ==
As of November 7, 2025, the following 20 stocks make up the SPI 20 index.

Rank	Name	Industry	Ticker	Canton	Weighting in %
1	Novartis International AG	Health care	NOVN	Basel	17
2	Roche Holding AG	Health care	ROP	Basel	17
3	Nestlé SA	Retail staples	NESN	Vaud	15
4	ABB Ltd	Electrical equipment	ABBN	Zurich	9
5	UBS Group AG	Financials	UBSG	Zurich/Basel	8
6	Compagnie Financière Richemont SA	Luxury Goods	CFR	Geneva	7
7	Zurich Insurance Group AG	Financials	ZURN	Zurich	6
8	Holcim Limited	Building materials	HOLN	St. Gallen	3
9	Swiss Reinsurance Company Ltd	Financials	SREN	Zurich	3
10	Lonza Group AG	Chemistry	LONN	Basel	3
11	Swisscom AG	Telecommunications	SCMN	Bern	2
12	Givaudan SA	Chemistry	GIVN	Geneva	3
13	Alcon Inc	Health care	ALC	Fribourg	3
14	Sika AG	Chemistry	SIKA	Zug	3
15	Amrize AG	Construction materials	AMRZ	Zug	3
16	Swiss Life Holding AG	Financials	SLHN	Zurich	1
17	Kuehne + Nagel	Logistics	KNIN	Schwyz	1
18	Geberit AG	Sanitary engineering	GEBN	St. Gallen	2
19	Partners Group Holding AG	Financials	PGHN	Zug	2
20	Logitech International SA	Computer hardware and software	LOGN	Vaud	1

== See also ==
- Swiss Market Index
- Swiss Performance Index
- SPI Extra Index
