= Leonteq =

Swiss company

Leonteq AG
- Type: Public limited company
- Traded as: SIX: LEON
- ISIN: CH0190891181
- Industry: financial services
- Founded: 2007 (as EFG Financial Products Holding AG)
- Founder: Jan Schoch; Lukas Ruflin; Michael Hartweg; Sandro Dorigo
- Headquarters: Zürich, Switzerland
- Key people: Christopher Chambers (CoB); Lukas Ruflin(CEO); Marco Amato (CFO)
- Products: structured financial products
- Website: ch.leonteq.com

Leonteq AG is a Swiss company founded in 2007 and headquartered in Zürich. It is specialized in structured financial products and in insurance products in the sector of finance and technology. It is an issuer of its own products, as well as a partner of other finance companies.

Leonteq has subsidiaries in 10 countries and serves more than 50 markets. Leonteq AG is listed on SIX Swiss Exchange, and forms part of the SPI. The company is a member of the Swiss Structured Products Association (SVSP).

== History ==
Founded in November 2007 as EFG Financial Products Holding AG, company's shares were publicly listed in October 2012. In 2013 the company was renamed to Leonteq AG.

== Products and services ==
Leonteq's structured products comprise mostly capital protection, return optimization and participation. Leonteq's insurance products support life insurance providers in the design of retirement plans with guarantees.

== Financial information ==
In the year 2018, the company had 486 full-time equivalents, a transaction volume of 28.8 billion CHF and had an operational profit of 282.4 million CHF.

== Controversies ==
In 2023, the Swiss financial authority FINMA opened proceedings against Leonteq due to alleged involvement with unregulated entities in opaque financial deals. Because of this, in December 2024, FINMA fined Leonteq 9.3 million CHF, and became more involved with Leonteq's governance.

In early 2025, Swiss newspaper reported an alleged conflict of interests concerning Philippe Weber, one of Leonteq's board members, whose law firm, NKF, reportedly earned several millions CHF from Leonteq.
