= Drum motor =

Electromechanical device

A drum motor (or motorised pulley) is a geared motor drive enclosed within a steel shell providing a single component driving pulley for conveyor belts.

Drum Motor with Planetary Gear

Drum Motor With Helical Spur Gear

The drum motor concept was first recorded in 1928, but it was not used until the early 1950s, when it was first produced specifically for conveyor belt applications. The goal was to produce a compact, totally enclosed single component drive unit with high efficiency and lower frictional losses compared to a conventional geared motor. Today, drum motors are may be found in airport check-in conveyors and security machines, supermarket check stands, food processing conveyors and weighing equipment. Reversible drum motors are also used for roller shutter doors.

== Basic design ==
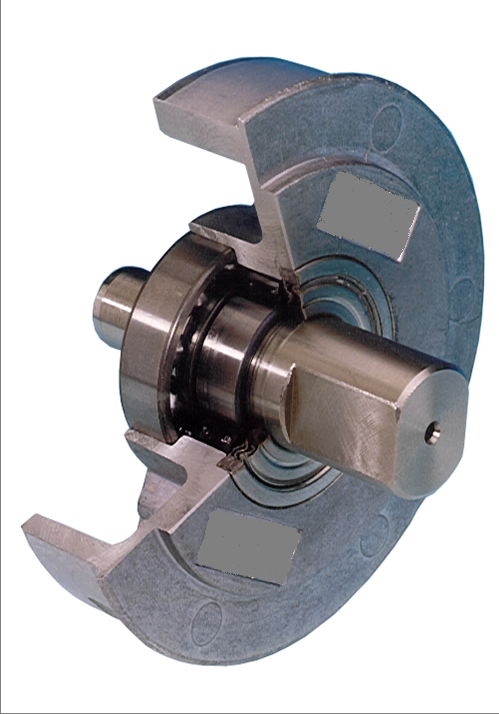
The end housing

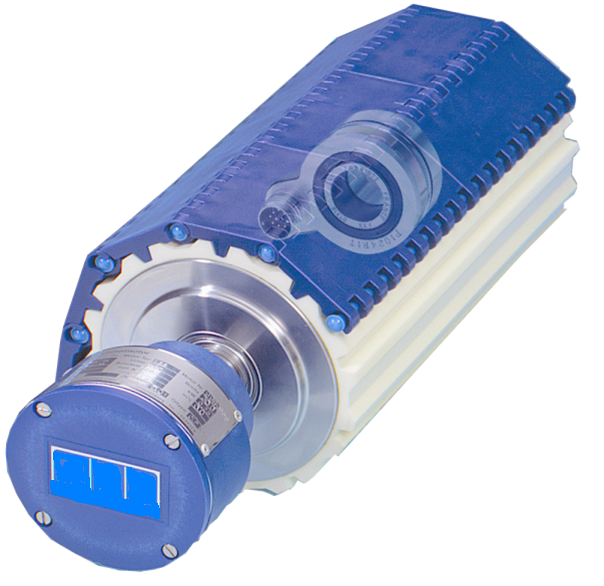
Modern encoder for continuous monitoring of speed, position and direction of rotation

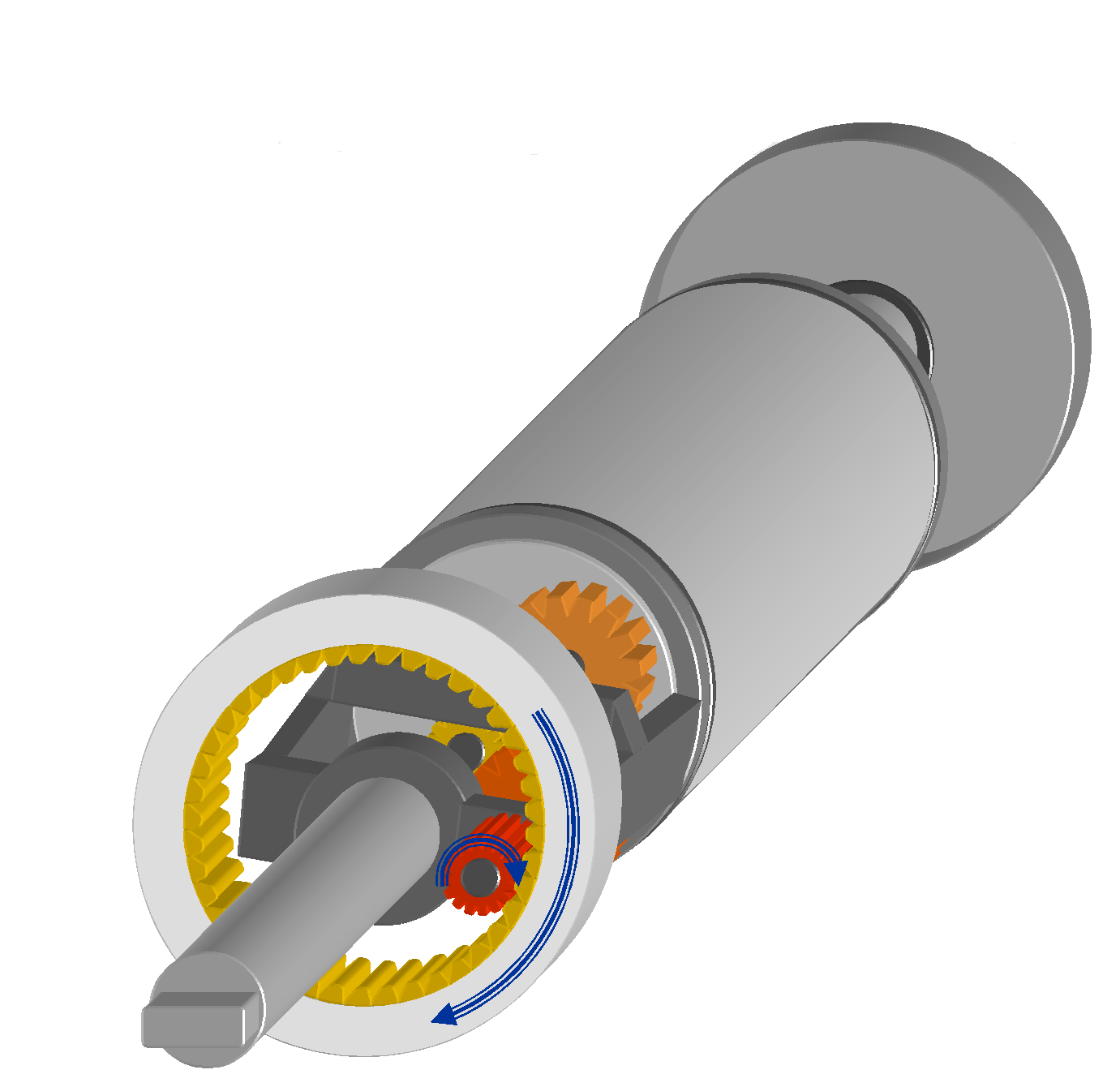
Internal gear

Conveyor belt

The drum motor uses an asynchronous or synchronous electric motor, or hydraulic motor fixed to a stationary shaft. One end of the drum is directly coupled through the motor's rotor pinion to an in-line helical or planetary gearbox which is fixed to the other stationary shaft. The torque is transferred from the motor via the gearbox to the drum shell through a coupling or geared rim attached to the shell or end housing.

== Transmission ==
Because of the in-line transmission arrangement using 2 or 3 stage helical or planetary gears, up to 95% of the output power produced by the motor is typically transmitted to the drum shell. Gears can be made from high-grade steel, sintered metal or polymers.

== Connection and sealing ==
Electrical cable or hydraulic hose connection is made through one of the stationary shafts and is sealed with compression seals. Shaft and connection sealing is made using high-quality materials such as; NBR, FPM or carbon. Lubrication is achieved with oil or grease. Oil also helps to cool the motor, or motors can be air-cooled.

== Drum shell ==
The drum shell (or pulley face) can be produced in aluminum, steel or stainless steel and is normally crowned to facilitate central belt tracking. However, cylindrical shells can be produced and fitted with external sprockets or rotary brushes for special applications. Rubber NBR, PU and other coatings can be applied to the shell to increase friction between the shell and conveyor belt and hot vulcanized or molded profiled lagging can also be applied to drive plastic or steel modular belts.

== Drum shafts ==
The exposed drum shafts are used to install and fix the drum motor into the conveyor frame and do not rotate. The shaft can be a single “through” shaft where the motor and gearbox are assembled on, and fixed to, the shaft with keys or pins. However, this type of drum motor design has a limited maximum radial load due to the bending stresses caused by the normal belt tension of a conveyor and is therefore used mainly for small light duty conveyors and loads. For heavier loads, the most common design is to use two separate shafts, one fixed to the motor housing and one fixed to the gearbox housing where the mass of metal from the motor and gearbox significantly increases the strength of the drum motor allowing much higher payloads and longer conveyor applications. Typically one shaft is short (stub shaft) with a consistent length and the other increases in length according to the drum shell or belt width. Over certain widths, the shaft can be further reinforced to prevent bending under high belt tension.

== Alternative designs ==
Most drum motors can be fitted with backstop non-reversing bearings to prevent belts in inclined conveyors from rolling back or with electro-magnetic brakes for reversible inclined conveyors or for quick stopping. Incremental encoders can also be integrated into the rotor bearings to provide a closed-loop control system for tracking, positioning and accurate tracing of the product on the belt.

== Environment and application ==
Drum motors can be designed to work in temperatures from minus −40 to 50 °C (−40 to 122 °F) and possibly higher. They can withstand high-pressure water jets, chemical cleaning and extremely dusty conditions. They can be installed horizontally or vertically and used in non-conveyor belt applications. Most drum motors have zero or minimal maintenance which means higher productivity and less downtime.

== Hygiene ==
Because the drum motor is totally enclosed, requires no maintenance and has a smooth clean profile without any additional equipment or protrusions. It cannot contaminate food, electrical equipment or pharmaceutical substances. Furthermore, when manufactured in stainless steel, the drum motor can be hygienically cleaned and sanitized regularly using high-pressure water, steam, or chemicals which makes it the most hygienic conveyor drive design to date. Cleaning is much quicker and easier and often reduces operating costs especially in food processing applications

== The components ==
The drum motor needs fewer parts and has low inventory costs as it just consists of the drum motor and two fixing brackets. Unlike conventional drives that require up to 8 or more separate components, most of which have to be purchased from different suppliers or manufacturers especially.
A further advantage is its dimension. The drum motor is often lighter than conventional drives and the weight is evenly distributed within the conveyor frame.
The motor, gearbox and bearings are totally enclosed and sealed in a shell, therefore they are unlikely to fail due to harmful environmental conditions such as water, dust, dirt, grit, chemicals, grease, oil, and so on.

== History ==
In the United States Patent Office can be found an early description of a drum motor from 1932. The application for this "conveyor roller" is from November 1928 and it was applied by the Pittsburgh subsidiary of the German engineering company Schloemann.

20 years later this very early concept was finally conveyed into an industrial drive. In the early 1950s, the Danish inventor and entrepreneur John Kirkegaard designed the first industrial-type drum motor.
