= Metall Zug =

Swiss public company

METALL ZUG AG
- Company type: Public
- Traded as: SIX: METN
- ISIN: CH0039821084
- Founded: 1887
- Headquarters: Zug, Switzerland
- Key people: Martin Wipfli (Chairman); Dr. Jürg Werner (CEO); Daniel Keist (CFO)
- Revenue: 283.4 M CHF
- Number of employees: 983
- Website: www.metallzug.ch/en/

The Metall Zug Group is a Swiss industrial holding company headquartered in Zug, Switzerland which was founded in 1887. Shares of the company are traded on the SIX Swiss Exchange.

== History ==
Metall Zug was founded in 1887 as a metal goods factory. The company specialized in home appliances, releasing the ZUG washing machine in 1915, the first unimatic automatic washing machine in 1950, and tumble dryer in 1959.

In 1993, Metall Zug acquired Belimed, which specializes in products for sterilization. Other competitors in the sterilization field include 3M, Cantel Medical Corporation, and Steris.

In the 1990s, the group of companies took over various companies abroad and in Switzerland via V-Zug AG, which were later merged into the Belimed Group, such as Kleindienst-Belimed in Augsburg (Germany) in 1995 and Avenatech, Inc. in Miami (US) in 1996, 1997 Netzsch Belimed in Waldkraiburg (Germany) and Belimed in Grosuplje (Slovenia) and 1999 the Swiss Sauter Group in Sulgen. In 2000, the market presence of the Belimed Group was unified. This has formed the independent Infection Control business unit since 2005.

In 2007, the group of companies took over FCC Group AG and the operational business of Hildebrand AG, which were integrated into Gehrig Group AG. In 2008, the Schleuniger Group was taken over and the new Wire Processing division formed. In 2010, the groundbreaking ceremony for the Suurstoffi development in Risch/Rotkreuz took place.

As of July 1, 2012, the real estate division was spun off from Metall Zug and has since traded under the name of Zug Estates Holding AG, based in Zug. In 2013, V-ZUG took over Arbonia Forster's (AFG) refrigerator business and founded the subsidiary V-ZUG Kühltechnik AG. With the acquisition of the business of Tianjin Haofeng Electrical Equipment Co., Ltd. Schleuniger took a significant step in the target market of China in 2013.

At the end of 2017, Metall Zug took over 70% of Haag-Streit Holding.

On February 28, 2018, Metall Zug acquired control of Köniz, Switzerland-based Haag Streit Holding AG. Haag Streit comprised more than 20 companies with about 900 employees and develops products for the ophthalmology (diagnostics, surgical microscopy), pulmonology, and optics fields; the company was acquired to form Metall Zug's medical devices division.
