= BB Biotech =

BB Biotech AG
- Company type: Aktiengesellschaft
- Traded as: SIX: BION; FWB: BBZA
- Industry: Investment company
- Founded: 9 November 1993
- Headquarters: Schaffhausen, Switzerland
- Key people: Thomas von Planta (Chairman)
- Products: Investment in biotechnology companies
- Services: Investment company
- Net income: ▲CHF 578 million (2025)
- Total assets: ▲CHF 2,786 billion (2025)
- Website: www.bbbiotech.ch

BB Biotech AG is a Swiss investment company in the field of biotechnology. The company invests mainly in the United States and Western Europe and is managed by Bellevue Asset Management, a division of Bellevue Group, which is listed on the Swiss Stock Exchange.

It is one of the largest investment companies in the biotech sector.

== History ==
BB Biotech was founded as an Aktiengesellschaft on November 9, 1993 in Schaffhausen, Switzerland. The company's shares have been traded on the SIX Swiss Exchange since December 27, 1993, and since December 10, 1997 on the German Deutsche Börse in Frankfurt. BB Biotech was listed on the TecDAX from 2003 to June 2012, and returned to it again between September 2012 and June 2015. The shares were listed on the Italian Nuovo Mercato from October 19, 2000 to September 4, 2023, since September 2005 in the Star segment (TechStar).

== Investment activities ==
=== Investment area ===
As a closed-end fund, with its principal activity of specialised investments in companies operating in the biotech sector, BB Biotech is the oldest established and largest entity of its kind. Primary focus lies on small-to-mid-cap biotech companies headquartered in Western Europe and especially the United States market.

The biotechnology companies in which BB Biotech invests are active, for example, in the fields of oncology, the development of drugs for the treatment of neurological disorders, metabolic diseases, cardiovascular diseases infectious diseases and autoimmune diseases. BB Biotech further concentrates on firms developing therapeutic products involving cell, gene and particularly RNA-based technologies.

In contrast to other biotech specialists or hedge funds, Biotech is a long-only investor and does not need to rely on financial instruments to reduce individual stock or market risk. It targets biotechnology firms which either have previously established products in the marketplace or promising drug candidates in advanced development stages.

=== Companies and core investments ===
While benchmarked against the Nasdaq Biotech index (in CHF), the company uses a bottom-up approach based on the fundamental analysis. Its portfolio comprises around 35 companies.

The portfolio usually includes five to eight core holdings, which account for around 70% of the total value, as well as around two dozen smaller holdings. In addition, up to 10% may be held in non-listed companies (Private equity).

The core investments in the BB Biotech portfolio as of December 31, 2024 included Argenx (13.7%), Ionis Pharmaceuticals (10.0%), Neurocrine Biosciences (9.4%), Intra-Cellular Therapies (7.6%), Revolution Medicines (7.2%), Vertex (7.2%), Alnylam Pharmaceuticals (6.7%) and Incyte (5.6%).

== Company structure ==
The Chairman of the Board of Directors since 2024 is Thomas von Planta; the Vice Chairman is Clive A. Meanwell.

Bellevue Asset Management AG, which belongs to the Swiss Bellevue Group and is based in Zurich, is commissioned with the areas of fundamental analysis, portfolio management, marketing and administration. The investment management team has been headed Christian Koch since 2025.

BB Biotech's equity capital in the individual biotech companies is invested indirectly via the wholly owned subsidiaries Biotech Focus N.V., Biotech Invest N.V., Biotech Target N.V., Biotech Growth N.V., all of which are seated in Curaçao.

== Company figures ==
Company figures are as follows:

(figures in millions CHF)	2025	2024	2023	2022	2021	2020	2019	2018	2017	2016	2015
Profit/(Loss)	578	76	(207)	(358)	(405)	691	677	(471)	688	(802)	653
Net asset value	2,778	2,286	2,323	2,686	3,283	3,888	3,393	2,885	3,539	3,003	3,978
Market capitalization	2,490	1,961	2,368	3,058	4,274	4,108	3,670	3,235	3,576	3,053	3,463
