= Swissquote =

Swiss banking group

Swissquote Group Holding Ltd

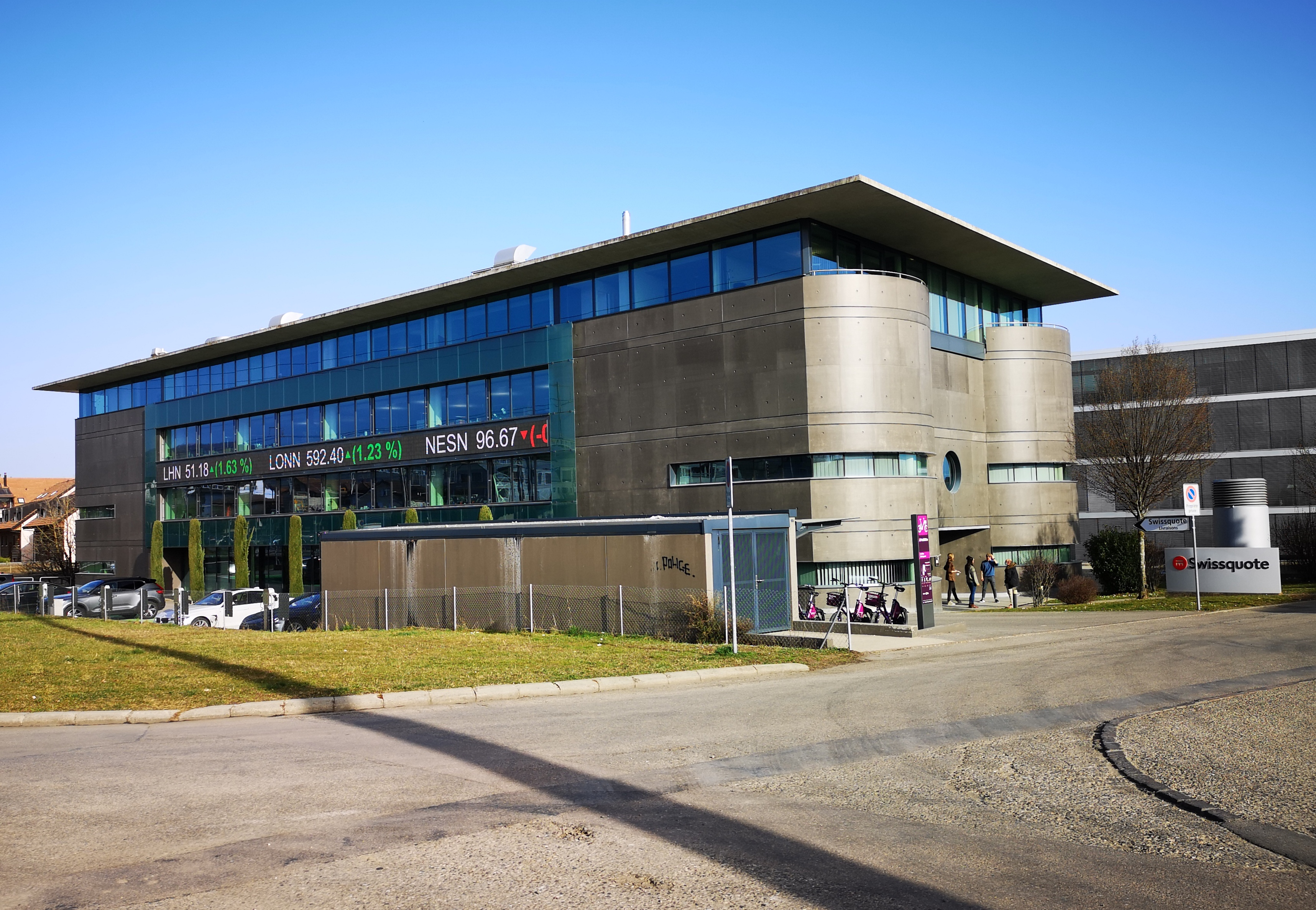
- Headquarters in Gland.
- Type: Public limited company
- Traded as: SIX Swiss Exchange SQN
- ISIN: CH1548235246
- Industry: Banking
- Founded: 2000
- Founder: Marc Bürki and Paolo Buzzi
- Headquarters: Gland, Switzerland
- Key people: Marc Bürki (CEO), Alexandru Craciun (CTO), Morgan Lavanchy (CLO), Gilles Chantrier (CRO), Yvan Cardenas (CFO), Nestor Verrier (COO), Jan De Schepper (CMO), Tara Yip (CPO)
- Products: Trading, Investment and Banking
- Operating income: 724.2 million CHF (2025)
- Net income: 366.4 million CHF (2025)
- Total equity: 1,402.6 million CHF (2025)
- Number of employees: 1,511 (FTE) (June 2026)
- Website: www.swissquote.com

Swissquote Group Holding Ltd is a Swiss banking group specialising in providing online financial services in trading, investment and banking. Its headquarters are in Gland, Switzerland, and its shares have been listed on the SIX Swiss Exchange under the ticker symbol "SQN" since 29 May 2000. On 22 September 2025, Swissquote was added to the SMI MID index.

Swissquote Bank Ltd holds a banking licence issued by the Swiss Financial Market Supervisory Authority (FINMA). As of 31 December 2025, Swissquote reported client assets of CHF 88.7 billion across 1,156,807 accounts and had 1,448 employees.

== History ==
=== 1990–2017 ===
In 1990, Marc Bürki and Paolo Buzzi founded Marvel Communication SA, a company specialising in financial software applications. The company served as the precursor to Swissquote, which was established in 1996 as a financial platform offering private investors real-time access to securities traded on the Swiss exchange.

On 29 May 2000, Swissquote went public on the SIX Swiss Exchange under the symbol SQN. In the same year, the company obtained its banking licence.

In 2009, Swissquote created a chair in quantitative finance at the Swiss Federal Institute of Technology in Lausanne (EPFL). In 2010, it acquired Tradejet AG and ACM Advanced Currency Markets AG, expanding its operations to include online Forex trading. In 2012, Swissquote partnered with Goldman Sachs and UBS to launch the Swiss Derivatives OTC Trading System (Swiss DOTS). Commerzbank joined the platform in 2014, followed by Deutsche Bank in 2015.

In September 2013, Swissquote acquired MIG Bank, a firm specialising in Forex trading.

In January 2015, following the Swiss National Bank's decision to discontinue the minimum exchange rate of 1.20 CHF per euro, Swissquote set aside a reserve of CHF 25 million. On 9 February 2015, Swissquote Financial Services surrendered its Category 3 Investment Services Licence to the Malta Financial Services Authority.

=== 2018 – present ===
In August 2018, Swissquote acquired the Luxembourg-based Internaxx Bank SA to expand its access to the European market. The acquisition was completed in March 2019 following regulatory approval by the European Central Bank and the CSSF in Luxembourg. Internaxx was later renamed Swissquote Bank Europe SA.

In 2019, the company expanded in the Asia-Pacific region by opening Swissquote Singapore Pte. Ltd.

In April 2021, Yuh Ltd. was founded as a joint venture between Swissquote Bank AG and PostFinance AG.

In October 2022, Swissquote launched a crypto exchange, SQX, and gained access to the Dubai Financial Market.

In May 2023, Swissquote partnered with investment firm Stableton and Morningstar Indexes to launch an actively managed certificate (AMC) targeted at Swiss retail investors.

In 2024, Swissquote introduced fractional share trading for retail investors. It also expanded its collaboration with BNP Paribas' Securities Services business.

In July 2025, Swissquote acquired PostFinance's remaining 50% stake, taking full ownership of Yuh. The deal implied a CHF 180 million valuation for Yuh.

== Operations ==
Swissquote provides online banking, investment and trading services, including trading in equities, funds, bonds, warrants, options and futures, as well as foreign exchange and cryptocurrency-related services.

=== Business model ===
Vontobel Equity Research described Swissquote as a scalable platform business with revenue that is more diversified than that of typical online brokers, with major sources including net fee and commission income, net interest income and income from cryptocurrency trading.

Swissquote charges transaction fees on securities trades and quarterly custody fees for private customers, while its spreads are above the industry average on most instruments.

Swissquote reported operating income of CHF 724.2 million and net profit of CHF 366.4 million for 2025, compared with CHF 664.3 million and CHF 294.2 million in 2024. The increase reflected higher trading activity, the full consolidation of Yuh, and growth in fee and trading income, while crypto income remained almost unchanged at CHF 85.7 million despite lower crypto trading volume.

In the first half of 2026, Swissquote reported net revenues of CHF 364.2 million and pre-tax profit of CHF 182.9 million, and lowered its full-year guidance, citing weaker-than-expected cryptocurrency market conditions.

== Sponsorship ==
From January 2015 to May 2021, Swissquote was the official partner of Manchester United.

By 2020, the company became the official sponsor of the Swiss ice Genève-Servette HC (GSHC). In 2021, it became the official sponsor of the ZSC Lions.

In 2021, the company signed a three-year sponsorship deal with UEFA, covering the UEFA Europa League and UEFA Europa Conference League. In February 2024, UEFA announced a renewal of the partnership through 2027.

In December 2024, Swissquote, along with its joint venture Yuh, was announced as an Official National Partner for the UEFA Women's EURO 2025, held in Switzerland.

In January 2026, Yuh announced a four-year agreement to become the main sponsor of BSC Young Boys' men's first team from the 2026/27 season, with Swissquote appearing on the team's shirts in international competitions.

== Regulatory and legal matters ==
In November 2019, Geneva prosecutors opened a money-laundering investigation involving Swissquote over funds linked to the Helin group, a tax-fraud network exposed in the "Dubai Papers" reporting. The funds were held at Swissquote through an omnibus account opened by the Puerto Rico–based Blue Ocean International Bank. Swissquote had previously reported Blue Ocean to the Money Laundering Reporting Office Switzerland (MROS), and the related client accounts were frozen.

In January 2023, the Sanctions Commission of SIX fined Swissquote CHF 75,000 for a negligent breach of ad hoc publicity rules; the company did not appeal.

In July 2025, Bloomberg reported that FINMA had stepped up pressure on Swissquote to curb suspicious activity. CEO Marc Bürki said the regulator had asked for further measures, particularly at Yuh, to reduce the number of reports submitted to MROS. He attributed the increase to external fraud and hacking attempts and said Swissquote's systems had not been compromised.

== See also ==
- List of electronic trading platforms
