= Galenica =

Swiss health care and logistics company

Galenica AG
- Type: Corporation
- Traded as: SIX: GALE; SMI MID component
- ISIN: CH0360674466
- Industry: Pharmacy, Healthcare, Logistics, Computer science (NACE 63), Retail
- Founded: 1927
- Headquarters: Bern, Switzerland
- Key people: Daniela Bosshardt (Chairwoman of the board of directors), Marc Werner (CEO)
- Revenue: CHF 3'301 million (2019)
- Number of employees: 7'071 (2019)
- Website: www.galenica.com/en

Galenica AG, headquartered in Bern, is an internationally active Swiss pharmaceutical and logistics company group, named after the ancient physician Galenus. It dates back to the 1927 Collaboration Pharmaceutique SA, a purchasing center for pharmaceutical products founded by 16 pharmacists in Clarens. This was renamed to Galenica AG in 1932 and moved from Vaud's Le Châtelard to Bern. The Galenica shares are listed on the SIX Swiss Exchange and are a component of the SMI MID index.

== History ==
Galenica was founded in 1827 by 16 West Swiss pharmacists. Their goal was to build a joint purchasing center. In 1938, Galenica laid the foundation for today's information management by establishment of the scientific documentation service, Documentation Galenica. Starting in 1957, the company diversified in its core business through acquisitions and formation of subsidiaries. In the same year, Galenica also laid the first cornerstone in the pharma business with the acquisition of Panpharma AG and the diversification into the sales promotion of parapharmaceutical articles for pharmacies. During the 1970s, other pharmaceutical acquisitions followed, contributing to the development and production of prescription-free drugs (OTC). In 1977, the Codex Galenica, the first complete list of medicines in Switzerland, was published in book form. In 1983, Galenica acquired the Hausmann AG laboratories, which also produced products for the treatment of iron deficiency, which were later marketed under the brand names Venofer and Maltofer.

In 1999, they entered into a strategic partnership with the British-Swiss health group Alliance Boots, which took over 25% of Galenica shares.

In 2000, the founding of GaleniCare laid the cornerstone for the pharma chain and, in 2001, all activities in the area of information processing were transferred to the newly founded company e-mediat. At the beginning of 2008, the acquisition of the Canadian pharmaceutical company Aspreva Pharmaceuticals formed the globally active, fully integrated and specialized Vifor Pharma.

Ownership changed in 2007 for the first time, when a consortium of private equity investor KKR and Stefano Pessina, took over Alliance Boots; the Galenica shares were then held by Alliance Boots Investments 2 GmbH. The second change took place in August 2014 through the acquisition of Alliance Boots by Walgreens, and with the merger to Walgreens Boots Alliance; the Galenica shares remained with KKR and Pessina, and were held by Sprint Investments 2 GmbH. The announced exit of financial investors began in May 2016 with the reduction of the shareholding to a good 20%, and the further complete reduction to be completed by 9 January 2017.

Also in August 2014, Galenica was divided into the Vifor Pharma and Galenica Santé divisions. The long-term objective was the split into two independent companies. Galenica Santé's public offerings (IPO), which will be targeted by the end of 2017, are the main focus here.

Since 7 April 2017, Galenica has been listed on the Swiss stock exchange as an independent company. To confirm the separation of the group into two independent companies, Galenica acquired the US biotech firm Relypsa for over $1.5 billion. Galenica's shares raised $1.9 billion during their debut on the stock market.

In 2019, Galenica purchased the Berner-Bichsel-Group acquiring a majority stake. The group specializes in the manufacture of personalized medicines and homecare of patients.

== Subsidiary company ==
The Swiss pharmacy chains Amavita and Sun Store, among others, are also part of Galenica, which work together with Coop in the joint venture Coop Vitality Pharmacy. In drug production, it is present with its subsidiary Vifor Consumer Health and in logistics with Galexis AG and Alloga AG.

== Documed ==
Logo

Galenica also owns the publishing house Documed, founded in 1976. In 1978, this company started publishing the "Arzneimittelkompendiums", the drug compendium of Switzerland. Swissmedic required every pharmaceutical company to publish their drug information in Documed's compendium, giving Documed a monopoly that they defended with dubious means according to the "Tages-Anzeiger". After repeated criticism about this model, Swissmedic approved in 2008 the creation of the website oddb.org that would publish this information under an open data license. In response, Documed filed a lawsuit to prevent the operation of this site, which was decided by the Federal Administrative Court (Switzerland) in favour of the open source database. As a result, Swissmedic was obliged to offer a way to access drug information free of charge on an Internet platform called AIPS. The tender for the construction and operation of this platform was won by an offer from Documed, which according to the "Tages-Anzeiger" was noticeably below that of the competitors.

== e-mediat ==
Founded in 2001, the company is headquartered in Bern and offers services and databases for Swiss healthcare.

== Investigation of the Competition Commission ==
The Swiss Competition Commission (Weko) opened proceedings against the Galenica subsidiaries Documed, E-Mediat and HCI Solutions, in 2012, since they were accused of abusing their market position. Instead of publishing the drug information, Documed supposedly demanded money from E-Mediat, for the first time the release of the drug stem data in a database that they managed, which is used by hospitals to manage their medicine and settle accounts. Smaller pharmaceutical companies, in particular, were also asked to pay too much money. Several small businesses were threatened to remove their drugs from this database, which would have caused fatal consequences for these companies. After a group of 16 pharmaceutical companies decided to create a platform in cooperation with Just-medical and Ywesee, the companies offered discounts of up to 80 percent, when they signed two to four-year contracts. After the competition commission had initiated an investigation, Documed stopped their threats of removing drugs from the databases.
