= PSP Swiss Property =

Swiss real estate company

- Type: Incorporated company
- Traded as: SIX: PSPN; SMI MID component
- ISIN: CH0018294154
- Founded: 1999
- Headquarters: Zug, Switzerland
- Key people: Giacomo Balzarini (CEO); Luciano Gabriel (Chairman of the Board of Directors)
- Number of employees: Approximately 90 (2017)
- Website: www.psp.info

PSP Swiss Property is one of Switzerland’s largest real estate companies with approximately 160 office and commercial properties as well as several development sites and individual construction projects. Most of the properties are located in the economic centres of Zurich, Geneva, Basel, Bern and Lausanne. The properties are mainly used for offices and retail.

The portfolio’s total value is around 7 billion francs, while rental income adds up to 280 million. The company has 90 employees in Zurich, Geneva and Olten as well as the holding company's domicile in Zug.

PSP Swiss Property was founded by the insurance company Zurich Insurance Group in 1999 and listed at the SIX Swiss Exchange in an initial public offering (IPO) in March 2000. Ever since, the company has focused exclusively, as a pure play real estate company, on commercial properties in Switzerland. PSP Swiss Property pursues a conservative financing policy with an equity ratio exceeding 50% and correspondingly low debt.

Giacomo Balzarini has been the current chief executive officer (CEO) of the company since 1 April 2017.
