= Capvis =

Company

- Company type: Private
- Industry: Private equity
- Predecessor: SBC Equity Partners
- Founded: 1990; 36 years ago
- Headquarters: Baar, Switzerland
- Products: Leveraged buyout, Growth capital
- Total assets: €3.2 billion
- Number of employees: 40+
- Website: www.capvis.com

Capvis is a private equity firm focused on leveraged buyout and growth capital investments in middle-market companies across a range of industries in the Industrial Corridor of Europe (Switzerland, Germany, Italy and the Benelux).

The firm is based in Baar and was founded in 1990. The firm has raised approximately €3.2 billion since inception across three independent funds as well as two predecessor funds.

== History ==
The firm was founded in 1990 as division of Swiss Bank Corporation, one of the constituent pieces that today is part of UBS AG. From 1990 through 1994, the group had approximately CHF 84 million to invest. Beginning in 1995, the group was branded SBC Equity Partners but was still a wholly owned subsidiary of Swiss Bank Corporation. SBC Equity Partners invested from a CHF 117 million vehicle, SBC Equity Partners Fund.

In 1999, shortly after the merger of Swiss Bank Corporation and Union Bank of Switzerland (UBS), the firm began to raise capital from outside investors. This first Capvis fund raised CHF 340 million of investor commitments. While UBS held approximately 40% of the firm's capital, the remainder came from Swiss and international investors.

In 2003, Capvis completed a spinout from UBS, including a buyout of the bank's ownership interest to become a fully independent private equity firm. Subsequently, the firm completed fundraising for a €340 million fund, Capvis II.

In 2008, Capvis raised €600 million for its third independent fund, Capvis III.

In December 2013, Capvis bought swimwear brand Arena for an undisclosed sum.

In 2014, the firm closed Capvis Equity IV for €720 million.

In March 2015, it was reported that Capvis, other European buyout groups Permira and Bridgepoint, and South Korean investment firm NXMH were lining up final bids for fashion group Bogner.

In 2018, Capvis closed middle-market fund Capvis Equity V for €1.2 billion.

In December 2019, Capvis acquires Tertianum Group.
