= VAT Group =

Swiss company

VAT Group AG
- Type: Public limited company
- ISIN: CH0311864901
- Industry: Vacuum technology
- Founded: 1965 in Flawil, St. Gallen, Switzerland
- Headquarters: Haag, Sennwald, Switzerland
- Key people: Urs Gantner (CEO); Dr. Martin Komischke (Chairman of the Board of Directors)
- Revenue: Net sales CHF 942 million (2024); Net profit CHF 212 million (2024)
- Number of employees: 3’202 (FTE, 2024)
- Website: vatgroup.com

VAT Group AG (hereinafter VAT, commercial register entry: VAT Vakuumventile AG) is an internationally active Swiss company for high-performance vacuum valves that has been listed on the SIX Swiss Exchange since 2016. VAT is headquartered in Haag in the canton of St.Gallen (Switzerland). It has representatives in 29 countries and production sites in Haag, Penang (Malaysia) and Arad (Romania).

VAT generated net sales of CHF 942 million in 2024 and an EBITDA margin of 31.2. The most important export regions are Asia with 67%, the USA with 19% and EMEA with 14% of net sales. The VAT Group employed end of 2024 about 3,200 people worldwide (full-time equivalents), about 50% of whom work in Switzerland.

== Business segments ==
VAT reports in two segments: Valves (82% of Group turnover in 2024) and Global Service (18% of Group turnover in 2024).

=== Valves ===
In the Valves segment, VAT acts as a global developer, manufacturer and supplier of vacuum valves for the semiconductor, display, photovoltaic and vacuum coating industries as well as for various industrial and research applications. By end of 2023 VAT held a market share of around 75% in vacuum valves for the production of semiconductors.

Net sales in this segment amounted to CHF 774.7 million in 2024. Around 81,6% of this was attributable to the Semiconductor business unit and 18,4% to the Advanced Industries business unit).

=== Global Service ===
Under Global Service, VAT offers customers local expert support as well as original spare parts, repairs and upgrades. In this segment, VAT generated net sales of CHF 167.5 million in 2024.

== History ==
Siegfried Schertler founded the company in Flawil (St.Gallen, Switzerland) in 1965. In the same year, the company headquarters were relocated to Haag in the St.Gallen Rhine Valley (Switzerland). In the early days, the focus was on research.

In the 1980s, the semiconductor industry was booming with transistors that could be built into a single silicon chip. This required a virtually particle-free production environment, which enabled VAT to enter this market thanks to high production quality. The company entered the semiconductor technology market in 1988.

After the turn of the millennium, the company expanded into the flat panel display and photovoltaic markets. In 2012, VAT launched a comprehensive investment program for a production center in close proximity to the rapidly growing customer base in Asia. The first phase of this program was completed in 2018 and the production facility in Penang (Malaysia) was completed. In 2017, VAT also opened a particle laboratory in San José (USA) that is unique in the industry.

In February 2014, the investment companies Capvis AG and Partners Group Holding AG jointly acquired VAT. VAT was listed on the SIX Swiss Exchange in 2016.

In 2022, VAT's net sales exceeded the CHF 1 billion mark for the first time. In February 2023, CEO Mike Allison (60) announced his resignation at the end of the 2023 financial year. On July 27, 2023, the Board of Directors appointed Urs Gantner (53), previously Executive Vice President of VAT's own Semiconductor Solutions Group, as CEO of VAT from January 1, 2024. Also in 2023 the company invested in both R&D – with the start of the construction of the new Innovation Center in Haag – and further capacity expansions in Malaysia with the completion of Plant 1B in Malaysia.

== Sustainability ==
Based on a first-time materiality assessment, the improved measurement of greenhouse gas emissions and the integration of ESG performance into medium-term strategic and operational planning, VAT published its sustainability targets for the period 2022 to 2030 for the first time in 2022:

- 50% less CO_{2} emissions by 2025 (reference year: 2022)
- 25% women in management positions by 2027
- 23% women in new hires by 2027
- 25% women among new hires by 2030

=== Emissions ===
VAT's greenhouse gas emissions (Scope 1 and 2 according to the GHG Protocol) remained almost static from 12.6 tons in 2022 to 12.8 tons in 2023 in relation to net sales. The company also increased its total use of renewable energy by 6% in 2022 compared to 2021. The consumption of self-generated solar power amounted to 2.18 million kWh (2021: 2.07 kWh).

=== Equal pay and commitment ===
VAT has been Fair-ON-Pay certified since 2021. The analysis showed that there are no statistically significant differences between pay levels for men and women, and as a result, VAT received an upgraded certificate to Fair-ON-Pay Advanced in 2023 In 2022, the company improved its score on the annual employee engagement index for the sixth time in a row, achieving an overall score of 4.09 (2022: 3.94) of a maximum: 5.0.
