= BELIMO Holding =

Swiss HVAC company

BELIMO Holding AG

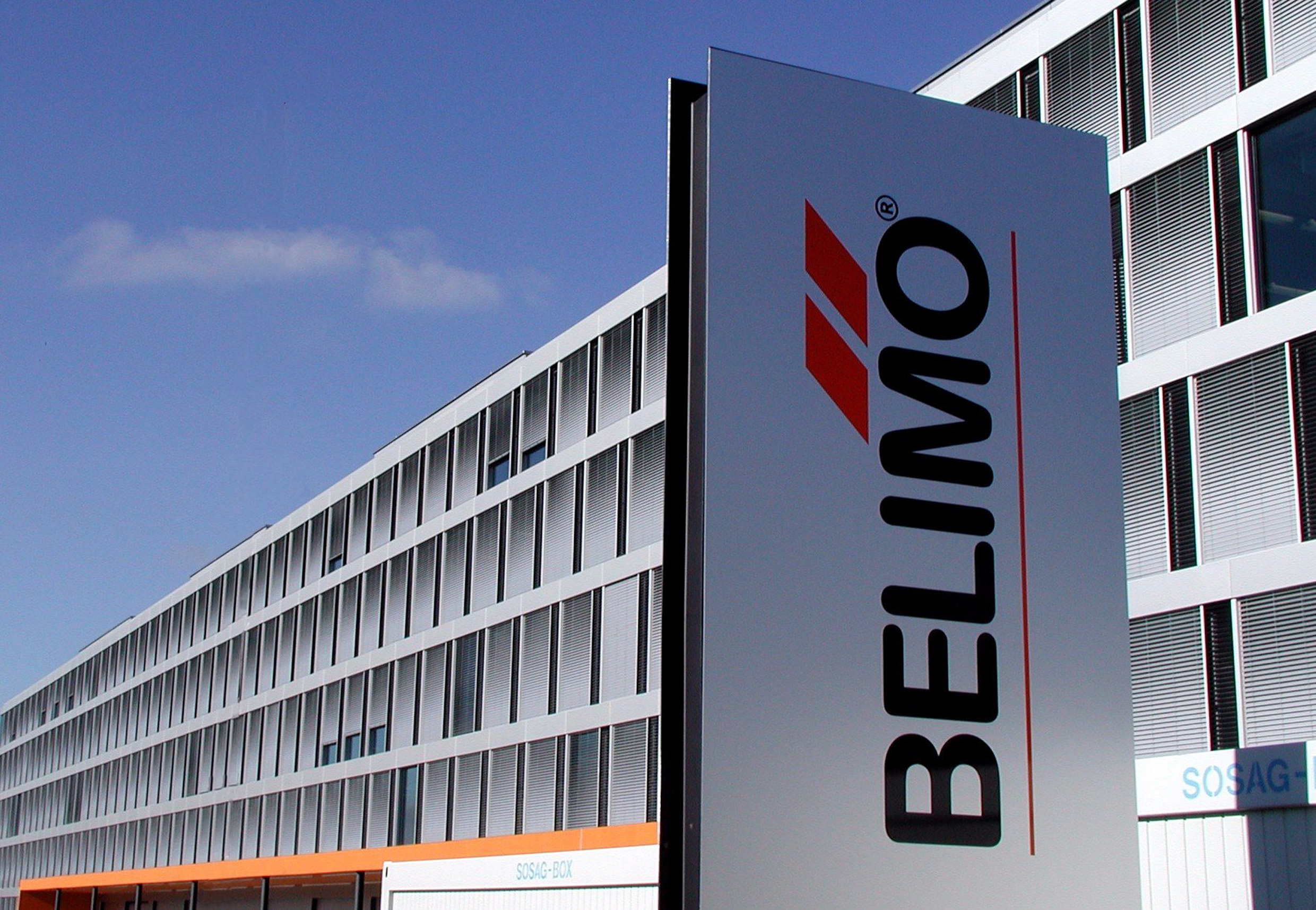
- Belimo Headquarters in Hinwil
- Type: Joint-stock company
- Traded as: SIX: BEAN
- ISIN: CH0001503199
- Industry: HVAC
- Founded: 1975; 51 years ago in Gossau, Zürich
- Headquarters: Hinwil, Switzerland
- Area served: Worldwide
- Key people: Lars van der Haegen (CEO); Patrick Burkhalter (Chairman)
- Products: Actuators for controlling HVAC systems
- Revenue: ▲1.121 million CHF (2025)
- Operating income: ▲CHF 271 million (2025)
- Net income: ▲CHF 182 million (2025)
- Total assets: ▲CHF 879 million (2025)
- Total equity: ▲CHF 622 million (2025)
- Number of employees: 2704 (2025)
- Website: www.belimo.com

BELIMO Holding, is a Swiss group of multinational companies headquartered in Hinwil. The company develops, assembles, tests and markets actuators for controlling heating, ventilation, and air conditioning (HVAC) systems.

== History ==
The company was founded in 1975 as BELIMO Automation AG in the Swiss town of Gossau, Zürich. In January 1975, Walter Burkhalter, Heinz Hutte, Walter Linsi, and Karl Stocker had a meeting where they decided to establish Belimo. The founders had worked together at Magnet Regelsystem GmbH (MRS) in Stuttgart, Germany. BELIMO is an acronym of three German words: "beraten" (advise), "liefern" (deliver) and "montieren" (install). Belimo specialized in actuators, which were delivered for the first time in 1976. A company was opened to conduct sales in Stuttgart in 1977. In 1979, the company's headquarters was moved to Wetzikon, Switzerland.

In the mid-1980s, representatives in England, Finland, Norway, Austria, Denmark, France, Sweden and the Netherlands were appointed as independent distributors. The company expanded with the founding of BELIMO Aircontrols in the United States in 1989.

In the 1990s, various Belimo subsidiaries were founded: Spain in 1990; Austria, Great Britain and France in 1993 and 1994; Canada in 1995; and Hong Kong in 1997. In the meantime, BELIMO Automation AG became a public company in 1995. In 1998, the company's name was changed to BELIMO Holding AG.

International expansion continued into the 2000s, with the establishment of subsidiaries in Singapore, Poland, Sweden, Australia, India and China.

In November 2002, the company moved into its new manufacturing and administration building to Hinwil, consolidating all sites in the Zurich Oberland region. At the same time, the headquarters was moved to Hinwil from Wetzikon.

In 2013, Belimo expanded its US site at Danbury, Connecticut, to better serve the American markets. The site is used for manufacturing, logistics and administration.

In 2020, Belimo acquired Montreal-based Opera Electronics Inc., a specialist for gas detectors and sensors to monitor the quality of air.

As of 2021, around 400 employees in Hinwil, the USA, and Hong Kong, have acquired Belimo shares under preferential conditions.

October 1st, 2024, Belimo Automation AG started construction of an additional production and logistics facility of 6'200 m2 in Hinwil.

== Business ==
The company develops, assembles, tests and markets actuators for controlling heating, ventilation, and air conditioning (HVAC) systems. Valve and actuator components are outsourced to suppliers. Actuators and control valves make up the company's core business, and it is considered a global leader in motor control for HVAC. R&D expenditure is 7 percent of sales. Newer products have integrated sensors and control electronics using ASICs. In addition, products can be connected to the internet for collection of data and remote control since 2017.

Belimo employs more than 2,700 people and generated sales of 1.121 million Swiss Francs in 2025. Recent sales increases are partly due to deliveries of products to hyperscale computer centers in the USA and Asia. The company has been listed on the Swiss stock exchange since 1995 with the code BEAN.
