= Schindler Group =

Swiss manufacturer of escalators and elevators

Schindler Holding Ltd.

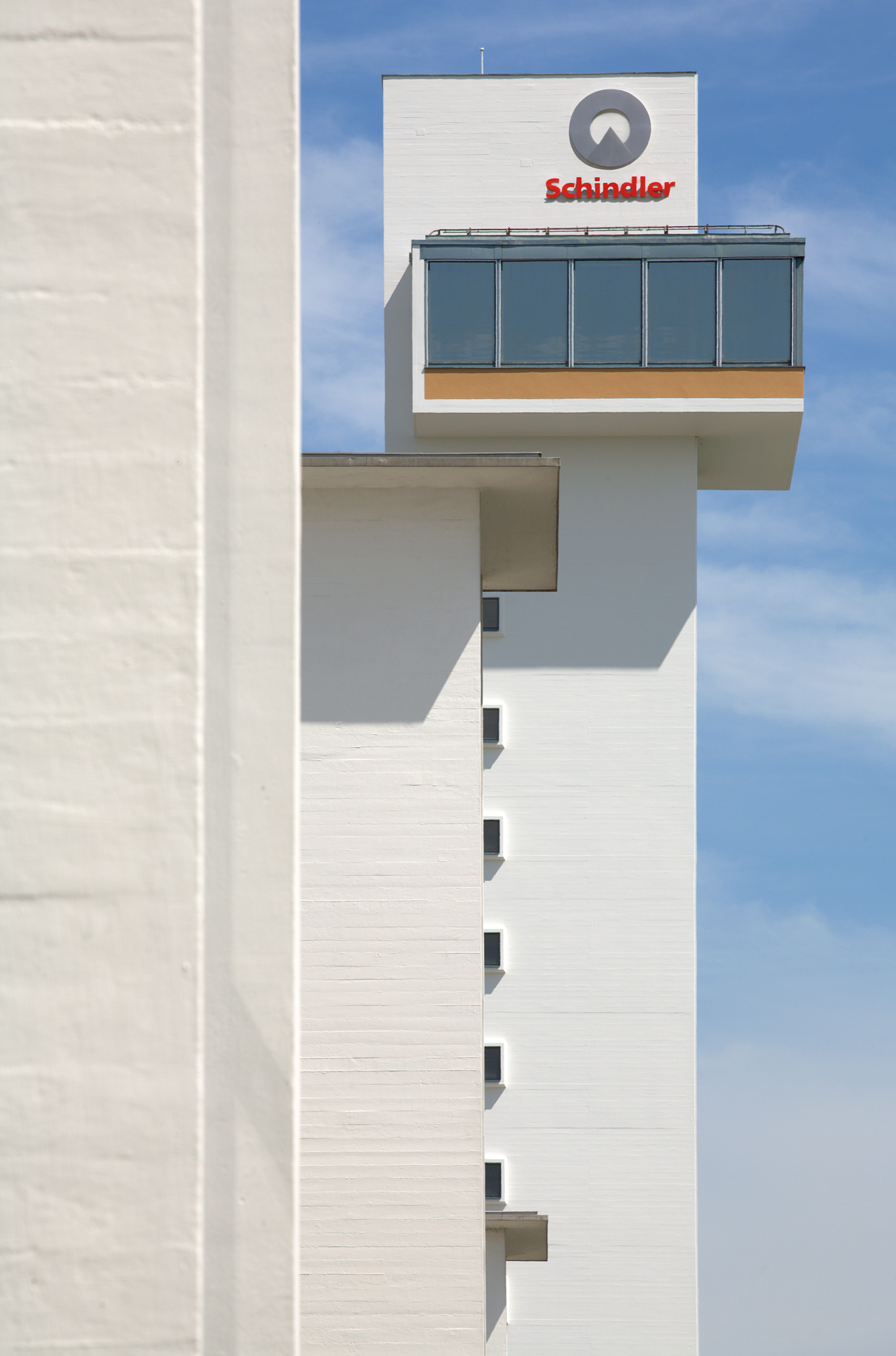
- Schindler Test Tower at the Head Office in Ebikon, Switzerland
- Native name: German: Schindler Holding AG; French and Italian: Schindler Holding S.A.
- Company type: Public
- Traded as: SIX: SCHN; SIX: SCHP; SMI MID components
- Industry: Vertical transportation
- Founded: 1874; 152 years ago
- Founders: Robert Schindler; Eduard Villiger
- Headquarters: Ebikon, Canton of Lucerne, Switzerland
- Area served: Worldwide (Except Japan and Russia, Belarus because of the Minato Ward 2006 elevator accident and the Boycott of Russia and Belarus)
- Key people: Paolo Compagna (CEO)
- Products: Elevators, Escalators, Moving walkways
- Revenue: ▲SFr 10.95 billion (2025)
- Operating income: ▲SFr 1.31 billion (2025)
- Net income: ▲SFr 1.07 billion (2025)
- Total assets: ▲SFr 11.72 billion (2025)
- Total equity: ▲SFr 5.15 billion (2025)
- Number of employees: 67,381 (December 2025)
- Subsidiaries: Atlas Schindler Brasil, Villarta Brasil: Schindler Elevator Ltd. (Note: German: Schindler Aufzüge AG, French: Ascenseur Schindler SA); Schindler Elevator Corporation
- Website: group.schindler.com

Schindler Holding Ltd. is a Swiss multinational company which manufactures escalators, moving walkways, and elevators worldwide, founded in Switzerland in 1874. Schindler produces, installs, maintains and modernizes lifts and escalators in many types of buildings including residential, commercial and high-rise buildings.

The company is present in over 140 countries and employs more than 66,000 people worldwide. The production facilities are located in Brazil, China, Slovakia, Spain, Switzerland, India and the United States. All operations and subsidiaries of Schindler Group are organised into Schindler Holding Ltd. (German: Schindler Holding AG, French: Schindler Holding S.A.), which is publicly traded on SIX Swiss Exchange.

== History ==
The company was founded in Lucerne, Switzerland in 1874, by Robert Schindler and Eduard Villiger, who established the collective joint partnership Schindler & Villiger. Shortly thereafter, a mechanical engineering workshop was built on an island in the river Reuss in Lucerne for the production of lifting equipment and machines of all types. Starting as an agricultural machinery manufacturer, it began to manufacture elevators at the end of the 19th century.

After 1901, Schindler's nephew, Alfred Schindler, expanded the company and founded the first foreign subsidiary in Berlin in 1906. Schindler produced ammunition during World War I. The company's first escalator was installed in 1936, and in 1937 it established a branch in Brazil. Following World War II Schindler became a global group and diversified its operations, manufacturing construction cranes, engines, pumps and railroad cars. In 1980 it became the first Western company to establish a joint venture with a state-owned enterprise of the People's Republic of China. With the takeover of Atlas in Brazil in 1999, Schindler became a major market player in South America.

Schindler entered the North American elevator market with the purchase of Toledo-based Haughton Elevator Company in 1979—briefly branding their products as Schindler-Haughton. In 1989, the company dramatically increased its presence in the United States after acquiring the Elevator/Escalator division of Westinghouse, one of the largest producers of elevators and escalators at the time. Currently, Schindler Elevator Corporation, the United States operations of Schindler Group, is based in Morristown, New Jersey.

In February 2007, Schindler, along with competitors Otis Elevator Co., ThyssenKrupp, Kone, and Mitsubishi Elevator Europe, were fined by the European Union for participating in a price-fixing cartel. Schindler was fined 144 million euros, or about $189.3 million US dollars.

Since 2011, Schindler have sponsored Solar Impulse, a solar-powered aircraft.

== Incidents ==
- On November 29, 2004, a Schindler elevator in Nagoya descended while the door was still open. Nobody was injured in this incident. A later investigation found that the elevator's firmware "TV60 v1.1" had a bug that opened the door when the elevator started moving.
- On April 22, 2006, three passengers were trapped in an elevator in Hachioji, Tokyo after the elevator's door opened while it was ascending. The elevator had faulty "TV60 v1.0" firmware.
- On June 3, 2006, a Schindler elevator in Minato, Tokyo, started ascending while the door was open. A 16-year-old boy was crushed to death while getting off the elevator with his bicycle. An investigation determined a faulty brake was to blame. When the government investigation team requested Schindler to disclose the information about elevators installed, Schindler declined to comply with the request and investigation claiming that documents contained personal information.
- On June 10, 2006, a Schindler elevator in Urayasu started ascending while the door was open, passed the top floor, and finally stopped in the mechanical shaft. Two people were trapped in the car. The elevator had firmware "80TH v1.4" with faulty codes.
- On October 16, 2007, a 9-year-old boy hit his head against the wall after getting his head stuck between the handrail of a Schindler escalator and an acrylic board in a Seiyu store (a subsidiary of Wal-Mart Stores Inc.) in Hiratsuka, Kanagawa Prefecture. He remained unconscious for three days before regaining consciousness. Later investigation found that escalators were not installed in accordance with the Japanese building code, despite the previous claim from Schindler, which was the maintenance contractor.
- On November 16, 2010, 18 students at the Kashiwa campus of the University of Tokyo fell from the ground floor to the basement floor in a Schindler elevator with the doors still open. One student incurred a minor injury while trying to escape. Schindler determined the cause to be loose brake wires.
- On December 11, 2013, The California Division of Occupational Safety and Health Department announced fines against Schindler for three "serious violations", after one of its elevator mechanics died in June while working on the Levi's Stadium.

== See also ==
- List of elevator manufacturers
- Stadler Rail, purchased Schindler Waggon Altenrhein
