= Straumann =

Dental implants manufacturer

- Company type: Public
- Traded as: SIX: STMN
- Industry: Medical devices
- Founded: 1954
- Headquarters: Basel, Switzerland
- Key people: Gilbert Achermann (Chairman); Guillaume Daniellot (CEO)
- Products: Dental implants, prosthetics, orthodontics, digital dentistry
- Revenue: ▲CHF 2.504 billion (2024)
- Operating income: ▲CHF 0.747 billion (2024)
- Number of employees: 12,000 (2024)
- Website: straumann-group.com

Straumann Group is a Swiss company based in Basel (Switzerland) manufacturing dental implants and specialized in related technologies. The group researches, develops, manufactures and supplies dental implants, instruments, biomaterials, CADCAM prosthetics, digital equipment, software, and clear aligners for applications in replacement, restorative, orthodontic and preventative dentistry.

The Straumann Group also offers services to the dental profession worldwide, including training and education, which is provided in collaboration with the International Team for Implantology (ITI) and the Instituto Latino Americano de Pesquisa e Ensino Odontológico (ILAPEO). Its products and services are available in more than 100 countries through a broad network of distribution subsidiaries and partners.

== Business areas ==
Straumann is active in the business of replacement and restoration of teeth, and prevention of tooth loss. Collaborating with clinics, research institutes and universities since the beginning of the company’s existence, it develops implants, instruments, computer-aided design/manufacturing (CAD/CAM) prosthetics, 3D printing and tissue regeneration products. Straumann also sees advantages in orthodontics, as 30-40% of implant patients need to get their teeth realigned before implant treatment. The company provides training and education for the dental profession around the globe in cooperation with the International Team for Implantology.

== History ==
The history of the Straumann Group has three distinct eras and spans more than half a century. It began in the village of Waldenburg, Switzerland in 1954 with the foundation of a research institute bearing the name of its founder, Dr. Ing. Reinhard Straumann.

=== 1954–1970: Between Watchmaking and Medtech ===
Between 1954 and 1970, the company specialized in alloys used in timing instruments and in materials testing. Among Straumann's renowned inventions in this period were special alloys that are still used in watch springs today. A breakthrough in the use of non-corroding alloys for treating bone fractures prompted Dr. Fritz Straumann to enter the fields of orthopedics and dental implantology, which began the second phase of the company's history.

1954
In the small town of Waldenburg, at the foot of the Swiss Jura, Reinhard Straumann founds the "Dr. Ing. R. Straumann Research Institute AG".

1960
The Swiss Association for the Study of Internal Fixation (AO/ASIF) is looking for a company that is capable of providing materials for internal fixation implants – Dr. H.C. Fritz Straumann, son of the company's founder, gets in touch.

=== 1970–1998: Establishment in Medtech and MBO of Stratec ===
Between 1970 and 1990, Straumann became a leading manufacturer of osteosynthesis implants. A management buy-out of the osteosynthesis division in 1990 led to the creation of Stratec (subsequently Synthes) as a separate company. Thomas Straumann, grandson of the founder, headed the remaining part of the firm, which employed just 25 people focused exclusively on dental implants. 1990 thus marked the beginning of the Straumann Group as it is known today.

1980 Straumann established a partnership with the International Team for Implantology. The 1980s also marked the company's geographic expansion, with subsidiaries in Germany (1980) and the US (1989).

1974
The first dental implants are developed at the Institut Straumann and undergo successful clinical testing at the University of Berne.

1980
Under the aegis of Dr. Fritz Straumann, Waldenburg, and Prof Schroeder, the University of Berne, the International Team for Implantology, the ITI, is founded.

1990
After a management buy-out of the internal fixation division, Thomas Straumann focuses the activities of the Institut Straumann AG on the area of implant dentistry.

=== 1998–present ===
In 1998, Straumann Holding AG became a publicly traded company on the Swiss exchange. Through the acquisition of Kuros Therapeutics (2002) and Biora (2003), Straumann entered the promising field of oral tissue regeneration.

1998
The Straumann Holding AG goes public and is listed on the Swiss stock exchange.

2000
With the opening of the production site in Villeret, located in the Bernese Jura, and the Technology Center in Waldenburg, new dimensions open up for the international Straumann group.

2002
Straumann acquires Kuros Therapeutics AG and extends its activities into the field of biomaterials.

2003
Straumann acquires the Swedish company Biora, a pioneer in the area of biologically based regeneration of dental tissue.

2004
Straumann moves into its new headquarters in Basel.

2011
Investment in Dental Wings, a developer and provider of CADCAM software and scanning technology, based in Canada.

2012
Straumann acquires Neodent from Brazil and extends its activities into the value Market.

2013
Straumann invests in Medentika and Createch – both companies are active in prosthetics.

2016
Straumann acquires Equinox, in the fast-growing value segment in India.

The company also invests in the French implant maker Anthogyr to address the non-premium segment in China.

2017
Straumann took a controlling interest in Medentika.

2018
Straumann invests in Botiss Biomedical and fully acquires Createch. The Group also gains control of T-Plus in Taiwan.

Additionally, the Straumann Group entered the orthodontics field and strengthened its digital capabilities through acquisitions and alliances: full acquisition of Dental Wings; acquisition of ClearCorrect (US-based provider of clear-aligner tooth correction orthodontic devices); investment in Geniova (based in Spain and specialized in developing hybrid aligner orthodontic devices); investment in Rapid Shape (3D-printing systems); increased investment in Rodo Medical; acquisition of Loop Digital Solutions; partnership with 3Shape (scanning and software solutions).

2019
The Group takes over the French implant manufacturer Anthogyr.

== Organization ==
=== Board of directors ===
(as of 2022)

- Gilbert Achermann – Chairman of the Board
- Thomas Straumann
- Marco Gadola – Chair Technology & Innovation Committee
- Juan José Gonzalez
- Petra Rumpf - Chair of the ESG Task Force
- Beat Lüthi – Vice Chairman of the Board, Chair Human Resources & Compensation Committee
- Regula Wallimann – Chair Audit & Risk Committee
- Nadia Tarolli Schmidt

=== Executive Management Board ===
(as of 2022)

- Guillaume Daniellot – Chief Executive Officer
- Wolfgang Becker – Head Distributor & Emerging Markets EMEA
- Peter Hackel – Chief Financial Officer
- Holger Haderer – Head Marketing & Education
- Patrick Kok-Kien Loh – Head Sales Asia/Pacific
- Matthias Schupp – Head Sales Latin America, CEO Neodent
- Dirk Reznik – Head Digital Business Unit
- Camila Finzi – Head Orthodontics Business Unit
- Aurelio Sahagun - Head Sales North America
- Rahma Samow – Head Dental Service Organizations
- Jason Forbes - Chief Consumer Officer
- Sébastien Roche - Chief Operations Officer
- Christian Ullrich - Chief Information Officer

== Production facilities ==
The Group's principal production sites for implant components and instruments are in Brazil, Germany, India, Switzerland and the US, while CADCAM prosthetics are milled in Brazil, China, Germany, Japan and the US. Biomaterials are produced in Sweden, digital equipment in Canada and Germany, and clear aligners in the US.

=== Villeret (Switzerland) ===
All major components of the Straumann Dental Implant System are currently manufactured at Straumann's factory in Villeret, Switzerland. Villeret became operational in 2000. Continued global volume growth made it necessary to expand capacity, and a second production floor was fitted out in 2005. As a result, Villeret now operates two fully independent production lines, one producing surgical products (implants) and the other manufacturing components for the range of implant prosthetics (abutments). Villeret also houses the manufacturing unit for Straumann's third generation implant surface technology SLActive.

=== Andover (USA) ===
The North American headquarters in Andover house Straumann's first manufacturing unit outside Switzerland and produces implant system components and instruments.The 7,400-square-meter (80,000-square-foot) production area complements Straumann's current production unit in Villeret, Switzerland. It is also the home office location for Neodent, the Brazilian value implant Straumann acquired in 2013 as part of its product portfolio.

=== Curitiba (Brazil) ===
Headquarters and production facility of the Neodent non-premium portfolio.

=== Malmö (Sweden) ===
Straumann's production unit in Malmö is devoted primarily to the specialized manufacture of regenerative products.In June 2003 Straumann acquired the Swedish company Biora, which specialized in the manufacture of the protein-based products for tissue regeneration. The manufacture of Emdogain, a protein based gel for use in periodontal disease, is focused in Malmö.

=== Montreal (Canada) ===
Dental Wings headquarters and digital equipment production facility

=== Round Rock (USA) ===
ClearCorrect headquarters and clear aligners production facility

=== CADCAM facilities ===
The sites in Markkleeberg (Germany), Arlington (Texas, USA), Narita (Japan) and Shenzhen (China) host Straumann's centralized CADCAM facilities (a.k.a. etkon) for tooth restoration prosthetics.
