= SGS S.A. =

Swiss quality management company

- Type: Public
- Traded as: SIX: SGSN
- Industry: Quality
- Founded: 1878
- Headquarters: Baar, Switzerland
- Key people: Gilbert Ghostine (Chairman); Géraldine Picaud (CEO)
- Services: Testing, inspection, certification
- Revenue: CHF 6.6 billion (2023)
- Net income: CHF 597 million (2023)
- Total assets: CHF 6.761 billion (end 2023)
- Total equity: CHF 5.28 billion (end 2023)
- Number of employees: 99,600 (2023)
- Website: www.sgs.com

SGS (formerly Société Générale de Surveillance, French for 'general society of surveillance') is a Swiss multinational company headquartered in Baar, which provides inspection, verification, testing and certification services. Its 99,600 employees operate a network of 2,600 offices and laboratories worldwide. It ranked on Forbes Global 2000 in 2015, 2016, 2017, 2020 and 2021.

The core services offered by SGS include the inspection and verification of the quantity, weight and quality of traded goods; the testing of product quality and performance against various health, safety and regulatory standards; and the ascertainment of the conformance of products, systems or services with the requirements of standards set by governments, standardization bodies or SGS customers. (Note: Hermann Simon mentioned this company in his correspondent book as an example of a "Hidden Champion".)

== History ==
International traders in London – including those from France, Germany, the Netherlands, the Baltic, Hungary, the Mediterranean and the United States – founded the London Corn Trade Association in 1878 in order to standardize shipping documents for exporting nations and to clarify procedures and disputes relating to the quality of imported grain.

In the same year, SGS was founded in Rouen, France, by Henri Goldstuck, a young Latvian immigrant who, having seen the opportunities at one of the country's largest ports, began to inspect French grain shipments. With the aid of Captain Maxwell Shafftington, he borrowed money from an Austrian friend to start inspecting the shipments arriving in Rouen as, during transit, losses showed in the volume of grain as a result of shrinkage and theft. The service inspected and verified the quantity and quality of the grain on arrival with the importer.

Business grew rapidly; the two entrepreneurs went into business together in December 1878 and, within a year, had opened offices in Le Havre, Dunkirk and Marseilles.

In 1915, during the First World War, the company moved its headquarters from Paris to Geneva, Switzerland, and on 19 July 1919, the company adopted the name Société Générale de Surveillance.

During the mid-20th century, SGS started offering inspection, testing and verification services across a variety of sectors, including industrial, minerals and oil, gas and chemicals, among others. In 1981, the company went public. It is a component of the SMI MID Index.

== Operations ==
The company works in the following industries: agriculture and food, chemical, construction, consumer goods and retail, energy, finance, industrial manufacturing, life sciences, logistics, mining, oil and gas, public sector and transportation.

In 2004, in collaboration with SGS, the Institut d'Administration des Entreprises ('University Management Schools', abbreviated to IAE) Network developed Qualicert, a tool for evaluating university management training and establishing a new international benchmark. The Qualicert accreditation was approved by the Ministry of Economy and Finance, the Directorate General of Higher Education (DGES) and the Conference of University Presidents (CPU). Focused on continuous quality improvement, Qualicert is now in its sixth revision.

== Awards and recognition ==
- Ranked by Forbes in 2017 as a Top Multinational Performer, and one of the World's Most Innovative Companies.
- Named Professional Services industry leader in the Dow Jones Sustainability Indices World and Europe for six consecutive years between 2014 and 2019, receiving a score of 83/100, in comparison to the sector average of 38/100.
- In 2015, KPMG ranked the company's Code of Integrity in the top ten among Swiss companies. The company also joined RE100, a global group of companies convened by The Climate Group and Carbon Disclosure Project that aims to generate their energy fully from renewable sources.
