= Sika AG =

Specialty chemical company

- Type: Aktiengesellschaft
- Traded as: SIX: SIKA; SMI
- ISIN: CH0418792922
- Industry: Chemical & construction Industry
- Founded: 1910, Switzerland
- Founder: Kaspar Winkler
- Headquarters: Baar (ZG), Switzerland
- Number of locations: Subsidiaries in 103 countries
- Key people: Thomas Hasler (CEO); Thierry F. J. Vanlancker (chairman)
- Products: Concrete admixtures and additives, roofing and flooring systems, adhesives and sealants, waterproofing solutions, mortar products, solutions for engineered refurbishment and the industrial sector
- Revenue: ▼CHF 11.201 billion (2025)
- Net income: ▼CHF 1045 million (2025)
- Number of employees: 33,707 (2025)
- Website: www.sika.com

Sika AG is a Swiss multinational specialty chemical company that supplies to the building and motor vehicle industries, headquartered in Baar, Switzerland. The company develops and produces systems and products for bonding, sealing, damping, reinforcing and protecting. It has 33,700 employees, and subsidiaries in more than 102 countries around the world. It manufactures in over 400 factories.

Sika AG is the legal entity for the holding company, which includes the Sika organizations worldwide, Sika Technology AG and Sika Services AG.

== History ==
1910 - 1950

- 1910: Kaspar Winkler founded Sika under the name Kaspar Winkler & Co, Zurich. Winkler's first inventions were agents to protect and clean granite and a waterproofing agent for mortars. This waterproofing agent named Sika-1 is still sold today in a slightly modified version.
- 1912: Subsidiary founded. In Southern Germany, a subsidiary with its own, smallscale manufacturing facility. By hiring a director for foreign operations who cared about the Sika operations, more subsidiaries were founded in England, Italy and France.
- 1918: The Swiss Federal Railways ran successful trials using Sika to waterproof the tunnels of the Gotthard section. Waterproofing became necessary with the introduction of electric trains. The Swiss National Railways waterproofed 67 tunnels with Sika during the following years, which was Sika's breakthrough, as it represented the first big reference project, a true landmark.
- 1935: Worldwide presence. Before World War II, Fritz Schenker, Winkler's son-in-law, drove forward the expansion in Europe, North and South America and Asia.

1950 - 2000

- 1971: Second generation change. Romuald Burkard took over the leadership of the group of companies which by 1968 had become a single integral corporate structure with Sika Finanz AG as the parent company. Subsequentlly, Sika was listed on the Swiss Stock Exchange.
- 1990: Challenging environment. The 1990s was a challenging decade for Sika. To improve performance, the company withdrew from less lucrative, non-core businesses, such as the building of robots used to restore sewer lines. Sika also abandoned the manufacture of road building products.
- 2000: Core competencies. Sika launched a focused growth strategy and summarizes its core competencies as sealing, bonding, damping, reinforcing and protecting.

2000 - present

- 2010: 100-year anniversary. Worldwide celebrations at all subsidiaries.
- 2018: Sika, the Burkard family and Saint-Gobain signed agreements which terminated and resolved their dispute to the common benefit of all parties involved and that of their respective shareholders and stakeholders.
- 2019: Acquisition of Parex. In May 2019, Sika acquired Parex, a global mortar manufacturer with a focus on tile setting materials and facade renderings.
- 2023: Acquisition of MBCC Group. In May 2023, Sika acquired a global construction chemicals company offering a wide range of products which help enhance efficiency, performance and sustainability in the construction industry. This represents Sika's largest acquisition to date.

== Key data ==
Financial data in billions of CHF
Year	2017	2018	2019	2020	2021	2022	2023	2024	2025
Revenue	6.248	7.085	8.109	7.878	9.252	10.492	11.239	11.763	11.201
Net income	0.649	0.687	0.759	0.825	1.049	1.163	1.063	1.248	1.045
Assets	5.796	6.382	9.960	9.794	10.707	11.319	15.051	15.977	15.148
Employees	18,400						33,547	34,476	33,707

== Brands ==
Besides the brand Sika, more than 900 product brands are in use, including Sikaflex, SikaTack, Sika ViscoCrete, SikaBond, Sikafloor, Sika CarboDur Sikagard, Sika MaxTack, Sikaplan, Sikament, Sikadur, SikaLastic, SikaRoof MTC, Sika Unitherm and Sika Sarnafil.
