= Prague Interbank Offered Rate =

The Prague Interbank Offered Rate (PRIBOR) is the average rate at which banks are willing to lend liquidity on the Czech interbank money market and as such, reflects the price of money on the market.

PRIBOR belongs to the family of IBORs (InterBank Offered Rates) together with other financial benchmarks, e.g. LIBOR in London or EURIBOR in continental Europe.

== History of PRIBOR ==
PRIBOR was created in Czechoslovakia in 1992 when a need for a financial benchmark was recognized and was modeled in the image of major benchmarks that already existed since the 1980s. It was created by the Central Bank of Czechoslovakia, who started collection quotes from reference banks in order to determine PRIBOR. After the split of Czechoslovakia in 1993, the process of calculating PRIBOR was taken over by the newly created Czech National Bank (CNB). CNB was responsible for calculating the rate up to the point, where they handed over the role of calculation agent to Telerate (who was acquired by Reuters in 2005) and the role of administrator to The Financial Markets Association of the Czech Republic (also called Forex Club Czech Republic) around year 2000.

In the middle of year 2017, Czech Financial Benchmark Facility took PRIBOR over from Czech Forex Club. On December 11, 2018 CFBF was authorized as an administrator under the European Benchmark Regulation (BMR), meaning PRIBOR became one of the first benchmarks to be authorized under BMR.

During its existence, PRIBOR was fixed every business day with a single exception in the summer of 2002, when it was not fixed on August 13 and August 14 due to massive flooding that took place in Czechia.

== Definition and the fixing process ==
PRIBOR is defined as follows: "PRIBOR (or Prague Interbank Offered Rate) is the average interest rate at which unsecured CZK funds are offered by Panel Banks in the interbank market, just prior to 11.00am local time." It i fixed every business day according to the rules that are defined in the Code of Conduct and publicly accessible on the administrator's website. Data used to calculate the final rate are supplied daily to the administrator by the so-called "panel banks" (panel is used to designate a group of banks that are compliant with the requirements put forward by BMR and the administrator and who are therefore eligible to contribute to the calculation of the rate). These data consist mostly of prices of the loans made by the panel bank and if those did not take place, it consists of an expert judgement of said prices using knowledge of the underlying markets. There are currently six banks contributing to the calculation of PRIBOR.

== Usage of the rate ==
PRIBOR provides information about the current price of money on the market, which is important information for financial and non-financial corporations as well as for the government, the central bank and for everyone who is interested in either investing or borrowing money. It is used in a wide range of financial instruments, including standard interbank products such as FRAs, Interest Rate Swaps and others.

PRIBOR is often used as a reference rate for mortgages (so-called floating rate), meaning that their price is wholly or partially dependent on the development of PRIBOR (e.g. interest rate of the mortgage is re-fixed every one/two/three months according to the value of PRIBOR)

== Suspected PRIBOR Manipulation ==
On 24 March 2015, Hospodářské noviny revealed PRIBOR was not a market rate or the rate of the real interest rate, but a fictional figure which does not represent current money market trends. Allegations were made that so-called reference banks manipulated the rate for their own gain, and that such changes resulted in greater income from loans.

The Ministry of Finance of the Czech Republic asked the central bank on April 10, 2015 to investigate whether PRIBOR, the main benchmark for the country's money market, had been manipulated to keep interest rates high.

In a letter to bank governor Miroslav Singer, deputy finance minister Martin Pros referred to "unsettling reports concerning PRIBOR rates, of which the most serious ones include concerns of their manipulation".

== European Benchmark Regulation (BMR) ==
The European Regulation 2019/1011, often called European Benchmark Regulation or BMR, was devised to make financial benchmarks and indices more transparent and robust with regards to their methodology, and to unify the rules by which they are governed across the European Union. One of its main goals is to eliminate the risk of potential future manipulation of the rates (as was the case in the LIBOR scandal) and to try to ensure, that the benchmarks reflect the reality of the underlying markets.

According to this regulation, any benchmark that will not have been authorized under BMR before December 31, 2019 could not be used after this date by any institution supervised in the EU.

PRIBOR is one of the first benchmarks in the EU to fulfill the requirements of the Benchmark Regulation and is administered by an administrator authorized under BMR.
