= Telephone numbers in Switzerland =

- Country: Switzerland
- Continent: Europe
- Format: 0xx xxx xx xx
- Country code: 41
- International access: 00
- Long-distance: 0

Telephone numbers in Switzerland are defined and assigned according to the Swiss telephone numbering plan administered by the Swiss Federal Office of Communications. The plan has been changed several times and the most recent reorganization was implemented in March 2002.

== Plan of 2002 ==
The Swiss telephone numbering plan implements the ITU-T recommendation E.164 and is designated E.164/2002, based on its last major revision in 2002. It is a closed numbering plan, which means that all telephone numbers, including the area code, have a fixed number of digits. Swiss area codes are officially termed national destination codes (NDC). A complete telephone number consists of ten digits: 0xx xxx xx xx. Two formats are distinguished: three digits for the NDC and seven digits for the subscriber number, and four digits for the NDC and six digits for the subscriber number. However, a few exceptions exist.

The associated dial plan requires that all numbers, even for local calls, must be dialed with the assigned NDC, in contrast to previous plans. When dialing from within the country, a prefix 0 must be dialed.

The plan was amended a few times, e.g., the transition of numbering zone 01 into 044 and 043.

== National destination code ==
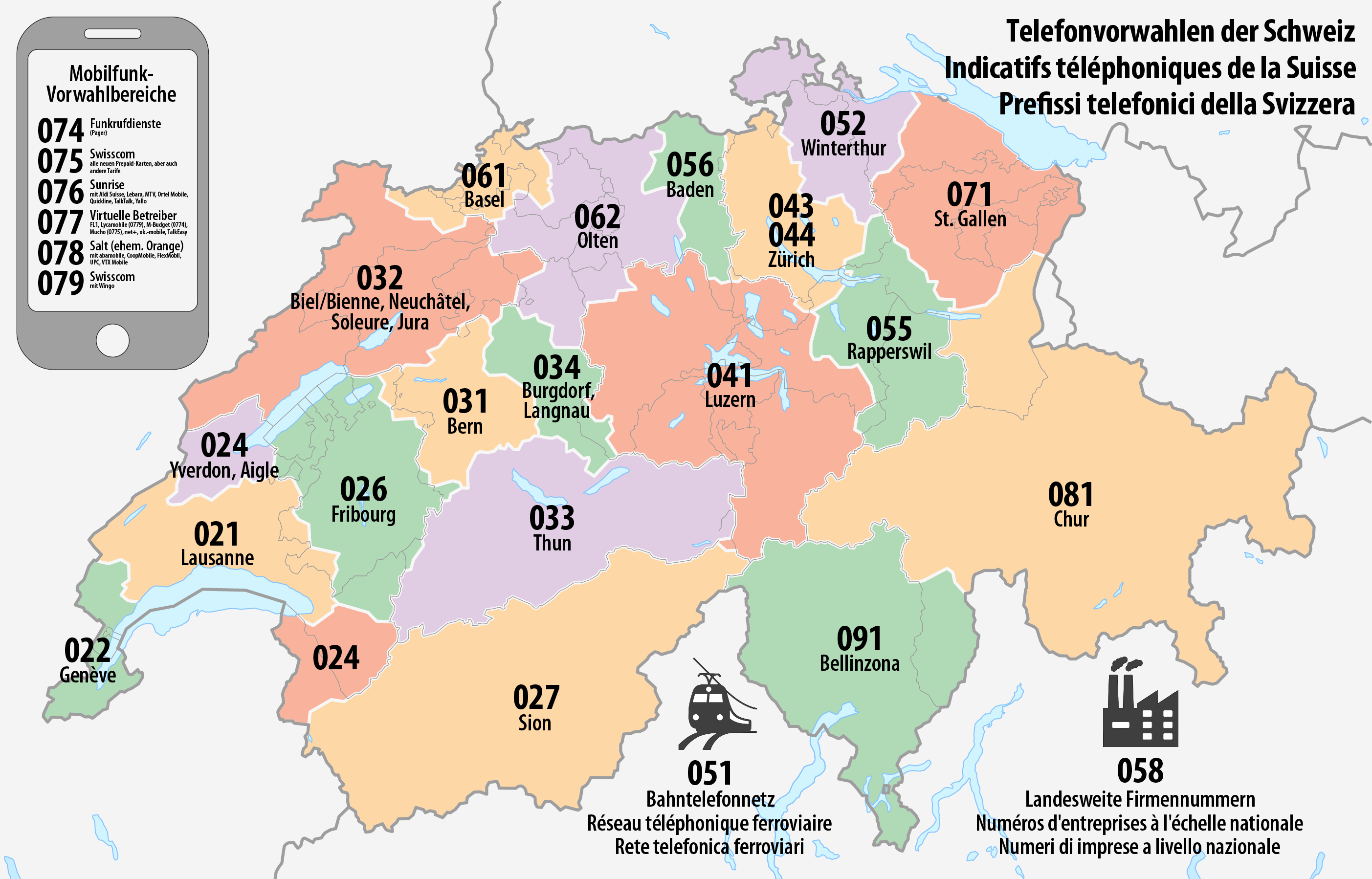

The national destination code (NDC) is the area code for Swiss telephone numbers. Within Switzerland the trunk code 0 must be dialed before the NDC, while it is not needed from international locations.

Telephone numbers are portable between numbering zones (ZN) or between mobile operators, and therefore an NDC does not imply that a caller is actually located in a particular zone or is serviced by any particular mobile operator. For landlines it is now merely an indication of the region where the number was originally attributed to a subscriber.

The national destination codes are the following.

- 21 – ZN Lausanne
- 22 – ZN Geneva
- 24 – ZN Yverdon, Aigle
- 26 – ZN Fribourg
- 27 – ZN Valais/Wallis
- 31 – ZN Bern and surrounding areas.
- 32 – ZN Biel/Bienne, Neuchâtel, Solothurn, Jura
- 33 – ZN Berner Oberland
- 34 – ZN Region Bern-Emme
- 41 – ZN Central Switzerland (Lucerne, Uri, Schwyz, Obwalden, Nidwalden, Zug)
- 43 – ZN Zurich
- 44 – ZN Zurich (formerly 1)
- 51 – rail telecommunication networks (SBB CFF FFS)
- 52 – ZN Winterthur, Schaffhausen
- 55 – ZN Rapperswil
- 56 – ZN Baden, Zurzach
- 58 – business telecommunication networks
- 61 – ZN Region Basel
- 62 – ZN Region Olten–Langenthal (Oberaargau)–Aargau-West
- 71 – ZN Region Eastern Switzerland (St. Gallen, Thurgau, Appenzell Ausserrhoden, Appenzell Innerrhoden)
- 74 – mobile services: paging services
- 75 – mobile services: GSM / UMTS - Swisscom
- 76 – mobile services: GSM / UMTS - Sunrise (with MVNOs: Yallo, TalkTalk, Lebara, MTV Mobile, Aldi)
- 77 – mobile services: GSM / UMTS - various MVNOs: M-Budget (774), Wingo (775), Mucho, Lycamobile (779), ok.-mobile, Tele2
- 78 – mobile services: GSM / UMTS - Salt (with MVNOs: CoopMobile till 2018-12-31, UPC till 2018-12-31)
- 79 – mobile services: GSM / UMTS - Swisscom
- 800 – freephone numbers
- 81 – ZN Chur
- 840 – shared-cost numbers
- 842 – shared-cost numbers
- 844 – shared-cost numbers
- 848 – shared-cost numbers
- 086 – voicemail access (+ 9 digits phone without the initial 0; e.g. +41 086 66 555 44 33 is the voice mail of +41 66 555 44 33)
- 868 – test numbers - Not accessible from abroad
- 869 – VPN access code (+ 3 – 10 digits)
- 878 – personal numbers (UPT)
- 900 – Premium rate service for business, marketing
- 901 – Premium rate service for entertainment,
- 906 – Premium rate service for adult entertainment
- 91 – ZN Ticino, Moesa
- 98 – Inter-network routing numbers - Not accessible from abroad - Non diallable
- 99 – Internal network numbers - Not accessible from abroad - Non diallable

=== Short codes ===
Short dialing codes are assigned for special services or network features.

- 0 – Trunk prefix for calls within Switzerland
- 00 – International call prefix
- 1 – Short numbers, see table below (3, 4 or 5 digit length)
- 107xx – Carrier selection code (+ national or international number)
- 108xx – Carrier selection code (+ national or international number)
- 112 – Police
- 1145 – Directory enquiries for blind/partially sighted (Swisscom)
- 117 – Police
- 118 – Fire brigade
- 140 – Road assistance (TCS)
- 1414 – Air ambulance (REGA - outside Valais)
- 1415 – Air ambulance (Air Glaciers - Valais only)
- 143 – Psychological assistance ("the Helping Hand")
- 144 – Ambulance
- 145 – Poisoning/intoxication emergency
- 147 – Helpline for children
- 1600 – Regional announcement voice mail
- 161 – Speaking clock (Shutdown)
- 163 – Traffic report and travel information
- 164 – Sport news and lottery
- 166 – Railway information
- 176 – Feld Abfrage System
- 187 – Info about snow avalanches
- 188 – Info about exhibitions
- 1802 – Directory enquiries (Tele2, when dialled is rerouted to 1818)
- 1811 – Directory enquiries (Swisscom)
- 1818 – Directory enquiries (Sunrise)
- 1880 – Directory enquiries (Salt)

== Alternate proposed plan ==
Instead of E.164/2002, another more ambitious numbering plan was proposed. In this plan the prefix 0 was discarded, and the area codes were defined differently, with 20 to 49 for geographic areas, 50 to 59 reserved, 60-69 for nationwide numbering, 70-79 for mobile services, 80-89 for shared-cost and toll-free numbers, and 90 for premium-rate services. The plan was not implemented because it required too many phone number and prefix changes, with associated high costs.

== Changes ==
=== After 2002 ===
The area code 01 was replaced with 044 (Zurich)

=== Between 1996 and 2002 (plan 2002) ===
On 29 March 2002 the Swiss dialing plan changed to a closed dialing plan, i.e. the zone prefix become mandatory also for local calls.

- 058 - Corporate access (since 1 June 2000)

=== Until 1996 (plan 1996) ===
The previous plan removed a lot of area prefixes and added the seventh digit in phone numbers (usually a phone number (0cc) yx xx xx became (0dd) zzx xx xx).

- 023 – Short prefix for some French regions
- 025 – Chablais, since 2 November 1996 in 024
- 026 – Martigny, since 2 November 1996 in 027
- 028 – high Valais, since 2 November 1996 in 027
- 029 – Greyerzerland/Pays d'Enhaut, since 2 November 1996 in 026
- 030 – Zweisimmen, since 9 November 1996 in 033
- 035 – Langnau im Emmental, since 9 November 1996 in 034
- 036 – Interlaken, since 9 November 1996 in 033
- 037 – Fribourg, since 2 November 1996 in 026
- 038 – Neuchâtel, since 9 November 1996 in 032
- 039 – La-Chaux-de-Fonds, since 9 November 1996 in 032
- 040 – Telepage Swiss (pager)
- 042 – Zug, since 23 March 1996 in 041
- 043 – Schwyz, since 23 March 1996 in 041
- 044 – Altdorf, since 23 March 1996 in 041
- 045 – Sursee, since 23 March 1996 in 041
- 046 – Toll free, moved into 155 and then into 0800
- 051 – Zürich, moved into 01+7 digits, then replaced with 044
- 053 – Schaffhausen, since 23 March 1996 in 052
- 054 – Frauenfeld, since 23 March 1996 in 052
- 057 – Wohlen, since 23 March 1996 in 056
- 058 – Glarus, since 23 March 1996 in 055
- 059 – Short prefix for German regions, also for parts of France surrounding Geneva and northern Italy
- 061 – Basel
- 062 – Olten
- 063 – Langenthal, withdrawn and integrated into 062 Region Langenthal Oberaargau
- 064 – Aarau withdrawn and integrated into 062 Region Aarau, Fricktal
- 065 – Solothurn, since 9 November 1996 integrated into 032
- 066 – Delémont, since 9 November 1996 integrated into 032
- 067 – Short prefix for German/French regions surrounding Basel and Alsace/South-Baden
- 068 – Short prefix for some German/French surrounding Basel and Alsace/South-Baden
- 069 – Short prefix for some German/French surrounding Basel and Alsace/South-Baden
- 071 – St. Gallen, 30 March 1996
- 072 – Weinfelden, withdrawn and integrated into 071 Region Weinfelden (Thurgau) since 30 March 1996
- 073 – Wil, withdrawn and integrated into 071 Region Wil since 30 March 1996
- 074 – Wattwil, withdrawn and integrated into 071 Region Wattwil (Toggenburg) since 30 March 1996
- 074 – Pager
- 075 – Mobile phone "Natel D" (Swisscom) / previously used for Liechtenstein (Telephone numbers in Liechtenstein) which used to be within the Swiss telephone numbering plan.
- 076 – Mobile phone Sunrise
- 077 – Mobile phone "Natel C"
- 078 – Mobile phone Salt (Orange (telecommunications))
- 079 – Mobile phone "Natel D" (Swisscom)
- 092 – Bellinzona, Misox and Calanca Valley (GR), withdrawn and integrated into 091 (Ticino)
- 093 – Locarno, withdrawn and integrated into 091 (Ticino)
- 094 – Leventina Valley, withdrawn and integrated into 091 (Ticino)

== International borders ==
The German municipality of Büsingen am Hochrhein, an enclave within the canton of Schaffhausen, uses the Swiss telecom network, with numbers having the prefix 052, alongside that of Germany, from which numbers must be dialled in the international format as 004152.

The Italian municipality of Campione d'Italia, an exclave within the Swiss canton of Ticino, uses the Swiss telephone network and is part of the Swiss numbering plan, although some Italian numbers are in use by the municipal council, which use the same +39 031 numbering range as the town of Como.

Liechtenstein previously used the Swiss telephone numbering plan with the area code 075. (This was dialled as +41 75 from outside Switzerland and Liechtenstein). However, on 5 April 1999, it adopted its own international code +423. Consequently, calls from Switzerland now require international dialling, using the 00423 prefix and the seven-digit number.
