= Télésonique =

Télésonique SA
- Company type: Société anonyme
- Industry: Telecommunications
- Founded: 6 May 1998; 28 years ago
- Headquarters: Geneva, Switzerland
- Key people: Adel F. Labib (CEO and co-founder); François Callegaro (VP and co-founder)
- Products: Fixed telephony; Mobile; Internet; VoIP
- Website: www.telesonique.ch

Télésonique is a Swiss telecommunication company founded in 1998 and headquartered in Geneva. For most of its existence, it has been the largest telecom operator in Switzerland that is neither state-owned nor a subsidiary of an international corporation.

== History ==
In 1997, a few months before the liberalization of the Swiss telecom market, Adel F. Labib and François Callegaro, formerly employed at the AT&T international headquarters in Geneve, submitted the request for a telecom license to OFCOM. This made OFCOM change its licensing requirements, as it had required the submissions to include three-year revenue statements, never envisaging the possibility that a local telecom operator could start from zero.

Télésonique SA was founded in August 1998 with a starting capital of one million Swiss francs. As the fourth telecom provider to enter the Swiss market, the company offered fixed telephony services and a Geneve hub for international operators. Télésonique was the first Swiss operator to offer a unique tariff for calls to neighboring countries and the first to introduce electronic invoicing. It also introduced a prepaid offer. A year later, the company attracted national attention when it opposed OFCOM's auction of wireless local loop concessions for the initial price of 6 million francs. However, the Federal Supreme Court of Switzerland rejected the complaint.

Télésonique was the first Swiss telecom operator that worked together with a humanitarian organization. In 2000, five per cent of the revenue of the company's fixed network and prepaid cards went to Médecins Sans Frontières for the project "HELP Africa."

In 2001, as the telecom deregulation bubble burst, Télésonique took over the Swiss subsidiaries of NETnet, Facilicom and One.Tel, as well as NETnet Liechtenstein. It gained more than 100,000 subscribers and a hub in Zürich that was 20 times bigger than the one in Geneva. The Swiss market was dominated by four large telecom operators: majority state-owned Swisscom as the biggest player, followed by Sunrise, Orange and Tele2 as subsidiaries of international companies. Télésonique, the largest independent competitor, was present in western Switzerland and hoping for complete market liberalization.

Its first acquisition outside Switzerland (and Liechtenstein) came in 2005, when Télésonique acquired the assets of Select One, a German Voice over IP provider. It allowed Télésonique to introduce a new service in Switzerland, called Bypass, which offered very low call prices to the users who prefixed the called number with a series of ten digits. It was made possible by "bypassing" the last mile of Swisscom, as well as Swisscom mobile.

The number of Swiss telecoms was further reduced in 2008, when Tele2 was bought by Sunrise. Télésonique opposed the takeover, arguing that it eliminated the only big mobile operator in Switzerland that was not state-owned or had a historical monopoly position.

== Awards ==
Télésonique won the 2003 Ernst & Young Entrepreneur of the Year Award in the startup category.
