= Deutsche Tourenwagen Masters =

German auto racing championship

- Official logo of the DTM
- Category: Touring car racing (2000–2020); Sports car racing (2021–present)
- Country: Europe (6 rounds held in Germany, 1 round held in Austria and 1 round held in the Netherlands in 2025)
- Inaugural season: 2000
- Constructors: Aston Martin; Audi; BMW; Ferrari; Ford; Lamborghini; McLaren; Mercedes-AMG; Porsche
- Tyre suppliers: Pirelli
- Drivers' champion: (Austria) Thomas Preining
- Makes' champion: (Germany) Mercedes-AMG
- Teams' champion: (Germany) Manthey Racing
- Official website: www.dtm.com

The Deutsche Tourenwagen Masters, (Note: lit. 'German Touring Car Masters') commonly abbreviated as the DTM, is a sports car racing series sanctioned by ADAC. The series is based in Germany, with rounds elsewhere in Europe. The series currently races a modified version of Group GT3 grand touring cars, replacing Class 1 Touring Cars in 2021.

From 2000 to 2020, the "new DTM" continued the former Deutsche Tourenwagen Meisterschaft (German Touring Car Championship) and ITC (International Touring Car Championship) which were discontinued after 1996 due to high costs. The series raced prototype silhouette racing cars based on mass-production road cars in the same period.

The second iteration went by the full name during its first five years. Since 2005, all official documents have only referred to the series using the abbreviated name.

== History ==
=== Background ===
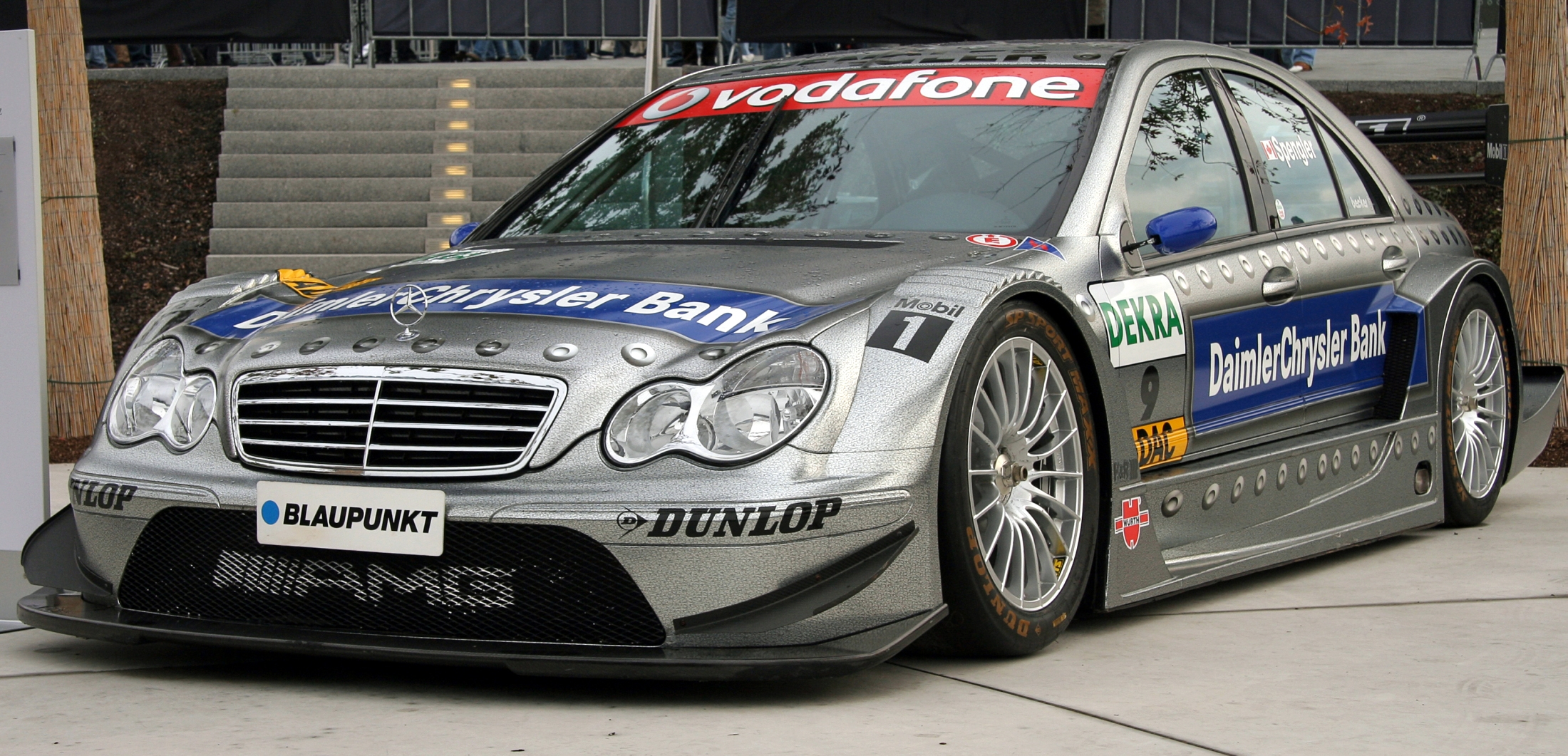
Mercedes-Benz AMG DTM car (2006)

During the ITC era, a large proportion of the revenue generated by the championship went to the FIA, which led to complaints from the teams regarding the small return on their increasingly large investment in the high-tech touring car series. Since 1997, many ideas had been discussed in order to find a compromise for the rules of a new DTM racing series. Opel put the primary emphasis on cost control, Mercedes-Benz supported expensive development in competition, BMW wanted an international series rather than one focused on Germany only, while Audi insisted on allowing their trademark quattro four-wheel drive system (despite running the rear wheel drive Audi R8 in sports car racing).

DTM returned in 2000 as Mercedes and Opel had agreed to use cars that were based on the concept car that was shown by Opel on various occasions (e.g. the 1999 24 Hours Nürburgring where Opel celebrated its 100th anniversary). The series adopted the format of the 1995 championship, with most rounds held in Germany and occasional rounds throughout Europe, but having learnt the lessons of the ITC format, the ITR constantly made efforts to keep costs in the revived series and the championship firmly tied to its German roots. As too many races were initially planned outside Germany, no Championship (Meisterschaft) status was granted by the DMSB, and the DTM initials now stand for Deutsche Tourenwagen Masters (German Touring Car Masters).

Unlike the previous incarnation, which primarily used saloon models like the Mercedes-Benz W201, the new DTM featured only 2-door coupés. Opel used the upcoming Coupé version of the Astra as the concept car, and Mercedes used the CLK model which was already used as the basis for the Mercedes-Benz CLK-GTR GT1-class sports car.

The motorsport arm of the Bavarian tuning company Abt Sportsline was allowed to enter on short notice. Abt used the Audi TT as a basis for a DTM car, as Audi had no suitable 2-door coupé in its model lineup at the time, even though the dimensions of the car did not fit into the rules of the series. This also meant that the 1999 STW-Supertouring-champion Christian Abt could not defend his STW title as this series was also discontinued, with Opel then moving into DTM.

=== 2000–2003 ===
In May 2000, the new DTM started with the traditional Hockenheimring round on the short course. Some cars competing in the race had no or few sponsorship decals. While Opel's cars could match the speed of most Mercedes cars in the 2000 season, the hastily developed Abt-Audi ended up outclassed. As the body shape of the TT had rather poor aerodynamics, Abt was allowed to use a version with a stretched wheelbase and bodyshell in later years. Further dispensation was also granted, such as increased rear wing height, which helped the Abt-Audi TT-R win the DTM championship in 2002 with Laurent Aïello.

In 2002, DTM also introduced the HANS device to increase driver safety and reduce injuries from accidents.

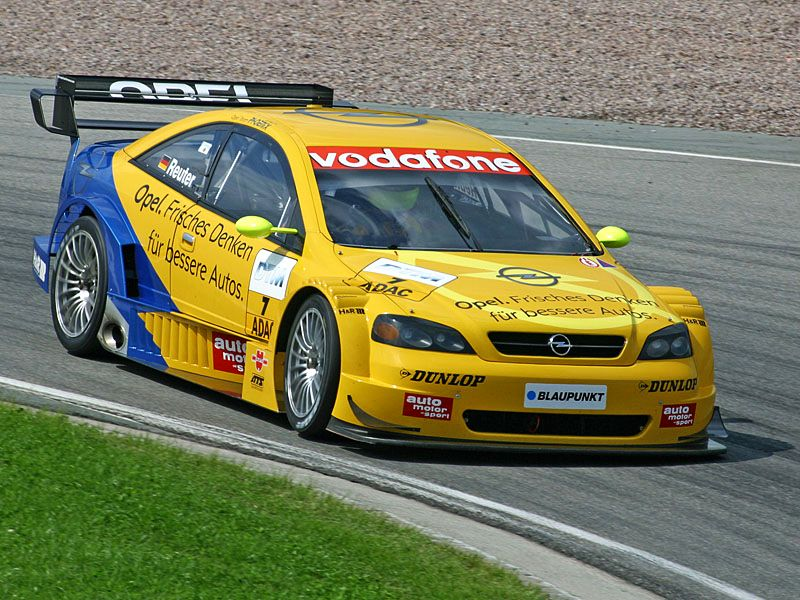
Opel Astra DTM

In 2000, Manuel Reuter came second in the championship. After that year, no Opel driver was among the top three in the overall championship, with few podium finishes and no victories for the disappointing "lightnings". On the other hand, it was Opel team boss Volker Strycek who brought a new highlight to the fans, by racing a modified DTM car on the old version of the Nürburgring in 2002, 20 years after the top classes had moved to the modern Grand Prix track, and ten years after the old DTM stopped racing there. The Opels did not win in many of their race entries in the VLN endurance racing series, as they were mainly testing. Opel won the 2003 Nürburgring 24 Hours against factory efforts by Audi, who also ran a DTM-spec TT and BMW, who ran an ALMS-spec M3.

=== 2004—2006 ===
After their successes with the Audi R8 and the official support of the Abt-TT-Rs at the Nürburgring, Audi finally joined the DTM as a factory entrant in 2004. The three constructors involved decided to switch to D-segment compact executive-based saloon bodies. The road models used as patterns since 2004 are the Audi A4, Opel Vectra GTS and the Mercedes-Benz C-Class. All dimensions, like the wheelbase, are identical in order to provide equal opportunities without the actual design of the road cars having any influence. Audi immediately had success in 2004 with Swedish driver Mattias Ekström, now a long-time veteran of the sport, becoming a DTM series champion for the first time.

The championship suffered a setback in 2004 when long-time entrant Opel decided to pull out of the series at the end of the 2005 season, as part of a large cost-cutting operation in General Motors' European division. Initially, the gap looked set to be filled by MG Rover, however their plans to enter the series were canceled after the company collapsed in April that year. As a result, Audi and Mercedes ended up fielding 10 cars each in 2006, but the television deal with the major German television station ARD required three marques to participate in 2007 in order to continue the broadcast agreement.

=== 2007–2013 ===
The DTM carried on with only two manufacturers in spite of the television agreement requiring three manufacturers to participate in the series. The 2007–2009 seasons were marked by the dominance of Audi. Swede Mattias Ekström won the second of his two titles in 2007, and Timo Scheider took the driver's championship in the following two years. Mercedes-Benz were in the runner-up positions in both 2008 and 2009 (Paul di Resta in 2008 and Gary Paffett in 2009). In 2010, Mercedes finally bridged the gap to Audi, as di Resta won the 2010 championship driving for AMG-Mercedes.

In 2011 and 2012, the DTM held a Race of Champions-style exhibition event in the Munich Olympic Stadium.

In 2012 BMW made a return to the series after a twenty-year absence, and won the drivers, teams, and manufacturers titles. 2012 also marked the return of three-car manufacturers since 2005 season as well as two-door D-segment compact executive coupé style since 2003.

Audi switched from the A4 to the A5 in 2012 and to the RS5 in 2013. In 2013, the Drag Reduction System identical to the system used in Formula One was introduced by ITR to improve racing in DTM.

=== 2014–2020 ===
In 2014, the body shape and aerodynamic pieces of all DTM cars were modified to improve racing. The double-header races (Saturday and Sunday races) were also revived in 2015, thus switching from races with total laps run to timed races. The qualifying format was also reformatted into a single-session timed qualification (similar to the Formula One qualifying format used from 1996 to 2002), but DTM only run a single 20-minute qualifying session for Saturday and Sunday races. Performance weights were also introduced to determine the winning car's weight.

In 2017, the DTM field size was reduced from 24 to 18 cars total to improve quality as well as increasing affordability for its existing manufacturers, while making the series a more attractive proposition for any prospective entrants and manufacturers.

For the 2019 season, turbocharged engines were reintroduced to the series for the first time since 1989 (see article below for full story). Mercedes left the series following the conclusion of the 2018 season, but R-Motorsport joined the series in 2019 to run four Aston Martin-branded cars, although they would withdraw after a single season that did not yield competitive results. The 2019 season also saw the three Super GT GT500 manufacturers – Honda, Lexus and Nissan – each field a guest entry at the final race of the season, before entries from both series would compete at the non-championship Super GT x DTM Dream Race held at Fuji Speedway in Japan.

=== 2021–present ===
The 2021 season switched to a GT3-based regulation, otherwise known as GT Plus, due to the sudden withdrawal of Audi in 2020 which left only BMW with an eligible Class 1 car. In December 2022, the parent body of the DTM, ITR, was dissolved, leaving ADAC to acquire the rights to the championship name. The DTM continued in name-only from 2023 onwards, with completely different organisation and regulations compared with just three years previous.

== International expansion ==
=== DTM–Super GT unification ===
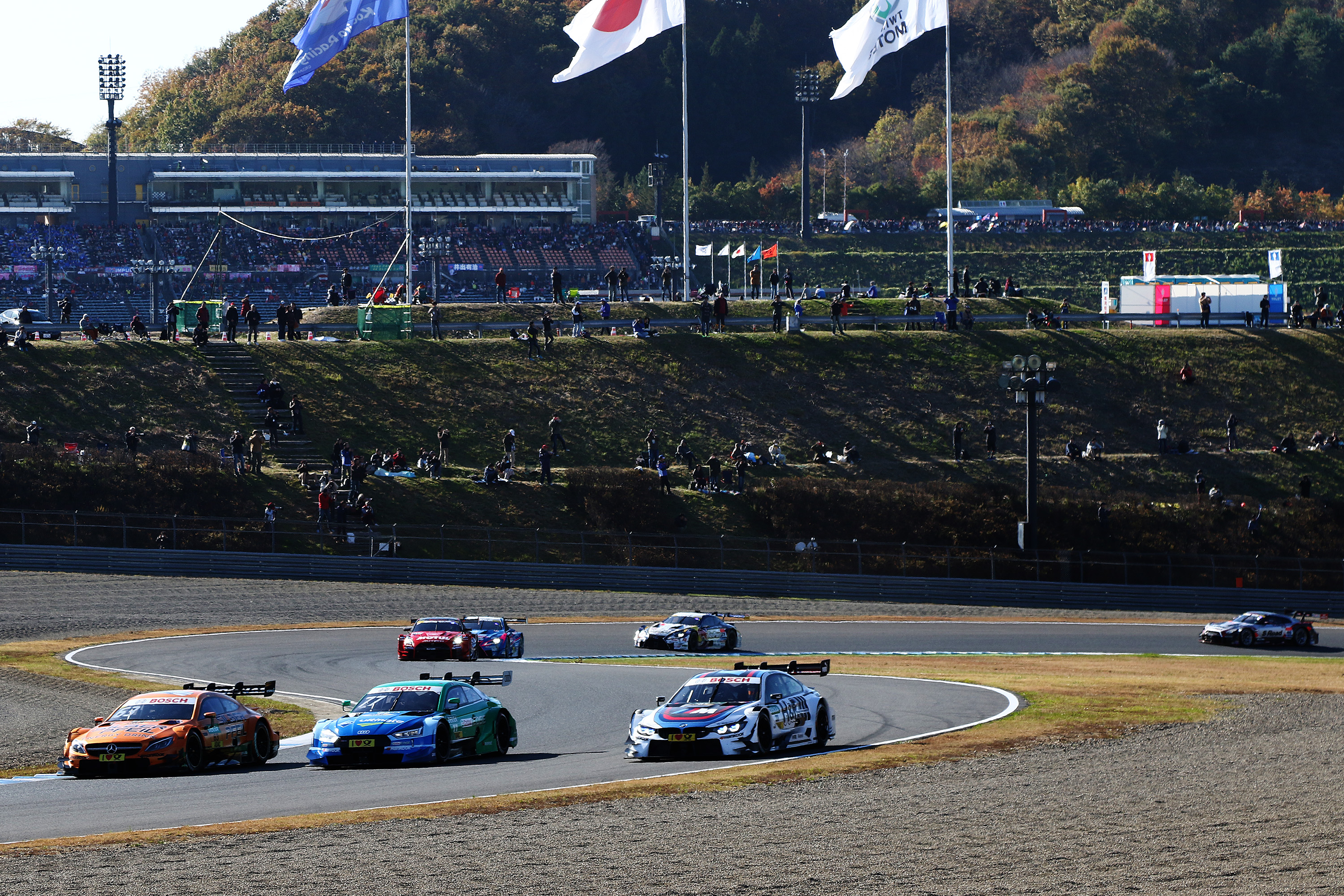
Parade lap featuring DTM race cars before a Super GT race at Twin Ring Motegi in 2017

In March 2010, The GT Association (the governing body of the Super GT series in Japan) initially announced that the ITR were beginning to align the technical regulations with Super GT's GT500 class and NASCAR's Grand American Road Racing Association Grand Touring division to form a new Grand Touring specification. In October 2012, a cooperation agreement between DTM and Super GT was signed in Berlin. The agreement regarding the use of the 'New DTM' regulations by Japan's Super GT began in 2014 and ran for four years. DTM moved away from its previous 4.0-litre V8 specification in favour of 2.0-litre turbos in 2019, which Super GT had implemented in 2014.

=== NASCAR Holdings / IMSA ===
On 27 March 2013, the ITR and NASCAR Holdings road racing division, the International Motor Sports Association announced a North American DTM series that was scheduled to start between 2015 and 2016 based on the 2014 DTM/Class 1 regulations. As of 2019, a North American DTM series has yet to run, despite interest being shown by the North American sanctioning body to run DTM/Class 1, either as a series under IMSA sanction or possible integration into the sports car championship as a potential replacement for the GTLM/GTE class in 2022. The initial 2013 agreement to run a North American DTM Series was signed by IMSA's predecessor, Grand-Am Road Racing and did not take into account the subsequent merger of the sanctioning body with the rival sports car championship American Le Mans Series in 2014 to form the United SportsCar Championship, now known as the IMSA SportsCar Championship. After Class 1 racing in Europe ended entirely in 2020, being replaced by GT3 Specification and GTE Class racing ending globally in 2023 and also being replaced by GT3 Specification, both IMSA and the DTM now use GT3 class racing cars in different states of tune.

== Race format ==
When the DTM series returned, it used a similar format to the final season of the former DTM in 1996: two races of 100 kilometres, with a short break between them. In 2001 and 2002 there was a short race of 35 kilometres as well as a long race of 100 kilometres, which included one pit stop and points scored for the top 10 as in earlier seasons. From 2003 to 2014 there was only one race, which had a distance of about 250 kilometres, and two mandatory pit stops.

For the 2015 season a new race format was introduced. Race weekend consisted of 40-minute (Saturday) and 60-minute (Sunday) races. On Saturday's race a pit stop was optional, while on Sunday's race a pit stop was mandatory and all the four tyres had to be changed. Both races had the same scoring system.

In the 2017 season, both races of the weekend featured the same distance – 55 minutes plus a complete lap, with one race being held on Saturday, the other on Sunday. In both races, the drivers had to pit at least once for a set of fresh tyres. For the 2019 season the time limited race format was abolished and the series reverted to the fixed lap race format that was last used in 2014. However, after the opening round of the 2019 season, the series reverted the 55-minute plus one lap distance format due to issues with television broadcasts running longer than expected. As of 2025, a further change to the race format was made, where both the Saturday and Sunday races are still 55 minutes + 1 Complete lap but the pitstop regulations were changed for there to be 1 mandatory pitstop during a specified pit window during the Saturday race and 2 mandatory pitstops during 2 specified pit windows during the Sunday race.

== DTM drivers ==
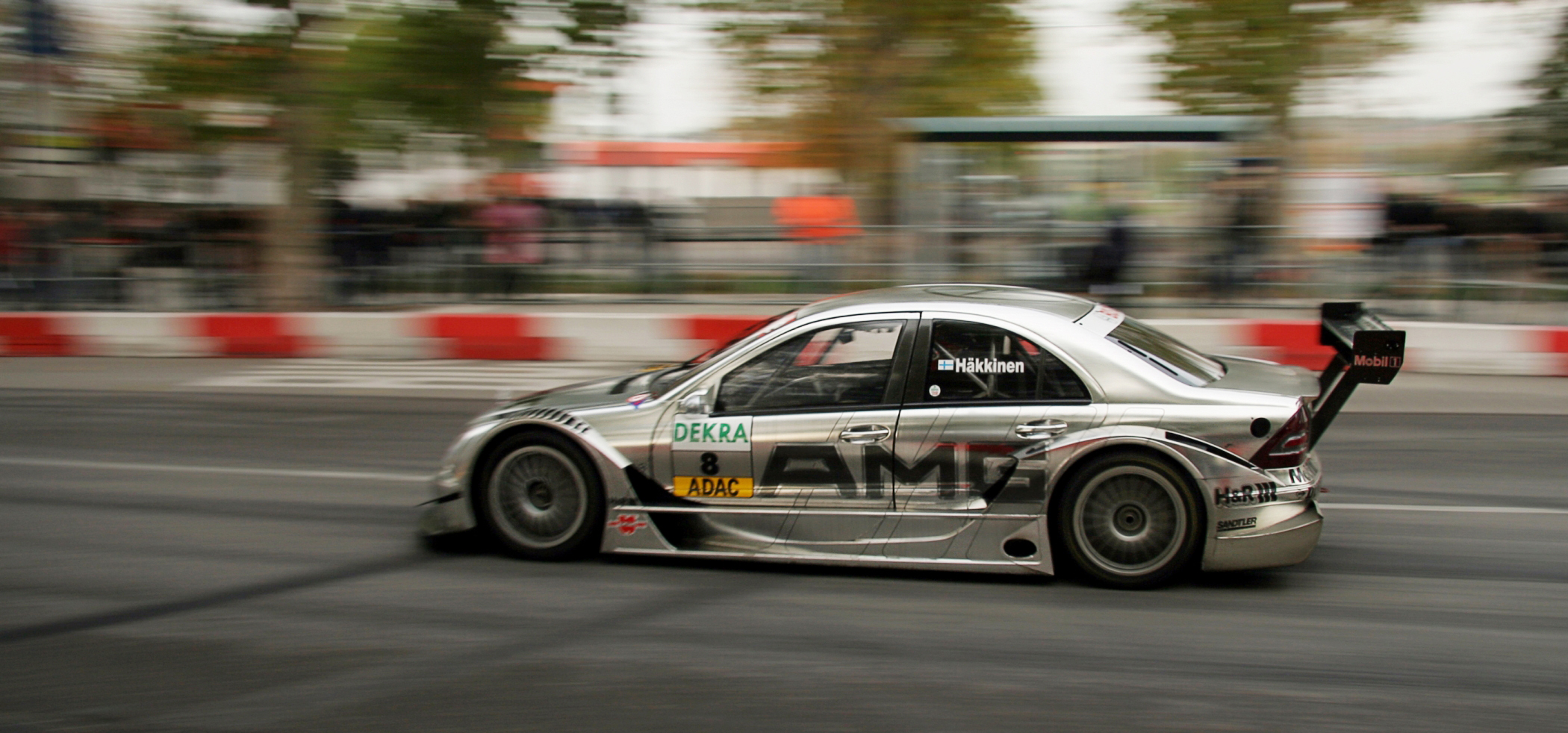
Mika Häkkinen in his Mercedes, 2006

Drivers have included a mixture of young and older drivers, including well known former Formula One drivers David Coulthard, Bernd Schneider, Allan McNish, Jean Alesi, Heinz-Harald Frentzen, Ralf Schumacher, JJ Lehto, Pedro Lamy, Karl Wendlinger, Emanuele Pirro, Stefano Modena, two-time F1 world champion Mika Häkkinen and F1 2008 Canadian Grand Prix winner Robert Kubica. Others, such as Laurent Aïello, Tom Kristensen, Dindo Capello, Frank Biela, Marco Werner, Lucas Luhr, Alexandre Prémat, Yves Olivier, Jaroslav Janiš, and Alain Menu have made their career racing in sports cars and touring cars.

The DTM is also increasingly being used by young drivers such as Robert Wickens and Gary Paffett to jump-start their racing career in single-seaters. Wickens was in the 2012 Mercedes young driver program and in his first year of DTM. This strategy appears to have worked well for Christijan Albers, who built a reputation by finishing second and third in the 2003 and 2004 championships with Mercedes-Benz and then graduated to Formula One in 2005. He came back in 2008, but this time driving for Audi. After winning the championship in 2010, Paul di Resta raced from 2011 until 2013 for Mercedes-engined Formula One team Force India. He has now returned to the Mercedes DTM team. Pascal Wehrlein, who has won the championship in a Mercedes car in 2015 went on to race for Sauber F1 Team and was a test driver for the Mercedes F1 team.

Gary Paffett has also used his championship win to gain a test with McLaren, and they signed him as permanent test driver for 2006. This prevented Paffett from defending his title in 2006, however he thought that it will be a springboard for a race seat during the 2007 Formula One season. The plan failed however, and Paffett returned to DTM in 2007, but in a 2006 specification car.

Six female drivers have taken part in the championship. In 2006, Vanina Ickx started racing for Audi and Susie Stoddart (later Wolff) for Mercedes. In 2008, Ickx was replaced by Katherine Legge, who was subsequently replaced for the 2011 season by Rahel Frey. In 2021, Sophia Flörsch started racing for Audi and Esmee Hawkey for Lamborghini.

== Cars, technology and specifications ==
=== Chassis ===
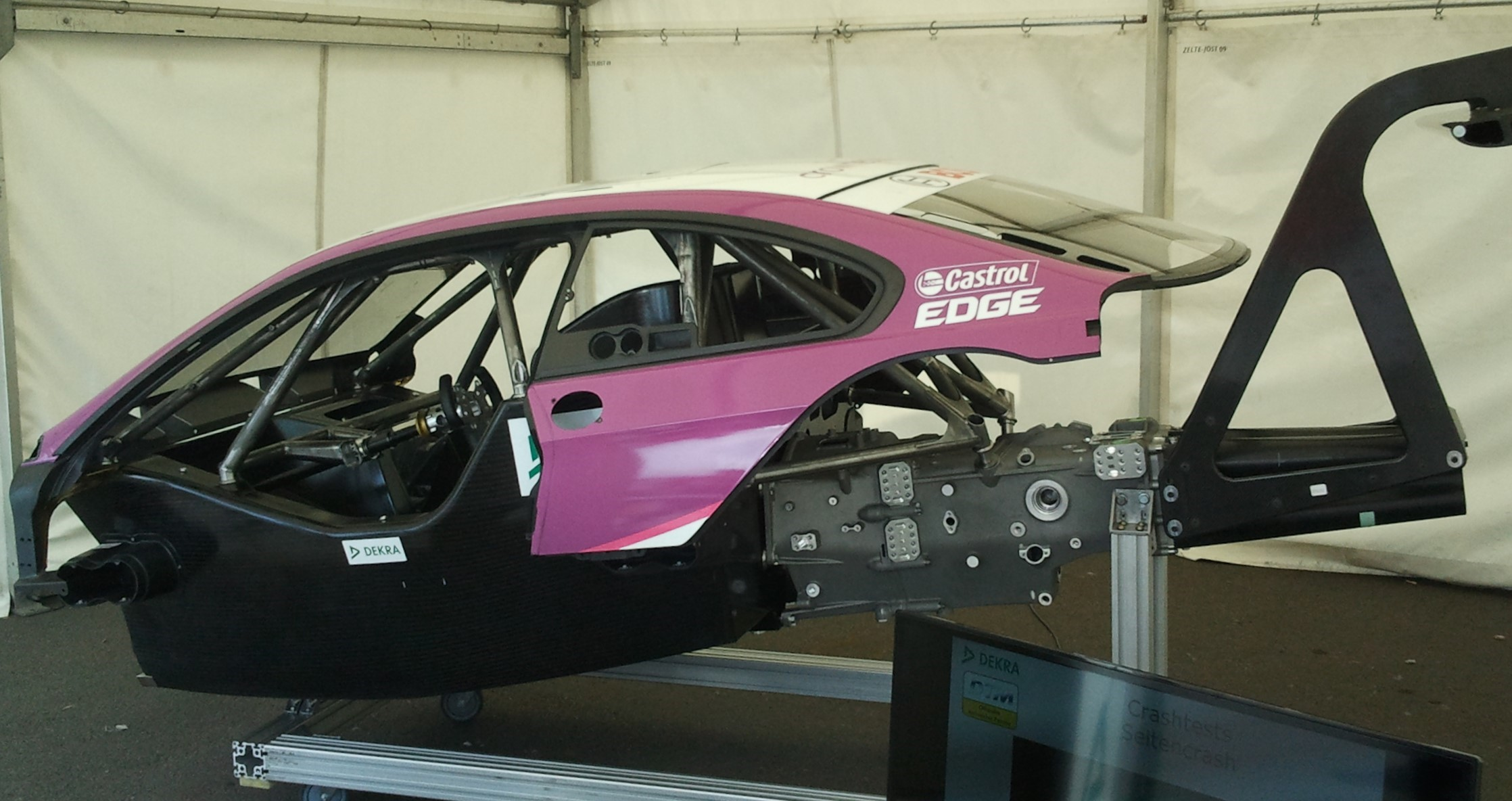
The cutaway DTM car

Deutsche Tourenwagen Masters cars closely resemble public road vehicles as a reference to the silhouette racing car format. The championship controls and specifies the chassis/car and engine manufacturers that teams are allowed to use each season.The league's choice of manufacturers saw frequent changes between its revival in 2000 and the end of the "DTM Prototype" era in 2020, due to constantly changing car specification regulations and excessive expenditure on the Silhouette Prototype cars.

Opel provided cars and Spiess engines in 2000–2005 with two different models (Astra in 2000–2003, later Vectra GTS V8 in 2004–2005). Opel ended its DTM program after the 2005 season, citing costs and company restructuring.

Aston Martin provided the cars to R-Motorsport in 2019, but left DTM after the 2020 season having unable to secure an engine supplier. Aston Martin subsequently re-entered the DTM under the GT3 class a year after.

In 2000, Mercedes-Benz AMG came to the new DTM from the 24 Hours of Le Mans. Mercedes-Benz won their first race in the 1st Hockenheimring round, as well as the series title. In July 2017, Mercedes-Benz AMG officials announced the company's withdrawal from German touring car racing after the 2018 season and the immediate discontinuation of its DTM program, coinciding with its entrance into FIA Formula E Championship in 2019, and its discontinuation of its DMSB program. Upon the DTM's transition to GT3 Specification cars in 2021, Mercedes AMG re-entered.

During the first inaugural season, all DTM car styles utilized shorter S-segment compact sports two-door coupé-style cars up until 2003. Despite the usage, the shorter S-segment compacts were heavily criticized by DTM fans due to it being against the touring car DNA that traditionally utilized the four to five doors, and since 2004 coupé-style cars were shrunk down to minority status due to the transition to four-door sedan saloon-style cars up until 2011. By 2012 and onwards the two-door coupé-styles returned until 2020, with longer length, longer wheelbase, slightly lowered height and aggressive aero package based on compact D-segment compact executive cars in comparison to cars that raced the decade prior. An update on the coupé-style car range saw the addition of a redesigned rear wing in 2017.

All DTM race cars had RWD and 4.0-litre V8 engines (later 2.0-litre inline-4 turbocharged engines) which were initially air-restricted to 460 hp, over 500 hp within 2017 - 2018, 610 hp including 30 hp push-to-pass by 2019 and later 580 hp + 60 hp push-to-pass in the 2020 season, regardless of engine nor layout in the road cars.

Parts are commonly sourced from third party specialists; transmission (from Hewland), brakes (from AP Racing), wheels (from ATS) and Hankook tyres. Aerodynamics are tested in wind tunnels before the season, equalized and maintained as such throughout the season. All of this however changed when the "silhouette prototype" specification was dropped in favor of the globally accepted GT3 Specification from 2021 onwards.

DTM cars adhered to a front engine rear-wheel-drive design during the prototype silhouette era. A roll cage serves as a space frame chassis, covered by CFRP crash elements on the side, front and rear and covered by metallic bodywork. They have a closed cockpit, a single-plane rear wing, and other aerodynamic parts such as front splitter, side winglets and hood vents.

==== Aerodynamics ====
All DTM cars' aero packages are completely assembled alongside a flat underbody. Serratured side front fenders are included along with triple-decker front side winglet flicks, multiple side winglet flicks and multiple rear winglet flicks. The 2017–2018 generation of rear wing for all Deutsche Tourenwagen Masters cars are slightly wider, bi-plane wing and also parallelogram rear wing end plate. From 2019 to 2020, the new generation of rear wings are wider than 2012–2018 generation of rear wing, single-plane wing and uniquely shaped rear wing plate. DTM Silhouette Prototypes had included a Drag Reduction System since the 2013 season (similar to Formula One) for helping the driver to overtake.

The HYLO (High Yaw Lift-Off) aerodynamic safety was integrated on the rear wing for all Deutsche Tourenwagen Masters cars in 2020., this safety system was developed by Audi's motorsport division "Audi Sport" to prevent cars from becoming airborne during crashes or sideways slides by producing significant aerodynamic downforce which pushes the car onto the track, this system was created out of necessity specifically for the Silhouette prototype classification of car formerly used in the DTM as this class of cars design created significant aerodynamic lift during spins which reduced braking performance and traction significantly making the car much harder to stop or control which could lead to a much more dangerous crash, the HYLO system was the solution to this problem. The HYLO system was however short lived as the year after its inception the DTM switched to GT3 Classification cars that didn't need the HYLO system due to their much larger fixed wing design naturally preventing significant lift during spins.

==== Tyres ====
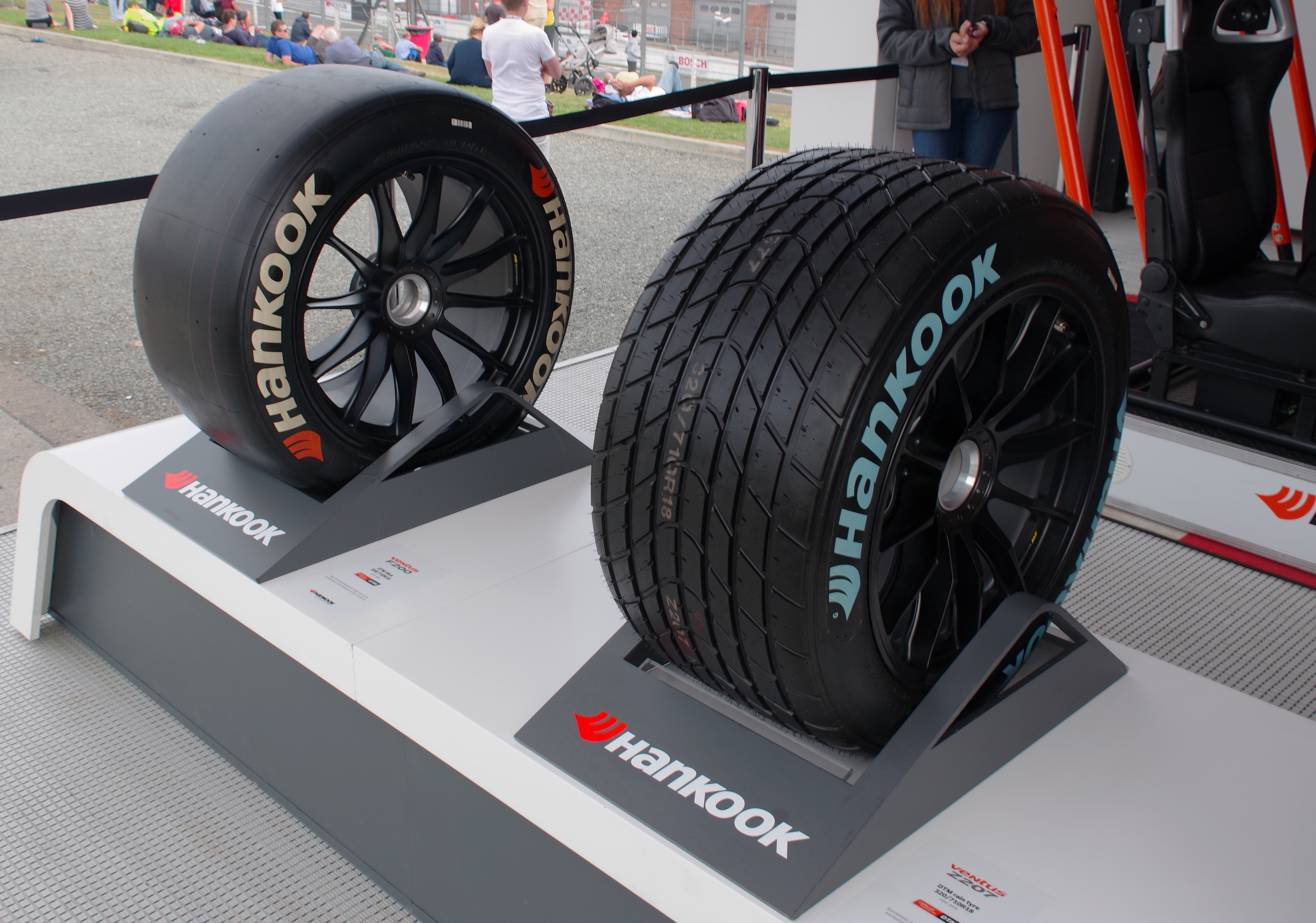
The Hankook DTM tyres in 2018

Previously Hankook and Dunlop were the tyre partner and supplier of DTM from 2000 to 2010 seasons (Dunlop) and 2011 to 2020 seasons (Hankook), carrying the SP Sport Maxx (Dunlop 2000–2010) and Ventus (Hankook 2011–2020) brands respectively. The DTM runs the bespoke compounds and same size as LMP and GT cars since 2000 and re-profiled in 2012. The current front tyre sizes are 300/680-R18 (11.8/26.8-R18) and the rear tyre sizes are 320/700-R18 (12.6/27.9-R18) (previously front tyre sizes were 240/650-R18 (9.45/25.6-R18) and the rear tyre sizes were 280/660-R18 (11.0/25.6-R18) in 2000–2003 later front tyre sizes were 265/660-R18 (10.4/25.9-R18) and the rear tyre sizes were 280/660-R18 (11.0/25.9-R18) in 2004–2010 and later front tyre sizes were 260/660-R18 (10.2/25.9-R18) and the rear tyre sizes were 280/660-R18 (11.0/25.9-R18) in 2011). The compounds of Hankook Deutsche Tourenwagen Masters tyres are currently only one dry slick compound (standard prime hard) and one wet treaded compound (full-wet only). Option tyres were used as a soft compound in 2013–2014 seasons.

=== Performance ===
According to research and pre-season stability tests, the pre-2019 model can go 0 to 100 km/h in approximately 2.6 seconds. The car had a top speed of 280 km/h (174 mph) meaning that it is the second fastest touring car behind the Australian V8 Supercars.

Since DTM switched from traditional classic electronic indirect-injected V8 naturally aspirated engines to fuel-efficient direct-injected inline-4 turbocharged engines from 2019 to 2020, that generation's model could go 0 to 100 km/h in approximately 2.8 seconds and had has a top speed of 300 km/h (186 mph) and thus outperforming Australian Supercars top speed (Albeit, DTM cars use 102 RON fuel compared with Australian Supercars using E85 fuel. A fair comparison would be both series cars using the same fuel type).

==== Balance of performance ====
In 2015, Deutsche Tourenwagen Masters introduced a Balance of Performance (BoP) system to improve racing spectacle. The Balance of Performance (BoP) weight regulations specified a car weight allowance range between 2,436–2,513 lb (1,105–1,140 kg) in 2015–2016, later changed to 2,414–2,513 lb (1,095–1,140 kg) from the mid-2017 season, in effect being closer to success ballast system used in British Touring Car Championship and Super GT despite the name. The Balance of Performance (BoP) weight regulations were scrapped just before the penultimate round of the 2017 season due to several protests and criticisms from DTM teams.

=== Prohibitions ===
Driver aids such as ABS, traction control, launch control, active suspension, cockpit-adjustable anti-roll bar and partial car-to-team radio communications were previously prohibited under the pre 2021 "prototype" regulations except fuel mapping.

=== Driver safety ===
Drivers are required to wear a race suit, Nomex underwear, gloves, socks, boots and headsocks in the DTM. Meanwhile, the helmets for all DTM drivers are made of carbon-fibre shell, lined with energy-absorbing foam and Nomex padding. The helmet type must meet or exceed FIA 8860-2010 certification approval as a homologation for all auto racing drivers. HANS device are required to be worn by DTM drivers since the 2002 season that meets or exceeds FIA 8858-2010 certification approval. Earpieces are also required by DTM drivers to improve communication.

== Future ==
As the Super GT GT500-style "Class 1" format (Often referred to in DTM as "Prototype Silhouette" cars) was retired after 2020 season due to increasing costs, the series adopted the GT3 format from the 2021 season onward. The engine format of new GT3 will no longer mandated instead of free (displacement, shape, number of cylinders and injectors). As a result of the GT3 transition, the series will no longer utilize full-factory manufacturer entrants in order to save budgets. This transition has allowed for a more consistent grid of competitors whereas previously teams would frequently enter and exit the series due to the excessive costs, DTM has since 2021 seen consistent entries from BMW, Mercedes, Porsche, Audi and Ferrari. Upon the DTM's transition to GT3 Specification cars in 2021, Mercedes AMG immediately re-entered the DTM with the AMG GT3 EVO fielded by various customer teams such as Mercedes-AMG Team Winward Racing and Mercedes-AMG Team Landgraf. Mclaren entered the DTM in 2024 with the 720s GT3 EVO alongside Lamborghini who entered in the same year with the Huracan GT3 EVO2. Aston Martin returned to the DTM in 2025 when customer team Comtoyou Racing entered the DTM with the Aston Martin Vantage GT3 EVO. Ford re-entered DTM the same year when customer team HRT elected to switch from the Mercedes AMG GT3 EVO to the Ford Mustang GT3 for the 2025 season.

=== Chassis & GT3 information ===
The GT3 specification of racing is used globally and has replaced many older iterations such as GT2, GTE and Class 1. While this specification can be seen in other series across the globe such as GTWC GT3, IMSA GTD, WEC LMGT3 and NLS SP8 the DTM is widely considered to utilize the "fastest" configuration of GT3 class cars by allowing more power (less restriction) and less weight (Less ballast) than most other GT3 series. After the switch from "silhouette prototypes" to GT3 regulation cars, DTM maintained the rear-wheel drive layout with the only major change being the permitted use of front, middle or rear-mounted engine configurations whereas previously in the prototype era only front engine cars were allowed.

The price of the newer GT3 Specification of car used 2021–Present is approximately €500,000-€850,000 for most examples. Above the purchase price of the race car, teams spend an additional €800,000 on various expenses relating to series entry fees, travel, staff and driver accommodation and hospitality, car maintenance and replacement - most of which are funded via monetary winnings and sponsorships.

=== Aerodynamics ===
Unlike the aero systems seen on previous generation silhouette prototypes, GT3 regulations do not allow for electronically adjustable/movable aerodynamic components such as DRS. Aerodynamic components such as the front and rear splitter and winglets are fixed to the body of the car, the rear wing may be manually adjusted by the teams mechanics in order to adapt the car to higher/lower downforce circuits, the adjustment of the rear wing is heavily regulated as it is a component of the BOP {Balance of performance}, the SRO and ADAC who manage the BOP of the DTM instruct teams on adjustments they can/can't/ must make to the rear wing of their car

=== Race starts ===
The race start format will no longer have standing start with a rolling start being implemented in place.

=== Tyres ===
Michelin was the tire partner of the DTM in 2021, carrying the Pilot Sport GT S9M brand.

Pirelli has been the exclusive tyre partner of the DTM and wider ADAC series of racing championships since 2023. The current generation of DTM GT3 models use 18-inch Pirelli DHG slick tyres for regular dry conditions racing and 18-inch Pirelli Cinturato WHB tyres for racing under wet conditions.

=== Performance ===
The current Generation of GT3 cars used by the DTM are able to go 0 to 100 km/h in approximately 2.8 seconds and can typically achieve a slightly lower top speed than their prototype predecessors of 280 km/h (174 mph). As a wide variety of cars are eligible to compete under GT3 regulations, the overall performance of every car is adjusted and limited accordingly to allow for more competitive racing, this adjustment is known as BOP {Balance of Performance}.

=== BOP ===
The BOP system returned in 2021 as the new GT3 class regulations allowed a much wider array of eligible cars that were designed with significantly different engines, weights and overall performance, this necessitated the usage of BOP to allow these vastly different cars to be able to compete under equal conditions. The BOP system used globally in all GT3 racing series uses a series of complex calculations performed both internally by series organizers (Such as ADAC and SRO) as well as externally by data companies such as AWS who place weight, overall engine power, ride height, downforce, airflow and turbo size restrictions on teams accordingly with the goal of allowing these vastly different racing machines to achieve the exact same theoretically optimal lap time. In all major GT3 based series the BOP applied to each brands cars changes from one track to another and adjustments to the BOP of each car are made progressively throughout a racing weekend by using performance data from practice and qualifying sessions to have the BOP perfected for the race.

Unique to DTM is the "Success Ballast" system, this means that teams that finish within the top 3 at any race will be mandated to add additional weight to their car for the next session: qualifying and main races. If the team does not finish within the top 3 at the next race this additional weight will be removed. While it received backlash, the success of the ballast system has allowed for closer competition between teams.

=== Prohibitions ===
When DTM switched to GT3 specification cars they adopted the standard GT3 regulations on driver aids, which allowed for Traction Control, ABS and launch control, all of which were previously prohibited, active suspension however remains prohibited. As for Communication systems, the GT3 generation of DTM allows for Pit-Boards as well as two-way direct radio communication allowing both the team to communicate to the driver, and the driver to communicate back to the team via the in built radio system, there are however several regulations regarding what may be communicated to and from drivers, specifically teams are forbidden from issuing "Team-Orders" which refers to the practice where a racing team with more than one driver, tells one of their drivers to do something on track that hinders their own performance or the performance of other competitors in the interest of "helping" their teammate, this practice is completely banned in DTM following prior controversy and is heavily regulated in many other series such as Formula One.

== Scoring systems ==
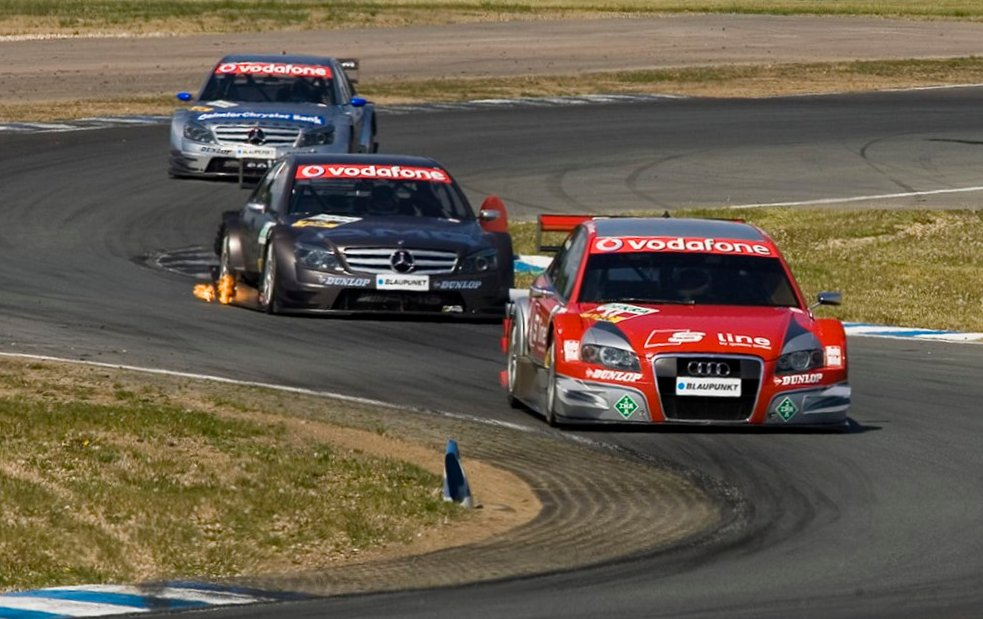
Oschersleben 2007: Rockenfeller, Häkkinen and Spengler

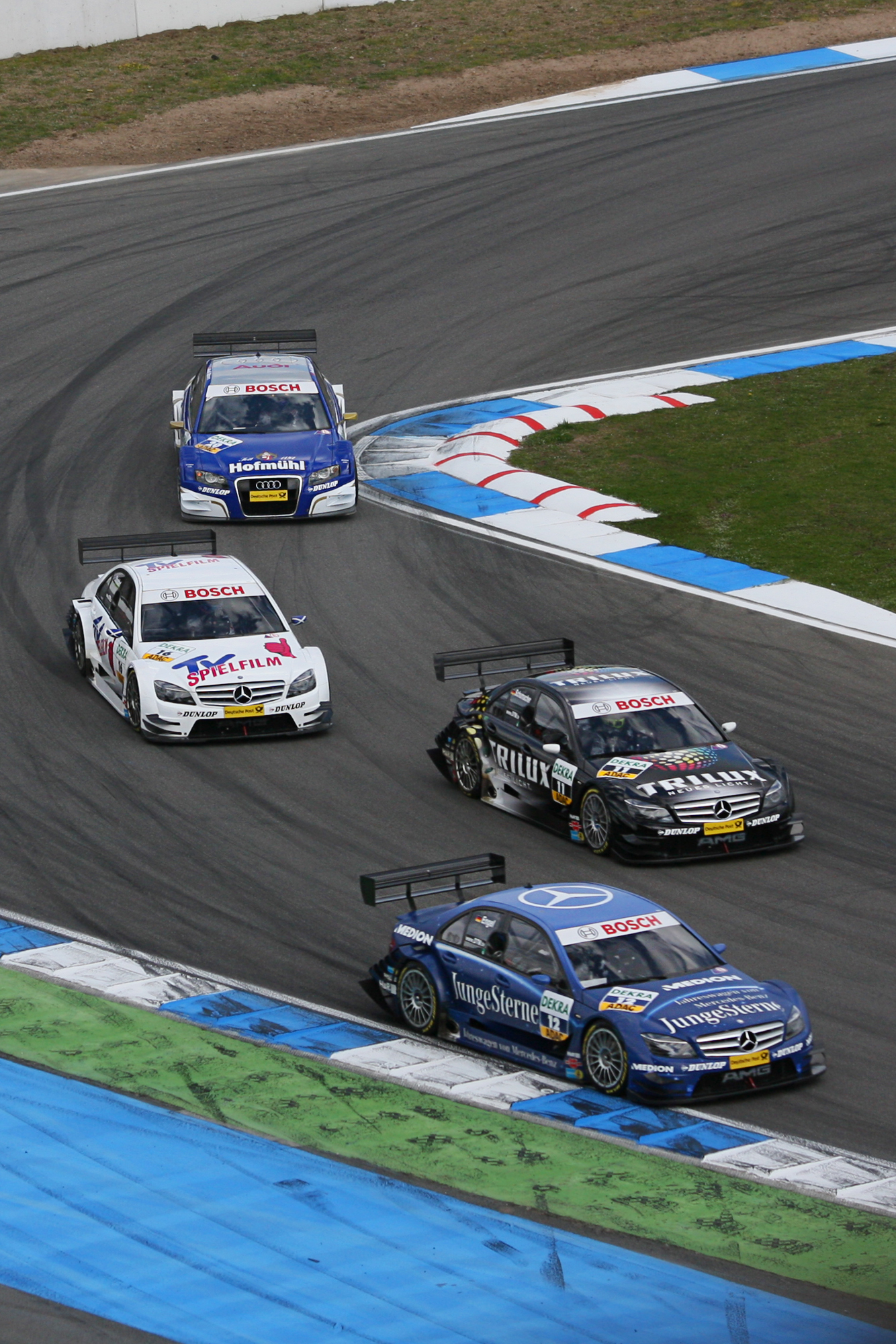
Hockenheimring, April 2008

This is the evolution of DTM points scoring system history since reborn.

2000

| Position | 1st | 2nd | 3rd | 4th | 5th | 6th | 7th | 8th | 9th | 10th |
| Points | 20 | 15 | 12 | 10 | 8 | 6 | 4 | 3 | 2 | 1 |

2001

Points for short race
| Position | 1st | 2nd | 3rd |
| Points | 3 | 2 | 1 |

Points for long race
| Position | 1st | 2nd | 3rd | 4th | 5th | 6th | 7th | 8th | 9th | 10th |
| Points | 20 | 15 | 12 | 10 | 8 | 6 | 4 | 3 | 2 | 1 |

2002

Points for short race
| Position | 1st | 2nd | 3rd |
| Points | 3 | 2 | 1 |

Points for long race
| Position | 1st | 2nd | 3rd | 4th | 5th | 6th |
| Points | 10 | 6 | 4 | 3 | 2 | 1 |

2003–2011

| Position | 1st | 2nd | 3rd | 4th | 5th | 6th | 7th | 8th |
| Points | 10 | 8 | 6 | 5 | 4 | 3 | 2 | 1 |

2012–2014

| Position | 1st | 2nd | 3rd | 4th | 5th | 6th | 7th | 8th | 9th | 10th |
| Points | 25 | 18 | 15 | 12 | 10 | 8 | 6 | 4 | 2 | 1 |

2015–2022

Points for both races
| Position | 1st | 2nd | 3rd | 4th | 5th | 6th | 7th | 8th | 9th | 10th |
| Points | 25 | 18 | 15 | 12 | 10 | 8 | 6 | 4 | 2 | 1 |

2023–present

Points for both races
| Position | 1st | 2nd | 3rd | 4th | 5th | 6th | 7th | 8th | 9th | 10th | 11th | 12th | 13th | 14th | 15th |
| Points | 25 | 20 | 16 | 13 | 11 | 10 | 9 | 8 | 7 | 6 | 5 | 4 | 3 | 2 | 1 |

Additionally, the top three placed drivers in qualifying also received points:

| Qualifying Position | 1st | 2nd | 3rd |
| Points | 3 | 2 | 1 |

If in the case of a tie, DTM will determine the champion based on the most first-place finishes. If there is still a tie, DTM will determine the champion by the most second-place finishes, then the most third-place finishes, etc., until a champion is determined. DTM will apply the same system to other ties in the rankings at the close of the season and at any other time during the season.

== Manufacturer representation ==
| Make | 2000–2003 | 2004–2005 | 2006 | 2007–2011 | 2012 | 2013 | 2014–2018 | 2019 | 2020 | 2021 | 2022 | 2023 | 2024 | 2025 |
|---|---|---|---|---|---|---|---|---|---|---|---|---|---|---|
| (United Kingdom) Aston Martin | | | | | | | | Vantage Turbo | | | | | | Vantage AMR GT3 Evo |
| (Germany) Audi | TT | A4 | | | A5 | RS5 | | RS5 Turbo | | R8 LMS Evo I | R8 LMS Evo II | | | |
| (Germany) BMW | | | | | M3 | | M4 | M4 Turbo | | M6 GT3 | M4 GT3 | | | M4 GT3 Evo |
| (Italy) Ferrari | | | | | | | | | | 488 GT3 Evo | | 296 GT3 | | |
| (United States) Ford | | | | | | | | | | | | | | Mustang GT3 |
| (Japan) Honda | | | | | | | | NSX-GT | | | | | | |
| (Italy) Lamborghini | | | | | | | | | | Huracán GT3 Evo | | Huracán GT3 Evo 2 | | |
| (Japan) Lexus | | | | | | | | LC500 | | | | | | |
| (United Kingdom) McLaren | | | | | | | | | | 720S GT3 | | | 720S GT3 Evo | |
| (Germany) Mercedes-Benz | CLK | C-Class (W203) | | C-Class (W204) | C-Coupé | | | | | AMG GT3 Evo | | | | |
| (Japan) Nissan | | | | | | | | GT-R | | | | | | |
| (Germany) Opel | Astra | Vectra | | | | | | | | | | | | |
| (Germany) Porsche | | | | | | | | | | 911 GT3 R (991.2) | | 911 GT3 R (992) | | |

== Circuits ==
- (Germany) Hockenheimring (2000–present)
- (Germany) Motorsport Arena Oschersleben (2000–2001, 2004–2015, 2023–present)
- (Germany) Norisring (2000–2019, 2021–present)
- (Germany) Sachsenring (2000–2002, 2023–present)
- (Germany) Nürburgring (2000–present)
- (Germany) Lausitzring (2000–present)
- (Austria) Red Bull Ring (2001–2003, 2011–2018, 2021–present)
- (Netherlands) Circuit Zandvoort (2001–2018, 2023–present)
- (Belgium) Circuit Zolder (2002, 2019–2021)
- (United Kingdom) Donington Park (2002–2003)
- (Italy) Adria International Raceway (2003–2004, 2010)
- (Portugal) Circuito do Estoril (2004)
- (China) Shanghai Street Circuit (2004, 2010)
- (Czech Republic) Brno Circuit (2004–2005)
- (Belgium) Circuit de Spa-Francorchamps (2005, 2020, 2022)
- (Turkey) Istanbul Park (2005)
- (United Kingdom) Brands Hatch (2006–2013, 2018–2019)
- (Spain) Circuit de Barcelona-Catalunya (2006–2009)
- (France) Bugatti Circuit (2006, 2008)
- (Italy) Mugello Circuit (2007–2008)
- (France) Dijon-Prenois (2009)
- (Spain) Circuit Ricardo Tormo (2010–2012)
- (Russia) Moscow Raceway (2013–2017)
- (Hungary) Hungaroring (2014, 2016–2018)
- (Italy) Misano World Circuit (2018–2019)
- (Netherlands) TT Circuit Assen (2019–2021)
- (Italy) Monza Circuit (2021)
- (Portugal) Algarve International Circuit (2022)
- (Italy) Imola Circuit (2022)

== Champions ==
| Season | Champion | Team | Champion's Car | Manufacturer's Champion |
|---|---|---|---|---|
| 1984– 1996 | See Deutsche Tourenwagen Meisterschaft | | | |
| 1997– 1999 | not held | | | |
| 2000 | (Germany) Bernd Schneider | HWA Team | Mercedes-Benz | Mercedes-Benz |
| 2001 | (Germany) Bernd Schneider (2) | HWA Team | Mercedes-Benz | Mercedes-Benz |
| 2002 | (France) Laurent Aïello | ABT Sportsline | Audi | Mercedes-Benz |
| 2003 | (Germany) Bernd Schneider (3) | HWA Team | Mercedes-Benz | Mercedes-Benz |
| 2004 | (Sweden) Mattias Ekström | ABT Sportsline | Audi | Audi |
| 2005 | (United Kingdom) Gary Paffett | HWA Team | Mercedes-Benz | Mercedes-Benz |
| 2006 | (Germany) Bernd Schneider (4) | HWA Team | Mercedes-Benz | Mercedes-Benz |
| 2007 | (Sweden) Mattias Ekström (2) | ABT Sportsline | Audi | Audi |
| 2008 | (Germany) Timo Scheider | ABT Sportsline | Audi | Mercedes-Benz |
| 2009 | (Germany) Timo Scheider (2) | ABT Sportsline | Audi | Mercedes-Benz |
| 2010 | (United Kingdom) Paul di Resta | HWA Team | Mercedes-Benz | Mercedes-Benz |
| 2011 | (Germany) Martin Tomczyk | Phoenix Racing | Audi | Audi |
| 2012 | (Canada) Bruno Spengler | Schnitzer Motorsport | BMW | BMW |
| 2013 | (Germany) Mike Rockenfeller | Phoenix Racing | Audi | BMW |
| 2014 | (Germany) Marco Wittmann | Team RMG | BMW | Audi |
| 2015 | (Germany) Pascal Wehrlein | HWA Team | Mercedes-Benz | BMW |
| 2016 | (Germany) Marco Wittmann (2) | Team RMG | BMW | Audi |
| 2017 | (Germany) René Rast | Team Rosberg | Audi | Audi |
| 2018 | (United Kingdom) Gary Paffett (2) | HWA Team | Mercedes-Benz | Mercedes-Benz |
| 2019 | (Germany) René Rast (2) | Team Rosberg | Audi | Audi |
| 2020 | (Germany) René Rast (3) | Team Rosberg | Audi | Audi |
| 2021 | (Germany) Maximilian Götz | Team HRT | Mercedes-Benz | Mercedes-Benz |
| 2022 | (South Africa) Sheldon van der Linde | Schubert Motorsport | BMW | Audi |
| 2023 | (Austria) Thomas Preining | Manthey EMA | Porsche | Porsche |
| 2024 | (Italy) Mirko Bortolotti | SSR Performance | Lamborghini | Mercedes-Benz |
| 2025 | (Turkey) Ayhancan Güven | Manthey EMA | Porsche | Mercedes-Benz |
| 2026 | (Austria) Thomas Preining (2) | Manthey Racing | Porsche | Mercedes-Benz |

== Broadcasters ==
=== DACH ===
ProSiebenSat.1 Media is currently owned the domestic DTM broadcasting rights from 2018 until 2021. Qualifying and race sessions is broadcast live on ran but Sat.1 only shows the race sessions. In Switzerland, the coverage also available on MySports through UPC.

=== outside DACH ===
Free-practices available worldwide via DTM official YouTube channel but for qualifying and race sessions only available for selected markets (including unsold) through OTT service DTM Grid.

| Country/region | Broadcaster | |
|---|---|---|
| Andorra | Automoto | |
| France | Automoto | |
| Monaco | Automoto | |
| MENA: Algeria; Bahrain; Chad; Comoros; Djibouti; Iran; Iraq; Jordan; Kuwait; Lebanon; Libya; Mauritania; Morocco; Oman; Palestine; Qatar; Somalia; Sudan; Syria; Tunisia; United Arab Emirates; Yemen | beIN Sports | |
| Southeast Asia: Brunei; Cambodia; **Indonesia**; Laos; Malaysia; **Philippines**; Singapore; Thailand; **Timor-Leste** | beIN Sports | |
| Balkans: Bosnia and Herzegovina; Croatia; Montenegro; North Macedonia; Serbia; Slovenia | Sport Klub | |
| Belgium | Eleven Sports | |
| Luxembourg | Eleven Sports | |
| Canada | Racer Network | |
| United States | Racer Network | |
| India | FanCode | |
| Argentina | Star+ | |
| Brazil | Disney+ | ESPN |
| Cyprus | Nova Sport | |
| Japan | J Sports | |
| Mexico | Fox Sports | |
| Switzerland | ServusTV | |
| China | IQIYI | |
| Czech Republic | Sport 5 | |
| Indonesia | Mola TV | |
| Timor-Leste | Mola TV | |
| Ireland | Viaplay | |
| United Kingdom | Viaplay | |
| Netherlands | Viaplay | |
| Poland | Viaplay | |
| New Zealand | Sky Sport | |
| Portugal | Sport TV | |
| Romania | Sport Extra | |
| Spain | DAZN | |
| Sweden | Viaplay | |
| Turkey | S Sport | |
| Bulgaria | Diema Sport | |

Bold indicates highlights only

== See also ==
- List of Deutsche Tourenwagen Masters records
- Deutsche Tourenwagen Meisterschaft (1984–1996)
- V8Star Series
