= List of Deutsche Tourenwagen Masters records =

The list of records in the Deutsche Tourenwagen Masters includes records and statistics set in the DTM and ITC. The competition started as the Deutsche Tourenwagen Meisterschaft (DTM) in 1984. In 1995, the competition expanded and was split between a domestic season and the new FIA International Touring Car Series. The following year, the DTM went on hiatus but the ITC only lasted one season before being cancelled. In 2000, the revived series Deutsche Tourenwagen Masters began.

== Drivers ==
=== Wins ===
Championship wins
	Driver	Total championships	DTM (1984–1995)	ITC (1995–1996)	DTM (since 2000)	Season
1	(Germany) Bernd Schneider	6	1	1	4	1995 (DTM), 1995 (ITC), 2000, 2001, 2003, 2006
2	(Germany) Klaus Ludwig	3	3	-	-	1988, 1992, 1994
=	(Germany) René Rast	3	-	-	3	2017, 2019, 2020
4	(Sweden) Mattias Ekström	2	-	-	2	2004, 2007
=	(United Kingdom) Gary Paffett	2	-	-	2	2005, 2018
=	(Germany) Timo Scheider	2	-	-	2	2008, 2009
=	(Germany) Marco Wittmann	2	-	-	2	2014, 2016
7	(Germany) Volker Strycek	1	1	-	-	1984
=	(Sweden) Per Stureson	1	1	-	-	1985
=	(Denmark) Kurt Thiim	1	1	-	-	1986
=	(Belgium) Eric van de Poele	1	1	-	-	1987
=	(Italy) Roberto Ravaglia	1	1	-	-	1989
=	(Germany) Hans-Joachim Stuck	1	1	-	-	1990
=	(Germany) Frank Biela	1	1	-	-	1991
=	(Italy) Nicola Larini	1	1	-	-	1993
=	(Germany) Manuel Reuter	1	-	1	-	1996
=	(France) Laurent Aïello	1	-	-	1	2002
=	(United Kingdom) Paul di Resta	1	-	-	1	2010
=	(Germany) Martin Tomczyk	1	-	-	1	2011
=	(Canada) Bruno Spengler	1	-	-	1	2012
=	(Germany) Mike Rockenfeller	1	-	-	1	2013
=	(Germany) Pascal Wehrlein	1	-	-	1	2015
=	(Germany) Maximilian Götz	1	-	-	1	2021
=	(South Africa) Sheldon van der Linde	1	-	-	1	2022
=	(Austria) Thomas Preining	1	-	-	1	2023
=	(Italy) Mirko Bortolotti	1	-	-	1	2024
=	(Turkey) Ayhancan Güven	1	-	-	1	2025

=== Statistics ===
Race wins
	Driver	Total DTM
1	(Germany) Bernd Schneider	46
2	(Germany) Klaus Ludwig	37
3	(Sweden) Mattias Ekström	23
=	(United Kingdom) Gary Paffett	23
5	(Denmark) Kurt Thiim	19
6	(Italy) Nicola Larini	18
7	(Venezuela) Johnny Cecotto	14
=	(Italy) Alessandro Nannini	14
=	(Canada) Bruno Spengler	14
=	(Germany) Hans-Joachim Stuck	13

Podiums (since 2000)
	Driver	Total DTM
1	(Germany) Bernd Schneider	112
2	(Sweden) Mattias Ekström	83
3	(United Kingdom) Gary Paffett	46
4	(Canada) Bruno Spengler	38
5	(Germany) Martin Tomczyk	27
6	(United Kingdom) Jamie Green	24
7	(Germany) Timo Scheider	22
8	(United Kingdom) Paul di Resta	22
9	(Denmark) Tom Kristensen	18
=	(Switzerland) Marcel Fässler	16

Pole positions
	Driver	Total DTM
1	(Germany) Bernd Schneider	40
2	(Sweden) Mattias Ekström	20
=	(Canada) Bruno Spengler	17
3	(Germany) Klaus Ludwig	16
=	(Denmark) Kurt Thiim	16
6	(United Kingdom) Gary Paffett	13
7	(Germany) Timo Scheider	11
8	(Germany) Harald Grohs	10
=	(Italy) Nicola Larini	10
10	(Denmark) Tom Kristensen	9

Fastest laps
	Driver	Total DTM
1	(Germany) Bernd Schneider	62
2	(Italy) Nicola Larini	22
3	(Germany) Klaus Ludwig	16
4	(Sweden) Mattias Ekström	17
5	(Canada) Bruno Spengler	14
6	(Denmark) Kurt Thiim	13
=	(United Kingdom) Jamie Green	13
8	(Italy) Alessandro Nannini	12
9	(United Kingdom) Steve Soper	10
10	(Germany) Hans-Joachim Stuck	9

Wins by nationality
	Country	Total DTM
1	Germany	201
2	(United Kingdom) Great Britain	48
3	Denmark	26
4	Italy	24
5	Sweden	23
6	France	19
7	Canada	15
8	Venezuela	14
9	Turkey	5
10	Finland	4
=	Brazil	4
11	Switzerland	3

Pole positions by nationality
	Country	Total DTM
1	Germany	152
2	(United Kingdom) Great Britain	28
3	Denmark	25
4	Sweden	23
5	Canada	21
6	France	12
=	Italy	11
8	Venezuela	5
=	Switzerland	5
10	Finland	4
11	Brazil	3
=	Belgium	3
=	Spain	3
14	Austria	1
=	Netherlands	1

Fastest laps by nationality
	Country	Total DTM
1	Germany	205
2	(United Kingdom) Great Britain	52
3	Italy	50
4	France	25
5	Denmark	19
6	Sweden	17
7	Canada	14
8	Finland	9
9	Venezuela	6
=	Switzerland	6
11	Austria	5
12	Spain	4
13	Belgium	1
=	Brazil	1
=	United States	1

Most wins in a season (single / feature)
	Country	Total (Races)	Season
1	(United Kingdom) Gary Paffett	5 (11)	2005
2	(Germany) Klaus Ludwig	4 (9)	1985
3	(France) Laurent Aïello	4 (10)	2002
=	(Netherlands) Christijan Albers	4 (10)	2003
=	(United Kingdom) Gary Paffett	4 (10)	2004
=	(Sweden) Mattias Ekström	4 (10)	2004
=	(Canada) Bruno Spengler	4 (10)	2006
=	(United Kingdom) Gary Paffett	4 (10)	2009
=	(Canada) Bruno Spengler	4 (10)	2012
=	(Germany) Marco Wittmann	4 (10)	2014

Most wins in a season (two events)
	Country	Total (races)	Season
1	(Italy) Nicola Larini	11 (20)	1993
2	(Germany) René Rast	7 (20)	2018
3	(Germany) Hans-Joachim Stuck	7 (22)	1990
4	(Germany) Bernd Schneider	6 (16)	2000
5	(Germany) Bernd Schneider	6 (20)	1994
=	(Germany) Bernd Schneider	6 (20)	2001
7	(Germany) Armin Hahne	6 (22)	1988
8	(Germany) Bernd Schneider	6 (24)	1991
9	(United Kingdom) Gary Paffett	5 (11)	2005
10	(Italy) Nicola Larini	5 (20)	1994
11	(Germany) Klaus Ludwig	5 (24)	1992

== Constructors ==
=== Drivers' Champion from manufactures ===
Championship wins
	Driver	Total champions	DTM (1984–1996)	DTM (since 2000)	Season
1	(Germany) Mercedes-Benz	12	3	9	1992, 1994, 1995, 2000, 2001, 2003, 2005, 2006, 2010, 2015, 2018, 2021
1	(Germany) Audi	12	2	10	1990, 1991, 2002, 2004, 2007, 2008, 2009, 2011, 2013, 2017, 2019, 2020
3	(Germany) BMW	7	3	4	1984, 1987, 1989, 2012, 2014, 2016, 2022
4	(Germany) Porsche	2	0	2	2023, 2025
5	(Sweden) Volvo	1	1	0	1985
5	(United Kingdom) Rover	1	1	0	1986
5	(United States) Ford	1	1	0	1988
5	(Italy) Alfa Romeo	1	1	0	1993
5	(Germany) Opel	1	1	0	1996
5	(Germany) Lamborghini	1	0	1	2024

=== Statistics ===
As of round 8 of the 2025 season (wins till 2025 season).

Race wins
	Driver	Total DTM
1	(Germany) Mercedes-Benz	210
2	(Germany) Audi	142
3	(Germany) BMW	104
4	(Italy) Alfa Romeo	41
5	(United States) Ford	30
6	(Germany) Opel	20
7	(Germany) Porsche	15
8	(Italy) Ferrari	13
9	(Italy) Lamborghini	10
10	(United Kingdom) Rover	6
11	(Sweden) Volvo	5
12	(United Kingdom) Aston Martin	2
13	(United States) Chevrolet	1
14	(United Kingdom) McLaren	1

Pole positions
	Driver	Total DTM
1	(Germany) Mercedes-Benz	144
2	(Germany) Audi	116
4	(United States) Ford	22
5	(Italy) Alfa Romeo	20
6	(Germany) Opel	11
7	(Sweden) Volvo	6
8	(Italy) Ferrari	5
9	(United Kingdom) Rover	4
10	(Italy) Lamborghini	1

Fastest laps
	Driver	Total DTM
1	(Germany) Mercedes-Benz	174
2	(Germany) BMW	73
3	(Germany) Audi	60
4	(Italy) Alfa Romeo	46
5	(United States) Ford	22
6	(Germany) Opel	19
7	(Sweden) Volvo	7
8	(United States) Chevrolet	4
9	(United Kingdom) Rover	2

=== Manufactures Champion ===
Rank	Manufacturer	Titles	Years
1	(Germany) Mercedes-Benz	18	1991, 1992, 1994, 1995（DTM+ITC）, 2000, 2001, 2002, 2003, 2005, 2006, 2008, 2009, 2010, 2018, 2021, 2024, 2025
2	(Germany) Audi	9	2004, 2007, 2011, 2014, 2016, 2017, 2019, 2020, 2022
3	(Germany) BMW	5	2012, 2013, 2015
7	(Italy) Alfa Romeo	1	1993
7	(Germany) Opel	1	1996
7	(Germany) Porsche	1	2023
