= Natel =

Generic trademark

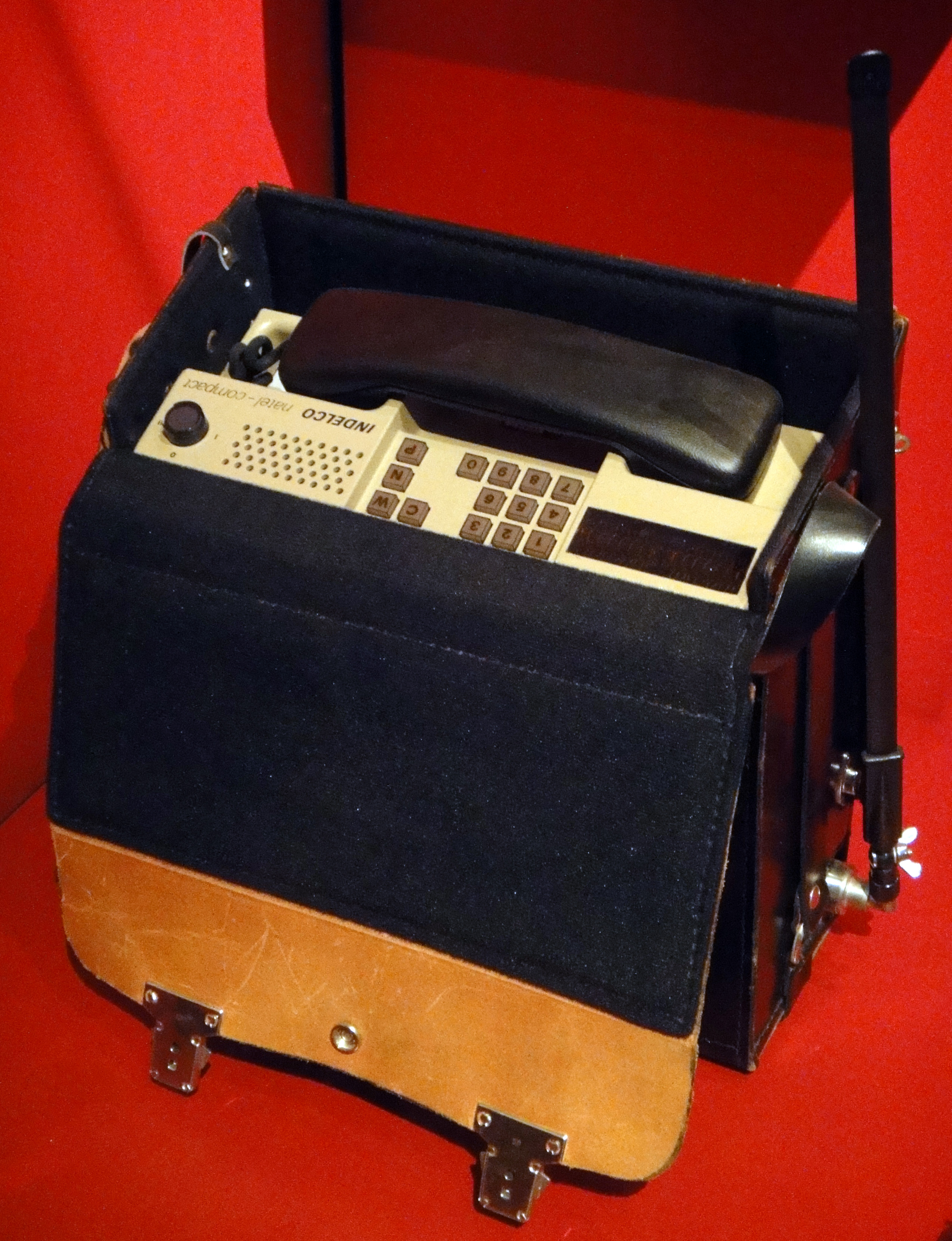
A Natel B device, released in 1980

Natel is a generic trademark used in Switzerland and in Liechtenstein for 'mobile phone'.

The word was coined in 1975, when the Swiss Postal Telegraph and Telephone introduced a mobile phone service for vehicles in Switzerland: Nationales Auto-TELefonnetz, or "National Car Telephone Network". When the PTT was dismantled in 1998, it split into two public service companies.

The telecom corporation, Swisscom, continued to develop the Swiss mobile network, and registered the word Natel as a trademark. It remains a brand of the company's mobile telephony services to this day.

In Switzerland, "Natel" is still used as a synonym for mobile (or cell) phone across the country. Like many words with origins in a specific culture, this word is unknown to French, German, and Italian speakers outside of Switzerland.

== History ==
Analog Networks:

- NATEL A (first subnet, 1978)
- NATEL B (1983), another 12 kg portable suitcase radiotelephone
- NATEL C (1987), a 1G NMT-based system with analog voice transmission and digital switching and control information

Digital Networks:

- NATEL D (1993), a 2G GSM network
  - Since the mid-1990s SMS
  - Since 2001 2.5G GPRS
  - Since 2004 3G UMTS
  - Since 2012 4G LTE
  - Since 2019 5G NR

Since the liberalization of the market in 1997, two other mobile operators have appeared in Switzerland.

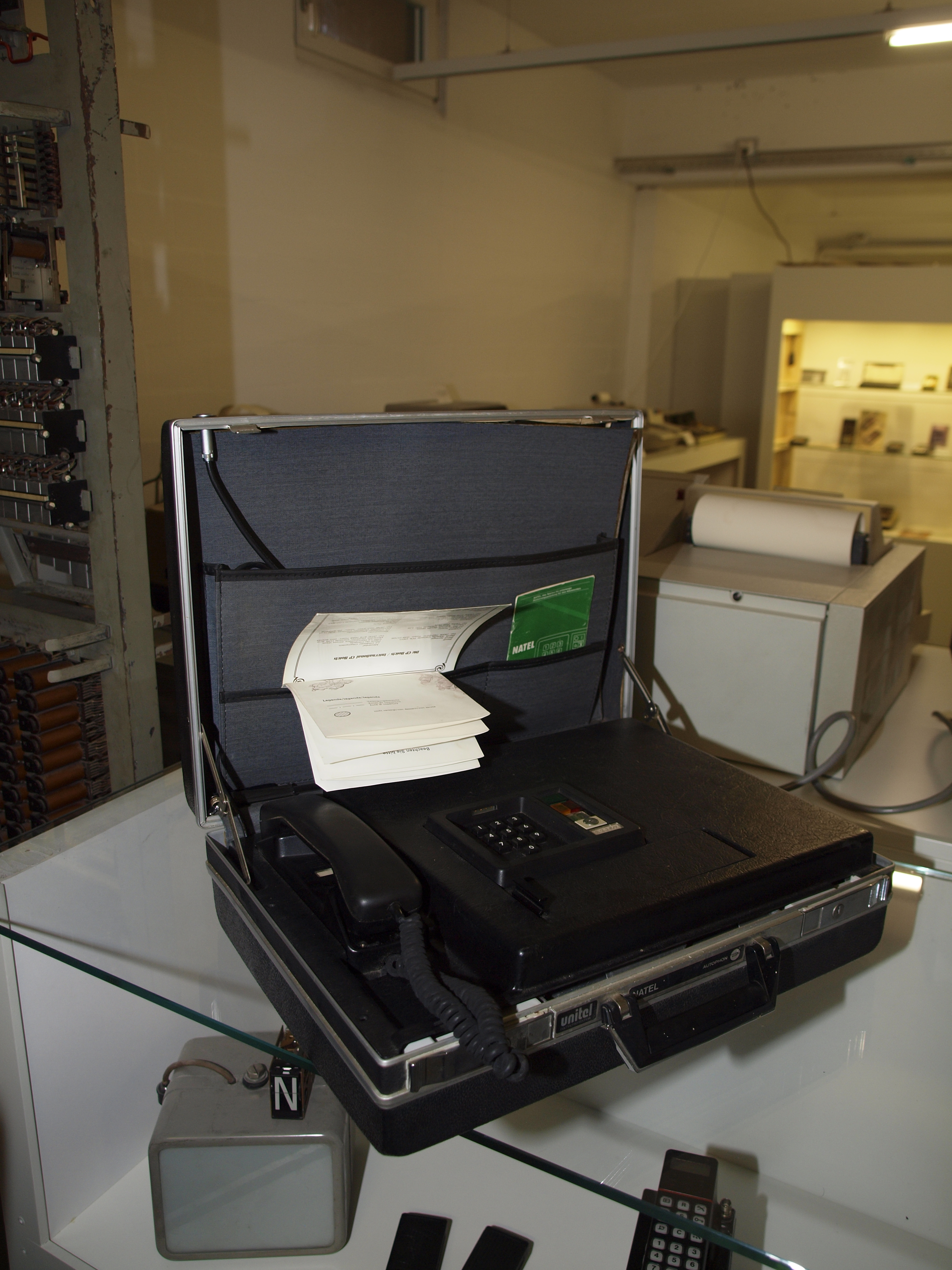
NATEL A

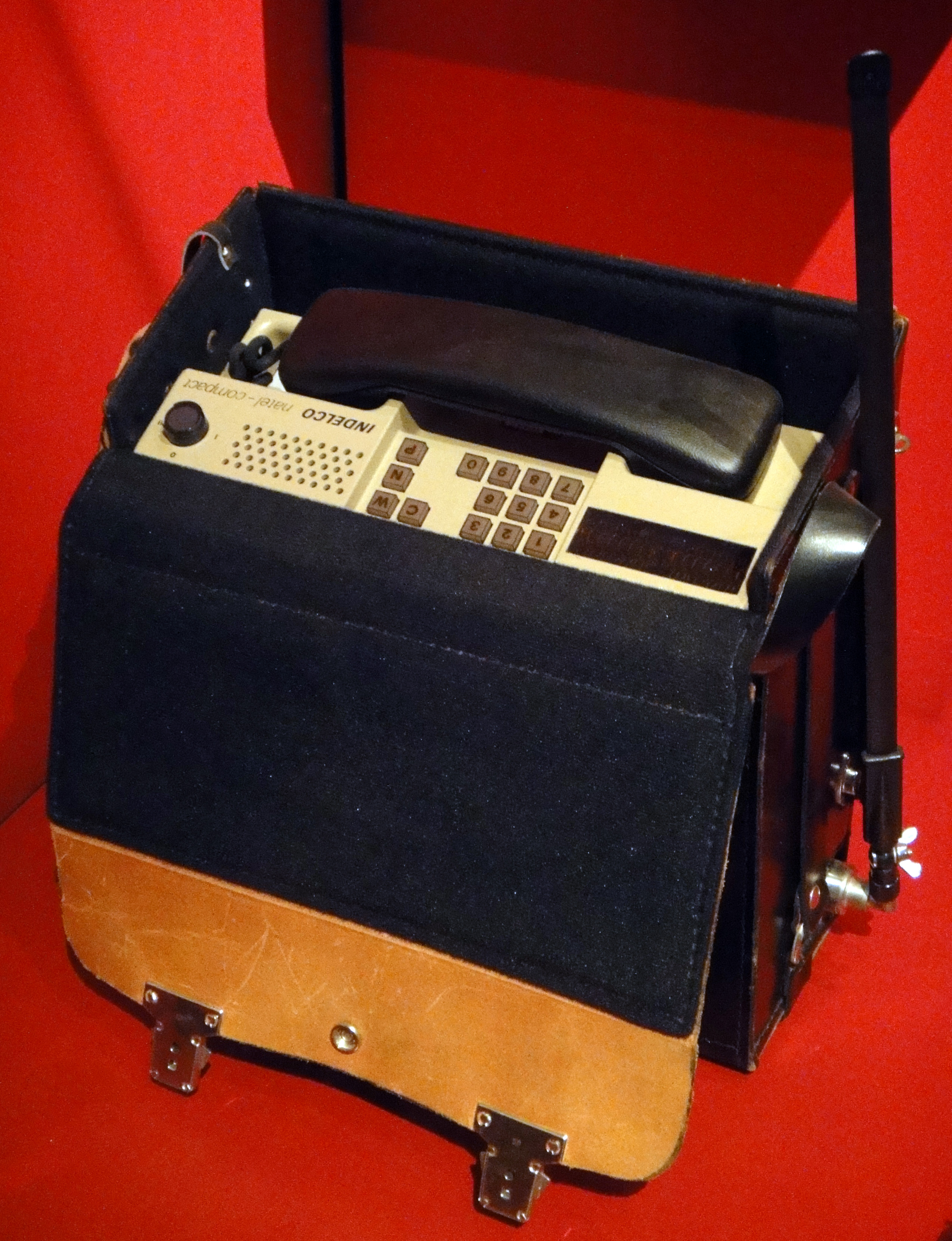
NATEL B (Indelco Compact 801625)

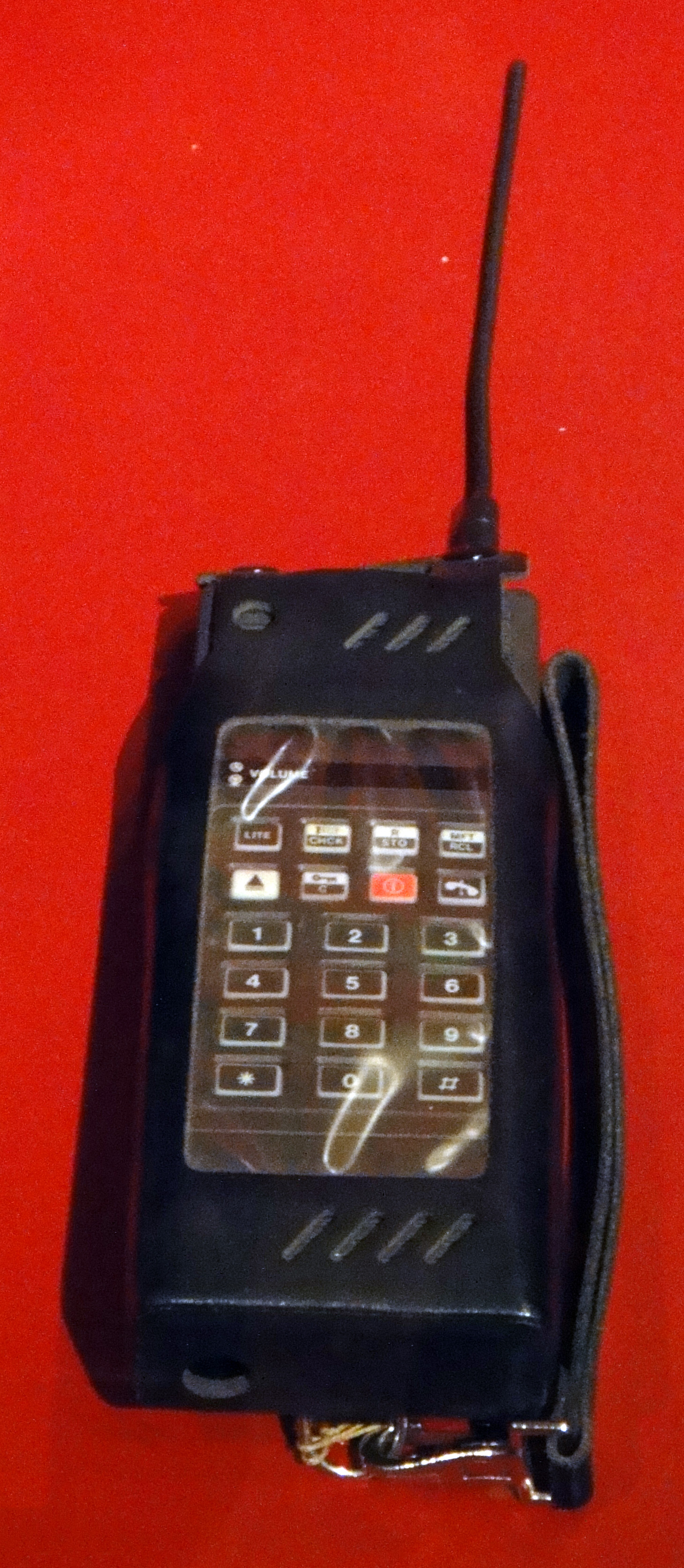
NATEL C (Technophone PC 107-3)
