= UPC Switzerland =

Cable provider in Switzerland

- Type: Subsidiary
- Industry: Telecommunications
- Founded: 1994; 32 years ago
- Defunct: May 23, 2022
- Fate: Discontinued in favor of Sunrise
- Successor: Sunrise
- Headquarters: Zurich, Switzerland
- Key people: Baptiest Coopmans (CEO)
- Revenue: 1.296 billion CHF (2018)
- Number of employees: approx. 1,500 (2018)
- Parent: UPC Broadband
- Website: www.upc.ch

UPC was the largest cable operator in Switzerland with around 1.1 million residential and business customers and was formed in 1994 through the merger of several cable operators. UPC has been a subsidiary of Liberty Global from 2005 until its discontinuation in 2022.

On 27 February 2019, the Swiss telecommunications company Sunrise Communications announced the planned purchase of UPC Switzerland from Liberty Global, with purchasing price of 6.3 billion CHF, but it was cancelled in December. In August 2020, the reverse operation occurred, Liberty Global, UPC's parent company, announced that it will acquire Sunrise for $7.4 billion. On May 23, 2022, UPC was discontinued in favor of Sunrise.

== History ==
In the 1930s, the first cable network operators started to broadcast a variety of radio channels to households via cable. One of these cable network operators, Rediffusion S.A., which was established in 1931, transmitted radio programmes via wire broadcasting. At the end of the 1950s, Rediffusion S.A. broadcast the first black and white television channels from the Uetliberg. In 1994, Rediffusion and other independent cable network companies merged to form Cablecom, owned by Siemens, VEBA and Swisscom.

Cablecom acquired the successful Internet service provider SwissOnline in 1998. Over the following years the cable operator grew by acquiring various cable network companies including, for instance, Balcab and Sitel. These takeovers allowed Cablecom to extend its network in further parts of Switzerland In 2000, the previous owners of Cablecom sold out to British-American NTL for 5.8 billion Swiss francs. In the years that followed, operational activities were sustainably improved. In the wake of financial difficulties NTL sold Cablecom to a group of banks and private investors in 2003.

The owners planned to go public with Cablecom in the middle of October 2005. After Liberty Global Europe, a wholly owned subsidiary of Liberty Global, acquired Cablecom for 2.8 billion on 30 September 2005, the planned IPO was withdrawn. In the years that followed, Cablecom invested in expanding its network. In 2007, the company launched high-definition television (HDTV). Two years later, Cablecom introduced its first combination deals (package with Internet, telephony and television). In 2010, Cablecom launched the DigiCard enabling customers to enjoy digital TV without having to connect an additional device to their television set. In 2011, Cablecom began offering Video on Demand with 3D content.

Cablecom was relaunched as upc cablecom in April 2011. In the course of rebranding the red wrench was replaced by a new logo in the form of a lotus blossom. A coloured version of the light blue logo used by UPC Broadband (at that time the operating company of Liberty Global).

On 14 January 2013, UPC introduced the Horizon set-top box. This system comprises a set-top box for digital television and HDTV, combined with an Internet modem with WLAN, IP telephony and a hard disk recorder.

On 1 August 2015, Liberty Global brought together the two sister companies, UPC Cablecom and UPC Austria, to create a joint regional organisation based in Zurich.

Since 25 May 2016, UPC Cablecom has been known simply as UPC.

On 1 August 2018 UPC Austria was taken over by T-Mobile Austria and in May 2019, the new brand identity Magenta Telekom was presented.

On 1 September 2018, Severina Pascu took over the role of CEO from Eric Tveter, who had been CEO since 2009.

On 27 February 2019, Sunrise Communications AG announced it intent to buy UPC Switzerland. The merger was cancelled on 18 December 2019.

On May 23, 2022, UPC was discontinued in favor of Sunrise.

== Company details ==
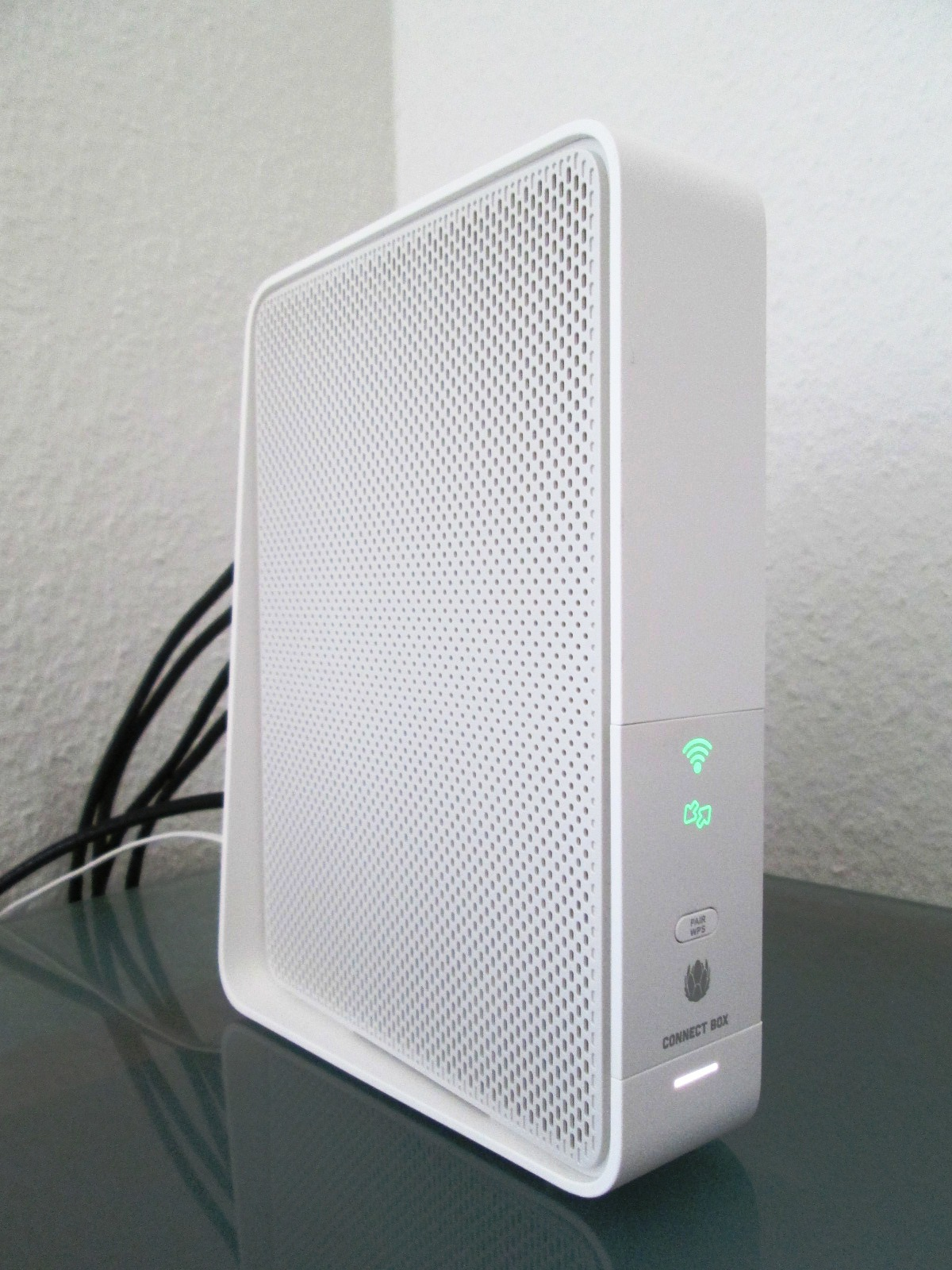
UPC Connect Box CPE with improved Wi-Fi (2016)

As of 30 June 2019, UPC supplied 1.1 million Swiss customers with over 2.4 million services (approx. 1,041,000 television, 677,000 broadband Internet, 511,000 fixed network phone and 173,000 mobile customers). UPC currently employs around 1,500 people in Switzerland.

== Products ==
=== Television and radio ===
UPC broadcasts digitalised television and radio channels. The foundations for this were laid in 1999 when 32 digital channels were broadcast in parallel to the analogue offer for the first time. In November 2012, UPC abolished basic encryption for its basic TV package comprising 55 digital TV channels and 100 digital radio stations. Despite the digitisation, at least 36 analogue TV channels and 34 analogue radio stations were still broadcast via UPC's cable network depending on the region. In the Federal Act on Radio and Television the Federal Council prescribed a must-carry list for analogue channels. This included analogue channels stipulated by the Federal Council that had to be broadcast throughout Switzerland by UPC and other cable television providers. This must-carry rule was changed following the amendment of the DETEC Ordinance on Radio and Television on 13 May 2013.

As a consequence of this, only the SBC channels and licensed regional channels as well as youth channel Joiz had to be broadcast in analogue. This obligation ended on 31 December 2014 (Joiz: 21 March 2015) or earlier if a cable operator offered a basic offer at no additional cost and a digital/analogue converter. And so UPC completely digitised central Switzerland in autumn 2014 as part of a pilot project – and on 7 July 2015 the last analogue channels were switched off by UPC Cablecom in Ticino. The abolition of basic encryption also made it possible for customers to choose their preferred device for reception (TV, receiver, recorder, DigiCard). In order to take advantage of the basic digital offer, all that is needed is an active cable connection, an aerial cable and a television set with an integrated DVB-C receiver or a converter for older television sets. In order to receive additional offers via the cable network a receiver is required – either a set-top box (recorder/receiver) or a SmartCard.

=== Happy Home ===
At the start of 2019, UPC replaced the bundles previously known as “Connect & Play”. Three levels correspond to download speeds measured in Mbit/s (As of 31 March 2019 the maximum speed was 600 Mbit/s). The packages include Internet access, the UPC TV package and a fixed network connection – with an option including free calls within Switzerland and to the EU also available. At the same time, the UPC Connect App was also introduced in order to improve customers’ wifi coverage by helping them set up the Connect Box and scanning the wifi coverage in their homes. Power-line communication adapters can also create Wi-Fi hotspots in other rooms.

=== UPC TV and MySports ===
In October 2018, UPC TV (the successor to the Horizon HD recorder) was launched. The box – including features such as voice control, personal recommendations, a search function and personal profiles – was introduced in April 2019. However, for users, UPC TV is not limited to the TV Box. The UPC TV App can also be used to watch TV, independent of the platform. As of 30 June 2019, around 200,000 UPC TV boxes were already on the market in Switzerland.

The MySports sports channel on the other hand was launched in September 2017 and offers different sports, such as Swiss National League ice hockey as well as Formula E. In August 2018, MySports One was marketed to all UPC TV customers. MySports Go, launched in September 2018, is the result of a partnership between MySports and Sky and is available for owners of the Sky Sport App.

UPC was the first company in Switzerland to introduce a flat rate model for films and series, MyPrime. At the end of 2016, more than 10,000 items of content such as classic films, series, documentaries and children's programmes were available to customers in German-, French- and Italian-speaking Switzerland.

=== Internet ===
UPC offers broadband Internet via its cable network (fibre optic cable network). The company has over 686,000 customers in this segment (as of 31 March 2019). The cable network consists of 95% optical fibre cable and 5% coaxial cable, known as hybrid fibre coax (HFC). The Internet service is operated with the DOCSIS 3.0 standard.

Since November 2012, the cable connection from UPC has also included a digital basic offer for existing customers with 2 Mbit/s Internet access as well as a TV offer, and since January 2015 a landline telephone connection. In addition, the UPC TV App can also be used with this offer.

=== Wi-Free ===
Since autumn 2014, UPC has offered its customers Switzerland's biggest free wifi network with Wi-Free. This means UPC customers can browse the web at around 500,000 locations in Switzerland and over 2 million locations in Europe free of charge on their smartphone, tablet etc.

=== Phone ===
==== Fixed network ====
Since July 2003, UPC has had a telephony offering with Voice over Cable. 514,000 customers use their cable to make telephone calls (correct as of 31 March 2019).

==== Mobile services ====
Since April 2014, UPC has offered Mobile services to its existing customers. Since January 2019, UPC offers its Mobile services using the existing Swisscom mobile network (prior it was Salt) and is thus an MVNO (Mobile Virtual Network Operator) provider. Apart from the use of Swisscom's mobile phone masts, the company provides all services itself. In the second quarter of 2019, 173,000 people had a Mobile subscription from UPC.

== Business customers ==
UPC Business has offered communication solutions for companies since 1999 – including small- and medium-sized enterprises, cantonal banks, hospitals, public administrations etc. – and plays an important role in the Swiss B2B market. In the finance sector, the company now provides connectivity and managed services to more than half of all cantonal banks. Further customers include SV (Switzerland) AG (IP telephony solutions and LAN management) and the BKW Group (software-defined WAN).

== Competitive environment ==
=== Bundles ===
UPC's strongest competitor is Swisscom. At UPC, such bundles include television, Internet and telephony services. Comparable offers have been available from Swisscom and Sunrise since December 2011. Salt entered the fixed network business in March 2018 with “Salt Fibre”.

=== Television ===
UPC is the second largest provider with 1.041 million TV customers. (correct as of 30 June 2019). This corresponds to a 26 per cent share of the Swiss TV market. The leader in this category is Swisscom with just under 35 per cent. Sunrise has just a 5 per cent share of the TV market. Added together, the other cable operators make up a 26 per cent share, like UPC. The remaining 8 per cent is accounted for by satellite and antenna reception.

=== Internet ===
UPC's fibre optic cable network supplies around 3 million homes in Switzerland and offers Internet speeds of 600 Mbit/s downstream and 60 Mbit/s upstream (correct as of March 2019) throughout the whole network – both in the city and in the countryside. The highest speed Internet connections from Swisscom and also from Sunrise are currently 100 Mbit/s (VDSL) and 1 Gbit/s (FTTH) respectively.

UPC Switzerland's speeds are made possible by a hybrid network with a high fibre proportion in combination with coaxial cable. This means that the existing Internet capacities can be increased continuously on the existing network as required – by expanding the frequency range or bundling channels. The status quo of 600 Mbit/s can therefore be adjusted to meet future customer needs – without additional construction work in streets or houses being necessary.

=== Phone ===
UPC, Sunrise and Swisscom offer various subscriptions for fixed network as well as for mobile telephony. All providers have special tariffs that vary according to the type of subscription.
