= Sunrise LLC =

Swiss telecommunications company

- Type: Gesellschaft mit beschränkter Haftung
- Industry: Telecommunications
- Predecessor: diAx, UPC Switzerland
- Founded: 2000; 26 years ago
- Headquarters: Opfikon, Switzerland
- Key people: André Krause (CEO); Michael T. Fries (Chairman of the Board)
- Products: Landline & Mobile Telephony; Landline & Mobile Internet; Digital Television; IT Services & Networking Solutions
- Revenue: CHF3.038 billion (2023)
- Number of employees: c. 2600 (2023)
- ASN: 6730
- Traffic Levels: 100–200 Gbps
- Website: www.sunrise.ch

Sunrise LLC, doing business as Sunrise, is a Swiss telecommunications provider based in Zurich. It provides mobile, TV and landline phone and internet services. Since February 2019, Sunrise headquarters are located at Thurgauerstrasse 101b, Glattpark Opfikon.

Formerly a subsidiary of TDC A/S, Sunrise had been owned by CVC Capital Partners until 2015. In February 2015, CVC realised an IPO on the SIX Swiss Exchange. Since then, Sunrise stocks were publicly traded at the Swiss Stock Exchange. In August 2020, Liberty Global announced that it would acquire Sunrise for $7.4 billion. The transaction was completed on November 11, 2020. In November 2024, Liberty Global completed the spin-off of Sunrise, turning it into an independent public entity operating autonomously in the Swiss telecommunications market.

== History ==
The current company was created out of the fusion between diAx and the original Sunrise Communications in 2001. diAx was founded in 1997, started operating in December 1998, and belonged to 40% of the American SBC Communications, 50% of Swiss energy suppliers, and 10% of the Swiss companies Federal RWE AG. Sunrise belonged mainly to the BT Group and the Danish Tele Danmark (TDC A/S), with Migros and the Swiss Federal Railways as junior partners. In 2000, the two companies wanted to avoid paying the bill for the UMTS licenses. Through the merger of diAx and sunrise, there were only four applicants registered for the four UMTS licenses. After the fusion, the new brand name sunrise and the new company TDC Switzerland AG became the 100% subsidiary of TDC A/S.

At the end of January 2006, Nordic Telephone Company (NTC) acquired 88.2% of the shares of TDC A/S, Sunrise's parent company. On 4 October 2007, the name of the company was changed to Sunrise Communications AG and the brand name Sunrise was capitalised. As a new logo, the "Sunrise" label is written in the Frutiger font style, which is intended to underline the Swiss anchorage of the company. In addition, its new motto is "Brave. Vital. Honest. Easy." On 29 September 2008, Sunrise announced the acquisition of the competitor Tele2 Switzerland. Tele2, which had more than 491,000 customers, initially remained a brand and the employees were taken over. As of 1 November 2011, however, license rights expired on the name "Tele2", and it was changed to "Tele4U".

In November 2009, France Télécom and TDC announced the intention to merge their Swiss subsidiaries Orange Communications and Sunrise. At the new company, France Télécom should hold 75% of shares and TDC 25%. Combined, the new company would have a market share of around 38% for mobile communications and around 13% for broadband connections. On 22 April 2010, the Competition Commission (WEKO) prohibited the merger. The reason for this was the market dominance in the mobile market of the merged company together with Swisscom. In addition, the most active network operator in the market would be excluded from the market. In September 2010, TDC A/S and the Luxembourg-based private equity firm CVC Capital Partners, announced that they had reached an agreement to purchase Sunrise through CVC for CHF3.3 billion. The transaction was executed after approval by the Swiss competition and regulatory authorities on 28 October 2010. In 2015, Sunrise went on the stock exchange. The German telecommunication provider Freenet has been the main shareholder since 2016.

In February 2019, Sunrise agreed on the acquisition of UPC Switzerland from Liberty Global for CHF6.3 billion, pending financing and approval of the Swiss trade commission. On 27 February 2019, Sunrise Communications announced the planned acquisition of UPC Switzerland from the British media group Liberty Global for CHF 6.3 billion (around EUR 5.5 billion). Shortly after the agreement was signed, the main shareholder Freenet demanded renegotiations. The takeover application was examined by the Competition Commission and approved unconditionally. In September 2019, the Competition Commission granted its approval. The next step was for Sunrise shareholders to agree to the required capital increase. When it became clear in October 2019 that the takeover deal would not receive a majority of shareholder votes, the extraordinary general meeting was cancelled and the contract with Liberty Global, the owner of UPC, was terminated. As of 12 November 2019, Sunrise canceled the share purchase agreement with Liberty Global.

At the end of May 2020, it became known that Sunrise was able to achieve partial success in a far-reaching lawsuit against Swisscom regarding the allegation of abuse of its dominant position in the market for broadband Internet access (ADSL) in the years 2001 to 2007 and their resulting pricing policy. This allegation was confirmed by the Swiss Competition Commission in 2009 and Swisscom was subsequently fined around CHF 220 million. Swisscom lodged an appeal but the appeal court confirmed the judgement in a slightly milder form. Sunrise had demanded damages totalling CHF 350 million excluding interest.

In August 2020, Liberty Global announced that it will be acquiring Sunrise for $7.4 billion. Liberty Global attempted to buy Sunrise multiple times before; This was completed in November 2020.

In November 2024, Liberty Global announced the completion of the spin-off transaction of Sunrise. This transaction resulted in Sunrise becoming an independent public entity, operating autonomously in the Swiss telecommunications market. The move allowed Liberty Global shareholders to participate directly in Sunrise's future performance. In November 2024 it returned to the Swiss stock market, and was valued at $3.26 billion. It had previously been listed from 2015 to 2021. It listed on the SIX exchange in Zurich.
