= Swisscom =

Swiss telecommunication company

Swisscom AG
- Type: Public; state-owned enterprise
- Traded as: SIX: SCMN; SMI component
- Predecessor: Telecom PTT
- Founded: October 1, 1997; 29 years ago
- Headquarters: Worblaufen, Ittigen (canton of Bern), Switzerland
- Key people: Christoph Aeschlimann (CEO); Michael Rechsteiner (Chairman)
- Revenue: ▲CHF 11.07 billion (2023)
- Operating income: ▲CHF 2.205 billion (2023)
- Net income: ▲CHF 1.711 billion (2023)
- Total assets: ▲CHF 24.75 billion (2023)
- Total equity: ▲CHF 11.62 billion (2023)
- Owner: Swiss Government (51%)
- Number of employees: 19,729 (2023)
- Subsidiaries: Fastweb (100%)
- ASN: 3303
- Traffic Levels: 1Tbps+
- Website: swisscom.ch

Swisscom AG is a major telecommunications provider in Switzerland. Its headquarters are in Worblaufen, near Bern. The Swiss government owns 51% of Swisscom. According to its own published data, Swisscom's market shares in Switzerland are 56% for mobile, 50% for broadband and 37% for TV telecommunications. Its Italian subsidiary, Fastweb, has 16% share of the private broadband market and 29% of the corporate broadband market. It is also active in the mobile market.

The Swiss telegraph network was first set up in 1852, followed by telephones in 1877. The two networks were combined with the postal service in 1920 to form Postal Telegraph and Telephone (PTT). The Swiss telecommunications market was deregulated in 1997. Telecom PTT was spun off and rebranded Swisscom ahead of a partial privatisation in 1997. The present-day Swisscom owns the protected brand NATEL, which is used only in Switzerland. In 2001, 25% of Swisscom Mobile was sold to Vodafone. In 2007, Swisscom acquired a majority stake in Italy's second-biggest telecom company Fastweb.

== History ==
=== Pioneers (1852–1911) ===
Switzerland entered the telecommunications era in 1851, with the passage of legislation giving the Swiss government control over the development of a telegraph network throughout the country. The government initially planned to create three primary telegraph lines, as well as a number of secondary networks. To lay the infrastructural groundwork for the system, the government established the Atelier Fédéral de Construction des Télégraphes (Federal Workshop for the Construction of Telegraphs).

In July 1852, the first leg of the country's telegraph system — between St. Gallen and Zürich — went into operation. By the end of that year, most of the country's main cities had been connected to the telegraph system. In 1855, the network was extended with the first underwater cable, connecting Winkel-Stansstad and Bauen-Flüelen. Night service was also launched that year, starting in Basel, St. Gallen and Bellinzona. Telegraph traffic continued to rise in the following decade, but was nevertheless overtaken by the telephone.

Switzerland's entry into the telephone age came in 1877, when the first experimental telephone lines appeared, starting with a line linking the post office building with the Federal Palace and then with a link, using the existing telegraph line, between Bern and Thun. The following year, the government passed legislation establishing a monopoly on the country's telephone network. By 1880, Switzerland's first private network had been created in Zürich. This was a central system with the capacity for 200 lines.

Basel, Bern and Geneva all launched their own local networks between 1881 and 1882. One year later, the first intercity telephone line was established, linking Zürich's private exchange with Winterthur's public system. Telephone numbers were introduced in 1890, replacing the initial system whereby callers had been able to ask for their party by name. Switzerland began testing its first public phone booths in 1904. Initially restricted to local calls, public telephones allowed national calling for the first time in 1907.

=== 1912–1965 ===
The first automatic telephone exchanges were installed by private networks in 1912. By 1917, a semi-automatic exchange had been installed in Zürich-Hottingen. In 1920, the Swiss government created the Swiss PTT, combining the country's postal services and telegraph and telephone systems into a single, government-controlled entity. PTT began telex services in 1934, and by 1936 had linked up the cities of Zürich, Basel and Bern, which were then linked via Zürich to the international market.

=== Space-age communications (1966–1981) ===
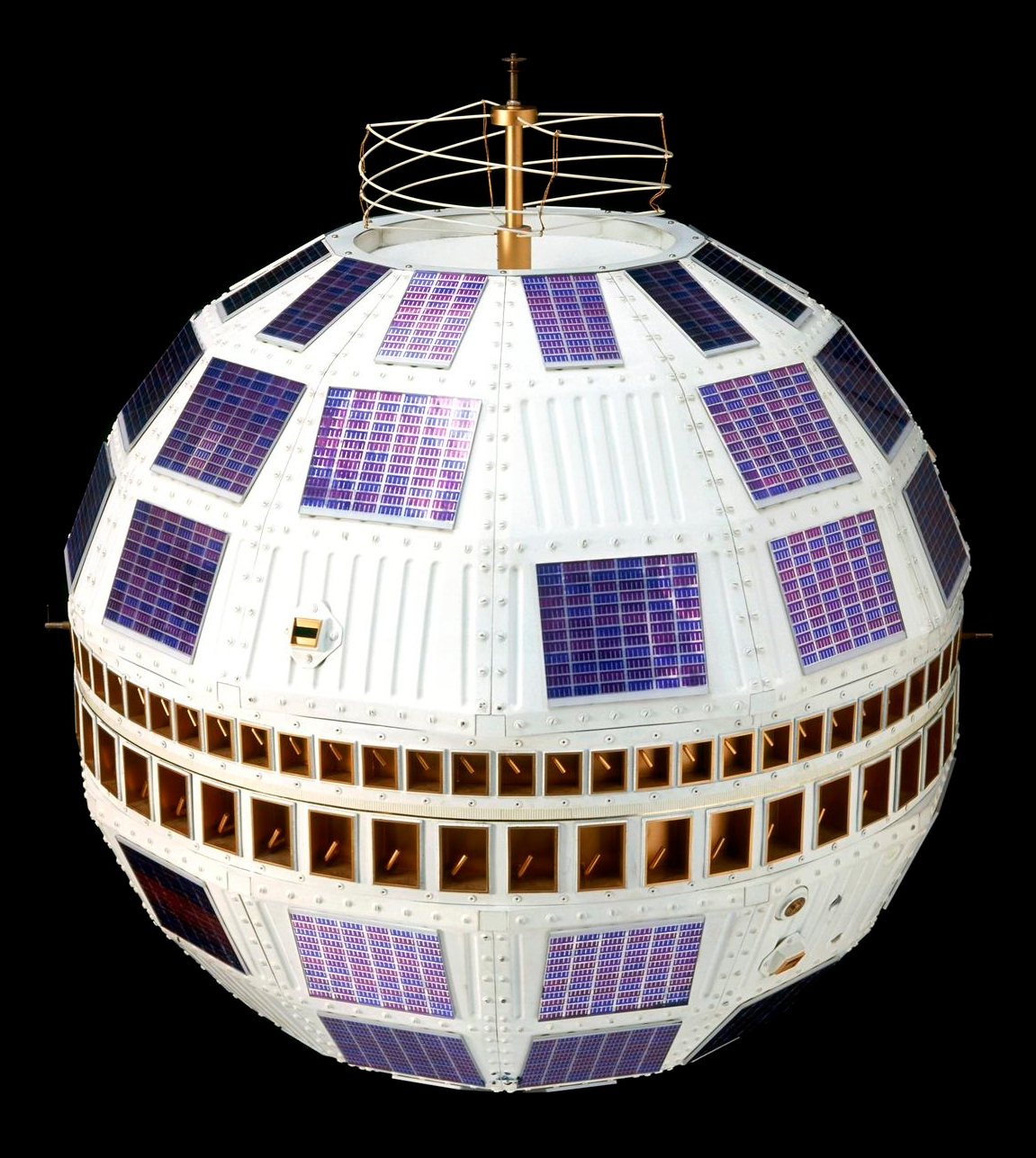
The original Telstar, the first telecommunications satellite to be launched into space

Telstar – the first telecommunications satellite – was launched into space in 1962. In 1974, the Leuk satellite earth station went into operation in the canton of Valais.

=== Moving towards mobile in the 1980s ===
Automation enabled PTT to introduce pulse-metering for local calls in 1963. In 1966, PTT introduced automated international dialing services, initially from Montreux and achieved full coverage in 1982. In 1970, PTT led an inter-organisational work group of Swiss telecommunications players, in an effort to create an integrated digital telecommunications network (IFS). In 1976, the company launched facsimile transmission services from its customer service centers. Two years later, PTT established its first mobile telephone network, called NATEL. In 1980, PTT enabled facsimile transmission for the home and office market. The telecommunications business became known as Swiss Telecom PTT.

=== Public company in the 21st Century ===
The company initially formed a Unisource partnership with the Netherlands' KPN and Sweden's Telia. Although the Unisource partnership attempted to enter a number of markets around the world, including Malaysia and India, it deintegrated after several years of losses. In 1996, Telecom PTT's set up the service provider Blue Window (later Bluewin), which became the country's leading Internet service provider (ISP). In 1997, Swiss government passed new legislation fully deregulating the Swiss telecommunications market. As part of that process, Telecom PTT was transformed into a special public limited company, its name was changed to Swisscom on 1 October 1997, its shares were listed on the Swiss Stock Exchange, and it conducted a public offering of its shares in 1998.

In 1999, the company acquired Germany's publicly listed Debitel, then the third-largest mobile services provider on the German market. The company formed six primary business units, and in 2001, it sold a 25% stake in Swisscom Mobile to England's Vodafone. Vodafone was a major investor in the 3G (third-generation) mobile telephone technology. In 2000, Swisscom won a UMTS (Universal Mobile Telecommunications Systems) license. In the early 2000s, Swisscom also started rolling out DSL (digital subscriber line) broadband technology with 200,000 subscribers by the beginning of 2003. In 2002, Swisscom Eurospot was founded, initially specialising in providing High-Speed Internet Access (HSIA) services to hotel guests 4- and 5-star hotels around Europe. Later becoming Swisscom Hospitality Services, it is based in Geneva. In May 2003, its newly formed subsidiary, Swisscom Eurospot, merged with the Netherlands' Aervik.

=== Modern times ===
The former state-owned PTT was privatized in several stages from 1988 onward and became a public limited company with special legal status in October 1998. The Swiss Confederation currently holds 51.0% of the share capital. The Telecommunications Enterprise Act limits outside participation to 49.9% of the share capital. In its 5 April 2006 message, the Federal Council proposed Swisscom to be completely privatized. On 10 May 2006, the National Council declined the proposal. On 20 May 2006, the Advisory Committee of the Council of States advised the Council of States to endorse the proposal – but only so that it could be referred back to the Federal Council for revision.

In 2007, the 25% stake in Swisscom Mobile AG, which had been sold to Vodafone six years earlier, was repurchased and the mobile telephony, fixed network and solutions businesses were merged organisationally into the new company Swisscom (Switzerland) Ltd. In the first half of 2007, Swisscom acquired a majority holding in the Italian telecommunications provider Fastweb, owner of the second largest broadband network in Italy. During the offer period, Swisscom acquired 80.7% of Fastweb's share capital, making it 82.4% of Fastweb shares by the cut-off date of 22 May. The total transaction amounted to 6.9 billion Swiss Francs. Swisscom announced its new visual identity on 14 December 2007. The previous sub-brands of Swisscom Fixnet, Swisscom Mobile and Swisscom Solutions ceased to exist on 1 January 2008. As part of the restructuring, Swisscom employed agency Moving Brands to redesign its logo and transformed it into a moving picture element, an innovation for Switzerland and the industry.

On 23 July 2013, the CEO of Swisscom, Carsten Schloter was found dead from an apparent suicide and Urs Schaeppi was appointed interim CEO. Schaeppi's appointment was made permanent in November 2013. As of June 2018, Swisscom ranks on Forbes "The World's Largest Public Companies" list, the Global 2000, at number 520. In June 2015, Swisscom Hospitality Services became part of a new company, Hoist Group, following its acquisition by the Sweden-based HoistLocatel. In June 2018, Danish software firm Nordija partnered with Swisscom to develop TVaaS 2.0.

In 2019, Swisscom paid CHF 240 million to TX Group for the acquisition of the outstanding 31% stake in Swisscom Directories AG. On 17 April 2019, Swisscom began to deploy its 5G network. At present, the company delivers 5G service in 110 cities and villages including Zürich, Geneva and Bern as well as rural and touristic regions. In June 2019, Swisscom, SK Telecom and Elisa together launched the world's first 5G roaming service. From 17 July 2019, Swisscom customers with a 5G mobile phone were given access to the new 5G data network in Finland and by the end of July in South Korea. At the same time, Swisscom customers database exceeded 6 million mobile subscriptions.

On 1 June 2022, Urs Schaeppi stepped down from his position as CEO of Swisscom and was succeeded by Christoph Aeschlimann. On 15 March 2024, Swisscom signed a binding purchase proposal to acquire 100% of Vodafone Italia for €8 billion, with the goal of merging it with Fastweb. The transaction was completed on 31 December 2024. As part of the agreement, Vodafone will continue to provide certain services to Fastweb, as well as grant the use of its brand for a maximum period of five years. On 3 April 2024, Fastweb also entered the electricity market.

A July 2024 opinion poll revealed that a majority of Swiss voters oppose the complete privatization of Swisscom whereby the Swiss government would sell its majority stake. 67% of respondents expressed opposition to the sale of the federal government's stake in the telecommunications company, while only 26% were in favor (the rest were undecided). This opposition was consistent across supporters of all major political parties and linguistic regions of the country. In September 2024, the Antitrust Authority published a notice of investigation and launched an inquiry. Swisscom announced that the European Commission had approved the acquisition of Vodafone Italia under the Foreign Subsidies Regulation. The transaction was also approved by AGCOM and AGCM in November and December 2024, respectively. On 31 December 2024, Swisscom, through Fastweb, completed the acquisition of Vodafone Italia, giving rise to Fastweb + Vodafone.

== Business areas ==
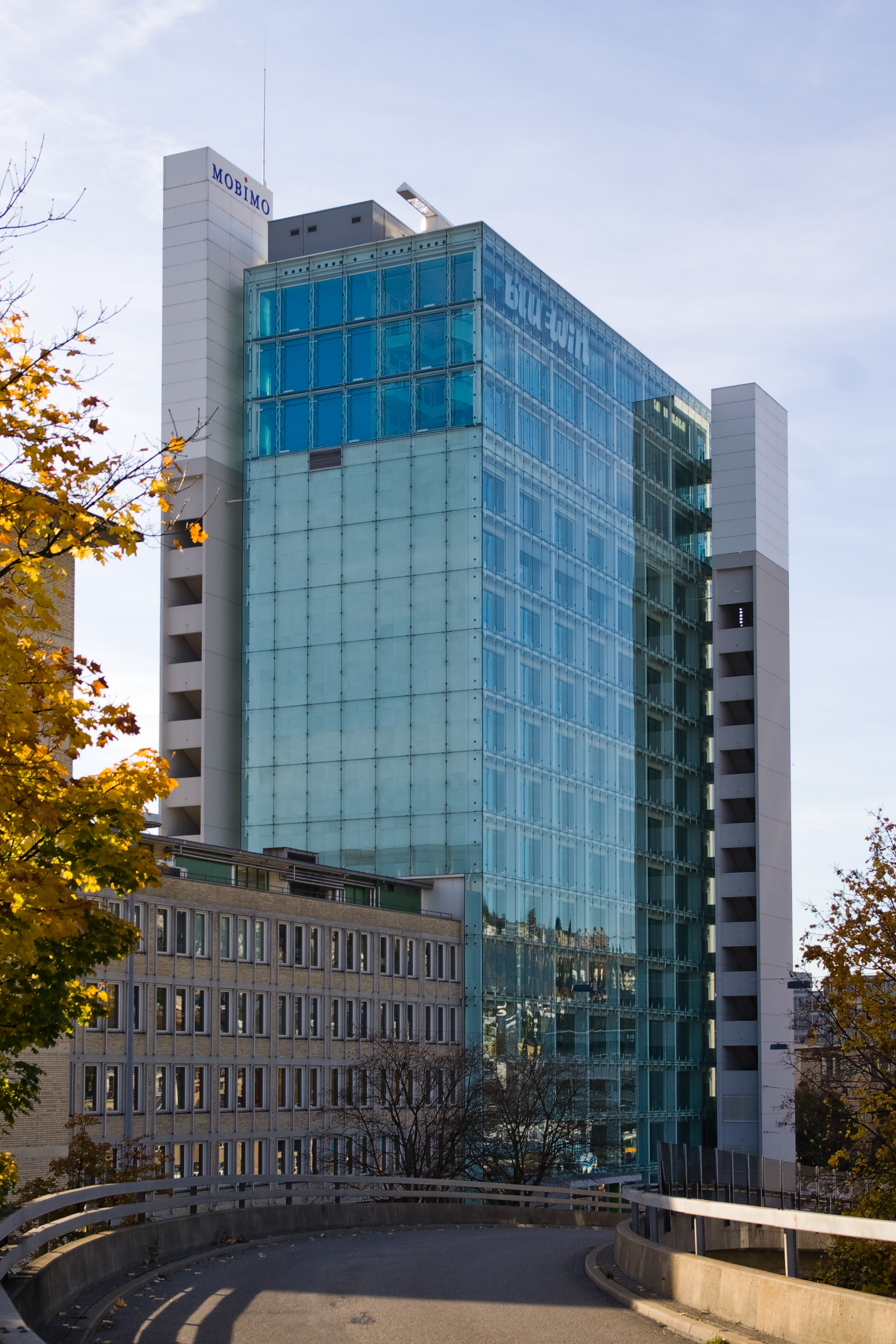
Bluewin tower in Zürich

Swisscom consists of the customer segments Residential Customers, Business Customers & Wholesale and IT, Network & Infrastructure. The Group also comprises the Digital Business division and Group companies such as Fastweb in Italy. In addition, there are other Group companies in the individual business lines.

=== Swisscom (Switzerland) Ltd ===
As of 1 January 2008, all operational activities of Swisscom Ltd in Switzerland were outsourced to Swisscom (Switzerland) Ltd. While Swisscom Ltd has since operated purely as a holding company, the activities of its wholly owned subsidiary Swisscom (Switzerland) Ltd encompass the former Fixnet, Mobile and Solutions business units, whose activities have been restructured into Residential Customers and Business Customers according to customer segment. In addition, the IT platforms and the fixed-network and mobile communications infrastructure have been merged into the IT, Network & Infrastructure division.

==== Residential customers ====
The Residential Customers segment comprises mobile and fixed-network telephony, IPTV digital TV (blue TV) and the provision of broadband internet access (DSL). Swisscom combined its entertainment offering under the umbrella of the "blue" brand from 2020. The previous names "Swisscom TV", "Bluewin", "Teleclub" and "Kitag Kinos" have disappeared.

==== Business customers ====
The Business Customers segment helps business customers to plan, implement and operate information and communication infrastructure (ICT). The portfolio includes cloud, outsourcing, workplace and IoT solutions, as well as mobile communications solutions for mobile working and communication, network solutions, office networking, business process optimisation, SAP solutions, security and authentication solutions and services tailored to banks. The Swisscom Digital Business unit focuses on digital services for SMEs through localsearch, activities in the fintech area and blockchain-based services. Swisscom Wholesale provides other Swiss telecommunications providers with commercial voice, data and broadband products.

==== IT, network & infrastructure ====
The core tasks of Swisscom IT, Network & Infrastructure include the construction, operation and maintenance of Swisscom's comprehensive fixed-network and mobile communications infrastructure. This division includes the corresponding IT platforms.

=== Fastweb S.p.A. ===
Fastweb S.p.A. operates the second largest network in Italy and offers voice, data, internet and IP TV services to private and business customers. In the first half of 2007, Swisscom acquired a majority stake in the Italian Fastweb. The cost of acquiring the stake amounted to around five billion Swiss francs.

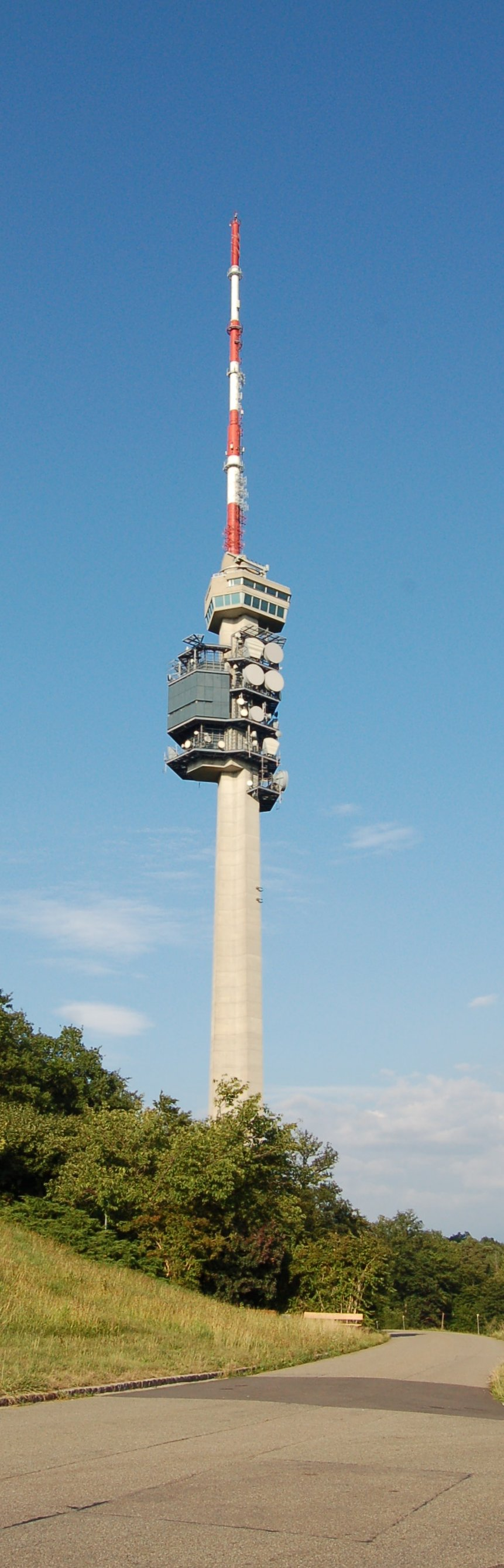
Telecommunication Tower in St. Chrischona is the most important in north-west of Switzerland.

. In 2025, Fastweb agreed to acquire the operations of Vodafone Italy, including a license to use the Vodafone brand for another five years, but with the intention of phasing it out.

=== Other business areas ===
Other business areas include business segments that do not belong directly to, but are related to, the core businesses of telecommunications and IT.

== Brands ==
In Switzerland, Swisscom offers products and services from its core business under the main Swisscom brand. Swisscom also sells lower-cost products and services under the Wingo flanker brand as well as third-party MVNOs such as Coop Mobile, M-Budget Mobile (in cooperation with Coop and Migros respectively) and Lycamobile. Other brands, such as cablex and localsearch, are in Swisscom's portfolio and characterise the company's other areas of business. Abroad, Swisscom's presence is primarily in Italy through the Fastweb brand.

== Business figures ==
The Group's financials for 2022 are as follows:

Category	Value 2022
Group revenue	CHF 11,112 million
EBITDA	CHF 4,406 million
Net income	CHF 1,603 million
Capital expenditure	CHF 2,2309 million
Employees	19,157
Dividend per share	CHF 22.00

Number of customers and market share

Operational data at end of year in thousands	2012	2014	2016	2018	2020	2021	2022
Fixed telephony access lines in Switzerland	3,013	2,778	2,367	1,778	1,523	1,424	1,322
Broadband access lines retail in Switzerland	1,727	1,890	1,992	2,033	2,043	2,037	2,027
TV access lines in Switzerland	791	1,165	1,476	1,519	1,554	1,592	1,571
Mobile access lines	6,217	6,540	6,612	6,551	6,224	6,177	6,173
Broadband access lines in Italy	1,767	2,072	2,355	2,547	2,747	2,750	3,087

== Governance ==
=== Board of directors ===
As of 31 December 2021, the Board of Directors comprised the following non-executive members:

Name	Function	Taking office at the AGM
Michael Rechtsteiner	Chairman	2019
Roland Abt	Member	2016
Alain Carrupt	Member, employee representative	2016
Guus Dekkers	Member	2021
Frank Esser	Deputy Chairman	2014
Barbara Frei	Member	2012
Sandra Lathion-Zweifel	Member, employee representative	2019
Anna Mossberg	Member	2018
Renzo Simoni	Member, representative of the Confederation	2017

=== Group executive board ===
The following table shows the composition of the Group Executive Board as at 1 Novembre 2023.

Name	Function	Appointed to the Group Executive Board as of
Christoph Aeschlimann	CEO Swisscom Ltd	June 2022
Urs Lehner	Head of Business Customers	June 2017
Klementina Pejic	CPO Swisscom Ltd	February 2021
Gerd Niehage	Head of IT, Network & Infrastructure	March 2023
Dirk Wierzbitzki	Head of Residential Customers	June 2017
Eugen Stermetz	CFO Swisscom Ltd	March 2021
Stefan Nünlist	Head of Corporate Communications & Responsibility	April 2023
Martin Vögeli	Head of Group Security & Corporate Affairs	April 2023
Isa Müller-Wegner	Head of Group Strategy & Business Development	June 2023

== Locations ==
Swisscom is headquartered in Worblaufen. In addition, Swisscom owns 90 other office buildings in which around 18,000 Swisscom employees and partners throughout Switzerland work. Swisscom also operates 120 shops across Switzerland.

== Innovation ==
=== Swisscom StartUp Challenge ===
The Swisscom StartUp Challenge provides selected tech startups the opportunity to join a week-long business acceleration program in Silicon Valley. The Challenge is organized in collaboration with VentureLab.

=== Swisscom Ventures ===
Through its venture capital arm, Swisscom promotes start-ups developing solutions in the field of information, communication and entertainment technology.

== Competition ==
In the Swiss Telecommunication market, the main competitors are Sunrise and Salt. In Italy, Swisscom's main competitors are (TIM) and Wind Tre.

=== Connect network test ===
In 2021, Swisscom was rated the Swiss mobile communications provider with the best network by the trade journal "Connect", closely followed by Sunrise. In 2023, Swisscom was again rated the Swiss mobile communications provider with the best network by the trade journal "Connect". In 2025, Swisscom was again rated the Swiss mobile communications provider with the best network by the trade journal "Connect".

== Criticism ==
In a survey in 2016, conducted by the Swiss newspaper Tages-Anzeiger, some consumers criticized Swisscom's international roaming rates and its subscription rates for mobile phones. The main concern of the consumers in the survey was that they found the rates to be too high.
