= List of Swiss companies by revenue =

Switzerland has a large economy and highly skilled labor force.

Eleven (11) Swiss companies are included on Fortune's "Global 500" list (in 2024).

The largest bank was UBS and the largest insurance company was Zurich Insurance Group.

== Largest companies ==
Ranked by revenue 2017.

Rank	Name	Headquarters	Revenue (Million CHF)	Employees	Industry	Director
1.	Glencore	Baar	217 597	158 000	commodity trading	Gary Nagle
2.	Vitol	Geneva	178 213	5 441	commodity trading	Russell Hardy
5.	Mercuria Energy Trading	Geneva	102 398	1 000	commodity trading	Marco Dunand
6.	Nestlé	Vevey	89 791	308 000	agriculture/food	Pablo Isla
7.	Roche	Basel	63 299	68 218	chemical/pharmaceutical	Severin Schwan
8.	Gunvor	Geneva	62 030	1 600	commodity trading	
9.	Novartis	Basel	48 353	90 924	chemical/pharmaceutical	Vasant Narasimhan
10.	BHP	Baar	37 695		commodity trading	
11.	ABB	Zurich	29 169	140 000	engineering	
12.	Coop	Basel	29 207	37 370	retail/services	
13.	Migros	Zurich	28 071	59 934	retail/services	
14.	Holcim	Jona	26 129	59 901	construction materials	
15.	Mediterranean Shipping Company	Geneva	26 000	28 000	logistics/shipping	
16.	Adecco	Opfikon	23 660	33 000	temp workers	
17.	Kühne + Nagel	Schindellegi	22 220	25 607	international transport/logistics	
18.	Ineos	Rolle	16 900	17 000	chemicals	
19.	Tetra Pak	Pully	12 778	24 800	food packaging	
20.	Syngenta	Basel	12 649	19 337	chemical/pharmaceutical	
21.	Intersport	Bern	12 500		retail	
22.	Richemont	Geneva	12 199		luxury goods	
23.	Swisscom	Bern	11 662	16 088	telecommunications	
24.	DKSH Management AG	Zurich	11 006	20 500	import/export	
25.	Liebherr	Bulle	10 939	23 762	engineering	
26.	Schindler	Ebikon	10 179	40 385	engineering	
27.	Swiss Federal Railways	Bern	9 442	28 383	public transport/railroads	
28.	Transgourmet Holding	Basel	9 087		retail	
29.	ALSO Holding	Emmen	8 891		IT distribution	
30.	MET Group	Zug	8 433		commodity trading	
31.	Dufry	Basel	8 377		retail	
32.	Swatch	Bienne	7 960	20 650	watchmaking	
33.	Swiss Post	Bern	7 930	41 073	service	
34.	DXT Commodities	Lugano	7 670		commodity trading	
35.	Alpiq	Lausanne	7 163	8 500	electric utility	
36.	CEVA Logistics	Baar	6 886		logistics	
37.	Barry Callebaut	Zurich	6 805	8 542	chocolate	
38.	Clariant	Muttenz	6 377	23 383	chemical/pharmaceutical	
39.	SGS	Geneva	6 349	41 460	service	
40.	Fenaco	Bern	6 262	7 244	retail	
41.	Sika	Baar	6 248	10 852	construction materials	
42.	Manor	Geneva	6 000	11 500	retail	
43.	Ameropa Holding	Binningen	5 580		agriculture	
44.	Axpo	Baden	5 567	2 990	energy production/distribution	
45.	Pargesa Holding	Geneva	5 540			
46.	Panalpina	Basel	5 533	13 583	international shipping/logistics	
47.	Hilti	Schaan	5 133	16 062	power tools	
48.	Lonza	Basel	5 105	5 984	chemical/pharmaceutical	
49.	Givaudan	Vernier	5 051	5 924	chemical/pharmaceutical	
50.	Swiss Air Lines	Basel	4 954	6 094	air transport	
51.	Rolex	Geneva	4 900	5 800	watchmaking	
52.	AMAG	Zurich	4 600	3 946	automobile sales/imports	
53.	Gategourmet	Kloten	4 554		catering	
54.	TAG Heuer	La Chaux-de-Fonds	4 228		watchmaking	
55.	Georg Fischer	Schaffhausen	4 150	12 403	engineering	
56.	Lindt & Sprüngli	Kilchberg	4 106	6 713	food products	
57.	Axpo Trading	Baden	4 047		energy production/distribution	
58.	Omya	Oftringen	4 000	6 500	chemicals	
59.	Kolmar	Zug	3 988		commodity trading	
60.	Implenia	Dietlikon	3 859		construction	
61.	Rehau	Muri bei Bern	3 850	14 800	synthetic materials	
62.	Aryzta	Zurich	3 797		food	
63.	Bell	Basel	3 537	3 326	meat products	
64.	Emmi	Lucerne	3 364	2 765	food products	
65.	Firmenich	Geneva	3 340		chemical/pharmaceutical	
66.	Apple Suisse	Zurich	3 300		electronics	
67.	Galenica	Bern	3 214	2 460	wholesale (pharmacy)	
68.	Schmolz + Bickenbach	Lucerne	3 133		steel	
69.	Swissport	Opfikon	3 100	21 000	service	
70.	Denner	Zurich	3 050	3 577	retail	
71.	Sulzer	Winterthur	3 049	9 656	engineering	
72.	Transocean	Vernier	2 927		oil and gas	
73.	Geberit	Rapperswil	2 908	5 162		
74.	Artemis	Hergiswil	2 879		conglomerate	
75.	OC Oerlikon	Pfäffikon	2 847		engineering	
76.	Bühler	Uzwil	2 693	6 266	engineering	
77.	Bucher	Niederweningen	2 647		engineering	
78.	BMW Suisse	Dielsdorf	2 610	403	automobile sales/imports	
79.	Omega SA	Bienne	2 600	2 000	watchmaking	
80.	Actelion	Allschwil	2 600	2 500	pharmaceuticals/biotech	
81.	BKW Energie	Bern	2 577		electricity	
82.	Logitech	Apples	2 532		software	
83.	dormakaba	Rümlang	2 520		security technology	
84.	Endress+Hauser	Reinach, Basel-Land	2 502			
85.	Werco Trade	Zug	2 450		commodity trading	
86.	Manor Holding SA	Basel	2 430		retail	
87.	Sonova	Stäfa	2 396		medical devices	
88.	CRH Gétaz Group	Saint-Légier-La Chiésaz	2 300		construction parts	
89.	Ferring Pharmaceuticals	Saint-Prex	2 300	6 500	chemical/pharmaceutical	
90.	Coop Mineraloel	Allschwil	2 279		oil and gas	
91.	Autoneum	Winterthur	2 203		automotive	
92.	Hewlett-Packard Suisse	Dübendorf	2 200	1 400	computers	
93.	Mercedes-Benz Suisse	Zug	2 200		automobile sales/imports	
94.	Stadler Rail	Bussnang	2 200	8 500	train manufacturing	
95.	MIR Trade	Herisau	2 200		retail	
96.	Siemens Suisse	Zurich	2 156		electronics	
97.	Ems-Chemie	Domat/Ems	2 146		chemicals	
98.	Vorwerk International Strecker & Co.	Freienbach	2 125		retail	
99.	MSC Cruises	Geneva	2 100	23 500	transportation/shipping	
100.	Aldi Suisse	Beromünster	2 090		retail	

== Largest banks ==
Ranked by total assets in 2015.

Ranked	Name	Headquarters	Total assets (Mio. CHF)	Income (Mio. CHF)	Employees	Manager
1.	UBS	Zurich	942 819	6 203	60 099	
3.	Raiffeisen	St. Gallen	205 748	808	9 286	
4.	Zürcher Kantonalbank	Zurich	154 410	722	5 179	
5.	PostFinance	Bern	114 468	575	3 654	
6.	Julius Baer Group	Zurich	84 116	123	5 364	
7.	Banque cantonale vaudoise	Lausanne	43 418	336	1 947	
8.	Migros Bank	Zurich	42 232	226	1 334	
9.	Luzerner Kantonalbank	Lucerne	33 272	180	943	
10.	Saint Galler Kantonalbank	St. Gallen	31 189	133	1 065	
11.	CA Indosuez Wealth Management	Geneva	28 453	127	2 632	
12.	Berner Kantonalbank	Bern	28 035	131	1 091	
13.	EFG International	Zurich	26 796	57	2 169	
14.	Valiant Holding AG	Lucerne	25 449	114	821	
15.	Union Bancaire Privée	Geneva	25 215	25	1 450	
16.	HSBC Private Bank (Suisse)	Geneva	24 894	−92	1 213	
17.	Aargauische Kantonalbank	Laufenburg	24 286	155	690	
18.	Neue Aargauer Bank	Aarau	23 823	138	615	
19.	Basler Kantonalbank	Basel	22 593	89	1 061	
20.	BNP Paribas (Suisse)	Geneva	21 114	42	1 446	

== Largest insurance companies ==
Ranked by gross inflow of premiums in 2016.

Rang	Name	Headquarters	Ranked by gross inflow of premiums (Mio. CHF)	Net profit (Mio. CHF)	Employees	Manager
1.	Zurich Financial Services	Zurich	53 482	3 211	54 000	
2.	Swiss Re	Zurich	33 231	3 558	14 053	
3.	Swiss Life	Zurich	17 366	926	7 801	
4.	Helvetia Insurance	St. Gallen	8 403	492	6 481	
5.	Winterthur Group	Winterthur	7 993	300		
6.	Bâloise	Basel	6 711	534	7 270	
7.	Helsana	Dübendorf	6 370	98	3 149	
8.	CSS	Lucerne	5 855	98	2 417	
9.	Groupe Mutuel	Martigny	4 477	−1	2 122	
10.	Suva	Lucerne	4 240	27	4 191	
