= Banque cantonale neuchâteloise =

Coordinates: 46.9899°N 6.9285°E

Banque Cantonale Neuchâteloise

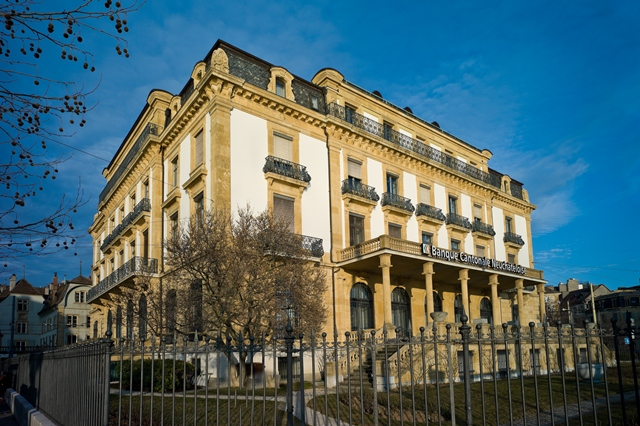
- Industry: financial service activities, except insurance and pension funding
- Founded: 1883
- Services: Banking
- Operating income: 91.267 mln CHF (2023)
- Total assets: 11 879 mln CHF (2023)
- Number of employees: 311 (2023)
- Website: bcn.ch

Banque Cantonale Neuchâteloise is a Swiss cantonal bank which is part of the 24 cantonal banks serving Switzerland's 26 cantons. Founded in 1883, Banque Cantonale Neuchâteloise in 2014 had 12 branches across Switzerland with 264 employees; total assets of the bank were 9 979.04 mln CHF. Headquartered in Neuchâtel (NE), Banque Cantonale Neuchâteloise has full state guarantee of its liabilities.

== History ==
The Grand Council of Neuchâtel has voted on 14 April 1882 a law founding the Banque cantonale neuchâteloise. The first branch of the bank opened on January 2nd 1883 in Neuchâtel, followed the same year by a second branch in La Chaux-de-Fonds. A savings service is created in 1894. Starting from the beginning of the 20th century, the Swiss National Bank received the monopoly to issue banknotes, cutting that way part of the BCN's capital. This led the Grand Council to vote a new law in 1907 to increase the bank's capital and the state's share in that capital.

During the 1920s the BCN saw its capital increased again, while it was absorbing the Caisse d'épargne de Neuchâtel. During the years of crisis between 1920 and 1930, the BCN supported the canton's watchmaking industry in a significant way. At the beginning of the 1930s, the bank, which was suffering from the consequences of the economic crisis, had to be stabilized twice.

After World War II the BCN enjoyed a long period of prosperity. In 1975, the balance sheet of the bank crossed the billion Swiss franc mark for the first time. In 1980, the adoption of a new law by the Grand Counsil allows a new capital increase.

In 1983 the Banque cantonale neuchâteloise creates for its 100th anniversary a cultural foundation to support culture in the canton of Neuchâtel with a capital of two million francs. In 2003, the BCN announces the closing of six of its twenty branches for financial reasons, but also due to security issues and a lack of visitors in those branches. In 2011, the president of the board of directors of the Banque cantonale neuchâteloise is, for the first time, a woman: Manuela Surdez.

Starting from 2014 the Banque cantonale neuchâteloise becomes a pioneer in Switzerland by being one of the first institutions of the country to accept as clients businesses that are active in the blockchain and cryptocurrency sector, a position resulting from the strategy of the canton's economic promotion aiming at supporting that industry. However, the BCN makes a U-turn at the beginning of 2024 by deciding to stop hosting cryptocurrency brokerage activities, a reversal that triggered questions as far as the Great Council.

== Organisation ==
The BCN is a public-law institution, whose CHF 100 million capital is entirely owned by the canton. As precised by the law, the BCN runs its activity in full independence from the state. Its headquarter is in Neuchâtel. It is a member of the 24 cantonal bank network Association of Swiss Cantonal Banks.

On 31 January 2021 the Banque cantonale neuchâteloise had twelve branches spread over the canton's territory (Cernier, Colombier, Couvet, Fleurier, La Chaux-de-Fonds, Le Landeron, Le Locle, Les Brenets, Marin-Epagnier, Neuchâtel, Peseux, Saint-Aubin-Sauges).

The BCN has received the Fair-ON-Pay label, which certifies the respect of the Gender Equality Act.

== See also ==
- Cantonal bank
- List of banks in Switzerland
