= Urner Kantonalbank =

Urner Kantonalbank (URKB)

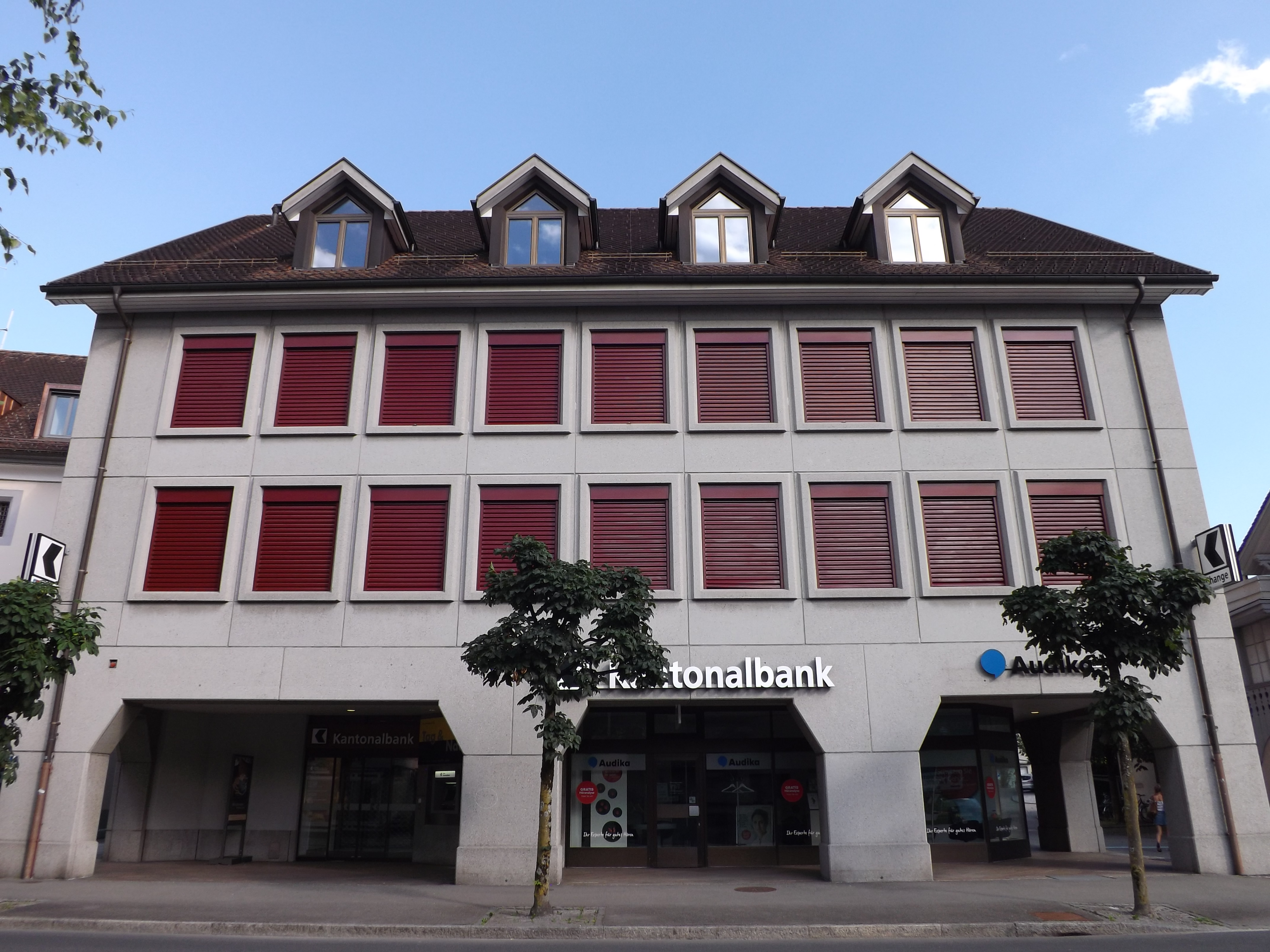
- Industry: Banking; Financial services
- Predecessor: Ersparniskasse Uri
- Founded: 1915
- Headquarters: Bahnhofstrasse 1 Altdorf; 6460 Switzerland
- Number of locations: 11
- Area served: Canton of Uri
- Key people: Heini Sommer (President); Christoph Bugnon (CEO)
- Total assets: 3.05 bln CHF (2016)
- Number of employees: 103 (2016)
- Website: www.ukb.ch

The Urner Kantonalbank is the cantonal bank of the Canton of Uri, having its seat in Altdorf. It was founded in 1915 and is organized as a public-law institution. The bank is the market leader in the Canton of Uri operating ten offices, other than its headquarters. Urner Kantonalbank had 103 employees and total assets of 3.05 billion Swiss francs at the end of 2016.

== History ==
Urner Kantonalbank was established in 1915 as the successor of the Ersparniskasse Uri. In March 2016, the Landrat of Uri elected Heini Sommer as president of the bank's board. In 2016 the bank's assets surpassed the 3-billion threshold for the first time. Christoph Bugnon succeeded Urs Trexel at the beginning of 2017 as the bank's CEO, as the latter decided to step down from the position.

== Services ==
The Urner Kantonalbank offers its services from its headquarters and from its offices in Andermatt, Bürglen, Erstfeld, Flüelen, Göschenen, Isenthal, Schattdorf, Seelisberg, Sisikon, and Wassen.

== See also ==
- Cantonal bank
- List of Banks in Switzerland
