= Appenzeller Kantonalbank =

Coordinates: 47.3295°N 9.4089°E

Appenzeller Kantonalbank (APPKB)
- Industry: Financial services
- Founded: 1899
- Headquarters: Bankgasse 2 Appenzell, 9050 Switzerland
- Area served: Canton of Appenzell Innerrhoden
- Services: Banking
- Total assets: 2 792.81 mln CHF (2014)
- Number of employees: 76 (2014)
- Website: appkb.ch

Appenzeller Kantonalbank is the cantonal bank of the Canton of Appenzell Innerrhoden. Its head office is situated at Appenzell.

80% of the bank's income comes from lending interests.

== Presidents ==
- 2004-2015: Hanspeter Koller
- Since 2015: Roman Boutellier

== See also ==
- List of banks
- List of banks in Switzerland
