= Glarner Kantonalbank =

Swiss bank

- Type: Public-law institution
- Traded as: SIX: GLKBN
- ISIN: CH0189396655
- Industry: Financial services
- Founded: 1884
- Headquarters: Glarus, Switzerland
- Key people: Urs Gnos (chairman); Sven Wiederkehr (CEO)
- Services: Banking
- Total assets: CHF 9.16 billion (2025)
- Number of employees: 330 (2025; 274 full-time equivalents)
- Website: www.glkb.ch

Glarner Kantonalbank is the cantonal bank and the dominant retail banking group in the Swiss canton of Glarus. In 2014, the bank was listed in the SIX Swiss Exchange.

== Branches ==
In addition to the headquarters in Glarus, there are branches in Niederurnen, Näfels, Netstal, Schwanden and Linthal, but not in Glarner Sernftal, which is traditionally served by Glarner Regionalbank AG.

== Ownership ==
On 11 May 2010, Glarner Kantonalbank was transformed from an institution under public law into a public limited company under special law. Until an IPO in July 2014, it was wholly owned by the Canton of Glarus, with a majority stake of 68.24%. In addition to traditional advice in the mortgage and savings business, commercial lending, investment advice and asset management have gained in importance. Like the vast majority of all cantonal banks, the Glarus-based bank also has a so-called state guarantee. This means that the canton is liable for the liabilities of the bank.

== Organisation ==
The board of directors is the supreme supervisory body of the Glarner Kantonalbank. It has seven members. Urs P. Gnos, until then vice-chairman, took over as chairman in February 2024 after the death of Martin Leutenegger. The general meeting re-elected him for a one-year term in April 2026. According to Art. 14 para. 2 of the law on the Cantonal Bank of Glarus, the Government Council (cantonal executive) must be represented on the Board of Directors by at least one member.

== See also ==
- Cantonal bank
- List of Banks in Switzerland
