= Thurgauer Kantonalbank =

Swiss bank

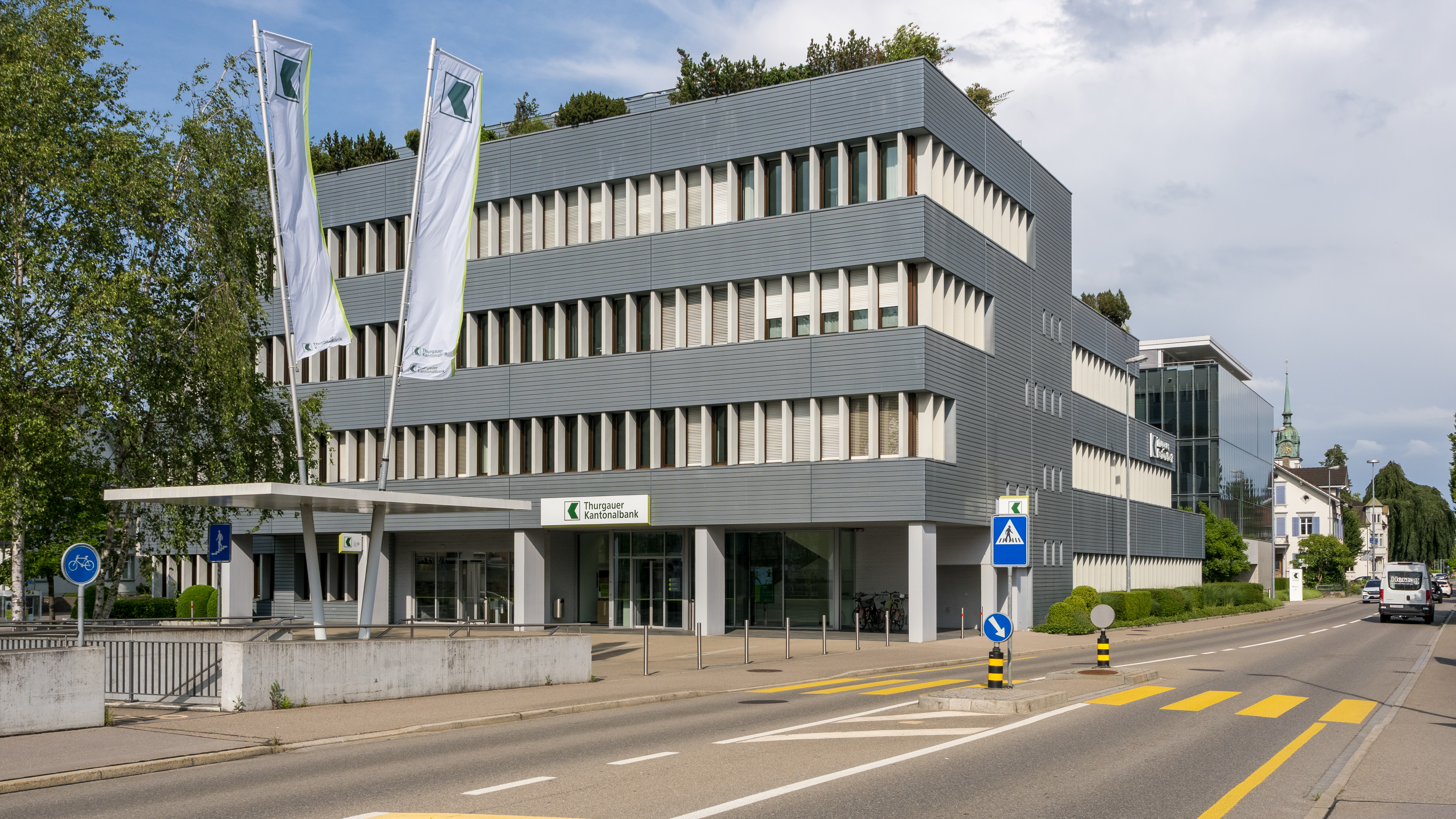
- Company type: Public-law institution
- Traded as: SIX: TKBP
- ISIN: CH0231351104
- Industry: Financial services
- Founded: 1871; 155 years ago
- Headquarters: Weinfelden (TG), Switzerland
- Number of locations: 28 branches (2021)
- Area served: Canton of Thurgau
- Key people: Thomas Koller (Chairman of the Management Board), René Bock (Chairman of the Board)
- Services: Banking services
- Total assets: 28,707.41 mln CHF
- Number of employees: 686 (2022)
- Website: www.tkb.ch

Thurgauer Kantonalbank is a Swiss cantonal bank serving the canton of Thurgau. The head office is based in Weinfelden.

== History ==
Thurgauer Kantonalbank (TKB) was founded in 1871. Thurgauer Kantonalbank is the 22nd largest bank in Switzerland, and 10th largest of the cantonal banks in the country. As of 2020, Thurgauer Kantonalbank recorded an annual profit of £139.08 mln CHF.

In 2014, Thurgauer Kantonalbank went through an IPO and became listed on the Swiss Stock Exchange. The canton provided CHF 50 million of the share capital or 12.5% for this purpose. The offer was oversubscribed several times and generated proceeds of CHF 185 million, all of which went to the canton of Thurgau.

In 2017, the bank sold all of its shares in the Swiss National Bank.

== Products & Services ==
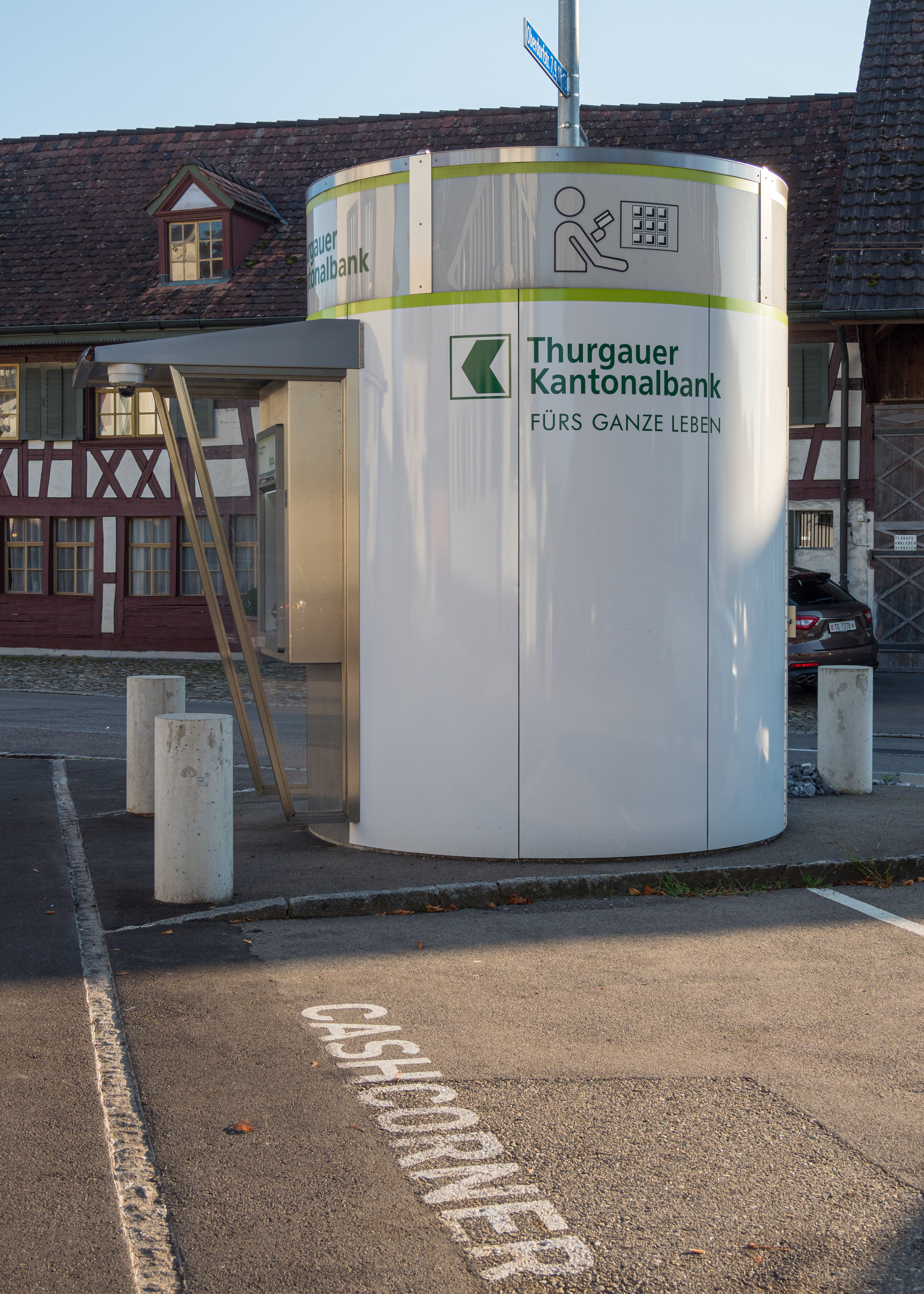
ATM in Wigoltingen

Thurgauer Kantonalbank offer both retail and business services. The bank has 28 locations and 70 ATMs across the canton.

== See also ==
- Cantonal bank
- List of banks
- List of banks in Switzerland
