= Memorial Mario Albisetti =

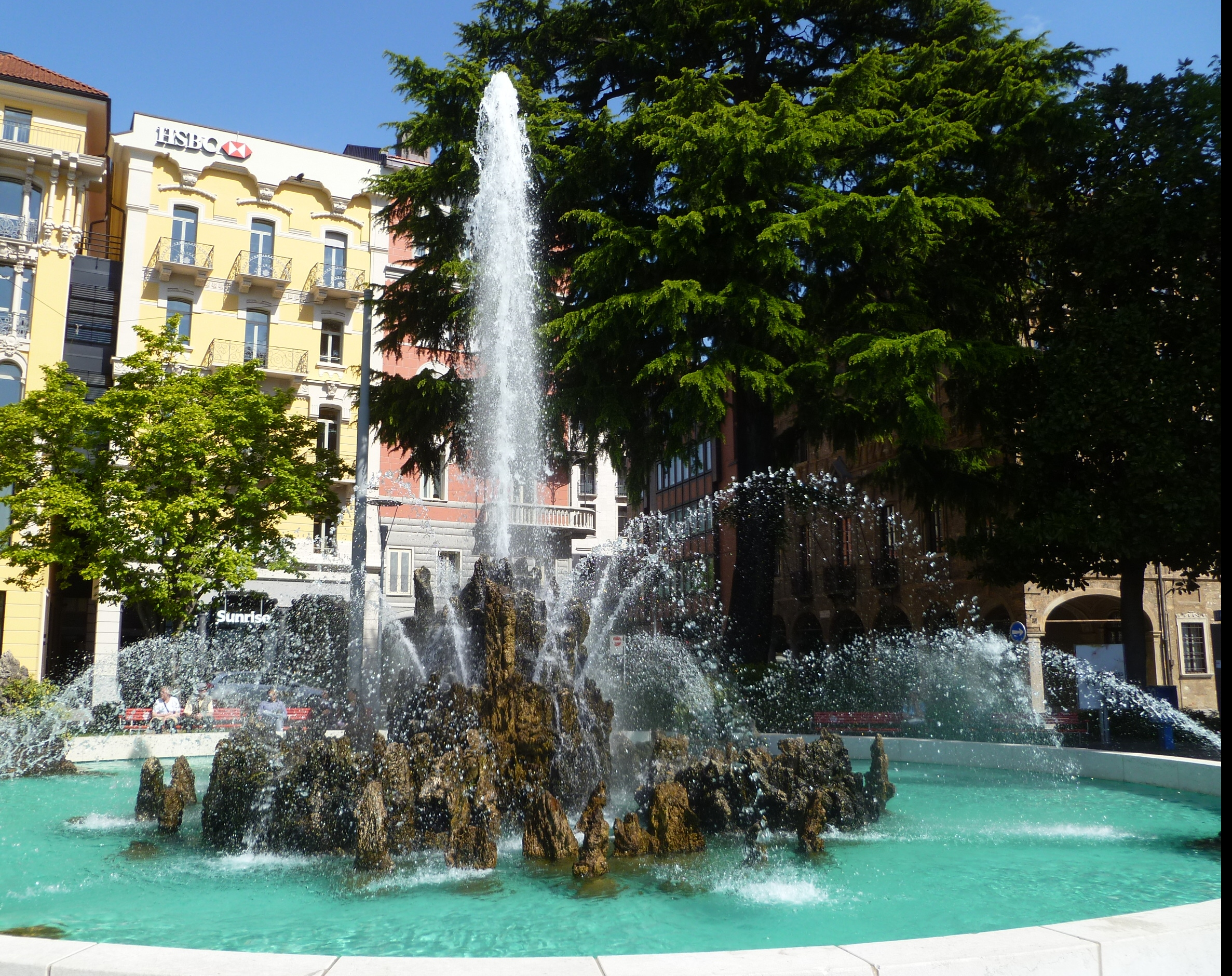
- The fountain near the start and end point of the course in Lugano
- Date: March
- Location: Lugano
- Event type: Road
- Distance: Racewalking
- Primary sponsor: Banca dello Stato del Cantone Ticino
- Established: 2003
- Website: Official website

The Memorial Mario Albisetti, also known as the Lugano Trophy and GP Città di Lugano, is an annual racewalking competition over 20 kilometres that is held in March on the streets of Lugano, Switzerland. It was first held in 2003.

It is one of highest profile annual international racewalking meetings, having both permit status from European Athletics and forming part of the annual IAAF World Race Walking Challenge circuit. It attracts top level racewalkers from across the world. Past winners include Olympic medallists Wang Zhen, Alex Schwazer and world champion Michele Didoni. Schwazer broke Maurizio Damilano's long-standing Italian national record in the 20 km walk en route to his 2010 win.

The course for the race follows the banks of Lake Lugano. It begins and ends at the fountain on Piazza Manzoni – a square near the city's town hall. The straight-looped course of two kilometres is entirely flat. It follows the lakeside roads of Giacondo Albertolli and Vincenzo Vela and has turning points at the end of Vincenzo Vela road and near the Museo Civico di Belle Arti (Civic Museum of Fine Art).

The race director is Daniele Albisetti, a relative of Mario Albisetti. The race is organised by the Societa Atletica Lugano under the patronage of the Lugano City council and Banca dello Stato del Cantone Ticino.

The city of Lugano has a long tradition in racewalking competitions and was host to the first ever IAAF World Race Walking Cup in 1961 and again in 1973.

== Past winners ==
Key: Course record

Edition	Year	Men's winner	Time (h:m:s)	Women's winner	Time (h:m:s)
1st	2003	Roberto Defendenti (ITA)	1:29:55	Natalia Bruniko (ITA)	47:25^{[nb]}
2nd	2004	Roberto Defendenti (ITA)	1:29:28	Marie Polli (SUI)	1:38:44
3rd	2005	Michele Didoni (ITA)	1:28:32	Laura Polli (SUI)	1:39:09
4th	2006	Viktor Ginko (BLR)	1:28:10	Laura Polli (SUI)	1:37:46
5th	2007	Mário dos Santos (BRA)	1:27:40	Elisa Rigaudo (ITA)	1:32:25
6th	2008	Daniele Paris (ITA)	1:24:32	Zuzana Schindlerová (CZE)	1:33:15
7th	2009	Aleksandr Yargunkin (RUS)	1:21:40	Johanna Jackson (GBR)	1:31:16
8th	2010	Alex Schwazer (ITA)	1:18:24	Li Yanfei (CHN)	1:31:27
9th	2011	Wang Zhen (CHN)	1:18:37	Liu Hong (CHN)	1:29:29
10th	2012	Alex Schwazer (ITA)	1:17:30	Tatyana Sibileva (RUS)	1:28:03
11th	2013	Wang Zhen (CHN)	1:19:08	Liu Hong (CHN)	1:27:06
12th	2014	Ruslan Dmytrenko (UKR)	1:20:08	Liu Hong (CHN)	1:27:25
13th	2015	Yohann Diniz (FRA)	1:17:24	Anežka Drahotová (CZE)	1:28:52
—	2016	Did not held			
14th	2017	Alex Wright (IRE)	1:21:19	Brigita Virbalytė-Dimšienė (LTU)	1:32:17
15th	2018	Kouki Ikeda (JPN)	1:21:26	Eleonora Giorgi (ITA)	1:30:31

- ^{nb} The first women's race in 2003 was held over 10 kilometres.

== See also ==
- Lugano Trophy (World Race Walking Cup)
