= Berner Kantonalbank =

Swiss cantonal bank in Bern

Coordinates: 46.9472°N 7.4435°E

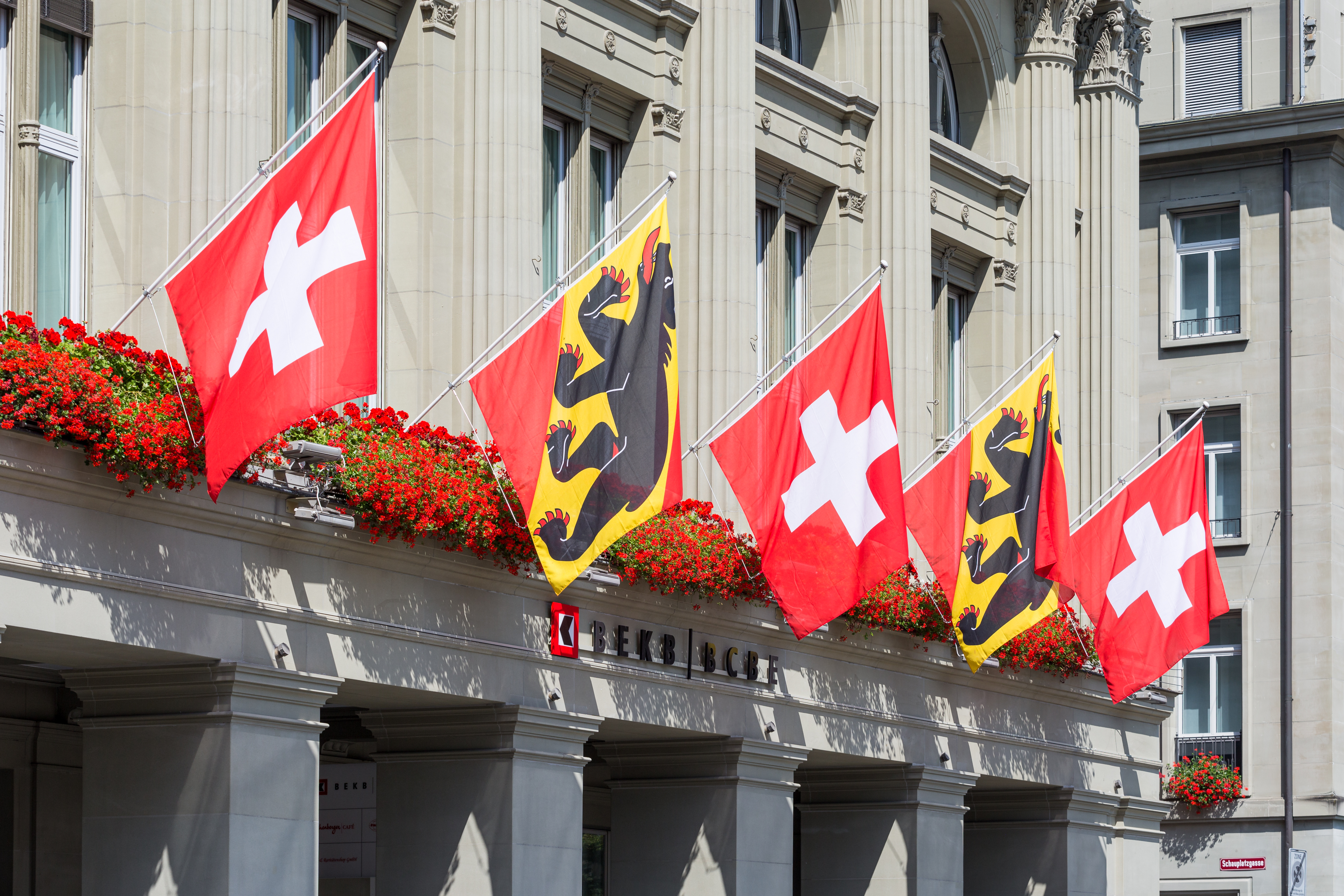
- Type: Public (Aktiengesellschaft/Société Anonyme)
- Traded as: SIX: BEKN
- ISIN: CH0009691908
- Industry: financial sector
- Founded: 1834
- Headquarters: Bern, Switzerland
- Services: Banking
- Number of employees: 1270 (2025)
- Website: bekb.ch

The Berner Kantonalbank AG (BEKB; in French: Banque Cantonale Bernoise SA, BCBE), operating under the brand name "BEKB | BCBE" and based in the Swiss canton of Bern, is a public limited company under private law founded in 1834 as one of the first cantonal banks of its kind, serving Switzerland's 26 cantons. At the end of 2020, the total financial assets of BEKB were valued at 43 billion Swiss francs with their staff comprising approximately 1,270 employees.

As the majority shareholder, the Canton of Bern retains 51.5% of the company's shares, while also guaranteeing their stability, in accordance with the same Canton's constitution. This establishes BEKB as one of the largest cantonal banks in Switzerland. Berner Kantonalbank doesn't have state guarantee of its liabilities.

== History ==
The Cantonal Bank of Bern was founded in 1834 as one of the earliest cantonal banks, following the adoption of a liberal state constitution in the canton of Bern three years prior. This new political arrangement gave citizens the freedom to engage in trade and commerce, leading to the establishment of the Cantonal Bank, which supplied the funds necessary to finance these endeavours. In its early stages, this institution provided services to an extensive demographic and helped encourage economic growth in the region. Over the course of its history, the Cantonal Bank has continued to expand its range of offerings to clients.

It opened its first three branches in 1858 in Saint-Imier, Burgdorf, and Biel/Bienne, and in 1958 the balance of the bank exceeded one billion.

In 1991, the "Cantonal Bank of Bern" and the "Hypothekarkasse des Kantons Bern" merged to form the Berner Kantonalbank. The newly formed institution was mandated to serve as a modern universal bank, fulfil economic and social tasks in the interests of the public and the state, and compete and adapt to new developments in the market with flexibility.

In 1979, four branches of the newly formed cantonal bank Banque cantonale du Jura were transferred and the Berner Kantonalbank had to realign its business and credit policy at the beginning of the 1990s due to the real estate crisis. To separate the recovering bank from the then-founded Dezennium-Finanz AG (DFAG), assets that did not comply with the Berner Kantonalbank’s new business and credit policy were transferred to DFAG in 1993. In order to support the restructuring of their bank, the canton of Bern allocated a total of CHF 1.45 billion over the subsequent years.

Since 1996, the Berner Kantonalbank (BEKB) has operated under the short or brand name of "BEKB | BCBE".

In 1998, BEKB became the first cantonal bank to be converted into a private stock corporation, with a new "Law on the Berner Kantonalbank Stock Corporation" passed to separate the responsibilities of the owner and the management. The canton of Berne's initial majority shareholding was gradually reduced to 51.5 per cent over the subsequent years, with BEKB having paid out around CHF 1.8 billion in dividends and taxes since this time.

In 1999, following the dissolution of the Solothurner Kantonalbank, the BEKB opened its first branch outside the canton of Solothurn. The same year, it became the first cantonal bank organized under private law to have its registered shares listed on the SIX Swiss Exchange in Zurich.

In 2022, the IT subsidiary which had grown from the original DXC was given the designation Aity.

== Services ==
As a financial institution, Berner Kantonalbank offers services including:

- investments & investment advice
- savings
- credit cards
- mortgages
- business financing
- real estate financing
- asset management
- securities trading

It also provides shareholder, youth, educational and SME savings accounts; deposit, current, rental, payment, pension and client funds accounts; investment products; bank cards and credit cards; and pension products.

== Corporate Structure ==
=== CEO ===
Armin Brun is the chief executive officer of the Swiss bank Berner Kantonalbank AG, taking up this role from July 2019. In 2018, he was appointed head of the bank's Retail and Corporate Banking divisions. In 2017, he joined the bank's management board.

=== Board members ===
Antoinette Hunziker-Ebneter: independent president of the board of directors

Christoph Lengwiler: independent vice president of the board

Gilles Frôté: independent director

Annelis Lüscher Hammerli: independent director

pascal sieber: independent director

Danielle Villiger: director

Reto Heiz: director

Hugo Schürmann: director

Petra Kalt: director

=== Management ===
Armin Brun, CEO

Beatrice Kern: member of management board

Stefan Moser: member of management board

Marcel Oertle: member of management board

Domenico Sottile: member of management board

Markus Schwab: member of management board

== See also ==
- Cantonal bank
- List of banks in Switzerland
