= Banque cantonale de Fribourg =

Coordinates: 46.8020°N 7.1512°E

Banque Cantonale de Fribourg

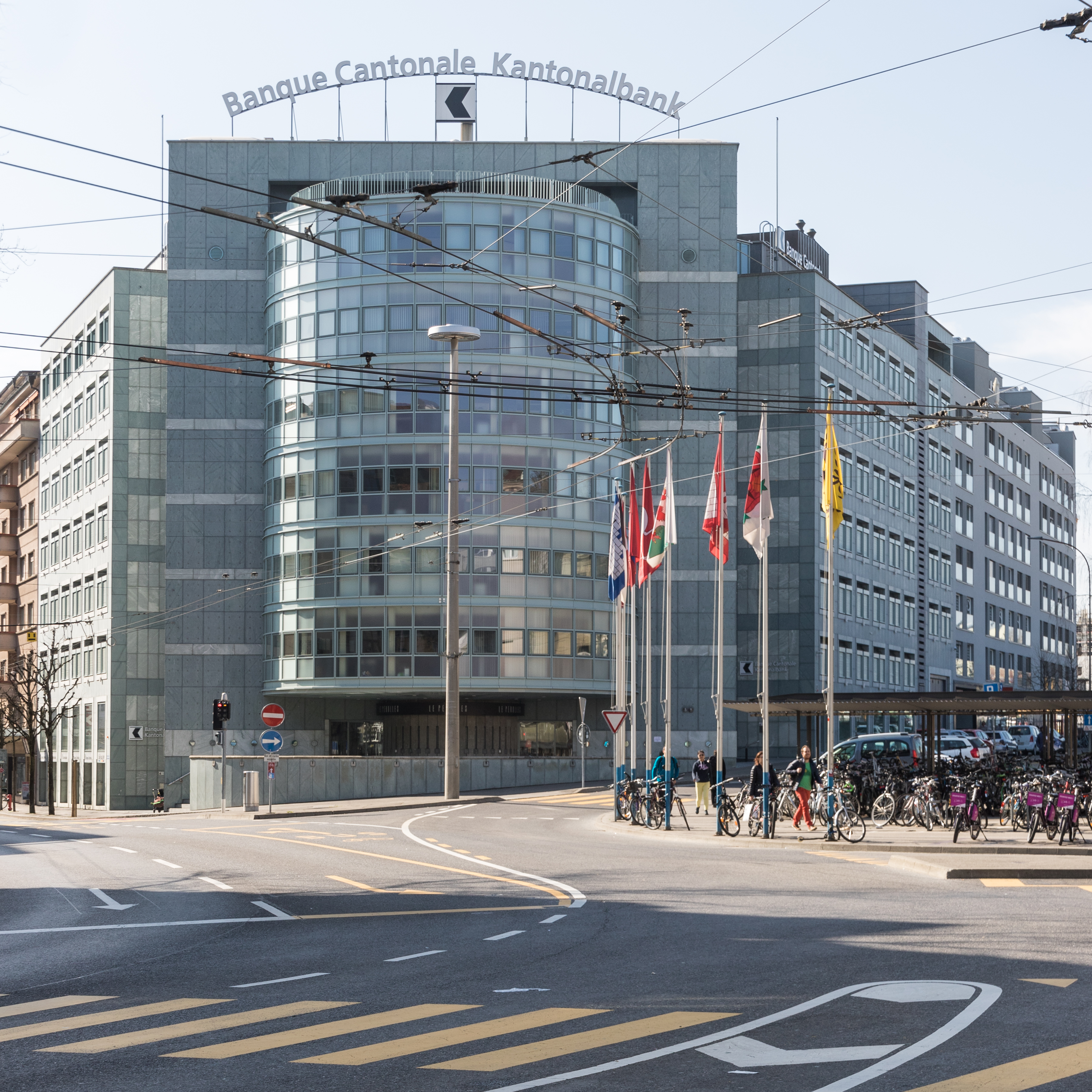
- Company type: Public-law institution
- Industry: financial service activities, except insurance and pension funding
- Founded: 1892
- Services: Banking
- Total assets: 18 938.23 mln CHF (2014)
- Number of employees: 372 (2014)
- Website: bcf.ch

Banque Cantonale de Fribourg (BCF) is a Swiss cantonal bank which is part of the 24 cantonal banks serving Switzerland's 26 cantons. Founded in 1892, Banque Cantonale de Fribourg in 2014 had 29 branches across Switzerland with 372 employees; total assets of the bank were 18 938.23 mln CHF. Headquartered in Fribourg, Banque Cantonale de Fribourg has full state guarantee of its liabilities.

== History ==
Up until 1996, the bank was called Banque de l'État de Fribourg.

Albert Michel was the CEO of BCF from 1993 to 2011, and chairman of the board from 2012 to 2022. Alex Geissbühler has presided the bank since 2022.

== See also ==
- Cantonal bank
- List of banks in Switzerland
