= Banque Cantonale de Genève =

Swiss cantonal bank in Geneva

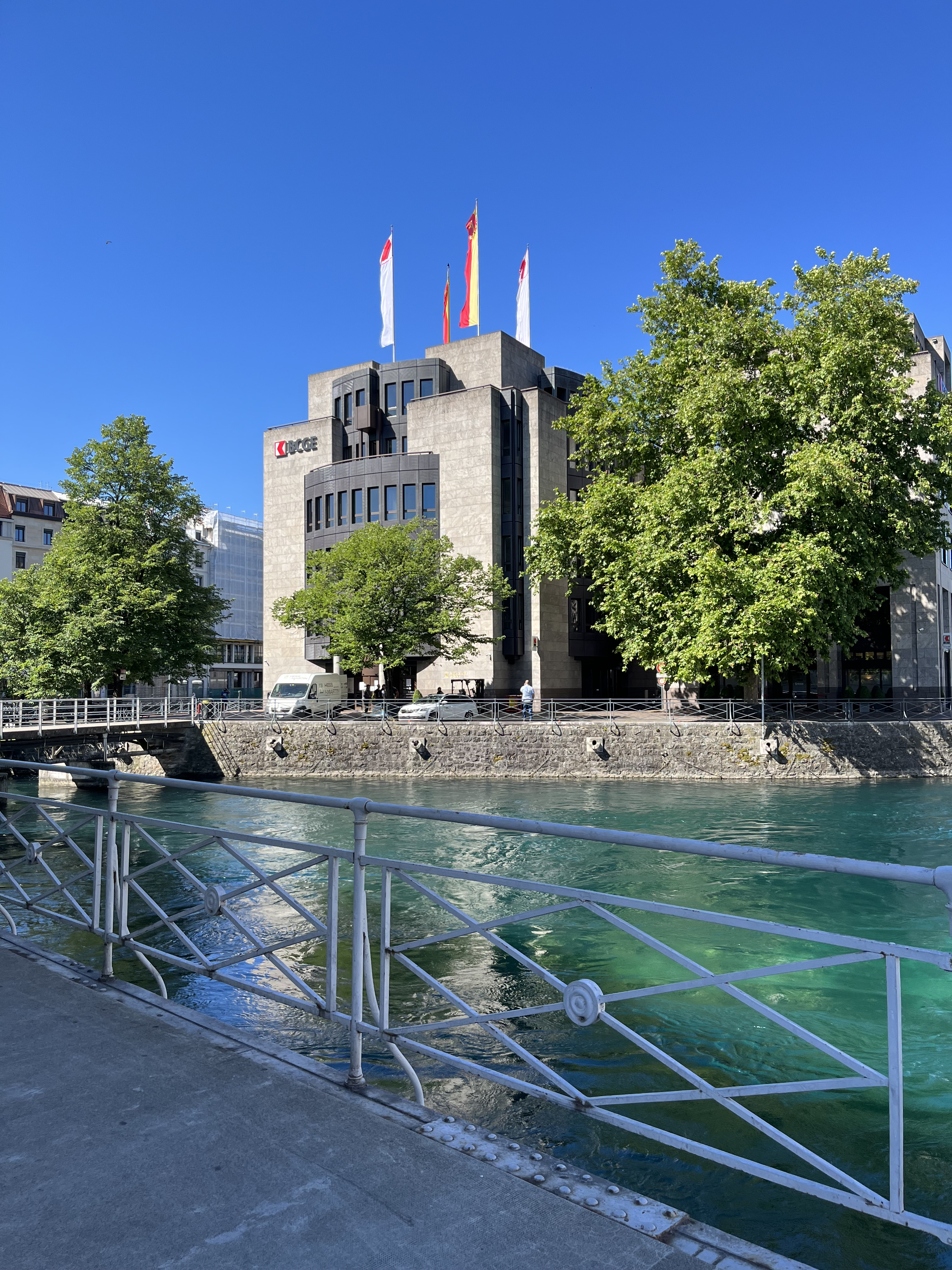
- Type: Public company
- Traded as: SIX: BCGE
- ISIN: CH0350494719
- Industry: Banking
- Predecessor: Caisse d’épargne de la République et Canton de Genève (1816); Banque Hypothécaire du Canton de Genève (1847)
- Founded: January 1, 1994
- Headquarters: Geneva, Switzerland,
- Key people: Nicolas Krügel (chief executive officer); Manuel Leuthold (chairman of the board)
- Revenue: CHF 476 million (2022)
- Net income: CHF 176 million (2022)
- Total assets: CHF 30 billion (2022)
- Total equity: CHF 2 billion (2022)
- Owner: 72.6%: Geneva public authorities
- Number of employees: 874 (2022)
- Website: www.bcge.ch

Banque Cantonale de Genève (BCGE) is a limited company established under Swiss public law, resulting from the merger of the Caisse d'Épargne de la République et Canton de Genève (founded in 1816) and the Banque Hypothécaire du Canton de Genève (founded in 1847). It is one of the 24 cantonal banks.

72.6% of the bank's capital is held by the Geneva public authorities (the State of Geneva holds 44.3%, the city of Geneva holds 20.9%, while the Geneva municipalities hold 7.4%). The rest of the capital (27.4%) is traded on the SIX Swiss Exchange, where the bank is listed.

BCGE group operates as a universal bank: its client base is made up of both individuals and companies. The activities of the Group include day-to-day banking services, mortgage loans, financing of companies and public authorities, asset management, pension services, private banking and commodity trade finance.

In addition to its 21 branches in the Canton of Geneva, the group is also present in Lausanne, Zurich, and Basel in Switzerland as well as in France (Lyon, Annecy, Paris), and it maintains two representative offices in Dubai and Hong Kong.

== History ==
=== Origins ===
The Banque Cantonale de Genève is the result of a merger of two institutions, the "Caisse d'Épargne de la République et Canton de Genève" and the "Banque Hypothécaire du Canton de Genève", both established during the 19th century, making it the oldest cantonal bank.

In 1816, the State of Geneva created the Caisse d'Épargne de Genève upon the proposal of Jean Auguste Pyrame de Candolle and Richard Tronchin; Tronchin participating in the foundation of the establishment by providing the guarantee capital. The bank replaced the previous Caisse d'Épargne et de Dépôt established in the city in 1789. The goal of the new bank is to finance the activity of small and medium-sized enterprises in the Geneva region while encouraging the population, especially the working class, to accumulate savings. By statute, the bank is a foundation governed by public law. When it was founded in 1816, its offices were located at Geneva City Hall. The bank then took up occupancy at 113 rue des Chanoines (now 10 rue Calvin). As of 1839, it moved to 12 rue de la Corraterie. To foster further development, the establishment built a new building located at the intersection of Boulevard du Théâtre and Rue Petitot in 1879, then a second building in 1913, located at 4 rue de la Corraterie. The number of depositors increased from 12,935 in 1859 to 89,828 in 1910 and by 1913, the majority of Genevans had a bankbook at the Caisse d'Épargne. In 1968, customer deposits reached 750 million francs. In 1987, the Caisse d'Épargne became the CEG-Caisse d'Épargne, then changed its name again three years later to become CEG Genève. CEG Genève opened its first branch in France in 1993, with the head office in Lyon and a branch in Annecy. In 1993, the bank employed 530 employees throughout the canton of Geneva.

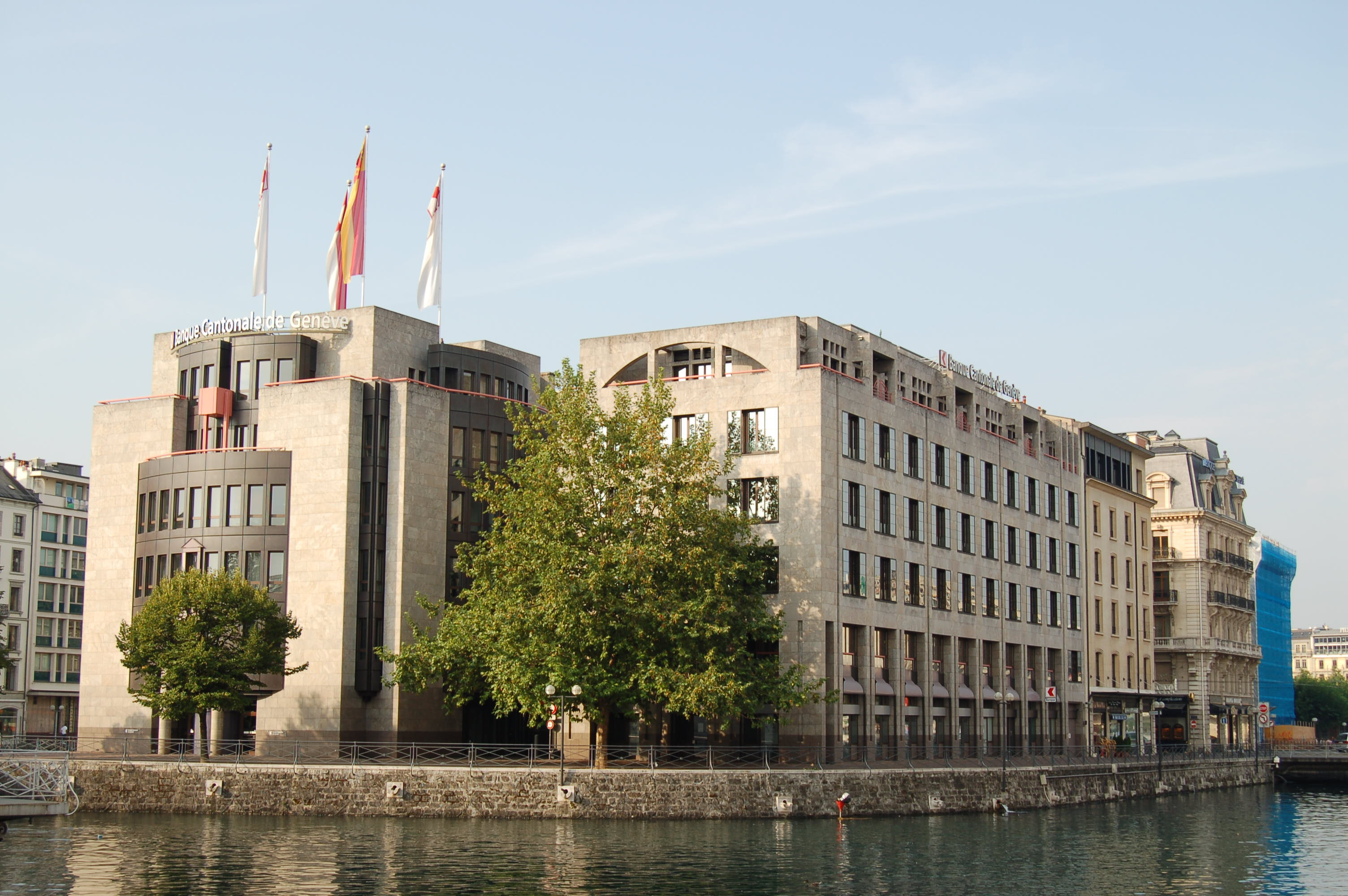
The current head office of BGE at Quai de l'Île was inaugurated in 1991 by the Banque Hypothécaire du Canton de Genève. The site was the location of numerous mills until the mid-19th century.

The Caisse hypothécaire was founded in 1847 by James Fazy. The bank initially catered to a client base made up primarily of farmers. From a statutory perspective, the bank is a corporation under public law: the municipalities own the capital but the institution does not possess a government-backed guarantee. Its offices were initially located on Rue de la Pelisserie. Two years later in 1849, the bank moved to Place du Molard. In 1976, the institution changed its name to "Banque Hypothécaire du Canton de Genève", abbreviated BHCG or simply BCG. Starting in 1987, the institution opened its capital to the general public through the issue of bearer shares, although the majority of the capital remained with the Geneva municipalities through registered shares. In the period from 1987 to 1990, the bank built a new head office located at Quai de l'Île 17, inaugurated in 1991. In 1994, the building became the headquarters of the new Banque Cantonale de Genève.

A merger of the two institutions was considered several times during the 20th century. Several unsuccessful projects were launched by Socialist MPs: Jules Roux in the course of the 1930s, then Alex Burtin in the 1960s. The project came to fruition in the early 1990s in the context of increased competition and crisis in the Swiss real estate market, which generated significant losses for local banking institutions inciting them to pool their costs. In 1992, the Grand Council of Geneva passed a resolution of principle in favour of a merger of the two establishments; the citizens of the city later approved the project in 1993 after a vote. The Banque Cantonale de Genève was founded on 1 January 1994. Two-thirds of the new institution originated from CEG Genève and one-third from Banque Hypothécaire du Canton de Genève.

=== Restructuring ===
At the end of the 1990s, the bank experienced financial difficulties, in particular because of a high proportion of loans not repaid by customers. 68% of these loans were from the former CEG Genève, 29% from the former Banque Hypothécaire, and 3% from new loans issued by the BCGE since its establishment. In 2000, the institution had to be bailed out and was recapitalised by the Canton of Geneva, with the help of an ad hoc foundation (the "Fondation de valorisation") which assumed over five billion francs in loans. Dominique Ducret, President, and Marc Fues, chief executive officer, resigned from their posts.

At the same time, the bank was the subject of accusations relating to its management. In October 1999, Bernard Monnot, former director of the bank's Lyon branch, stated that 573 million French francs deposited with the bank between 1996 and 1998 had been processed by the institution in the context of money laundering. Five shareholders filed a complaint against the bank in 2000 following these statements. The investigation became widely publicised because Socialist MP Arnaud Montebourg, spokesperson of the French parliamentary mission dedicated to this case, accused Jean-Claude Trichet, governor of the Bank of France, of complicity by refusing to denounce the alleged actions of the bank. BCGE and the Banque de France denied the accusations made against them. The proceedings were dismissed: in the absence of evidence, the Prosecutor General of Geneva, Bernard Bertossa, judged the complaint as unfounded and closed the case without further action on 14 November 2001.

However, in March 2001, the State of Geneva and BCGE brought civil actions against the former management of the bank, accusing them of having voluntarily drawn up fraudulent documents on the financial situation of the institution. For the same reason, in February 2003, the State of Geneva launched a civil action against the audit firm Ernst & Young which had validated the accounts. The investigation lasted several years, resulting in 280 hearings and 3,700 pages of minutes by 2007. An investigation was opened in 2009 and Dominique Ducret, former president of the bank, Marc Fues, former director, René Curti his deputy, as well as two auditors from Ernst & Young were tried. They were accused of forgery and criminal mismanagement for an alleged damage of 2.3 billion francs. According to the indictment, the accused having discovered that in 1996 the financial and accounting situation of BCGE was in danger, partly because of debtors at risk, concealed the information from the Board of directors by publishing falsified annual results from 1996 to 1998. Instead of setting up provisions, the bank paid out dividends to shareholders, granted bonuses to managers and failed to alert the Swiss Federal Banking Commission. According to Attorney General Daniel Zappelli, the three BCGE officials hid the catastrophic situation of the establishment to keep their positions, salaries and bonuses. The verdict was rendered on 22 July 2011 by the Criminal Court: Marc Fues and René Curti were found guilty of forgery and acquitted of the other charges. The Federal Supreme Court essentially upheld this decision. Dominique Ducret was acquitted of all the charges for which he was prosecuted and received financial compensation.

In 2017, the Ensemble à Gauche party drew up a regularization bill (PL 12238) aimed at the Banque Cantonale de Genève, which was to reimburse the sums associated with its bail-out in 2000, i.e. 3.2 billion francs. The project launched a significant debate between defenders and critics. In 2018, Ensemble à Gauche organised a constitutional initiative to pass this bill. However, the project was rejected by the Council of State and the Constitutional Chamber of the Geneva Court of Justice. This decision was confirmed by the Federal Supreme Court in 2020, on the grounds that this would result in the bank being placed in a situation of over-indebtedness and would then be forced into bankruptcy.

=== Development ===
In the years following the bail-out, the establishment returned to profitability. In 2013, the bank's executives participated in the U.S. tax regularisation programme, aimed at helping the U.S. Department of Justice investigate tax and bank fraud. The institution was placed in category 2, designating banks not incriminated by the US Department of Justice, but which have American customers who could have violated US tax law.

In 2016, BCGE celebrated its bicentenary by organising one event per month throughout the year, with special focus on Geneva's culture and economic history. For one of the events, BCGE is partnered with Handicap International to renovate the Broken Chair at the Place des Nations in the north of the city.

In 2017, the institution modernised its capital structure: the three classes of shares offered by the bank (bearer, registered A and B shares) were replaced by a single class of registered shares. In February 2017, the bank capital consisted of 7.2 million registered shares with a face value of 50 francs. This amendment has no impact on the public authorities that are shareholders of the bank, but makes it possible to increase the transparency of individual shareholding and simplifies the exchange of the public float on the stock exchange.

== Legal form and governance ==
The Banque Cantonale de Genève is a limited company subject to Swiss banking legislation. 72.6% of the capital is held by the Geneva public authorities: the State of Geneva holds 44.3%, the city of Geneva holds 20.9%, while the Geneva municipalities hold 7.4%. It has the status of a cantonal bank within the meaning of Article 3a of the Swiss Federal Act on Banks and Savings Banks of 8 November 1934. As such, it is a member of the Association of Swiss Cantonal Banks, a network of 24 cantonal banks present in Switzerland. As of 1 January 2017, its liabilities are no longer guaranteed by the State of Geneva.

Since 2005, the bank has been administered by an 11-member board of directors. The composition is determined by law.

In terms of corporate social responsibility (CSR), BCGE received the prize for gender diversity within its board of directors from "Cercle suisse des administratrices" (Swiss Circle of Women Directors) in 2017. In the same spirit, the bank carries out a salary review every two years to ensure equal pay for men and women.

== Activities ==
=== Structure ===
The bank's mission is to "contribute to the development of Geneva and its region". At the same time, due to the diversification of its activities it addresses an international client base and carries out various activities by operating as a universal bank.

From an organisational perspective, the company has divided its activities into eight divisions: General Management, Finance, Operations, Geneva, Corporate, International, Asset Management and Legal and compliance. The processing of transactions on the financial markets is organised from the bank dealing room.

=== Activities ===
The main activity of the institution is day-to-day banking (management of deposits and granting of credits) aimed at a client base made up of individuals and companies. At the end of 2021, deposits of the bank's customers totalled CHF 18 billion, while outstanding mortgage loans amounted to CHF 12 billion. In 2021, the credit business generated CHF 227 million in revenue, or about half of the bank's annual sales (CHF 439 million).

The institution's second activity is asset management with CHF 34 billion of assets under management at the end of 2021. This activity covers the investment of client assets as well as the management of pension provision and generated revenues of CHF 136 million (in the form of management fees) in 2021. In particular, Banque Cantonale de Genève manages a range of investment funds called "Synchrony", composed of funds mainly invested in the financial markets (shares, bonds) or in real estate. The bank also offers its clients management mandates as part of its private banking activity as well as investments in the form of private equity. Finally, in terms of pension provision, the institution manages the assets of its customers through two entities, the "Fondation libre passage" (vested benefits foundation) and the "Fondation épargne 3" (employee benefits institution).

In addition to these activities, BCGE offers its individual clients wealth advisory services, in particular through its private banking activity.

Among the services dedicated to companies and entrepreneurs, in addition to financing and credit operations, the bank offers consulting services in financial engineering, the acquisition and transfer of ownership of a company as well as solutions in the financing of professional real estate, in particular in France. The institution also has a trade finance unit dedicated to the financing of commodity trading ("global commodity finance" division).

== Locations and subsidiaries ==
=== Branches ===
The bank's head office is located in Geneva and its network consists of 21 branches in the canton of Geneva. In Switzerland, the company also has three branches in Lausanne (since 1997), Zurich (since 1997) and Basel (since 2019).

In France, the bank operates through its subsidiary "Banque Cantonale de Genève (France) SA" located in Lyon since 1993. The company also has branches in Annecy and Paris, the latter having been opened in 2010.

Outside Switzerland and France, the bank has two representative offices in Dubai (since 2010) and Hong Kong (since 2010 also). In Hong Kong, BCGE is an exception in the Swiss banking landscape by offering the opening of checking accounts in renminbi since 2015.

=== Subsidiaries ===
In parallel with its initial banking activities, the BCGE group has founded or acquired specialised subsidiaries to diversify its businesses in the field of finance:

- Capital Transmission SA, a subsidiary created in Geneva in 2008, wholly owned by BCGE. Capital Transmission is a private equity company whose objective is to finance companies through equity or quasi-equity.
- Dimension SA, a wholly owned subsidiary acquired in 2015. Founded in 1994 in Lausanne and specialised in mergers and acquisitions, the company is dedicated to the transfer and acquisition of companies (advice, analysis of the potential for value creation, implementation of transactions).
- Loyal Finance AG, acquired in 2019. Loyal Finance is an asset management company founded in 1991 and based in Zurich, specialising in bond market investment.

== See also ==
- Banking in Switzerland
