= Schwyzer Kantonalbank =

Coordinates: 47.020816°N 8.651142°E

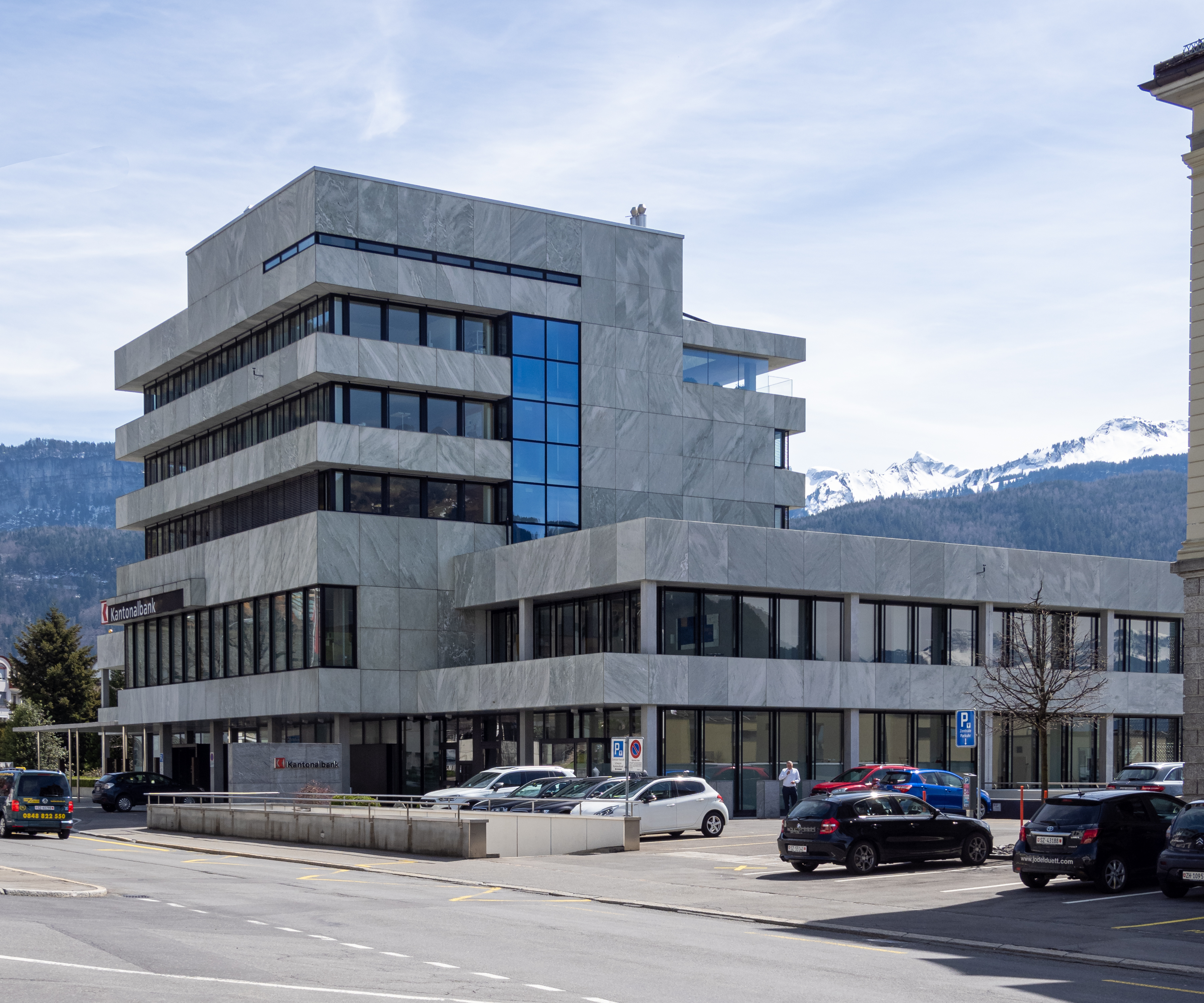
- Schwyzer Kantonalbank headquarters on Bahnhofstrasse, Schwyz
- Company type: Public-law institution
- Industry: Financial services
- Founded: 1890; 136 years ago
- Headquarters: Schwyz, Switzerland
- Number of locations: 23 branches; 2 commercial client centres; 2 private banking offices; 2 compliance centres; 1 pension centre
- Area served: Canton of Schwyz
- Key people: Susanne Thelung (CEO); Lorenz D. Keller (Deputy CEO); Dr August Benz (Bank President)
- Services: Banking services
- Total assets: 22.1 billion CHF
- Number of employees: 614 (2022)
- Website: www.szkb.ch

Schwyzer Kantonalbank is a Swiss cantonal bank serving and wholly owned by the Swiss Canton of Schwyz. The head office is based in Schwyz.

== History ==
Schwyzer Kantonalbank (SZKB) was founded in 1890. Since 1908, the bank has also managed the Swiss National Bank in Schwyz. By 1970, Schwyzer Kantonalbank had assets over 1bn CHF. In 1972, they began operation of ATMs. In 1990, the bank had assets over 5bn CHF. In 1994, the company moved into an extension of its headquarters in the city. In 1999, Schwyzer Kantonalbank opened their website and telephone banking options.

By 2006, Schwyzer Kantonalbank had 10bn CHF in assets. They also set up an innovation foundation in the same year. In 2008, Verena Gwerder was the first woman Bank Councillor of the bank.

In 2020, the bank hired its first woman CEO – Susanne Thellung. The assets of the bank passed 20bn CHF for the first time.

== Products and services ==
Schwyzer Kantonalbank offer services including savings and current accounts, credit cards, investments, mortgages and loan facilities. The bank offers services to both corporate and private customers.

In 2022, Standard and Poor's rating of the bank was AA+.

== Organisational structure ==
Schwyzer Kantonalbank has two leadership sections. The first is the Bank Council, who are the main governing body, a group of nine members who are elected by the canton. Currently led by Dr August Benz. The management and daily operations is run by a group of five, led by CEO Susanne Thellung.

== See also ==
- Cantonal bank
- List of banks
- List of banks in Switzerland
