= Basellandschaftliche Kantonalbank =

Coordinates: 47.4859°N 7.7321°E

- Company type: Public
- Traded as: SIX: BLKB
- ISIN: CH0001473559
- Industry: Financial services
- Founded: 1864; 162 years ago
- Headquarters: Switzerland
- Services: Banking
- Operating income: 356.52 mln CHF (2014)
- Total assets: 21 759.16 mln CHF (2014)
- Number of employees: 636 (2014)
- Website: www.blkb.ch

Basellandschaftliche Kantonalbank (BLKB) is a Swiss cantonal bank which is one of the 24 cantonal banks serving Switzerland's 26 cantons. The bank was founded in 1864.

As of 2014, BLKB had 23 branches across Switzerland with 636 employees; total assets of the bank were 21 759.16 mln CHF. Headquartered in Liestal (Basel-Landschaft), Basellandschaftliche Kantonalbank has full state guarantee of its liabilities.

== See also ==
- Cantonal bank
- List of banks in Switzerland
