= Zuger =

Zuger is a surname. Notable people with the surname include:

- Beat Züger (1961–2023), Swiss chess master
- Joe Zuger (1940–2024), American and Canadian football player

== See also ==
- Zuger Kantonalbank, bank based in Switzerland
- Zuger Kirschtorte, layer cake from Switzerland
- Zuger See, lake in Switzerland
