= Schaffhausen (disambiguation) =

Schaffhausen is a town in Switzerland. Schaffhausen could also refer to:

- Canton of Schaffhausen, a canton of Switzerland, centered at the eponymous town

- Schaffhausen District, a district within the canton
- Schaffhausen railway station, a train station within the town
- Schaffhauser Kantonalbank, a bank of the canton

- Aaron Schaffhausen (fl. 2012), American murderer
- Joanna Schaffhausen, American novelist

== See also ==
- Nicolaus Schafhausen
- Hermann Schaaffhausen
- Schaffhauseria
- Schafhausen i.E. railway station
