= Banque cantonale du Valais =

Coordinates: 46.2299°N 7.3604°E

Banque Cantonale du Valais
- German-language logo

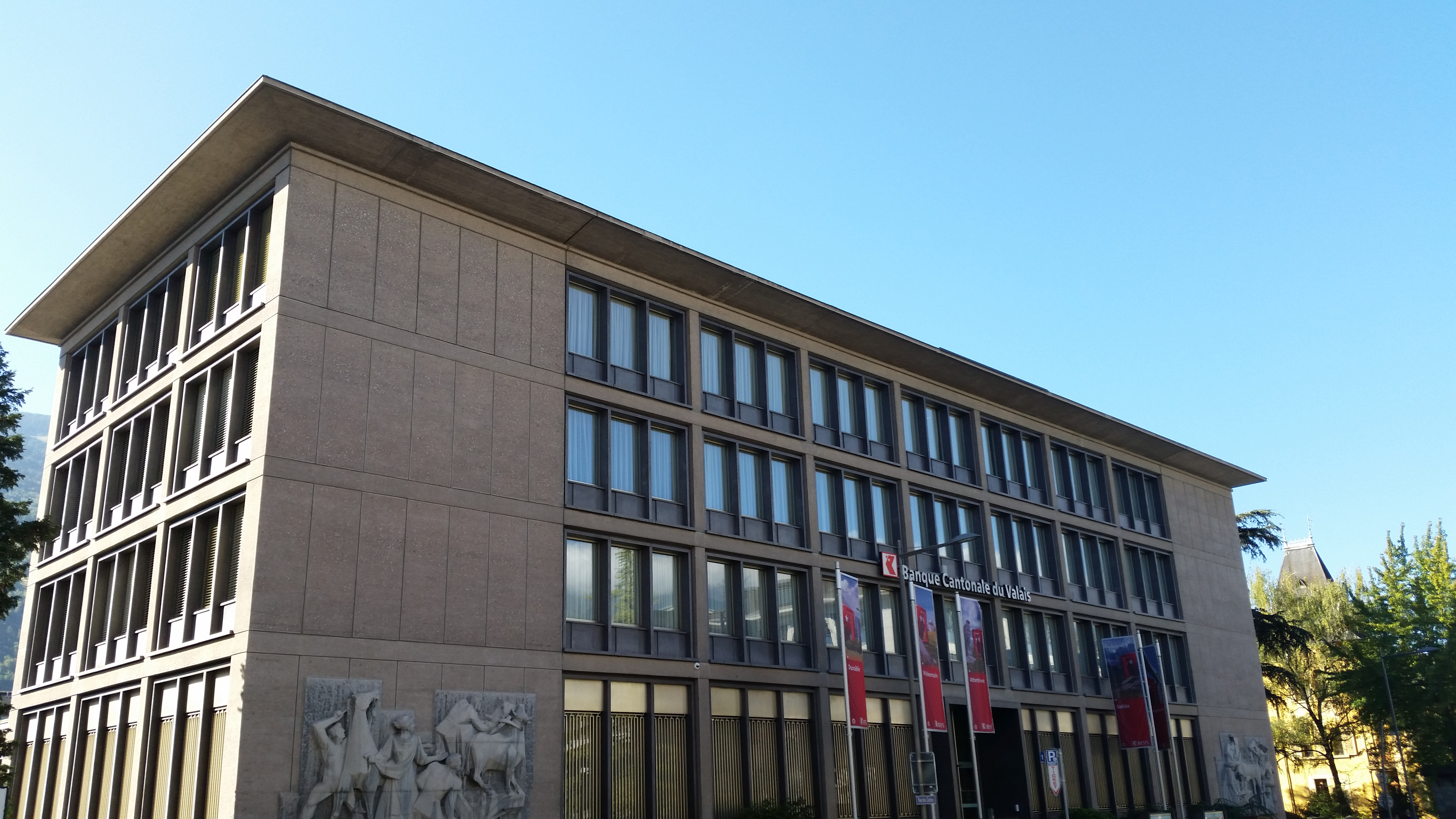
- Company type: Public-law institution
- Traded as: SIX: WKBN
- ISIN: CH0305951201
- Industry: Financial services
- Founded: 1917; 109 years ago
- Headquarters: Sion, Switzerland
- Services: Banking
- Operating income: 142 mln CHF (31.12.2025)
- Number of employees: 561 (2025)
- Website: www.bcvs.ch

Banque Cantonale du Valais (BCVS) is a public limited company limited company and is listed on the Swiss stock exchange (SIX Swiss Exchange). Banque Cantonale du Valais was founded in 1917

On 1 January 1993, the Bank was transformed into a public limited company limited company, making its share capital available to the public.

In 2017, the Bank celebrated its 100th anniversary, which was characterised by numerous events.

As at 31 December 2025, the Bank has 561 employees and had 22 branches spread throughout Valais, divided into three regions: Upper Valais, Central Valais and Lower Valais.

It has full state guarantee of its liabilities.

== See also ==
- Cantonal bank
- List of banks in Switzerland
