= Banca dello Stato del Cantone Ticino =

Swiss cantonal bank

Coordinates: 46.1957°N 9.0246°E

- Industry: financial service activities, except insurance and pension funding
- Founded: 1915
- Headquarters: Switzerland
- Services: Banking
- Total assets: 18,620.37 million CHF (2022)
- Number of employees: 427 (2015)
- Website: bancastato.ch

Banca dello Stato del Cantone Ticino is a Swiss cantonal bank which is part of the 24 cantonal banks serving Switzerland's 26 cantons. Founded in 1915, it has branches across Ticino with 427 employees in 2015. Total assets of the bank were 18,620.37 million CHF in 2022.It has full state guarantee of its liabilities.

In 2013, 75% of its income came from lending interests, leading the bank to consider acquiring a private banking unit to diversify its assets.

== See also ==
- List of banks in Switzerland
