= Luzerner Kantonalbank =

Coordinates: 47.0495°N 8.3068°E

- Industry: Financial services
- Founded: 1850
- Headquarters: Luzern, Switzerland
- Services: Banking
- Operating income: 451.61 mln CHF (2014)
- Total assets: 29 381.43 mln CHF (2014)
- Number of employees: 948 (2014)
- Website: lukb.ch

Luzerner Kantonalbank is the cantonal bank and the dominant retail banking group in the Swiss canton of Lucerne, with a market share of 50-60%. Its main focus is on financing small businesses and personal mortgages in the local economy, the bank has avoided some of the issues facing its larger peers in Switzerland and non-performing loans remain at negligible levels.

== See also ==
- List of Banks in Switzerland
