= Aargauische Kantonalbank =

Swiss bank

Coordinates: 47.3914°N 8.0496°E

Aargau Cantonal Bank

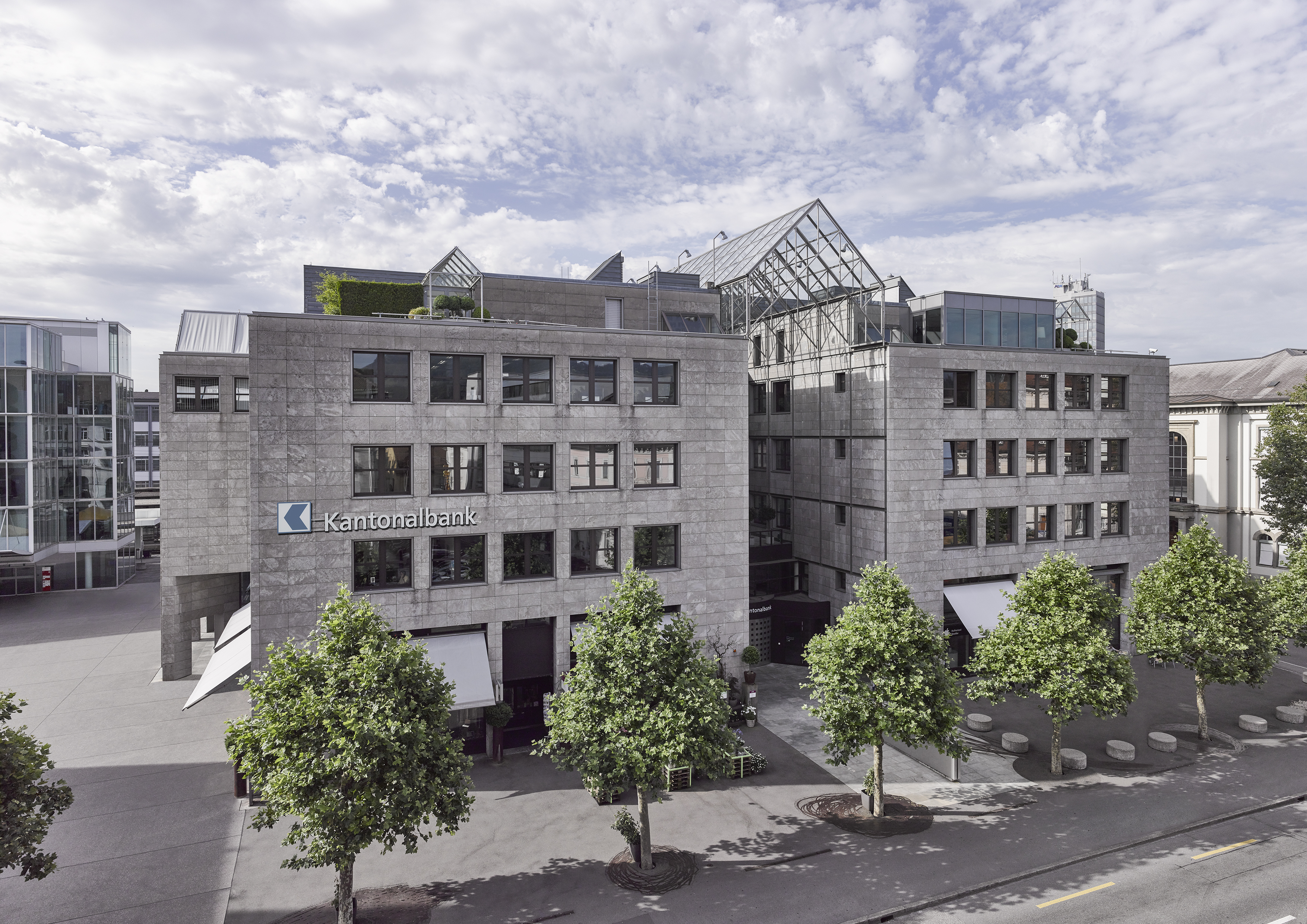
- Aargauische Kantonalbank Head Office
- Native name: Aargauische Kantonalbank
- Industry: Financial services
- Founded: 1913
- Headquarters: Aarau, Switzerland
- Number of locations: 32
- Services: Banking
- Total assets: 31 777.48 mln CHF (2020)
- Number of employees: 832 (2021)
- Website: akb.ch

Aargauische Kantonalbank is a cantonal bank based in the canton of Aargau, Switzerland. Its head office is situated at Aarau (AG). Founded in 1913, Aargau Cantonal Bank in 2021 had 832 employees and 32 offices in Switzerland, total assets were 31 777.48 mln CHF.

== History ==
Founded in 1855 as Aargauische Bank, the company rebranded in 1913 to Aargauische Kantonalbank. Later on, it acquired Freiämter Bank SLO in 1994 and Sparkasse Mättenwil in 1999. In 1999, the bank also opened a subsidiary in Olten in the canton of Solothurn which, after the cessation of activity of the cantonal bank of Solothurn (Solothurnische Kantonalbank) following a financial meltdown, no longer had a cantonal bank.

== See also ==
- Cantonal bank
- List of banks
- List of banks in Switzerland
