= Cantonal bank =

Swiss banking company

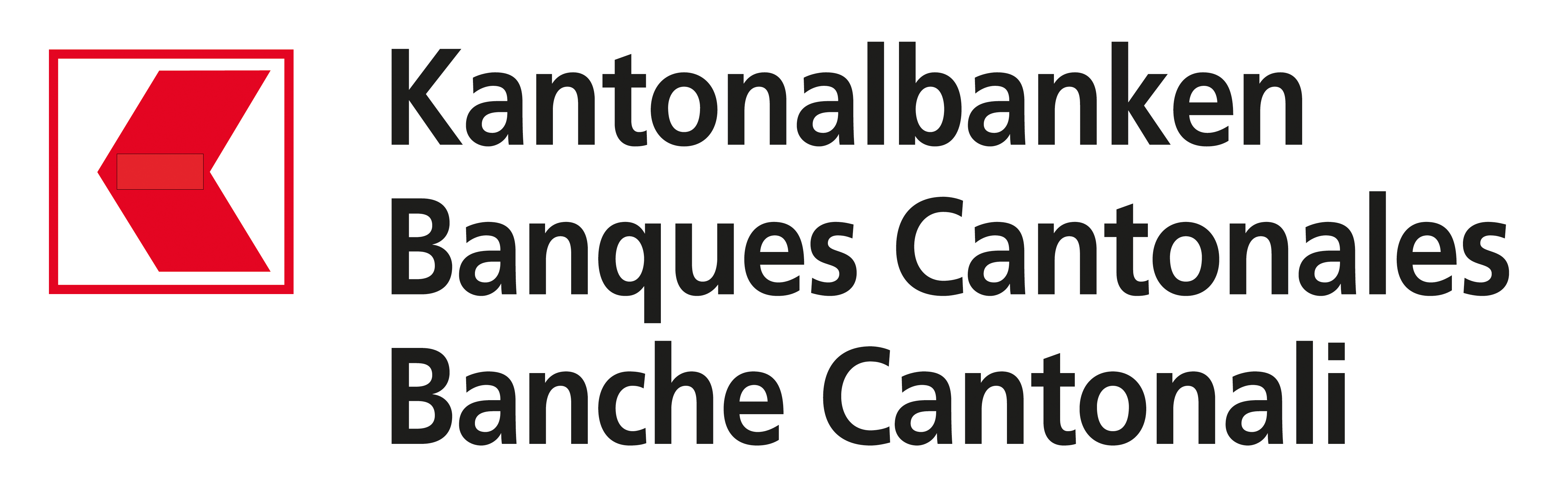
Logo of the Association of Swiss Cantonal Banks.

The cantonal banks (German: Kantonalbank, French: banque cantonale, Italian: banca cantonale) are 24 Swiss government-owned commercial banks. Most of them were founded between 1834 and 1916, although the Banque cantonale du Jura was founded in 1979, as the canton of Jura was not formed until 1978, by its separation from the Canton of Berne. 21 are provided by the canton in which they are based, with a guarantee for the assets held there.

== Description ==
Traditionally, cantonal banks are especially strong in savings and mortgage products. Currently they are in the process of being partially privatized. The cantonal banks are organised and regulated by the Association of Swiss Cantonal Banks, with its office in Basel.

As a group, the cantonal banks account for about 30% of the banking sector in Switzerland, with a network of over 800 branches and 16 000 employees in Switzerland. In 2021 the consolidated total assets of all cantonal banks were around 750 bln CHF, which is comparable with those of the "Big Banks": UBS and Credit Suisse. Some cantonal banks offer 100% deposit insurance to their clients, whereas Swiss-domiciled banks are insured for a maximum of 100,000 CHF via the esisuisse deposit insurance scheme.

There are 24 cantonal banks, one in each canton of the country, except for the cantons of Appenzell Ausserrhoden, which sold its bank to banking rival UBS, and Solothurn, which privatized its bank in 1995 after a scandal. Each bank uses a distinctive motif as the logo, with a cantonal colour on white used as the colours of the bank, e.g. light blue for Zürcher Kantonalbank (Zurich Cantonal Bank). Despite appearances, cantonal banks are not small private banks: in fact two of them, the Zürcher Kantonalbank and the Banque cantonale vaudoise, are the second and third biggest banks in Switzerland (after UBS).

== List of cantonal banks ==
List of cantonal banks with balance sheet and income statement information from December 2022
| Logo | Name | Canton | Est. | Assets (CHF billions) | Consolidated profit (CHF millions) |
|---|---|---|---|---|---|
| | Zürcher Kantonalbank | Zürich | 1870 | 199.8 | 1,058.7 |
| | Banque cantonale vaudoise | Vaud | 1845 | 59.4 | 388.3 |
| gauche | Basler Kantonalbank | Basel-Stadt | 1899 | 55.2 | 139 |
| | St. Galler Kantonalbank | St. Gallen | 1915 | 40.8 | 183.8 |
| gauche | Berner Kantonalbank | Banque Cantonale Bernoise | Bern | 1834 | 39.8 | 159.6 |
| | Luzerner Kantonalbank | Lucerne | 1850 | 57 | 226.6 |
| | Aargauische Kantonalbank | Aargau | 1913 | 38.1 | 179 |
| | Basellandschaftliche Kantonalbank | Basel-Landschaft | 1864 | 34.8 | 130 |
| | Thurgauer Kantonalbank | Thurgau | 1871 | 33.3 | 147.8 |
| | Graubündner Kantonalbank | Banca Chantunala Grischuna | Banca Cantonale Grigione | Grisons | 1870 | 33.2 | 207.5 |
| | Banque cantonale de Genève | Geneva | 1861 | 30 | 176 |
| | Schwyzer Kantonalbank | Schwyz | 1890 | 23.6 | 79.9 |
| | Zuger Kantonalbank | Zug | 1892 | 18.6 | 97.2 |
| | Banque cantonale de Fribourg | Freiburger Kantonalbank | Fribourg | 1892 | 27.3 | 141.1 |
| | Banque cantonale du Valais | Walliser Kantonalbank | Valais | 1916 | 19.3 | 72.9 |
| | Banca dello Stato del Cantone Ticino | Ticino | 1915 | 18.6 | 64.4 |
| | Banque cantonale neuchâteloise | Neuchâtel | 1883 | 11.3 | 42.6 |
| | Schaffhauser Kantonalbank | Schaffhausen | 1883 | 9.2 | 55.3 |
| | Glarner Kantonalbank | Glarus | 1884 | 8.6 | 25.3 |
| | Nidwaldner Kantonalbank | Nidwalden | 1879 | 6.2 | 16 |
| | Obwaldner Kantonalbank | Obwalden | 1886 | 5.9 | 13.8 |
| | Urner Kantonalbank | Uri | 1915 | 3.6 | 17.1 |
| gauche | Appenzeller Kantonalbank | Appenzell Innerrhoden | 1899 | 4.1 | 11.9 |
| | Banque cantonale du Jura | Jura | 1979 | 4.3 | 10.2 |
| | Total | | | 782.4 | 3,644.6 |
