= Schaffhauser Kantonalbank =

Swiss cantonal bank

- Company type: Public-law institution
- Industry: Financial services
- Founded: 1883; 143 years ago
- Headquarters: Schaffhausen, Switzerland
- Number of locations: 6 branches
- Area served: Canton of Schaffhausen
- Key people: Alain Schmid (CEO); Florian Hotz (Bank President)
- Services: Banking
- Total assets: 8.83 mln CHF
- Owner: Canton of Schaffhausen
- Number of employees: 300 (2022)
- Website: www.shkb.ch

Schaffhauser Kantonalbank is a Swiss cantonal bank that serves and is based in Schaffhausen. It is wholly owned by the Swiss Canton of Schaffhausen and serves the area with six branches and ten ATMs. The bank offers both public and commercial banking services including savings, cards, real estate and investments.

== History ==
Schaffhauser Kantonalbank was founded in 1883.

In 2015, the bank had to pay $1.6mln USD to the Department of Justice for unpaid tax of 182 accounts held by US customers.

As of 2020, the bank had assets of 8.83mln CHF (2020) and recorded a profit of 45.96mln CHF. By market share, Schaffhauser Kantonalbank was the 46th largest bank in Switzerland, and 18th largest Kantonalbank.

== Management structure ==
The Bank Council is the supervisory body of the Schaffhauser Kantonalbank. This consists of nine members and is currently chaired by Florian Hotz. The Canton of Schaffhausen determines the members.

The organisational management is led by Martin Vogel, CEO. He previously worked for Schweizerischer Bankverein and UBS.

== Locations ==
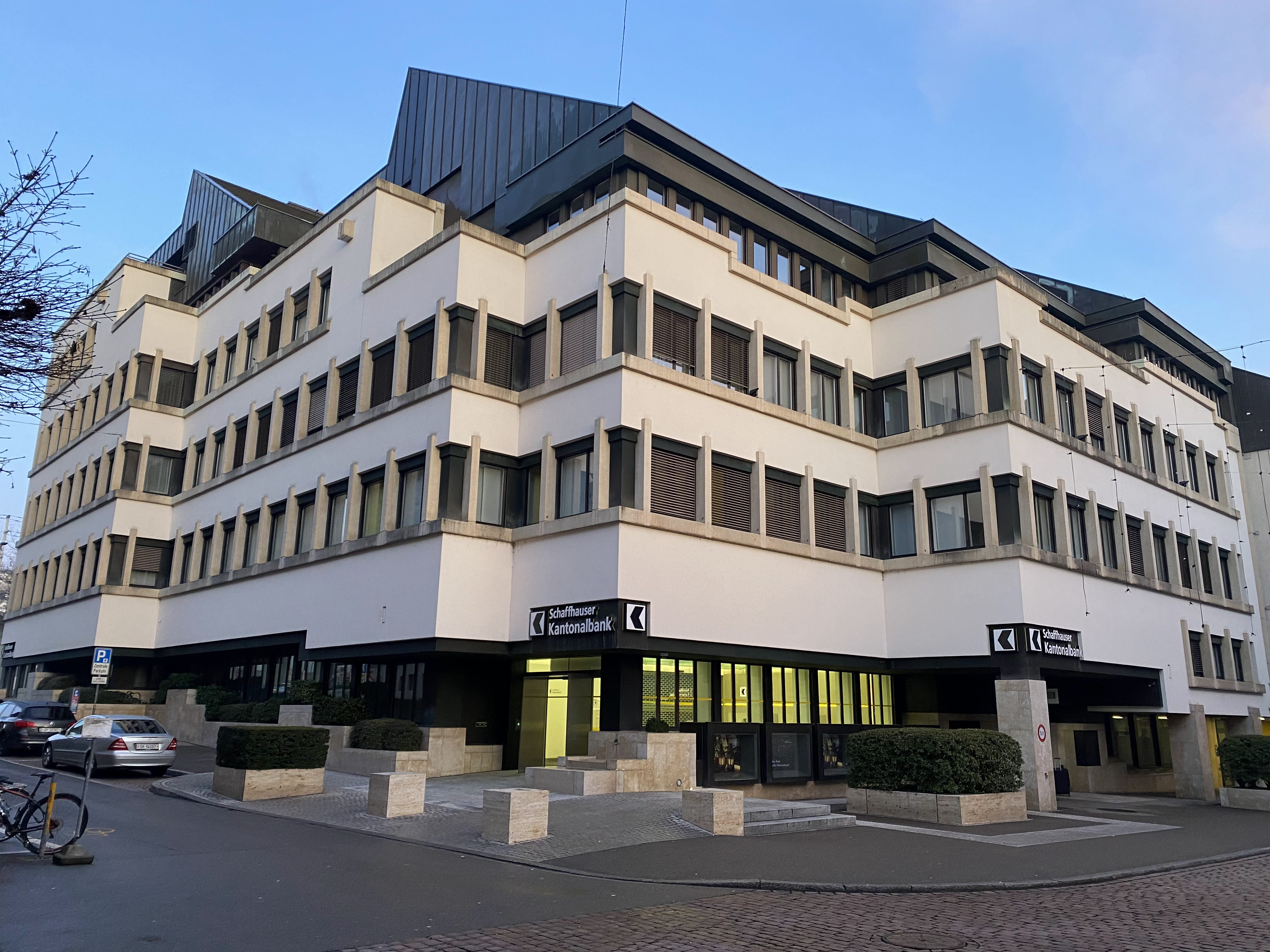
The Schaffhausen branch

Schaffhauser Kantonalbank operate six main branches in the canton:

- Schaffhausen
- Neuhausen am Rheinfall
- Stein am Rhein
- Thayngen
- Ramsen
- Gächlingen

== See also ==
- Cantonal bank
- List of banks
- List of banks in Switzerland
