= Zuger Kantonalbank =

Cantonal bank based in Switzerland

Coordinates: 47.1735°N 8.5163°E

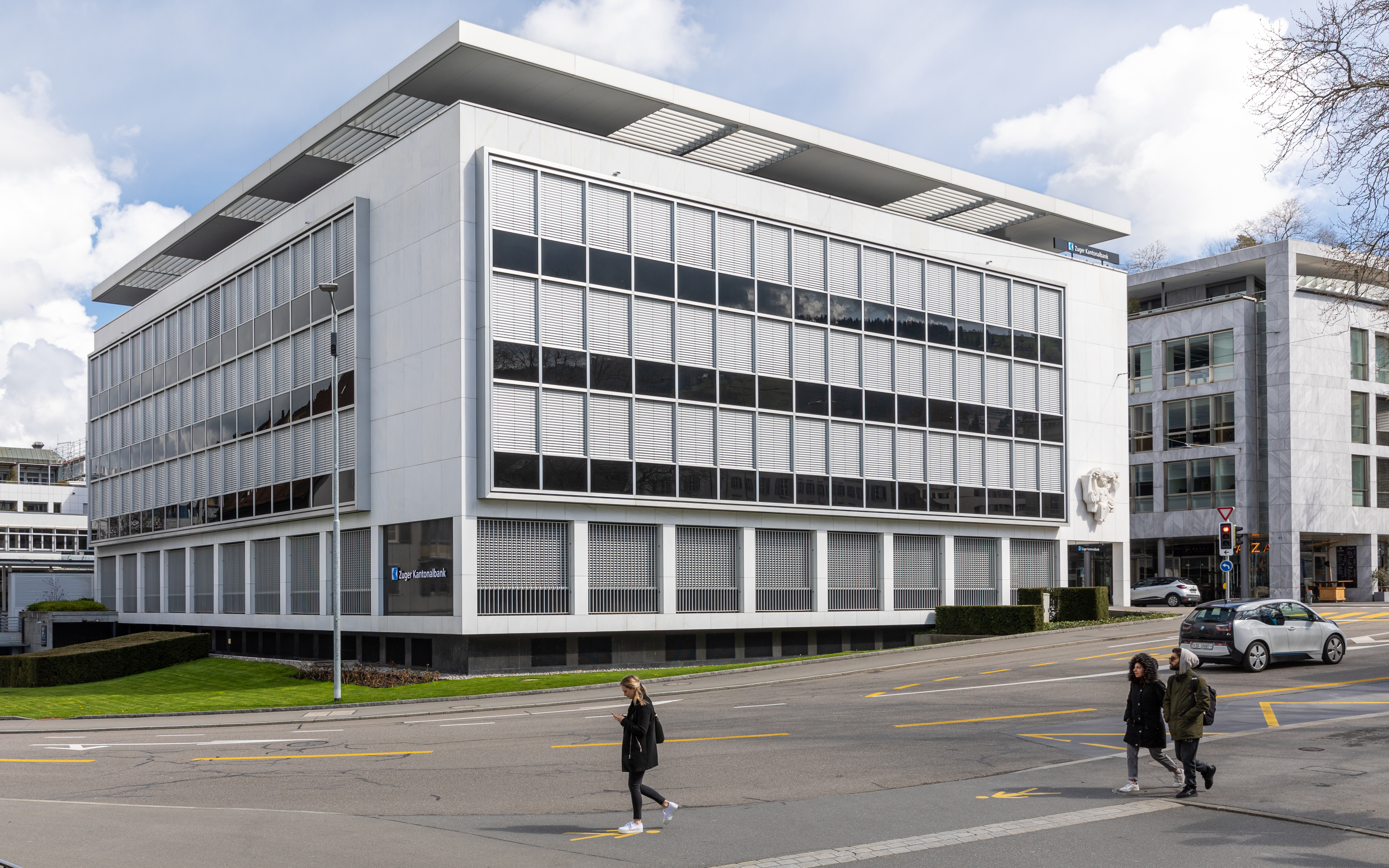
- Type: Public (Aktiengesellschaft)
- Traded as: SIX: ZUGER
- ISIN: CH0493891243
- Industry: Financial services
- Founded: 1892
- Headquarters: Zug, Switzerland
- Number of locations: 14 (2014)
- Area served: Canton of Zug
- Services: Banking
- Operating income: 208.92 mln CHF (2014)
- Total assets: 13.82 bln CHF
- Website: www.zugerkb.ch

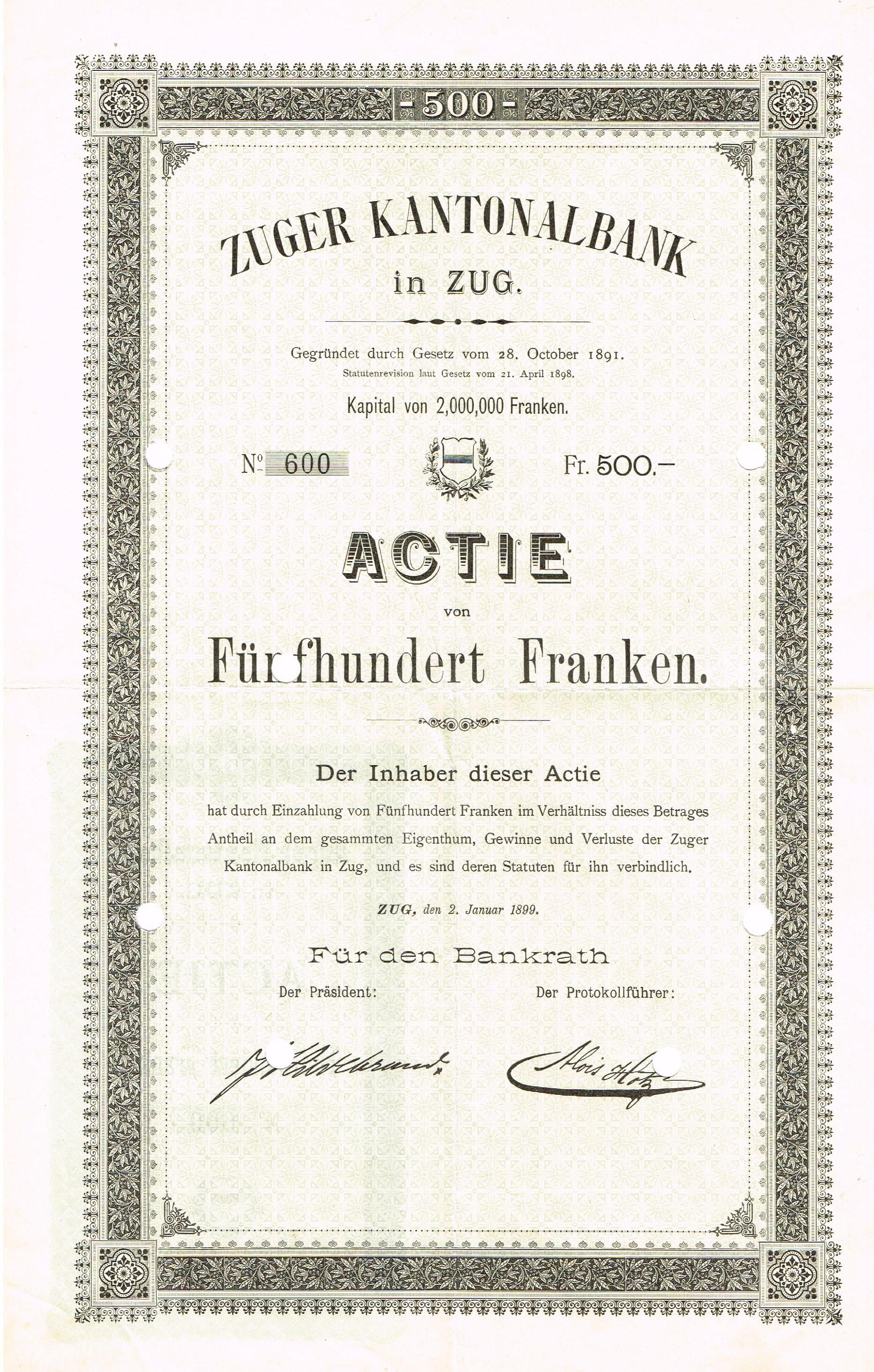
Share of the Zuger Kantonalbank, issued 2. January 1899

Zuger Kantonalbank is a cantonal bank based in Switzerland. Its head office is situated in Zug, Switzerland. Founded in 1892, Zuger Kantonalbank is a universal bank, providing retail and corporate banking products mainly to the canton residents. The bank has full state guarantee of its liabilities.

== See also ==
- Cantonal bank
- List of banks
- List of banks in Switzerland
