= Banque cantonale du Jura =

Coordinates: 47.4169°N 7.0733°E

Banque Cantonale du Jura

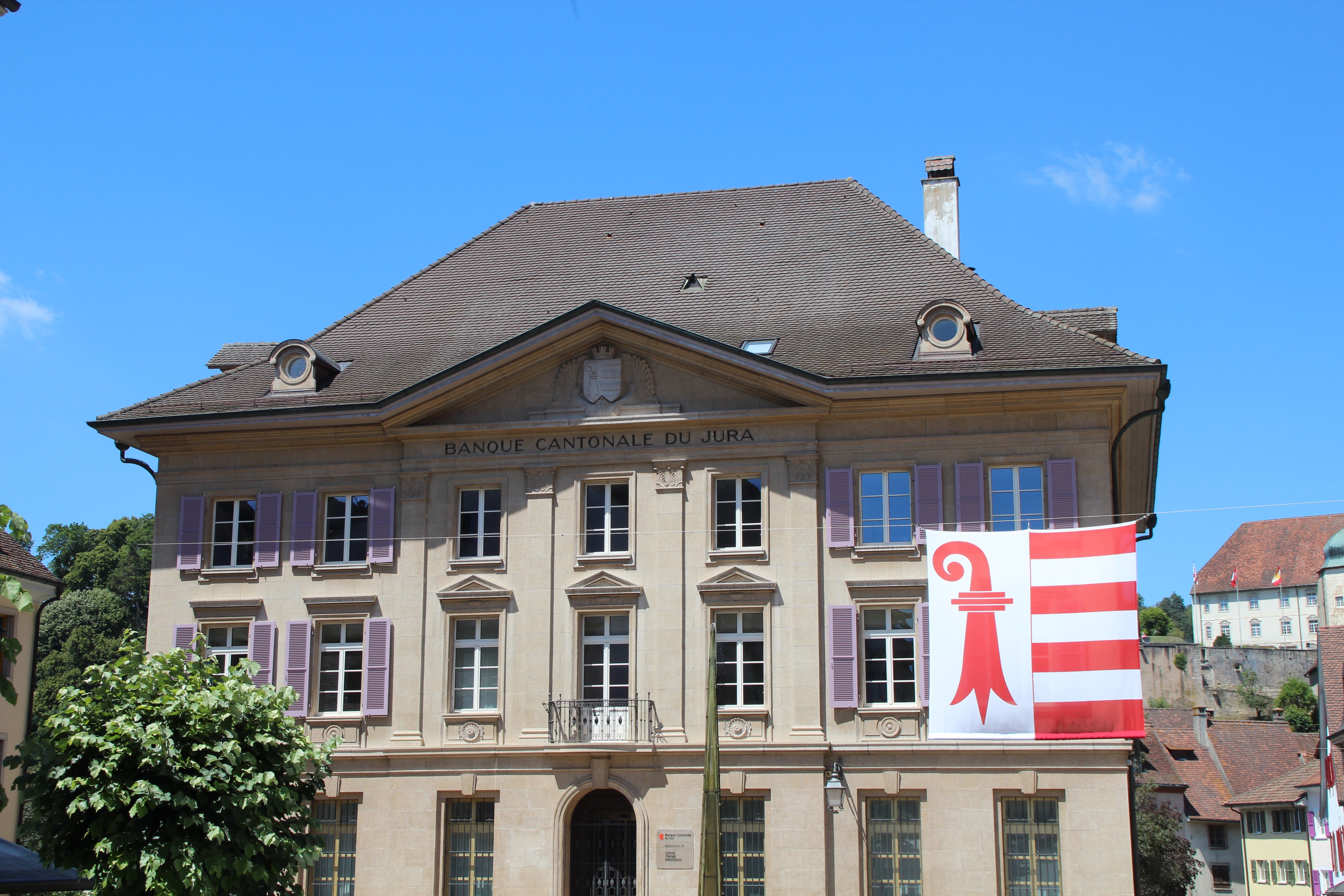
- Company type: Société Anonyme
- Traded as: SIX: BCJ
- ISIN: CH0350665672
- Industry: Financial services
- Founded: 1979; 47 years ago
- Headquarters: Porrentruy
- Services: Banking
- Operating income: 45.02 mln CHF (2014)
- Total assets: 2 575.00 mln CHF (2014)
- Number of employees: 120 (2014)
- Website: www.bcj.ch

Banque Cantonale du Jura is a Swiss cantonal bank which is part of the 24 cantonal banks serving Switzerland's 26 cantons. The bank headquartered in the canton of Jura was founded in 1979.

As of 2014, Banque Cantonale du Jura had 12 branches across Switzerland with 120 employees; total assets of the bank were 2 575.00 mln CHF. Banque Cantonale du Jura has full state guarantee of its liabilities.

== See also ==
- Cantonal bank
- List of banks in Switzerland
