= Migros Bank =

Swiss bank

- Native name: (in German) Migros Bank (in French) Banque Migros (in Italian) Banca Migros
- Industry: Banking
- Founded: 1958; 68 years ago
- Founder: Gottlieb Duttweiler
- Headquarters: Zurich, Switzerland
- Operating income: 226 million CHF (2015)
- Total assets: 42.2 billion CHF (2015)
- Total equity: 3.4 billion CHF (2015)
- Owner: Federation of Migros Cooperatives
- Number of employees: 1,335
- Website: www.migrosbank.ch

Migros Bank is a Swiss bank founded in 1958 by Gottlieb Duttweiler and belongs to the Federation of Migros Cooperatives. It has 67 branches in Switzerland (20 new between 2008 and 2016).

In 2015, it has a balance sheet of 42 billion Swiss francs and an income of 226 million.

In April 2020, Migros Bank agreed to pay German justice authorities around 2.4 million euros to settle allegations that it allowed German clients to evade taxes.

In 2022, Migros Bank's Chairman of the board of directors, Fabrice Zumbrunnen, announced that he would be stepping down from his position.

== See also ==
- Banking in Switzerland
- List of banks in Switzerland
