= Banque Cantonale Vaudoise =

Swiss bank

Coordinates: 46.5191°N 6.6342°E

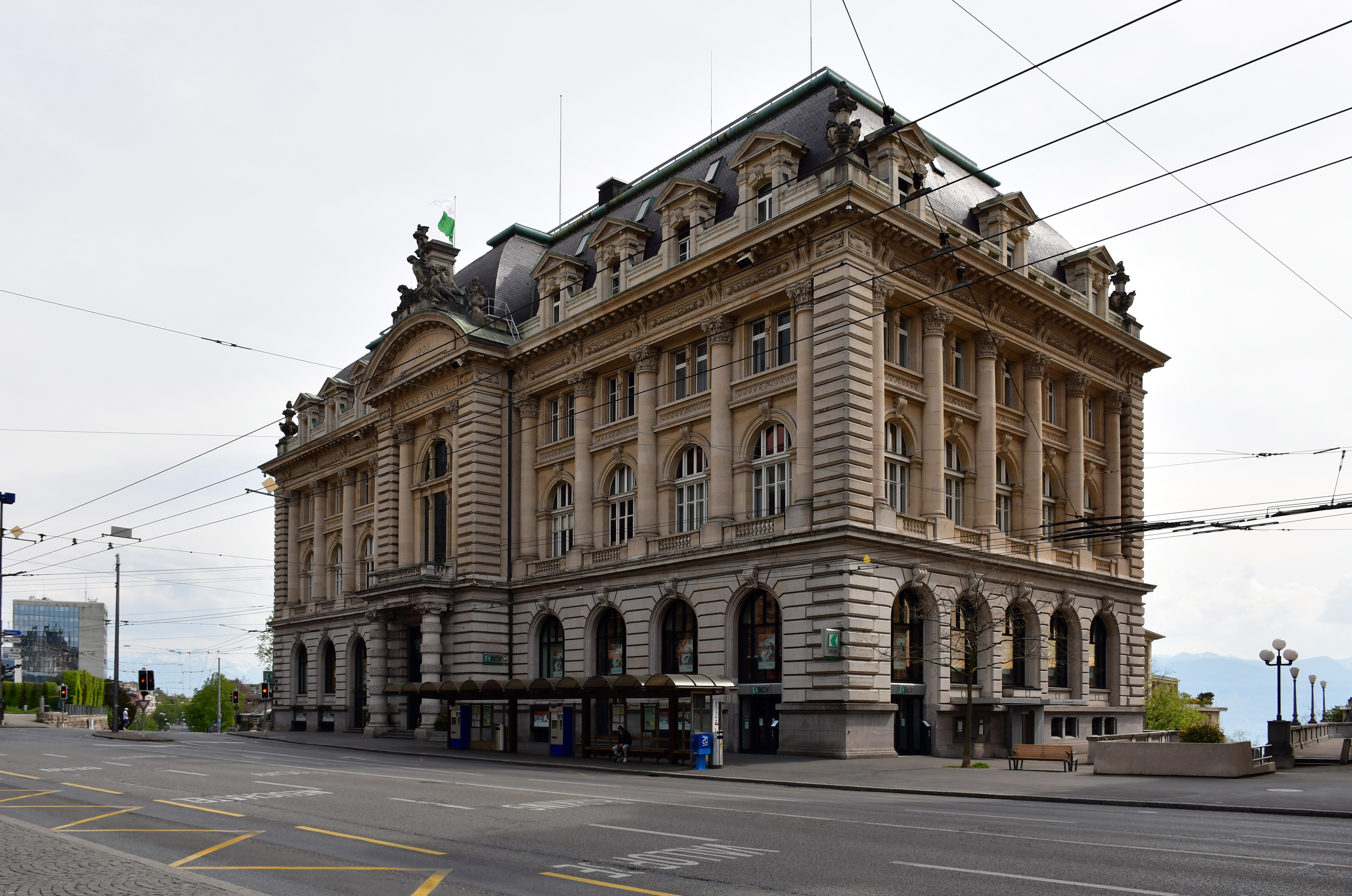
- The headquarters of the Banque cantonale vaudoise, in Lausanne.
- Company type: Public-law institution
- Traded as: SIX: BCVN
- ISIN: CH0531751755
- Industry: Retail banking
- Founded: 19 December 1845; 180 years ago
- Headquarters: Lausanne, Switzerland
- Services: Banking
- Total assets: CHF 47.8 bn (2018)
- Number of employees: 1,896 (2018)
- Website: www.bcv.ch

The Banque Cantonale Vaudoise (BCV) is the cantonal bank of the Swiss Canton of Vaud. Headquartered in Lausanne, it is Vaud's biggest bank by balance sheet. BCV is a universal bank providing retail banking, corporate banking, wealth management, and trading services.

== Activities ==
In the 1990s, several cantonal banks attempted to increase growth outside of their local and cantonal state borders. The expansion strategy of the BCV during this period with Greece and Hong Kong resulted in billions of dollars in losses. In the past, the Swiss taxpayer regularly paid for the damage incurred, even though a cantonal bank, as in the case of the BCV, never had a state guarantee.

In a BCV press release, published in 2011, it was stated that an office was to be opened in Zurich. With its presence in Zurich, BCV Asset Management is driving the expansion of its institutional business in the German-speaking part of Switzerland.

In an interview with the newspaper Le Temps on Sept. 15th 2015, the CEO of BCV, Pascal Kiener, stated with regard to the geographical activities of the bank that the expansion plans of the BCV would be limited to the neighboring countries of Switzerland. Another NZZ newspaper article reports that BCV acted as a lender to a Canadian-Turkish company in the Canadian province of Saskatchewan in that same year. In order to meet and speak with Alanna Koch, the former vice minister of agriculture, Banque Cantonale Vaudoise (BCV) invited Swiss journalists to Regina, Saskatchewans capital.

As part of the Swiss Bank Program of the US Department of Justice, DoJ, the BCV has reached an agreement. By paying a fine of US$41.7 million, the tax dispute between Switzerland and the United States has been settled in December 2015. The Bank had to transmit the names of approximately 200 employees to the US authorities.

The director general of the Vaud Cantonal Bank (BCV), Stefan Bichsel, declared in an interview given in November 2016 on the portal Fundplatt.com that BCV has no longer any branch office abroad. The office in Zurich would be the only one outside of the canton of Vaud.

By 2002 the BCV had accumulated a loss of CHF 1.2 billion, mostly due to bad loans and poor risk management. After a popular vote forcing the Canton to maintain a shareholding majority in the bank, Vaud had to inject 600 million Swiss francs to recapitalize it. The Chairman of the Board at that time, Gilbert Duchoud, was also dismissed by the State Council. In the lengthy process, all bank officers were acquitted of the allegations of balance sheet manipulation and document falsification, with Duchoud being given a suspended 90-day-fine for granting exceedingly large bonuses to some employees.

== See also ==
- Banking in Switzerland
