= CBH Bank =

Swiss bank

CBH Compagnie Bancaire Helvétique SA
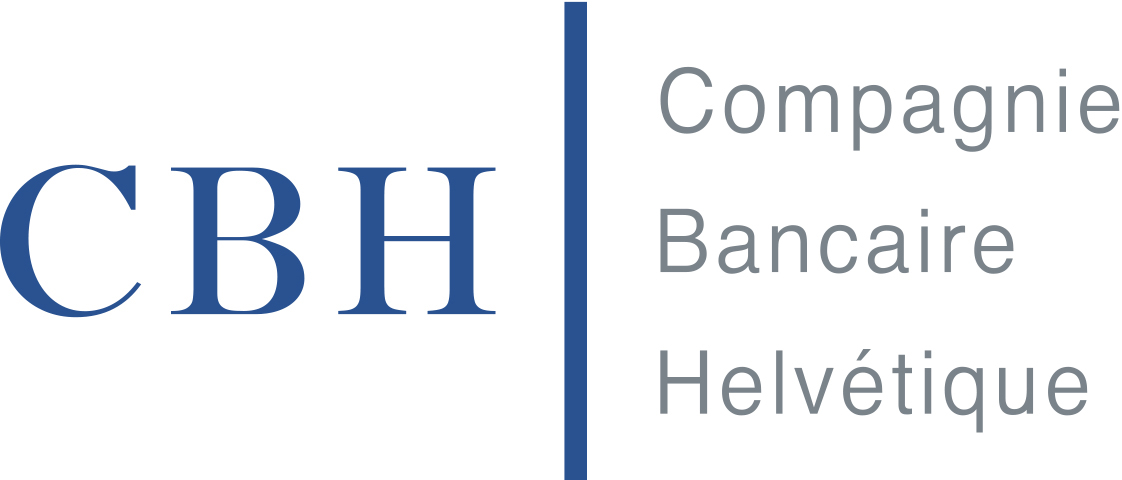
- Industry: Financial services
- Founded: 1975
- Founder: Joseph Benhamou (from 2004)
- Headquarters: Boulevard Emile-Jaques-Dalcroze 7, Geneva, Switzerland
- Area served: Global
- Key people: Simon Benhamou (CEO)
- Products: private banking; asset management
- Total assets: CHF 16.3 billion (31.12.2024)
- Number of employees: approx. 350 (As of 2025)
- Website: https://cbhbank.com

CBH Compagnie Bancaire Helvetique SA is a Swiss brokerage firm owned by the Benhamou family. In 1991, it obtained a full banking license in Switzerland. As of 2025, the group employs approximately 350 people. The current Chief Executive Officer is Simon Benhamou. The bank is based in Geneva, in the Canton of Geneva, and specializes in private banking and asset management.

The CBH banking group is among the 25 largest banks in Switzerland in terms of assets under management and capital. CBH Group has seen its assets under management grow steadily each year, reaching USD 16.3 billion in 2024. In 2010, the bank managed less than USD 2 billion. To date, the bank reports a Tier 1 ratio of 40% and a strong liquidity ratio.

A core focus for the group is on high-net-worth and institutional clientele, with relationships developed throughout Switzerland, Israel, Asia, Eastern Europe, and Latin America.

== History ==
- 1975 – Creation of Stock and Commodity Services, a brokerage company, in Geneva
- 1991 – Swiss Banking license
- 1993 – Creation of 1618 SICAV family of Funds in Luxembourg
- 1993 – Opening of a representative office in St. Moritz
- 1995 – Opening of a fully licensed bank in Nassau, Bahamas
- 2002 – Acquisition of PG Partner Bank AG and creation of a branch in Zürich
- 2010 – Creation of a representative office in Tel Aviv, Israel
- 2012 – Opening of a subsidiary in London, United Kingdom and obtaining of an FSA regulated Investment management license
- 2014 – Acquisition of a major part of the Banque Privée Espirito Santo's Private Banking clientele
- 2016 – Acquisition of TTG (HK) Limited, an independent wealth management company established in Hong Kong
- 2017 – Acquisition of the Private Banking activities of FIBI Bank – Switzerland (First International Bank of Israel) based in Zürich
- 2018 - Acquisition of the Eastern European banking clientele of Schroeder & Co Bank AG part of Schroders Group
- 2020 – Acquisition of minority stake of 30% of FlowBank, an entirely digital bank based in Geneva
- 2022 - The entire 30% stake in FlowBank was sold on March 24, 2022.

== Corporate name, legal form and head office ==
CBH Compagnie Bancaire Helvétique SA is the Group's umbrella company. The Bank is a company whose operations encompass all transactions that fall within the remit of an asset management bank with the status of securities trader. The bank has a branch in Zurich as well as representative offices in St. Moritz and Israel, and also operates via several subsidiaries based in the Bahamas, England, Hong Kong and Brasil. Together these entities form the corporate group CBH Compagnie Bancaire Helvétique.

== Services ==
CBH issues payment and credit cards. It is one of the institutions identified as card issuers in the country.

== Controversies and media ==
=== Reputation "clean up" with Eliminalia ===
According to the story killers project, CBH Bank paid just under 229,000 euros to Eliminalia (a spanish reputation manager) — after hiring one of its partners, ReputationUp — to take down content linking it to offshore companies and money laundering charges.

=== U.S. Venezuela corruption investigation ===
CBH Bank is related in Venezuela corruption cases but without strong evidence. US investigators, after obtaining bank reports, alleged that CBH Bank is being used to launder the proceeds of the fraud and the embezzlement scheme by figures in Venezuela, though CBH themselves is defrauded on the scheme. CBH stated they didn't know about any money laundering activities, and complied with all laws and regulations.

Switzerland’s financial regulator reprimanded CBH Bank for failing to fight money laundering in servicing wealthy Venezuelan offshore clients. Swiss National Councillor Prisca Birrer-Heimo criticized CBH Bank's risk management demanding immediate regulation changes.

=== Kazakhstan corruption investigation ===
Payments from Kazakh oligarchs lead to a complaint of suspected money laundering filed with the Swiss Financial Market Supervisory Authority Finma. A Geneva-based private bank is in the spotlight – not for the first time, Sonntagszeitung reports. The case concerns highly suspicious transactions associated to a clan of Kazakh oligarch Akhmetzhan Yessimov.

CBH is mentioned in an article of newspaper The Telegraph about Aliya Nazarbayeva, the youngest daughter of Nursultan Nazarbayev, the first President of Kazakhstan. Indeed the article relates the saying of Alya Nazarbayeva during a London high court hearing against her former personal financial advisor whom she accuses of wrongdoing. Among other accusations, she stated that allegedly under his recommendation she directed him to seek the purchase of a 51% stake of the CBH Bank. In 2016, Ms Nazarbayeva discovered that the $108 million meant to be invested in a into a controlling stake in CBH Bank were misappropriated by her personal advisor.

=== Florian Homm ===
Absolute Capital Management (ACM), a hedge fund managed by Florian Homm, once reached a volume of up to three billion US dollars, but collapsed in 2007. Investors are said to have lost 200 million US dollars. Charged with investment fraud in the U.S., he disappeared in 2007. After his resignation, Florian Homm was accused by the remaining management of his company of having valued many of the assets much higher than their actual value. His wife withdrew money from CBH Bank accounts.

=== CBH Bahamas ===
CBH's “serious error and negligence” resulted in fraudsters plundering more than $2m from one of its client’s accounts, Bahamas' Supreme Court revealed. Justice Ian Winder, in a May 12, 2022, ruling blasted CBH Bahamas for “failing to exercise the requisite due care and skill expected” when it failed to detect signs it was communicating with criminals.

=== Venezuela-Gold Ingots story ===
In a story August 3, 2020, about a Venezuelan official allegedly hiding unexplained wealth by buying gold, The Associated Press erroneously reported some financial information about the Banco CBH. The bank's assets under management for clients located in Latin America and the Caribbean accounted for 19% of its business last year. AP corrected the story and specified that Banco CBH has no relationship with what was written in the wrong news.
