= Zurich Cantonal Bank =

Largest cantonal bank in Switzerland

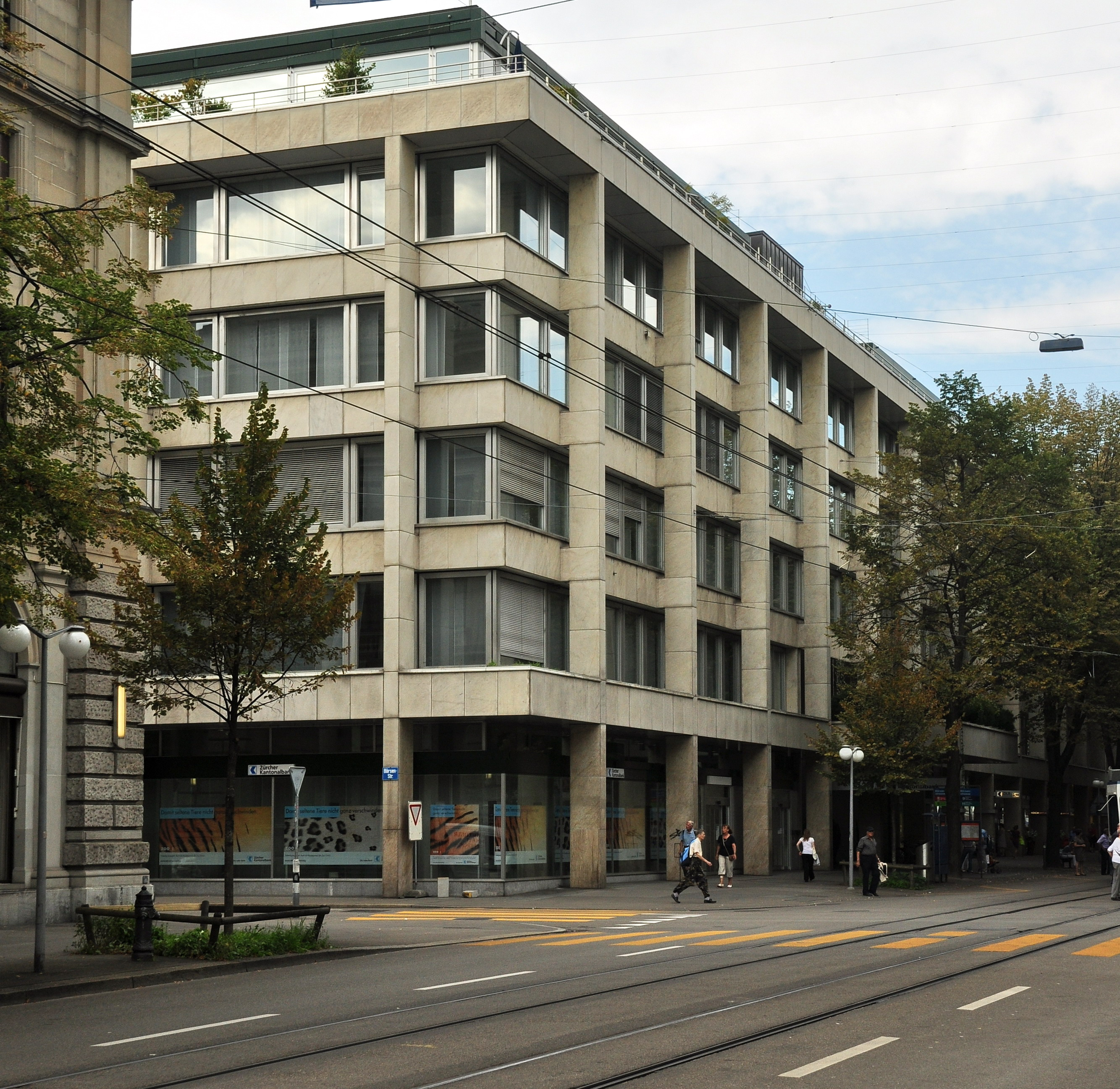
- Native name: Zürcher Kantonalbank (ZKB)
- Type: Incorporated public-law institution
- Industry: Banking; Financial services
- Founded: 15 February 1870
- Headquarters: Bahnhofstrasse 9 Zürich; 8010 Switzerland
- Area served: Canton of Zürich
- Key people: Dr. oec. HSG Jörg Müller-Ganz, Chairman (since 2011), Member of the Board of Directors (since 2007); Urs Baumann, CEO (since 2022)
- Products: Retail banking; Commercial banking; Investment banking; Investment management; Private equity
- Operating income: CHF 3,213 million (2026)
- Net income: CHF 1,241 million (2026)
- Total assets: CHF 206 billion (2026)
- Number of employees: 6655 (2026)
- Website: www.zkb.ch/en

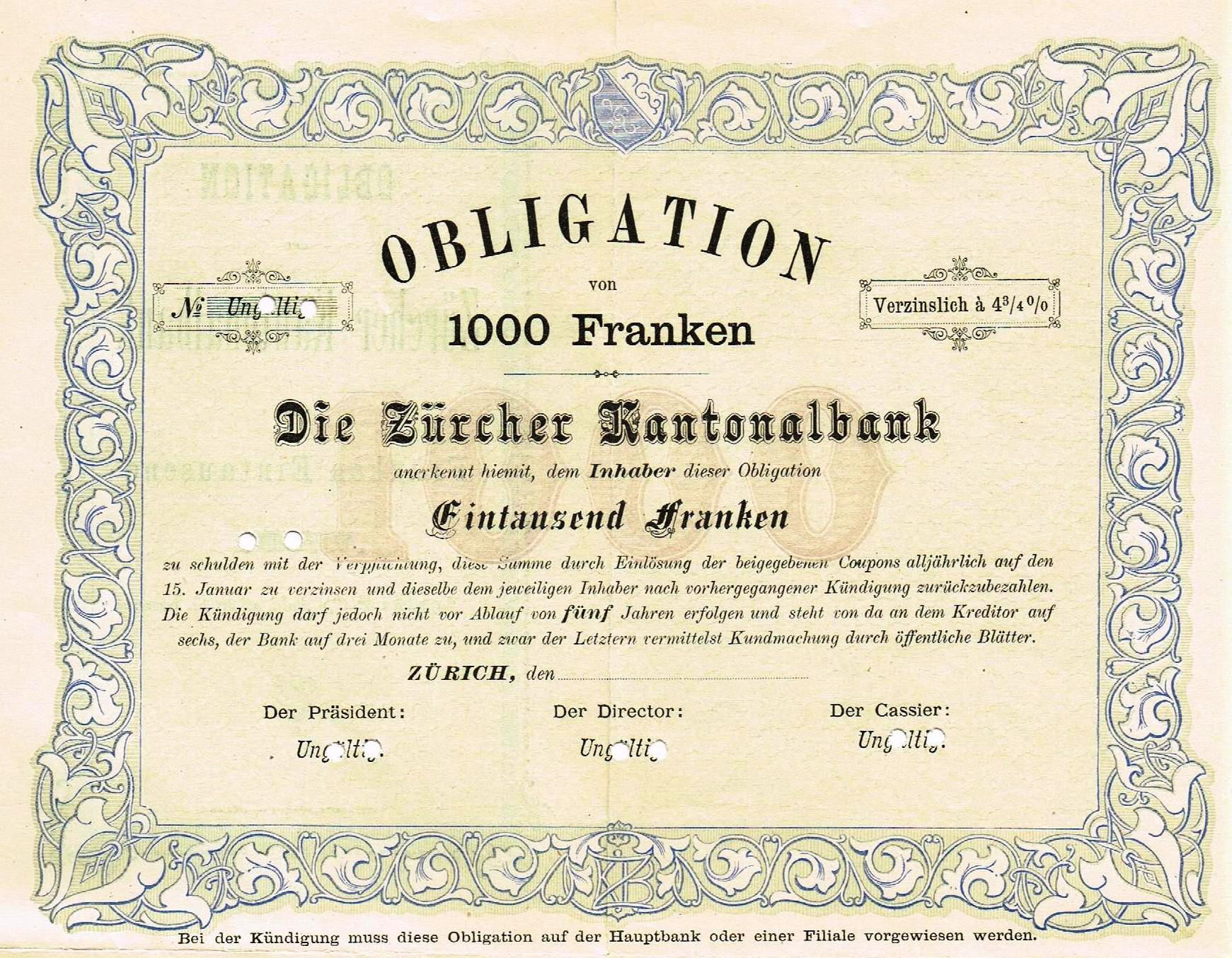
Bond of the Zürcher Kantonalbank, issued 1879

Zurich Cantonal Bank (German: Zürcher Kantonalbank, or ZKB) is the largest cantonal bank and third largest bank in Switzerland, with total assets of over CHF 206 billion.

ZKB, as an independent, incorporated public-law institution, is wholly owned by the canton of Zürich. Ultimate supervision of ZKB is the responsibility of the Cantonal Council of Zürich, whose duties are laid down in Zürich's Cantonal Bank Act.

Under the law, the canton of Zürich bears responsibility for all ZKB's liabilities should the bank's resources prove inadequate. This cantonal guarantee acts as a stabilising force for the financial market as a whole, particularly in times of economic uncertainty.

== History ==
The Zurich Cantonal Bank was founded in 1870 as "bank of the citizens of Zürich" following an initiative of Johann Jakob Keller (1823–1903), then member of the cantonal council of Zürich. The canton of Zürich provided the necessary endowment capital and appointed the senior governing bodies. The public service mandate and the corresponding social and political responsibility were established by law.

In October 2026, Global Finance magazine rated ZKB second safest bank in the world, on the basis of it being one of few financial institutions that enjoyed a triple Standard & Poor's, Fitch and Moody's AAA/Aaa rating globally.

In November 2013, Zürcher Kantonalbank was classified as a systemically important bank in Switzerland by order of the Swiss National Bank, alongside UBS, Credit Suisse, Raiffeisen (Switzerland) and PostFinance, and must meet stricter capital requirements and prepare contingency plans for times of crisis.

== Network ==
With 51 outlets, ZKB is the largest network of branches in the canton of Zürich.

ZKB also maintains a network of international representatives and regional advisory offices in Beijing, Mumbai, Singapore, and São Paulo.

== ZKB Gold ETF ==
On 15 March 2006, Zurich Cantonal Bank launched the ZKB Gold ETF, which is listed in Switzerland under the symbol ZGLD. The fund invests exclusively in physical gold. The ETF has three unit classes traded in different currencies: USD, EUR, and CHF. Shares are sold in 1 ounce gold units, with a minimum purchase of one unit (one ounce).

Units are normally bought and sold for cash. For payment in kind, only integral 12.5 kg ingots are assured (subject to the total holding). The NAV is based on closing prices on the New York exchange according to Bloomberg Golds Comdty HP.

== See also ==
- Banking in Switzerland
- List of Banks in Switzerland
- Gold exchange-traded fund
