= Association of Swiss Cantonal Banks =

Voluntary association

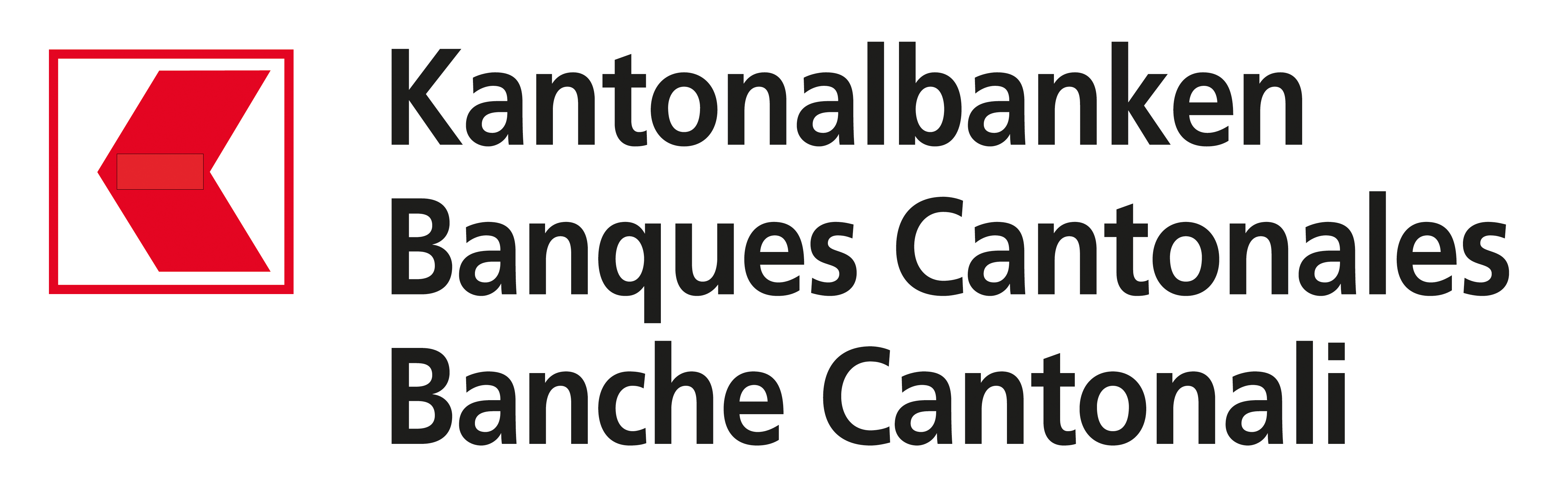
- Founded: 1907
- Headquarters: Basel, Switzerland
- Key people: Hanspeter Hess (director); Bruno Thürig (chairman)
- Members: 24 Cantonal banks

The Association of Swiss Cantonal Banks (German: Verband Schweizerischer Kantonalbanken, French: Union des Banques Cantonales Suisses, Italian: Unione delle Banche Cantonali Svizzere) is an association of the 24 cantonal banks in Switzerland. Its purpose is to safeguard the common interests and promote cooperation between its members and to strengthen the position of the cantonal banks in Switzerland. The association, organised in the legal form of an association, was founded in 1907 and has had an office at its statutory headquarters in Basel since 1971.

== Organisation ==
The supreme body of the ASCB is the General Assembly, in which each member has only one vote. Its main tasks include adopting and amending the Articles of Association, accepting the annual report and financial statements, and electing the chairman and vice-chairman of the board of directors and the auditors.

The board of directors is the governing body of the Association. It currently consists of 25 members and is composed of the 24 Chief Executive Officers of the individual cantonal banks and the chairman elected by the General Meeting for four years. Bruno Thürig has been chairman since 9 juin 2022.

The executive committee of the Board of Directors shall consist of no more than nine members. It is a narrower management body reporting to the board of directors and is responsible, among other things, for implementing the resolutions of the Annual General Meeting and the board of directors. For example, the Committee of the Board of Directors deals with issues relating to cooperation projects, sets up commissions and working groups, deals with fundamental issues of joint marketing, safeguards the interests of the Association in other organisations and vis-à-vis federal authorities and the Swiss National Bank and decides on urgent matters within the competence of the board of directors.

The office is the executive body of the Association of Swiss Cantonal Banks. It forms a link in day-to-day business both between the association and its members and between the association and the federal authorities and institutions. It also represents the Cantonal Bank Group in dealings with the media and the public.
