= List of banks in Switzerland =

== Systemically important banks ==
=== Globally systemically important banks ===
- UBS Group AG

=== Domestically systemically important banks ===
- Zurich Cantonal Bank
- Raiffeisen
- PostFinance
- Migros Bank
- Bank Cler
- UBS

== Top-tier Swiss banks ==
Other Swiss-based banks with a significant presence domestically and overseas with considerable assets under management.

- Julius Baer Group
- Vontobel
- Pictet Group
- Lombard Odier
- J. Safra Sarasin
- Union Bancaire Privée
- EFG International
- Mirabaud Group

== Family-owned Swiss banks ==
- Banque Heritage
- Bank SYZ
- ONE Swiss Bank SA
- Bordier & Cie
- Compagnie Bancaire Helvétique
- Edmond de Rothschild Group
- Rothschild Bank (Zurich)
- Geneva Swiss Bank
- Gonet & Cie
- E. Gutzwiller & Cie, Banquiers
- Habib Bank AG Zurich
- Lienhardt & Partner Privatbank Zürich
- Reichmuth & Co
- REYL Group
- Union Bancaire Privée
- Rahn+Bodmer Co.
- Vontobel
- Mirabaud Group

== Ethical banks in Switzerland ==
- Alternative Bank Switzerland

== Swiss branches of international banks ==
From 2008 to 2017 there was a reduction in the number of foreign banks in Switzerland Foreign-controlled banks Branches of foreign banks

=== Belgium ===
- AXA Bank Europe, Brüssel, Zweigniederlassung Winterthur
- Fortis Banque, SA/NV, Bruxelles, Succursale de Zurich
- STRATEO, Genève, Succursale de Keytrade Bank SA, Bruxelles, Geneva

=== Brazil ===
- Itaú Private Bank, Zürich

=== Denmark ===
- Jyske Bank (Schweiz) AG

=== France ===
- Banque du Léman SA, Geneva
- BNP Paribas (Suisse) SA, Geneva
- Crédit Agricole (Suisse) SA, Geneva
- Société Générale Private Banking (Suisse) SA, Geneva

=== Germany ===
- Deutsche Bank (Suisse) SA, Geneva

=== Israel ===
- Bank Hapoalim (Switzerland) Ltd
- Bank Leumi (Schweiz) AG, Geneva
- IDB (Swiss) Bank Ltd, Geneva
- United Mizrahi Bank (Schweiz) AG

=== Italy ===
- Intesa Sanpaolo, Geneva
- Sella Bank AG, Geneva
- UniCredit (Suisse) Bank SA, Zurich

=== Japan ===
- Mitsubishi UFJ Wealth Management Bank (Switzerland), Ltd.
- Nomura Bank (Schweiz) AG

=== Lebanon ===
- Banque Audi (Suisse) SA, Geneva
- BankMed
- BlomBank

=== Liechtenstein ===
- LGT Bank (Schweiz) AG, Basel

=== Luxembourg ===
- KBL (Switzerland) Ltd, Geneva

=== Middle East ===
- Arab Bank (Switzerland) Ltd, Geneva
- NBAD Private Bank (Suisse) SA, Geneva
- NBK Banque Privée (Suisse) SA, Geneva
- QNB Banque Privée (Suisse) SA, Geneva

=== Netherlands ===
- Credit Europe Bank (SA), Geneva
- Van Lanschot Switzerland, Zurich

=== Portugal ===
None

=== Russia ===
- Sberbank, Zurich
- VTB Capital, Zug

=== South Africa ===
- Investec Bank (Switzerland) AG

=== Spain ===
- Banco Santander (Suisse) SA, Geneva
- NCG Banco S.A., succursale de Genève, Geneva

=== United Kingdom ===
- Barclays Bank (Suisse) SA, Geneva
- Barclays Capital, Zurich Branch of Barclays Bank PLC, London
- HSBC Private Bank (Suisse) SA, Geneva
- IG Bank S.A., Geneva
- Lloyds Bank plc, Londres, succursale de Genève, Geneva

*Standard Chartered Bank (Switzerland) SA (No offices anymore in Switzerland)

=== United States ===
- Citibank, NA, Las Vegas, Succursale de Genève
- Citibank, NA, Las Vegas, Zurich Branch
- Goldman Sachs Bank AG
- JPMorgan Chase Bank, National Association, Columbus, Succursale de Zurich
- J.P. Morgan (Suisse) SA, Geneva
- Merrill Lynch Capital Markets AG
- Morgan Stanley AG
- State Street Bank GmbH, München, Zweigniederlassung Zürich

== See also ==
- Banking in Switzerland
- List of banks in Europe
- List of banks (alphabetically)
