= List of tallest structures in Switzerland =

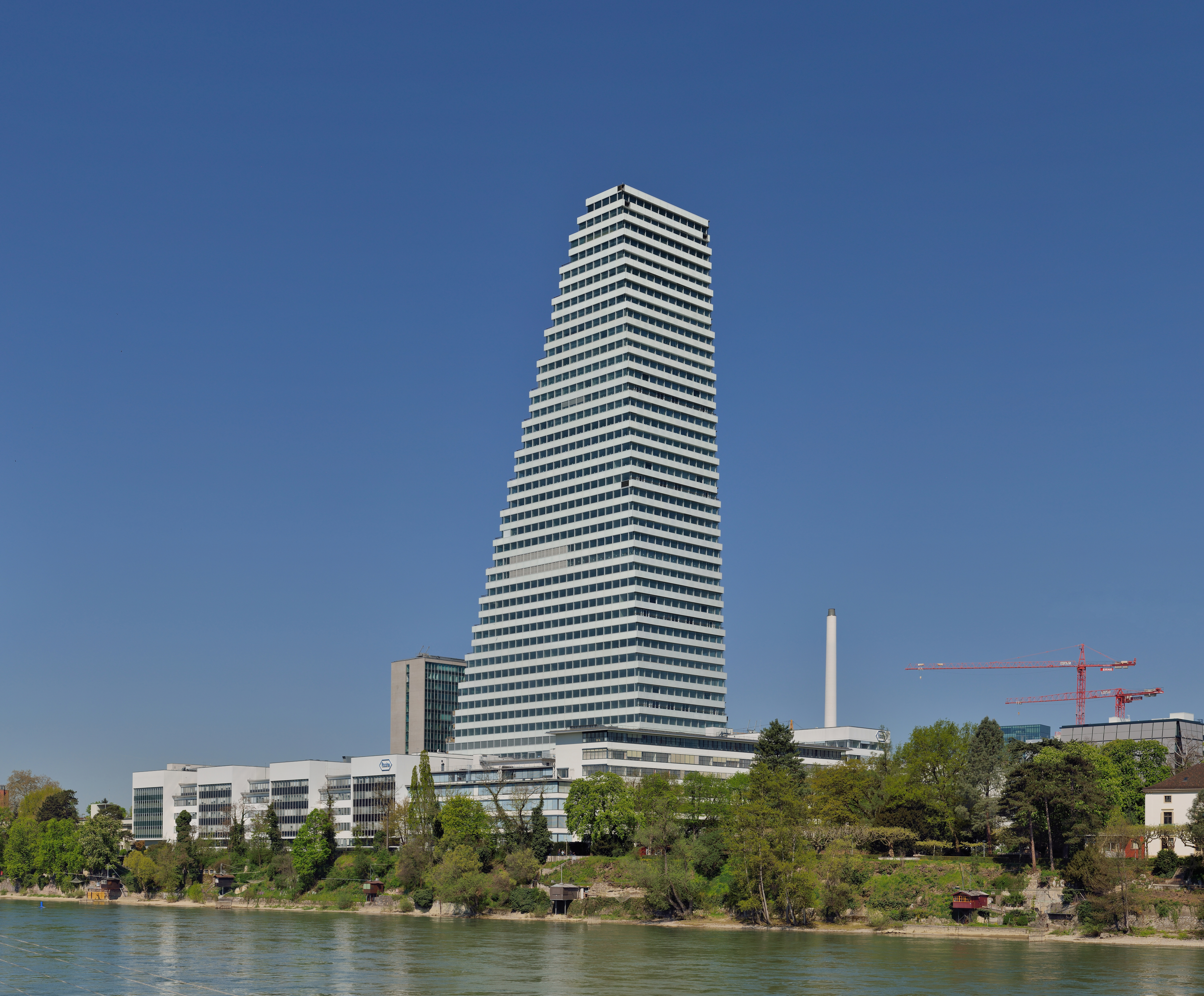
Roche Tower – Switzerland's tallest building since 2015

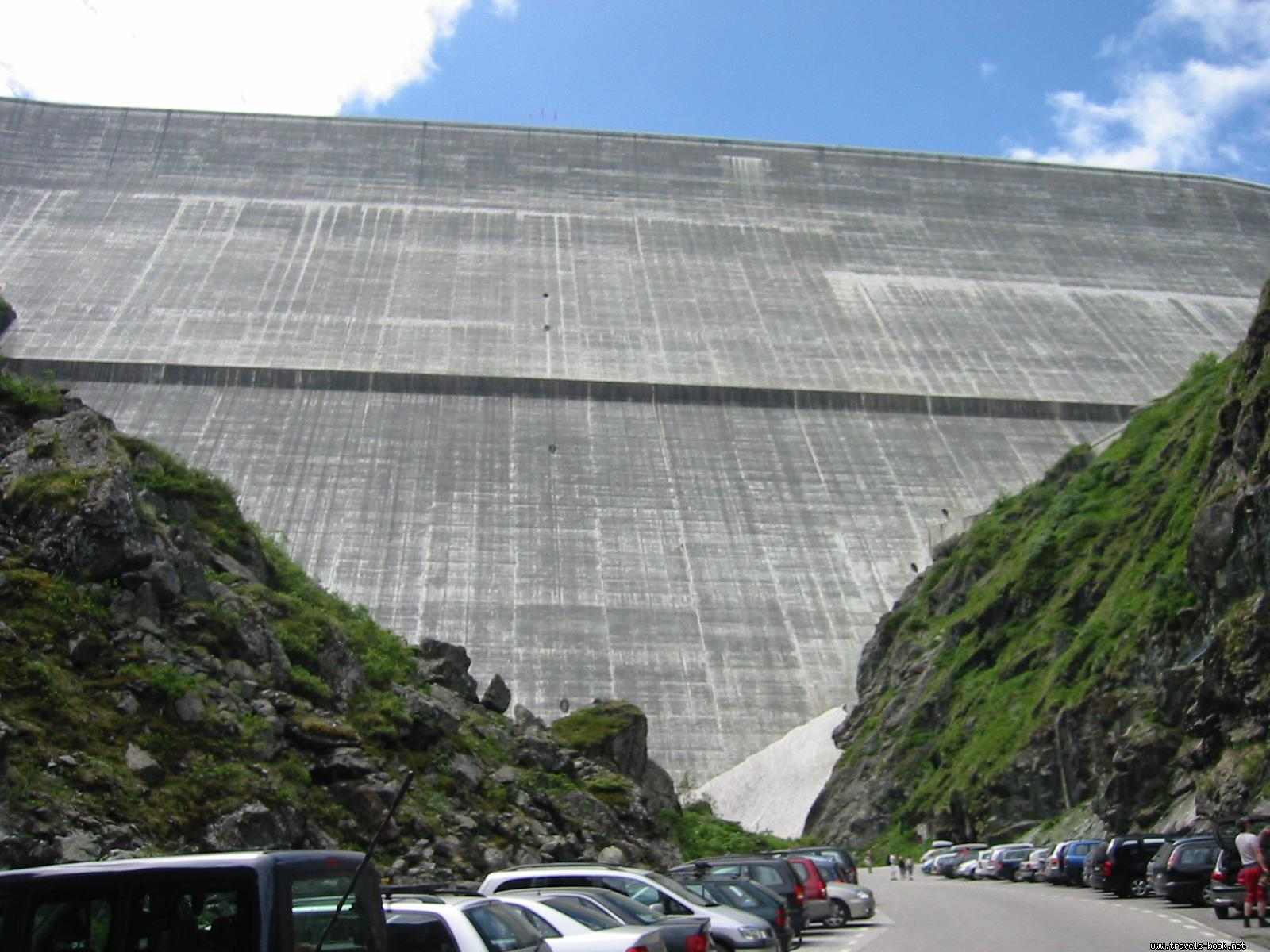
Grande Dixence Dam, 285 m

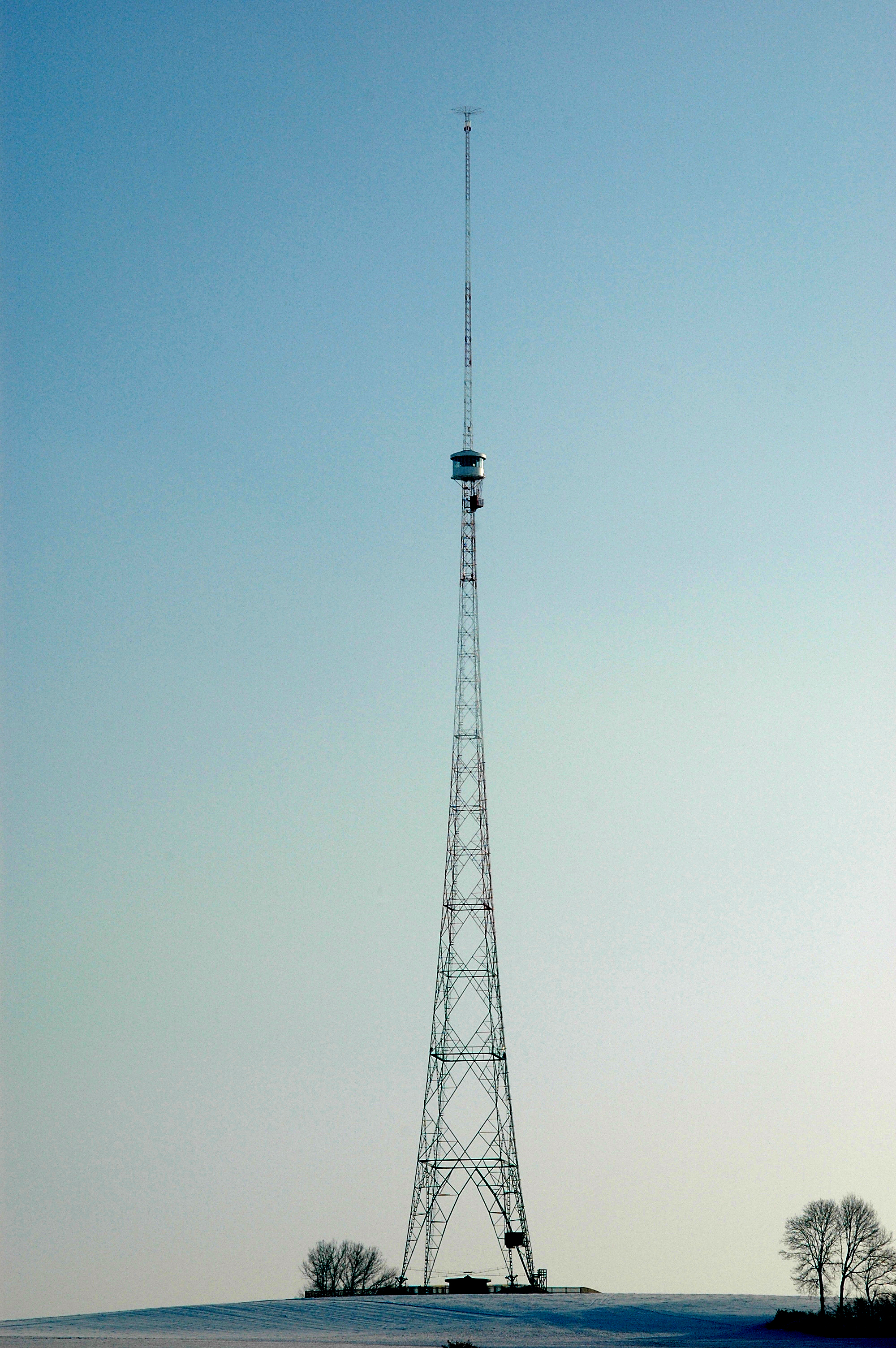
Blosenbergturm 217 m

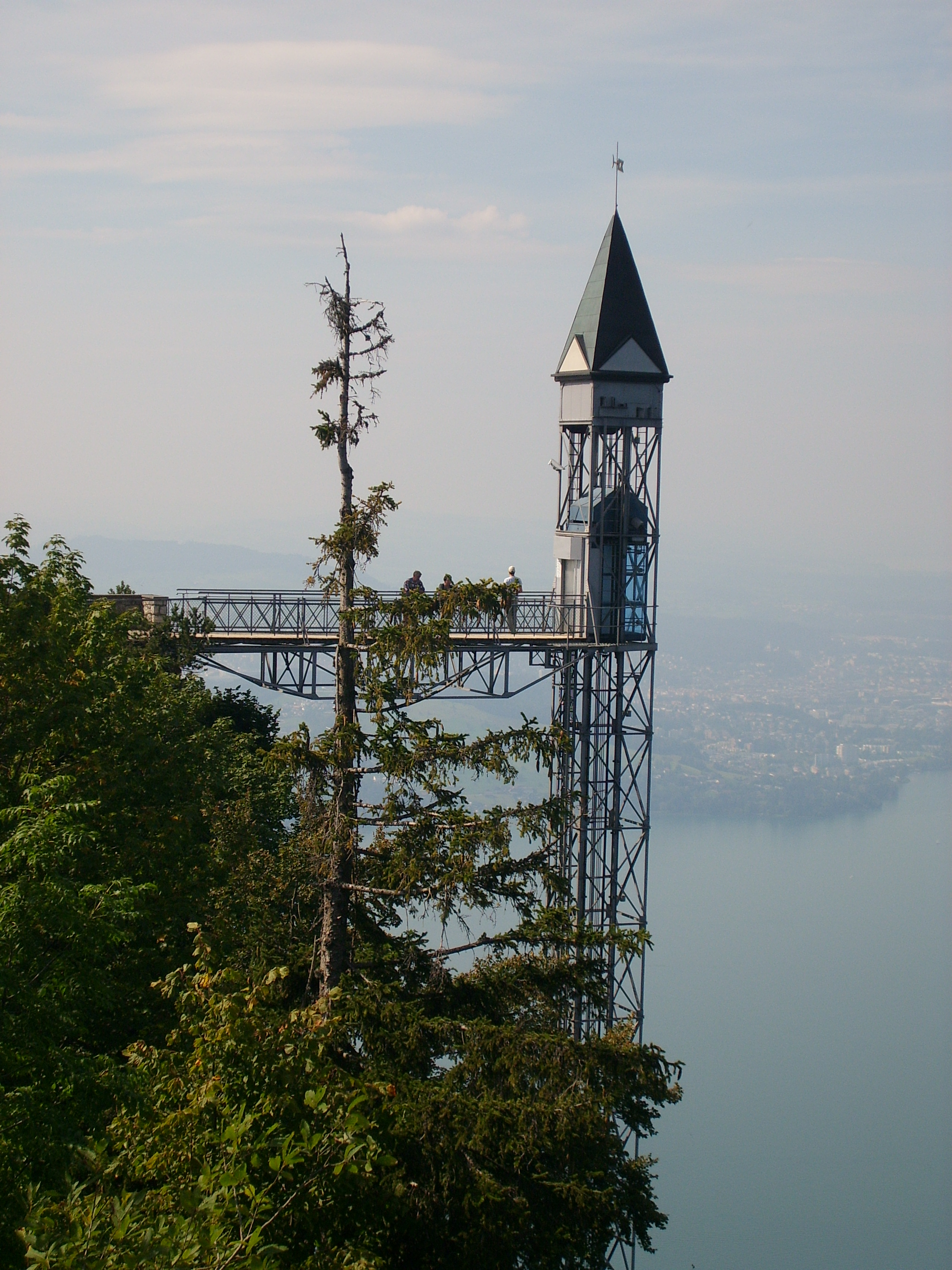
Hammetschwand Elevator, 157 m

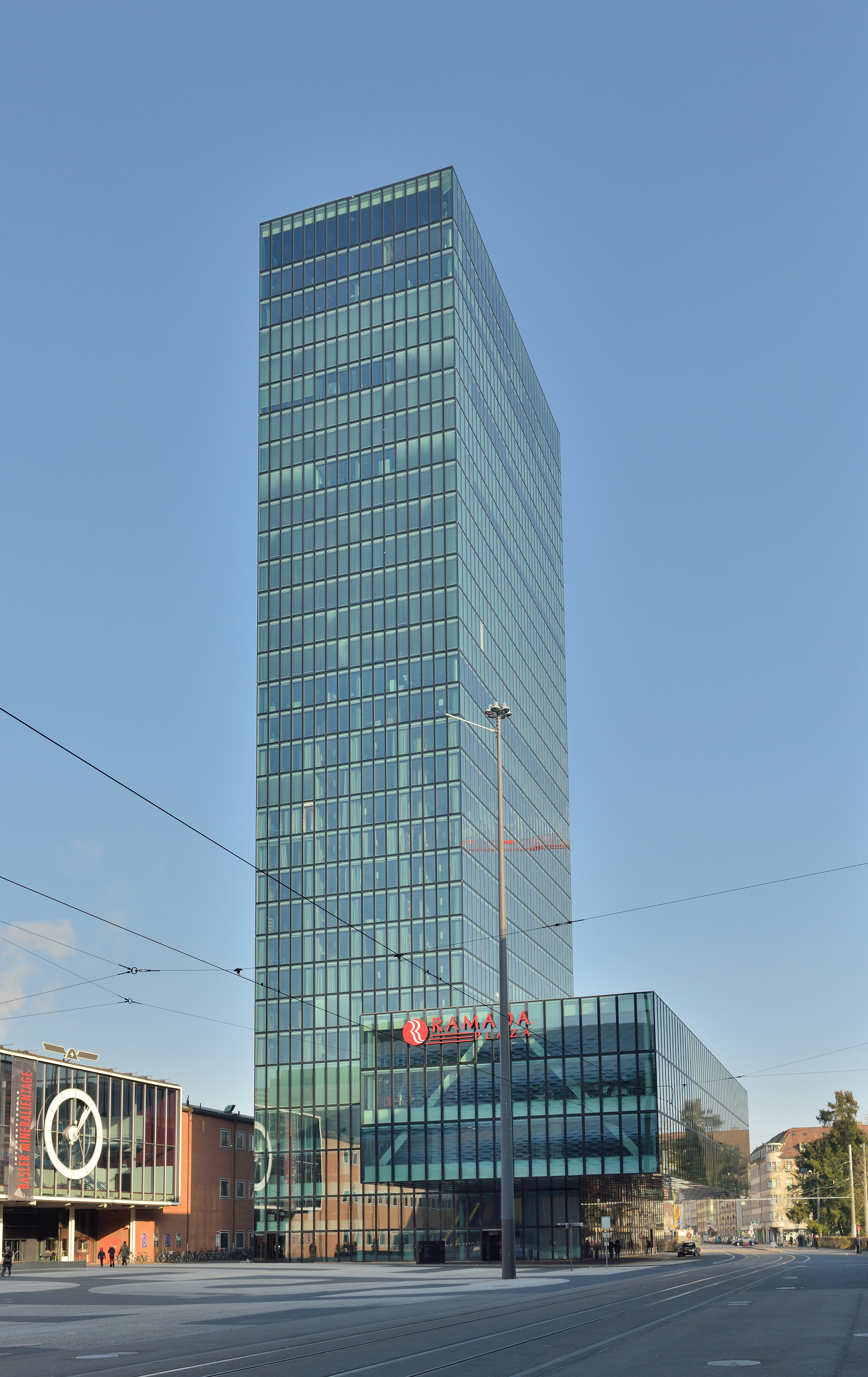
Basler Messeturm, 105 m

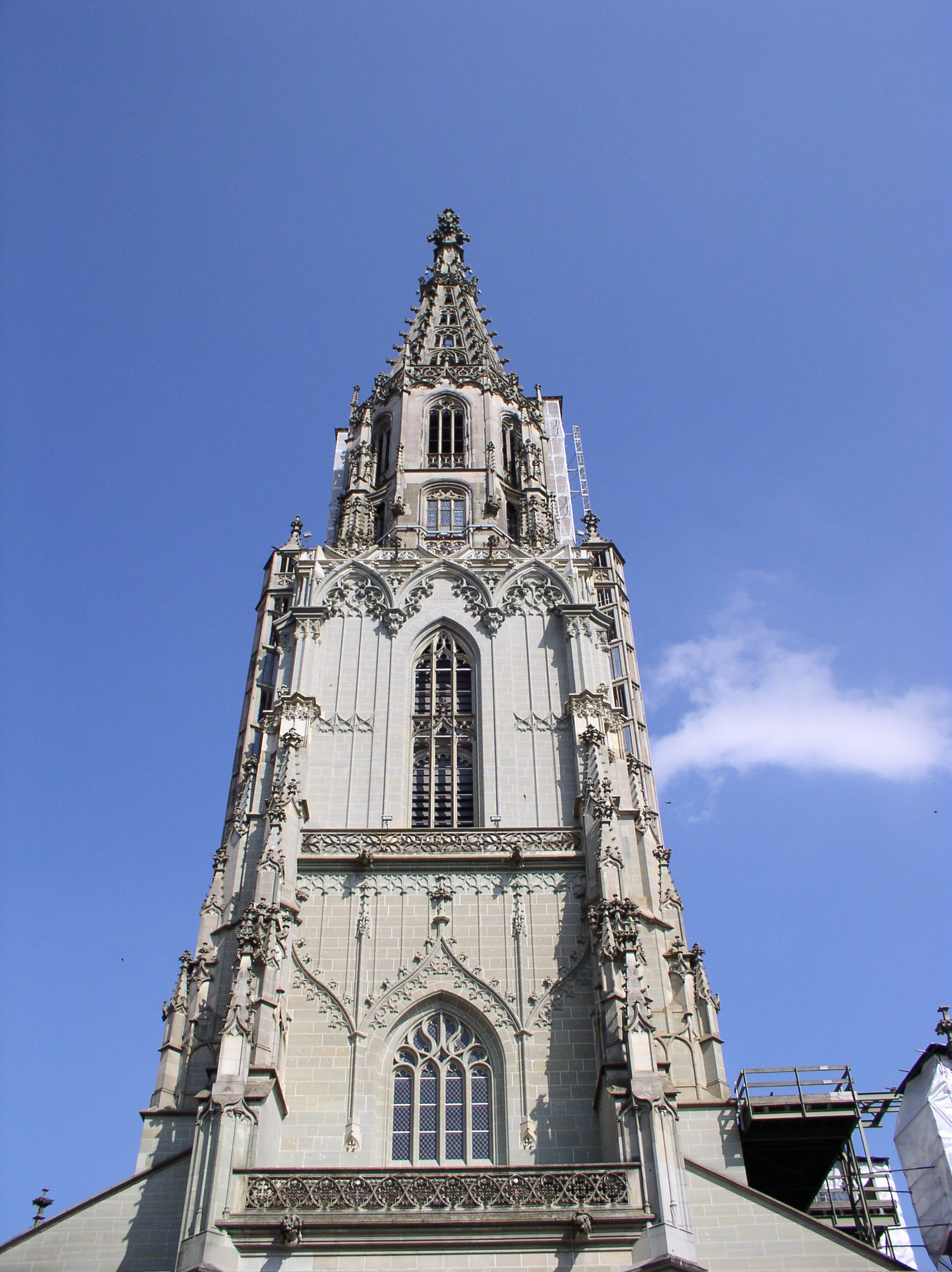
Münster of Bern, 100 m

A list of tallest structures in Switzerland. This list may be incomplete and incorrect.

indicates a structure that is no longer standing.

Construction type	year built	construction type	Location	Height	Coordinates	Remarks
Grande Dixence Dam	1965	dam	Hérémence	285 m	46°4′49.89″N 7°24′13.13″E	
Swisscom-Sendeturm St. Chrischona	1983	tower	St. Chrischona, Bettingen	250 m	47°34′18.26″N 7°41′13.16″E	
Mauvoisin Dam	1957	dam	Bagnes	250 m	45°59′52.79″N 7°20′55.17″E	
Luzzone Dam	1965	dam	Olivone	225 m	46°33′45.12″N 8°57′48.8″E	
Transmitter Monte Ceneri	1978	guyed mast	Monte Ceneri	220 m	46°8′19.11″N 8°59′25.5″E	insulated against ground, dismantled in 2016
Verzasca Dam	1965	dam	Tenero-Contra	220 m	46°11′48.05″N 8°50′53.15″E	
Blosenbergturm	1937	lattice tower	Beromünster	217 m	47°11′22.52″N 8°10′31.65″E	insulated against ground
Roche Tower 2	2021	Skyscraper	Basel	205 m		
Tamina Bridge	2017	bridge	Pfäfers	200 m	46°59′23.56″N 9°29′21.23″E	
Bantiger TV Tower	1995	concrete tower	Bolligen	196 m	46°58′40.14″N 7°31′43.2″E	
Niouc Bridge	1922	Bridge	Chandolin	190 m	46°15′47.92″N 7°33′19.59″E	
Transmitter Sottens, old transmission tower	1948		Sottens	190 m		demolished in 1989, insulated against ground
Pont de Gueuroz	1934	Bridge	Vernayaz	189 m	46°7′43.68″N 7°2′24.28″E	
Pont Neuf de Gueuroz	1994	Bridge	Vernayaz	189 m	46°07′43.97″N 7°2′24.66″E	
Sottens transmitter	1989	lattice tower	Sottens	188 m	46°39′21.74″N 6°43′44.43″E	Grounded tower with cage antenna for medium wave broadcasting
Uetliberg TV Tower	1990	concrete tower	Zürich	187 m	47°21′4.89″N 8°29′24.63″E	
Sigriswil Panorama Bridge	2012	Bridge	Sigriswil	182 m	46°43′6.68″N 7°42′25.12″E	
Emosson dam	1974	dam	Finhaut	180 m	46°4′2.9″N 6°55′54.59″E	
Roche Tower	2015	skyscraper	Basel	178 m	47°33′31.63″N 7°36′28.66″E	Tallest building in Switzerland
Haldenstein Wind Turbine	2013	Wind turbine	Haldenstein	175 m	46°53′38.48″N 9°32′18.81″E	type: V-112-3.0 MW, nacelle height: 119 metres, rotor diameter: 112 metres
Hammetschwand Elevator	1905	lattice tower	Luzern	157 m	47°0′3.31″N 8°23′46.2″E	
Tseuzier Dam	1957	dam	Crans-sur-Sierre	156 m	46°20′50.81″N 7°26′9.54″E	
Göscheneralp Dam	1960	dam	Göschenen	155 m	46°38′43.43″N 8°29′52.29″E	
Curnera Dam	1960	dam	Mompe Tujetsch	153 m	46°38′7.4″N 8°42′47.95″E	
Zervreila Dam	1958	dam	Vals	151 m	46°34′39.74″N 9°7′5.91″E	
Cooling tower of Gösgen Nuclear Power Plant	?	cooling tower	Gösgen	150 m	47°21′57.85″N 7°58′8.65″E	
Ganter Bridge	1980	Bridge	Ried-Brig	150 m	46°17′47.06″N 8°3′2.73″E	
Moiry Dam	1958	dam	Grimentz	148 m	46°8′12.99″N 7°34′14.78″E	
Peuchapatte Wind Turbines	2010	Steel tube tower	Muriaux	148 m	47°12′7.82″N 6°57′46.52″E	Wind turbines of Enercon E-82 type
Gigerwald Dam	1976	dam	Pfäfers	147 m	46°54′45.69″N 9°23′28.62″E	
Limmern Dam	1963	dam	Linthal	146 m	46°50′44.8″N 9°00′31.76″E	
Geissberg Radio Tower		lattice tower	Villigen	145 m	47°31′47.33″N 8°10′6.73″E	
Cooling tower of nuclear power plant Leibstadt	?	cooling tower	Leibstadt	144 m	47°36′6.99″N 8°11′7.01″E	
Valle di Lei Dam	1962	dam	Campsut-Cröt	141 m	46°28′54.12″N 9°27′11.4″E	
DSM-Chimney		chimney	Eiken	140 m	47°32′50.91″N 7°58′52.46″E	
Martigny Wind Turbine	2008	Steel tube tower	Martigny	140 m	46°7′36.22″N 7°3′7.74″E	Wind turbine of Enercon E-82 type
Mount Crosin, Vestas V90 Wind Turbine	2010	Steel tube tower	Mount Crosin	140 m	47°9′48.66″N 6°59′11.71″E ; 47°10′35.42″N 7°0′33.09″E ; 47°11′5.59″N 7°0′54.41″E ; 47°10′50.87″N 7°1′11.81″E ; 47°11′9.89″N 7°1′20.28″E ; 47°11′15.66″N 7°1′30.46″E ; 47°11′46.46″N 7°3′1.75″E ; 47°12′5.46″N 7°4′26.51″E	8 Wind turbines of Vestas V90 type
Farinet bridge		bridge	Saillon	136 m	46°10′59.86″N 7°10′58.78″E	
St. Chrischona, old tower	1962	lattice tower	St. Chrischona, Bettingen	136 m		
Collonges Wind Turbine	2005	Steel tube tower	Collonges	135.5 m	46°9′35.76″N 7°2′13.82″E	Wind turbine of Enercon E-70/E4 type
Transmitter Monte Ceneri	1933	Lattice tower	Monte Ceneri pass	135 m	46°8′26.24″N 8°54′56.37″E	insulated against ground, originally 120 metres tall. Since 1978 used for TV-broadcasting (today DVB-T and DAB)
Mauvernay Wind Measurement Mast	2015	guyed mast	Epalinges	135 m	46°34′13.81″N 6°41′11″E	
Sambuco Dam	1956	dam	Fusio	130 m	46°27′21.86″N 8°39′35″E	
Gall Dam	1968	dam	Zernez	130 m	46°37′23.86″N 10°11′35.89″E	
Dala Gorge Bridge	1991	bridge	Leuk	130 m	46°19′9.14″N 7°37′25.45″E	
Brühlberg Tower	1994	concrete tower	Winterthur	130 m	47°30′7″N 8°42′8.94″E	
Nalps Dam	1962	dam	Sedrun	127 m	46°38′20.32″N 8°45′41.14″E	
Transmitter Beromünster, backup transmission tower	1933	lattice tower	Beromünster	125 m	47°12′1.01″N 8°10′17.11″E	insulated against ground
Transmitter Sottens, backup transmission tower	1931	lattice tower	Sottens	125 m	46°39′21.38″N 6°44′11.04″E	Insulated against ground
Towers of HBG Prangins	1931	lattice towers	Prangins	125 m	46°24′27.02″N 6°15′7.33″E ; 46°24′33.3″N 6°15′13.08″E	2 grounded towers carrying a T-antenna for longwave, demolished in 2012
Prime Tower (formerly "Maagtower")	2011	Skyscraper	Zürich	125 m	47°23′10.15″N 8°31′2.28″E	Second tallest building in Switzerland (in future 5th tallest skyscraper in Switzerland )
Jura-Zement Factory Chimney	?	Chimney	Wildegg	125 m	47°24′50.79″N 8°9′35.46″E	
Chimney of Mühleberg Nuclear Power Plant	?	Chimney	Mühleberg	125 m	46°58′6.7″N 7°16′4.83″E	
Hongrin Dam North	1969	Dam	L'Etivaz	125 m	46°25′30.58″N 7°2′38.53″E	
Säntis transmitter	1998	concrete tower	Säntis	123,55 m	47°14′58.07″N 9°20′32.8″E	
Mont Pèlerin TV Tower	1974	concrete tower	Mont Pèlerin	122.6 m	46°29′49.37″N 6°49′8.77″E	
Chimney of Novartis AG	?	Chimney	Basel	122 m		demolished in 2005
Old Stalden Bridge	1930	Bridge	Stalden	122 m	46°13′36.84″N 7°51′49.24″E	
New Stalden Bridge	1969	Bridge	Stalden	122 m	46°13′42.69″N 7°51′51.77″E	
Gries Wind Turbine		Wind Turbine	Ulrichen	120.5 m	46°27′46.6″N 8°22′28.38″E	type: Enercon E-70, nacelle height: 85 metres, rotor diameter: 71 metres
Chimney of Holderbank AG	?	Chimney	Aargau	approximately 120 m		demolished in 1984
Gebidem Dam	1964	Dam	Naters	120 m	46°22′16.14″N 8°0′8.65″E	
Chimney of Chavalon Thermal Power Plant	1965	Chimney	Vouvry	120 m	46°20′49.98″N 6°52′40.66″E	
Mattmark	1967	Dam	Saas Almagell	120 m	46°02′56.48″N 7°57′32.53″E	
Directional Radio Tower Le Chasseral	1983	concrete tower	Nods	120 m	47°7′59.42″N 7°3′37.19″E	
Valzeina TV Tower		lattice tower	Valzeina	120 m	46°56′45.28″N 9°35′40.24″E	
St. Brais Wind Turbines	2009	Steel tube tower	St. Brais	119 m	47°18′9.84″N 7°6′2.78″E ; 47°18′13.14″N 7°6′25.57″E	2 Wind turbines of Enercon E-70/E4 type
Gibloux Radio Tower	?	concrete tower	Sorens	118.7 m	46°41′2.77″N 7°2′26.55″E	
Kornhaus Swissmill	2015	silo	Zürich	118 m	47°23′22.7″N 8°31′37.38″E	
Santa Maria Dam	1968	dam	Medels	117 m	46°35′11.97″N 8°48′2.87″E	
Albinga Dam	1959	dam	Vicosoprano	117 m	46°20′15.61″N 9°38′50.11″E	
Meteorological Mast of Leibstadt Nuclear Power Plant	1997	guyed mast	Leibstadt	115 m	47°35′50.24″N 8°11′17.07″E	
Mentue bridge	1999	bridge	Yvonand	115 m	46°46′36.46″N 6°43′31.83″E	motorway bridge
Spitallamm Dam	1932	dam	Guttannen	114 m	46°34′19.74″N 8°19′46.84″E	
Transmission Tower La Dole	1958	lattice tower	La Dole	112 m	46°25′50.28″N 6°7′33.87″E	
Innerthal Dam	1932	dam	Innerthal	112 m	47°06′22.92″N 8°54′15.35″E	
Wasserflue Radio Tower		lattice tower	Küttigen	112 m	47°25′51.66″N 8°01′13.32″E	
Cavagnoli Dam	1968	dam	Cavergno	111 m	46°27′15.39″N 8°30′27.07″E	
Engelberg Radio Tower	1974	lattice tower	Dulliken	110.6 m	47°20′8.61″N 7°56′40.94″E	
Chimneys of Basel Incineration Plant	?	Chimney	Basel	110 m	47°34′22.52″N 7°34′7.89″E ; 47°34′21.85″N 7°34′8.43″E	2 chimneys
Vaux Bridge	1999	bridge	Yvonand	110 m	46°47′2.47″N 6°44′42.77″E	motorway bridge
Swisscom Tower		Highrise	Winterthur	110 m	47°30′13.5″N 8°43′38.77″E	roof height: 90 metres
Poya Bridge	2014	bridge	Fribourg	107.65 m	46°48′47.3″N 7°09′54.53″E	
Cheneviers Waste Incineration Facility	?	Building with chimney	Aïre-la-Ville	106 m	46°11′40.81″N 6°1′57.59″E	
Chimney of Aubrugg Incineration Plant	?	Chimney	Zürich	105 m	47°24′42.66″N 8°34′24.17″E	
Basler Messeturm	2003	skyscraper	Basel	105 m	47°33′52.16″N 7°36′7.85″E	Third tallest building in Switzerland
Twin Chimney of Cheneviers Waste Incineration Facility	?	chimney	Aïre-la-Ville	103 m	46°11′47.36″N 6°1′56.16″E	
Large chimney of Basel Roche-works	1957	chimney	Basel	103 m	47°33′37.69″N 7°36′22.93″E	
Biaschina Bridge	1983	bridge	Giornico	102 m	46°25′14.63″N 8°51′28.2″E	motorway bridge
Bière Wind Measurement Mast	2012	guyed mast	Bière	102 m	46°32′26.85″N 6°21′20.59″E	
Münster of Bern	1883	cathedral	Bern	100 m	46°56′50.07″N 7°27′4.19″E	tallest church tower in Switzerland
Attisholz-Infra Work	?	Building with chimney	Riedholz	100 m	47°13′34.62″N 7°34′38.44″E	
Volta-Basel Cogeneration Facility	?	Building with chimney	Basel	100 m	47°34′12.82″N 7°34′49.58″E	
Large Chimney of Schweizerhalle Novartis-Works	?	Chimney	Muttenz	100 m	47°31′55.73″N 7°39′54.55″E	
Infrapark Cogeneration Facility	?	Building with chimney	Muttenz	100 m	47°32′7.57″N 7°39′55.55″E	
Large Chimney of Siggenthal Cement Factory	?	Chimney	Siggenthal	100 m	47°31′20.47″N 8°14′19.76″E	
Collombey Refinery, Chimney North	?	Chimney	Collombey	100 m	46°17′14.56″N 6°57′0.06″E	
Large Chimney of Collombey Refinery	?	Chimney	Collombey	100 m	46°17′8.27″N 6°57′1.82″E	
Chimney of Collombey Refinery Power Station	?	Chimney	Collombey	100 m	46°17′9.92″N 6°56′52.13″E	
Large Chimney of Cressier Refinery	?	Chimney	Cressier	100 m	47°02′31.34″N 7°02′09.38″E	
Obwalden High Bridge	1943	Bridge	Kerns	100 m	46°53′1.47″N 8°16′22.38″E	Roof-covered, wooden bridge
Oberaar Dam	1953	dam	Guttannen	100 m	46°32′54.41″N 8°16′18.35″E	
Gimmelwald Nepal Bridge	2008	Bridge	Mürren	100 m	46°32′55.86″N 7°53′38.31″E	
Trift Bridge	2009	Bridge	Gadmen	100 m	46°41′39.02″N 8°21′27.29″E	
Linthgebiet Waste Incineration Plant Chimney	?	Chimney	Niederurnen	100 m	47°8′7.25″N 9°2′24.52″E	
Sulzer Building	1962	Highrise	Winterthur	99.9 m	47°29′59.83″N 8°43′5.48″E	
Mount Crosin, Vestas V66 Wind Turbines	2004	Steel tube tower	Mount Crosin	99 m	47°9′54.2″N 6°59′15.4″E ; 47°9′35.45″N 6°58′8.29″E	2 Wind turbines of Vestas V66 type
Sitter Bridge	1910	Bridge	Sankt Gallen	99 m	47°24′2″N 9°19′31.47″E	
Chimney of Gösgen Nuclear Power Plant	?	Chimney	Gösgen	99 m	47°21′57.18″N 7°57′56.19″E	
Chimney of nuclear power plant Leibstadt	?	Chimney	Leibstadt	99 m	47°36′6.72″N 8°10′54.53″E	
Haggen Bridge	1937	Bridge	Sankt Gallen	98.6 m	47°23′59.32″N 9°20′21.73″E	
Manera Telecommunication Tower		Tower	Rivera	98 m	46°06′32.38″N 8°53′3.23″E	
Malters Sankt Martin Church	1883	Church	Malters	98 m	47°02′9.13″N 8°11′0.5″E	
Prediger Church		Church	Zürich	97 m	47°22′26.09″N 8°32′42.23″E	
Feschel transmitter	1980	Tower	Zürich	97 m	46°19′14.89″N 7°40′23.46″E	
Cholfirst Radio Tower	1973	Lattice tower	Flurlingen	96 m	47°40′51.84″N 8°38′48.47″E	Observation deck in a height of 42 metres
Bullingerstrasse 73	1978	Highrise	Zürich	95.4 m	47°22′52.4″N 8°30′36.17″E	
Ulmizberg Telecommunication Tower	1974	Lattice tower	Köniz	95 m	46°54′3.87″N 7°26′2.32″E	Observation deck in a height of 13.5 metres
Rigi TV Tower	1998	Concrete tower	Arth	95 m	47°3′23.48″N 8°29′5.35″E	Observation deck in a height of 7 metres
Chimney of Kirchberg Waste Incineration Facility	1992	chimney	Bazenheid	95 m	47°25′24.33″N 9°4′6.48″E	
Gant-Hohtälli Aerial Tramway Support Pillar	1998	Lattice tower	Zermatt	94 m	45°59′58″N 7°47′41″E	
Zürichberg Radio Tower		tower	Zürich	94 m	47°23′10.3″N 8°34′5.15″E	
Räterichsboden Dam	1950	dam	Guttannen	94 m	46°35′22.86″N 8°19′30.36″E	
Salginatobel Bridge	1930	bridge	Schiers	93 m	46°58′54.24″N 9°43′59″E	Arch bridge
Malvaglia Dam	1959	dam	Malvaglia	92 m	46°25′27.08″N 9°1′18.35″E	
Alpnach St. Maria Magdalena Church	1820	Church	Alpnach	91.17 m	46°56′27.73″N 8°16′18.88″E	
Marmorera Dam	1954	dam	Marmorera	91 m	46°30′33.82″N 9°37′55.92″E	
Cite du Lignon Large Tower	1968	highrise	Vernier	90.83 m	46°12′2.82″N 6°5′31.06″E	
Hongrin Dam South	1969	Dam	L'Etivaz	90 m	46°25′24.88″N 7°2′28.77″E	
Chimney of Josef Street Waste Incineration Facility		chimney	Zürich	90 m	47°23′12.96″N 8°31′20.61″E	
Chimney of Hagenholz Waste Incineration Facility	1991	chimney	Zürich	90 m	47°24′51.91″N 8°33′56.55″E	
Chimney of Eclépens Cement Factory		chimney	Eclépens	90 m	46°39′18.46″N 6°32′44.6″E	
Sunrise Tower	2004	highrise	Zürich	90 m	47°24′48.47″N 8°33′9.8″E	
Fégire Bridge		bridge	Châtel-St-Denis	90 m	46°30′44.93″N 6°54′27.46″E	
MZA Celerina		lattice tower	Celerina	90 m	46°30′20.34″N 9°50′27.69″E	
Sankt Gallen Waste Incineration Facility		Building with chimney	Sankt Gallen	90 m	47°24′55.9″N 9°19′56.69″E	
Mont Cornu Radio Tower		lattice tower	La Chaux-de-Fonds	90 m	47°6′22.51″N 6°51′37.67″E	
Andreas Turm	2018	Skyscraper	Zürich-Oerlikon	80 m		
Novartis Sandoz		Office Building	Basel	77 m		
Pylon in the artificial lake of Santa Maria	1949	pylon	Lake Santa Maria	75 m	46°34′21.47″N 8°47′23.79″E	
Espacité		Office Building	La Chaux-de-Fonds	60 m		
Edipresse Tower		Office Building	Lausanne	52 m		

== See also ==
- List of tallest dams in Switzerland
- List of tallest buildings
