= Béton brut =

Raw (unfinished) concrete

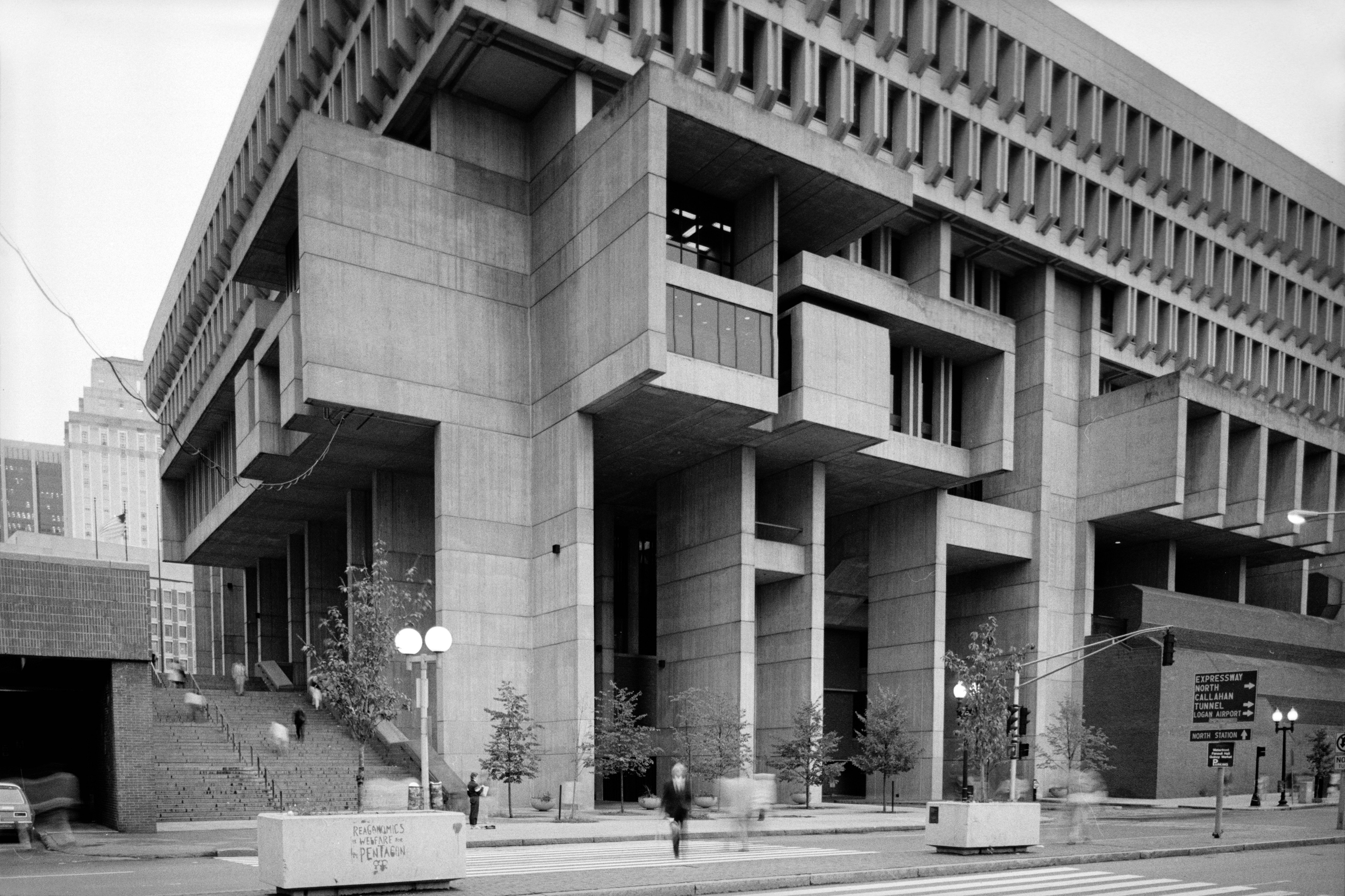
Boston City Hall (1968), an example of brutalism using béton brut

Béton brut (French pronunciation: [betɔ̃ bʁyt]) is architectural concrete that is left unfinished after being cast, displaying the patterns, textures and seams imprinted on it by the formwork. Béton brut is not a material itself, but rather a way of using concrete. The term comes from French and means "raw concrete".

== History ==
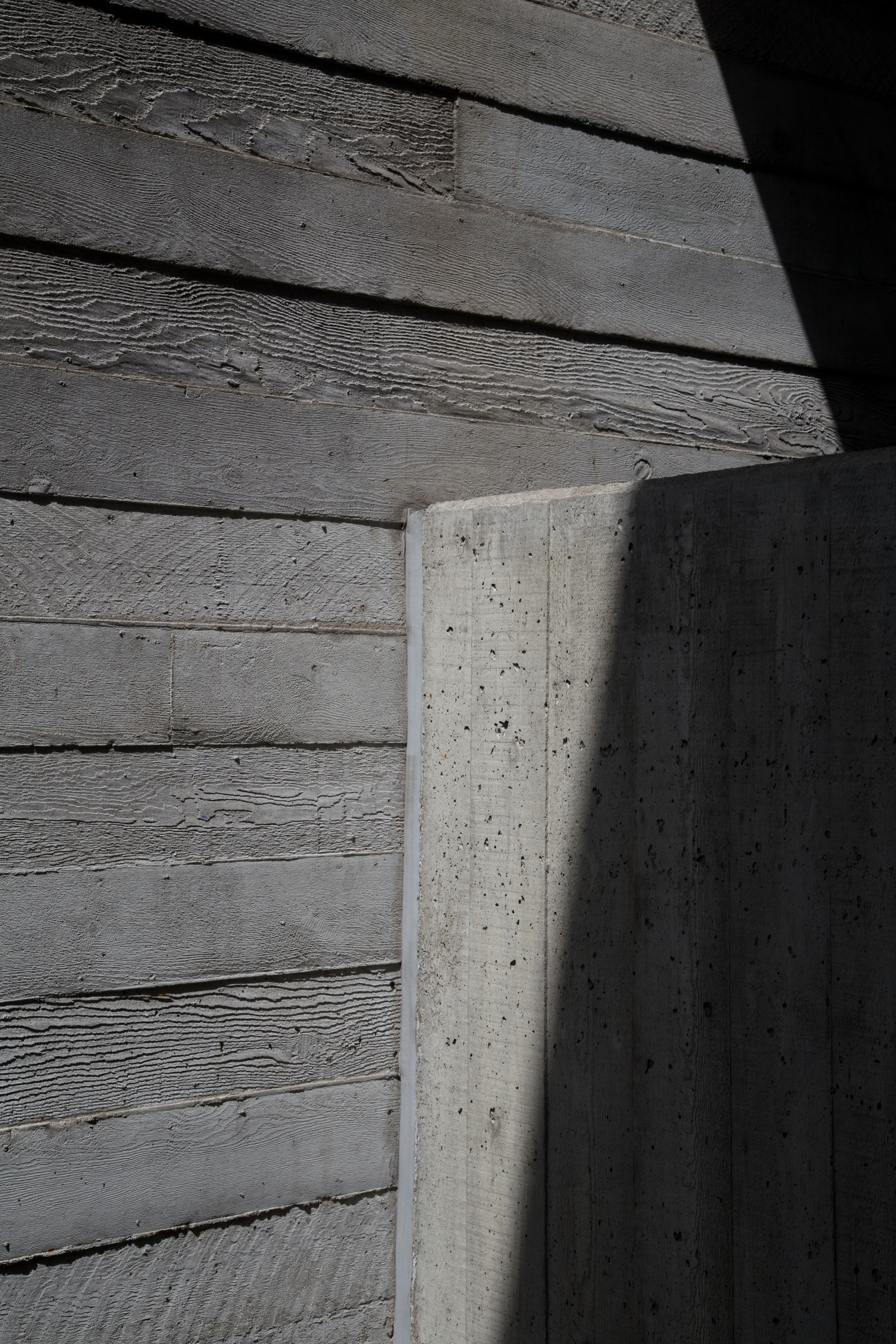
Detail of the Royal National Theatre (1976) showing the grain of the formwork

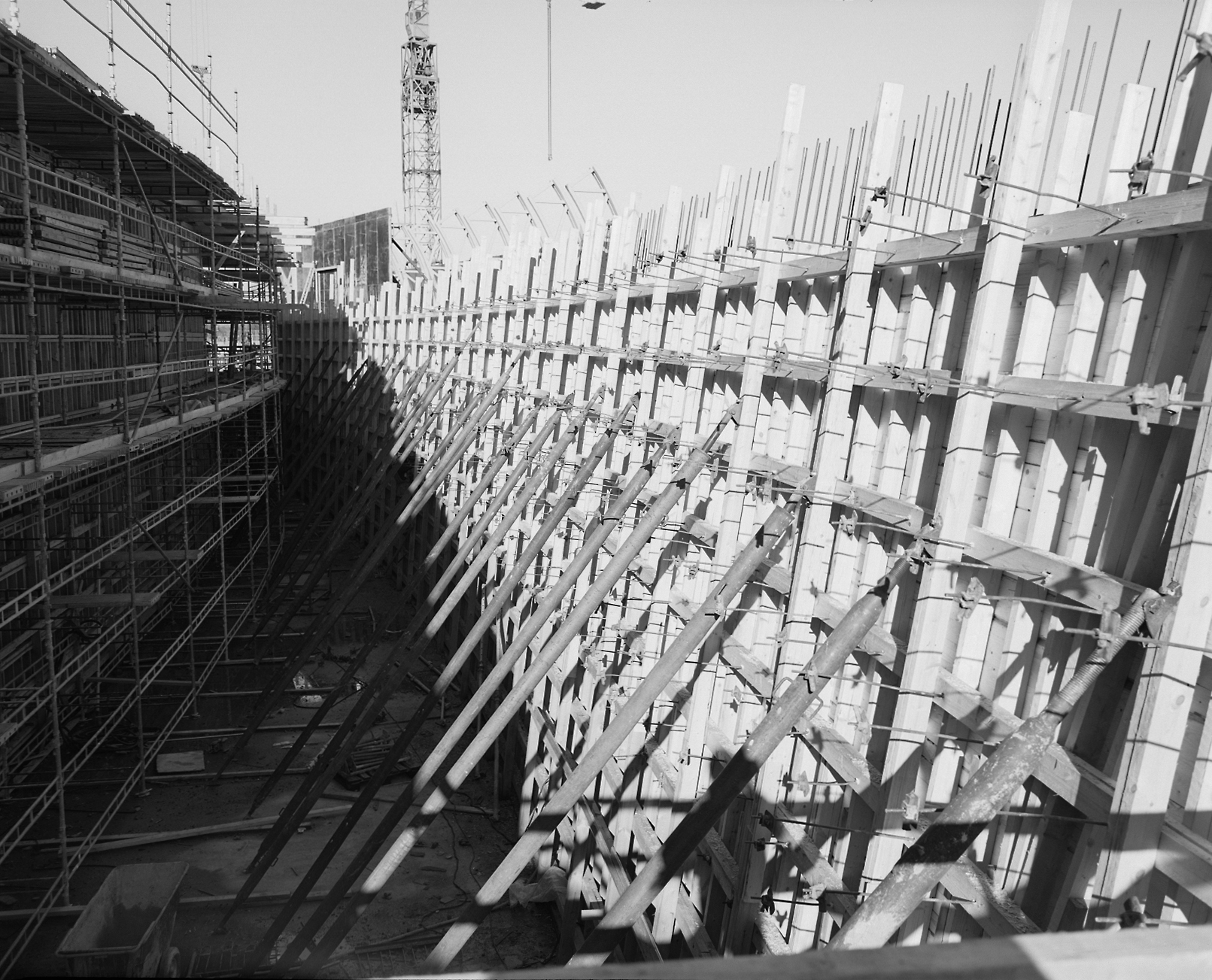
Example of large board form concrete formwork, constructed to create a complex concrete wall form with the raw concrete aesthetic of béton brut

The use of béton brut was pioneered by modernist architects such as Auguste Perret and Le Corbusier. Le Corbusier coined the term béton brut during the construction of Unité d'Habitation in Marseille, France, built in 1952. The term began to spread widely after the British architectural critic Reyner Banham associated it with Brutalism in his 1966 book, The New Brutalism: Ethic or Aesthetic?, which characterized a recent cluster of new architectural designs, particularly in Europe.

Béton brut became popular among modern architects, leading to the appreciation of the brutalist architecture style, which thrived in the 1950s–1970s. Brutalism stems from the philosophies of modern architecture that promote the truth to materials, which is achieved by their raw expression. The essence of the philosophy is seen in the imperfections of béton brut which stem from the idea of exposure of a building's components, including the frame, sheathing, and mechanical systems. The result is the visibility of the imprinted seams and construction methods of the formwork used to mold the concrete. This style of concrete is a part of structural expressionism, which emerged as steel structures became more advanced and viable.

== Fabrication ==
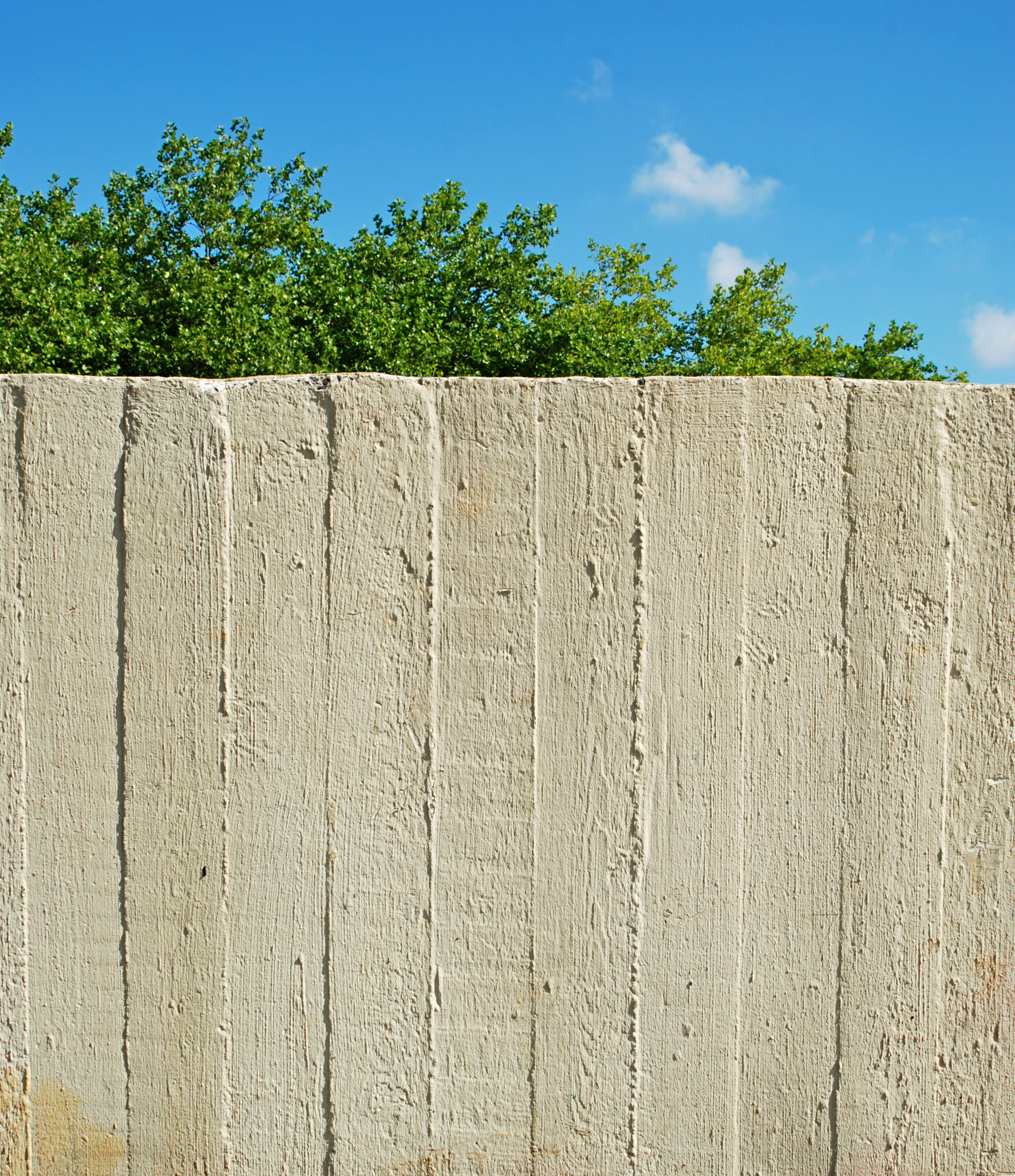
Closeup of board form concrete

After being cast, concrete will usually have a finishing treatment that smooths its surface, ridding it of any imperfections. In the case of béton brut, the concrete is left unfinished, expressing the pattern left by the formwork. Formwork is used in concrete construction as the frame for a structure in which fresh concrete is poured to then harden and take on the desired shape. Aesthetics of concrete surfaces can be varied with different formwork sheathing (e.g. board shuttering, smooth formwork, form liner, form moulds, filter fleeces). The type of material used to create the formwork (i.e. glass, wood, steel etc.) will have effects on the appearance of the final product. When Corbusier coined the term, he was specifically responding to board-marked concrete, which he used to construct many of his post-World War II buildings.

When the formwork is lined with wood it is called board form. When lumber is used to create the formwork, the concrete picks up the grain structure as it sets, resulting in a texture on the poured concrete that resembles the wood. It is important to use the same type of wood throughout the job, especially on larger buildings where the molds may get repeated uses, because the lumber can absorb moisture, which may possibly affect the color of the concrete. Other raw patterns can be created by using textured metal formwork, or having the aggregate bush or pick hammered. Wood-imprinted concrete is still popular in landscaping, especially in some western European countries.

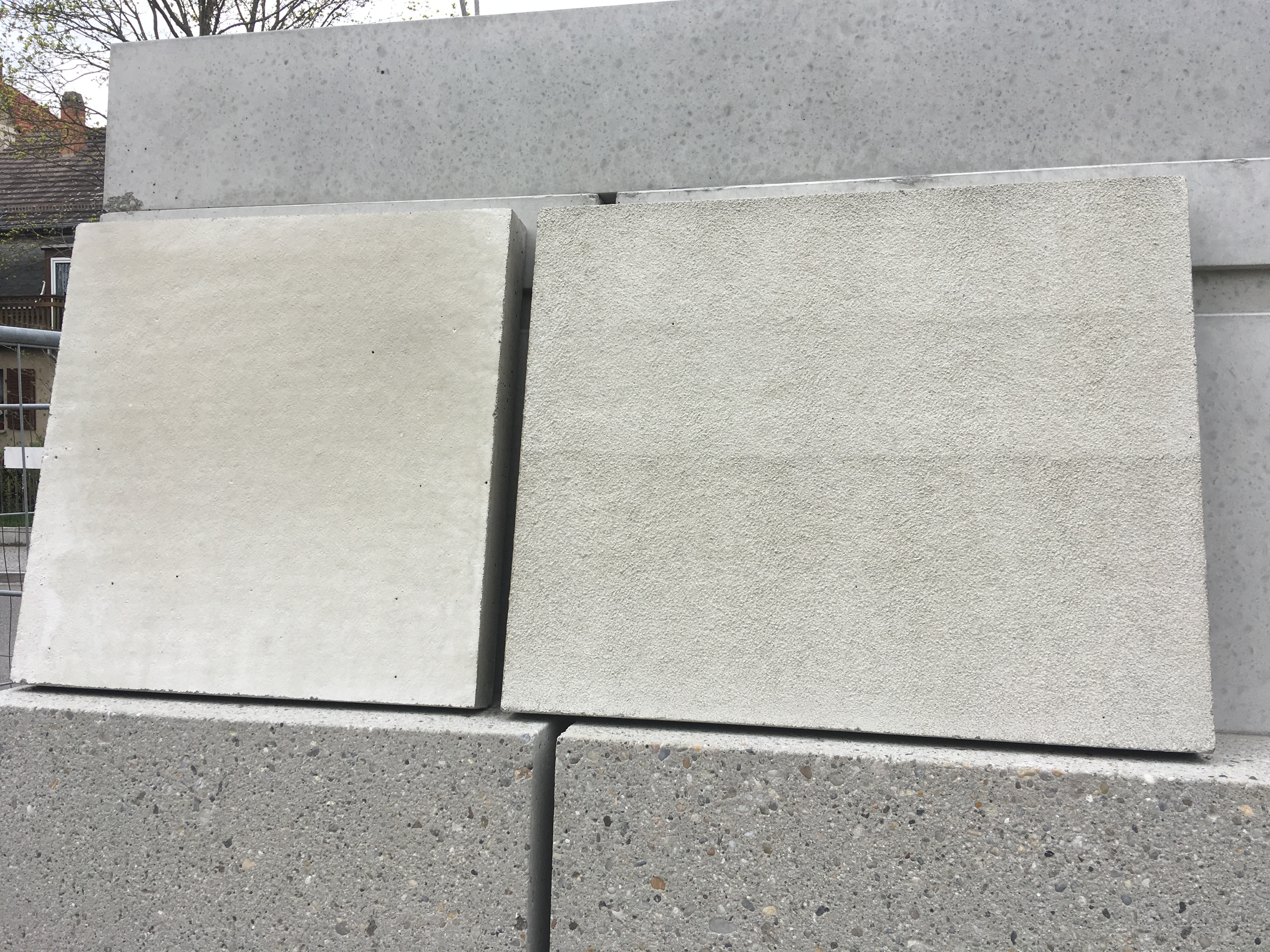
Examples of béton brut seen at the Bauhaus Museum Weimar

Surface processing techniques (e.g., washed concrete surfaces, photo concrete, acidified surfaces) can also be used to create the aesthetic of béton brut. Particularly high-quality poured concrete, achieved by leaving enough room between the formwork and the reinforcing bars for the concrete to flow freely, is called Sichtbeton in German and cemento a vista in Italian. Both terms translate roughly to "concrete for viewing".

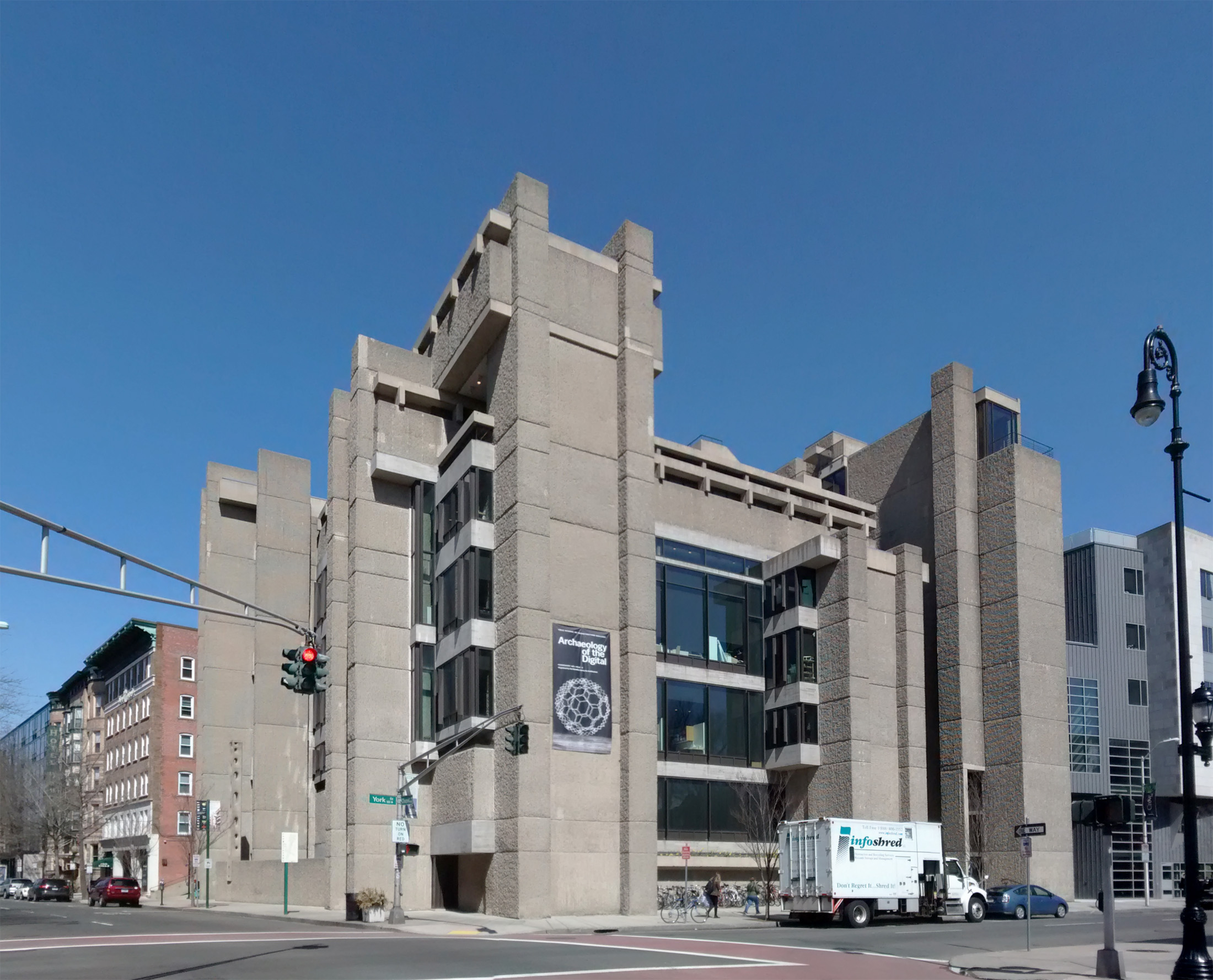
Example of béton brut used for Rudolph Hall (1963), Yale School of Architecture, in New Haven, Connecticut, US

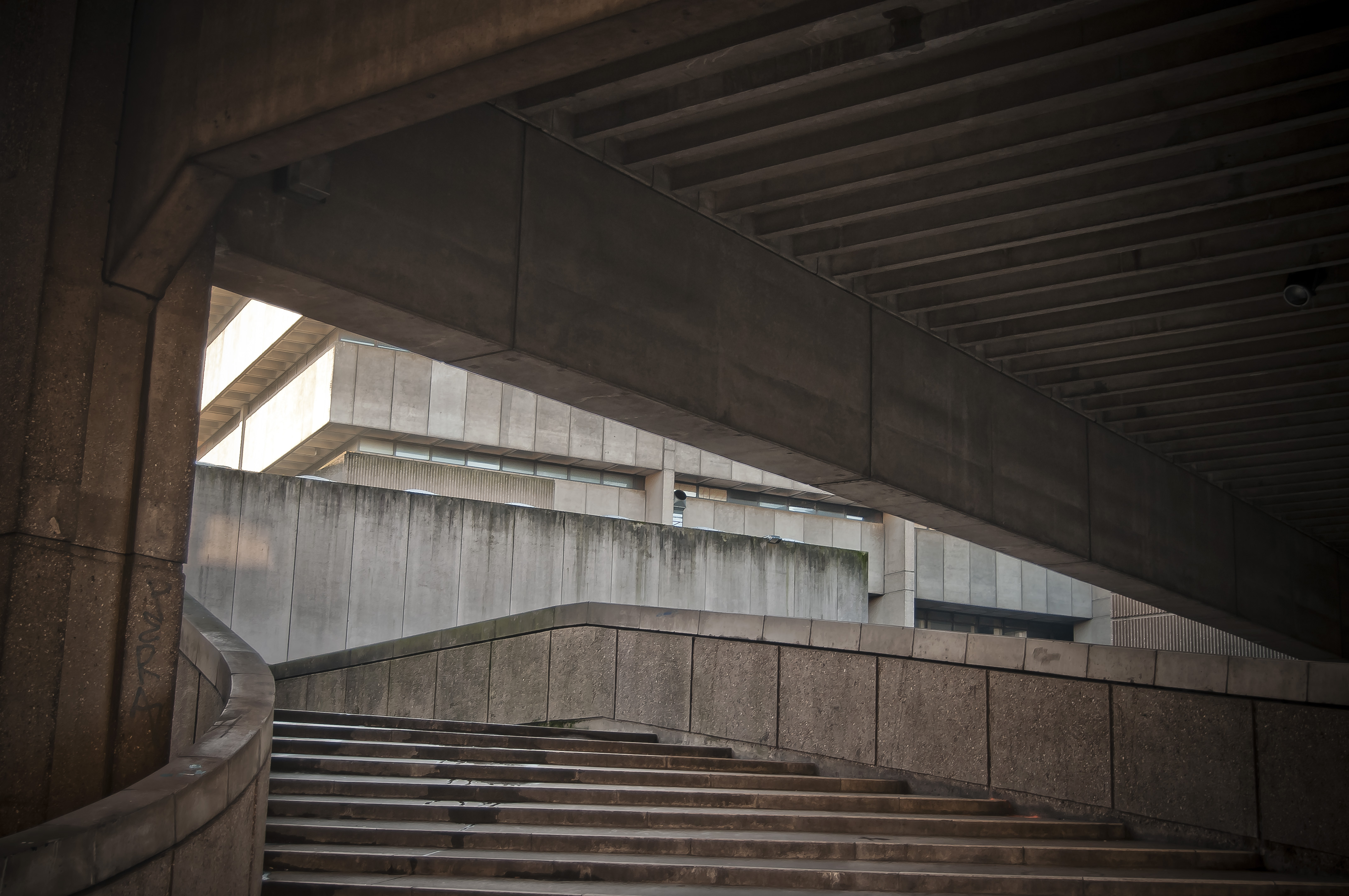
Béton brut at Paradise Place, Birmingham Central Library (1974), UK. The texture seen is representative of the formwork used to cast the concrete.

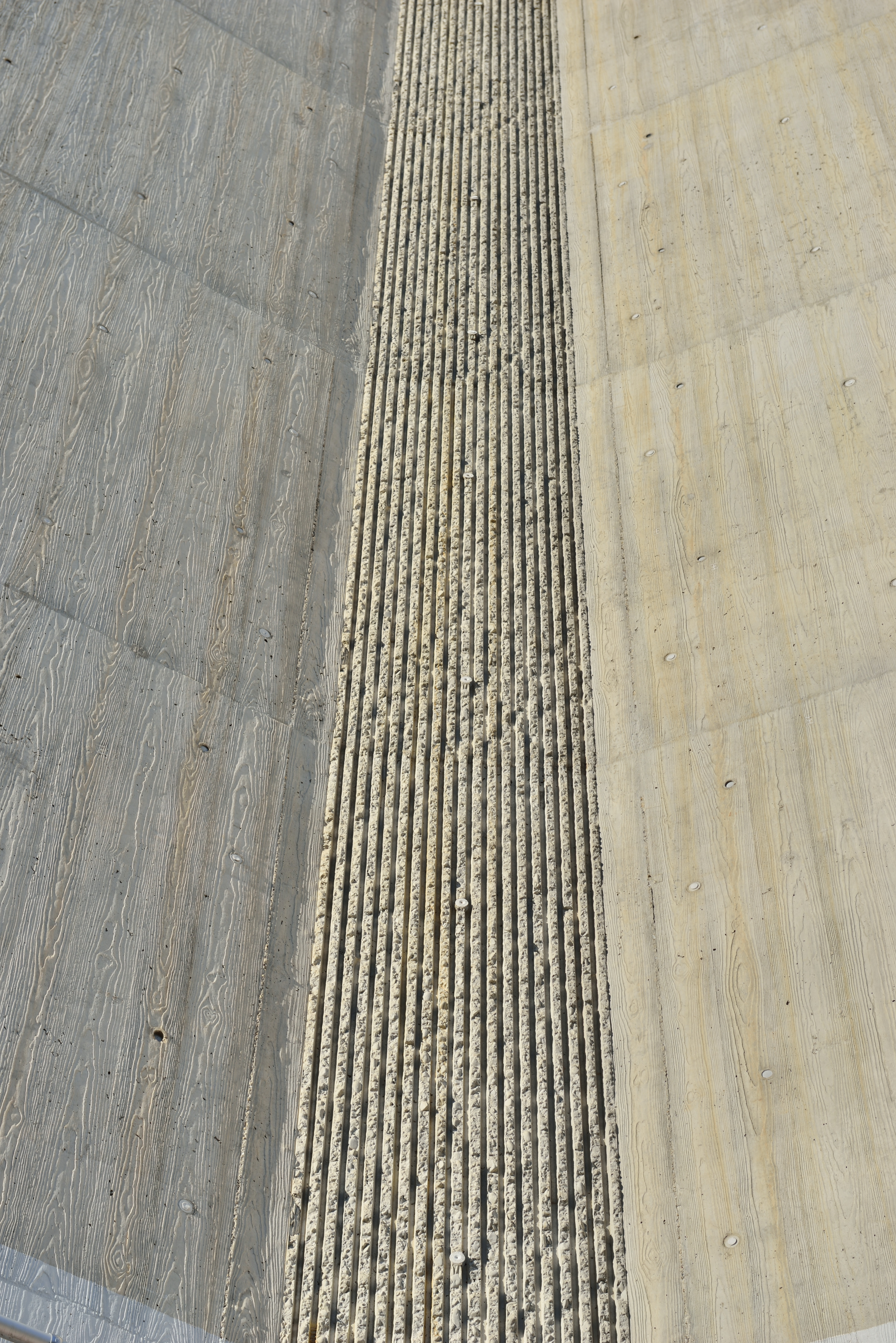
Closeup of corrugated pattern used for béton brut on the Swisscom-Sendeturm St. Chrischona television tower (1984) in Switzerland

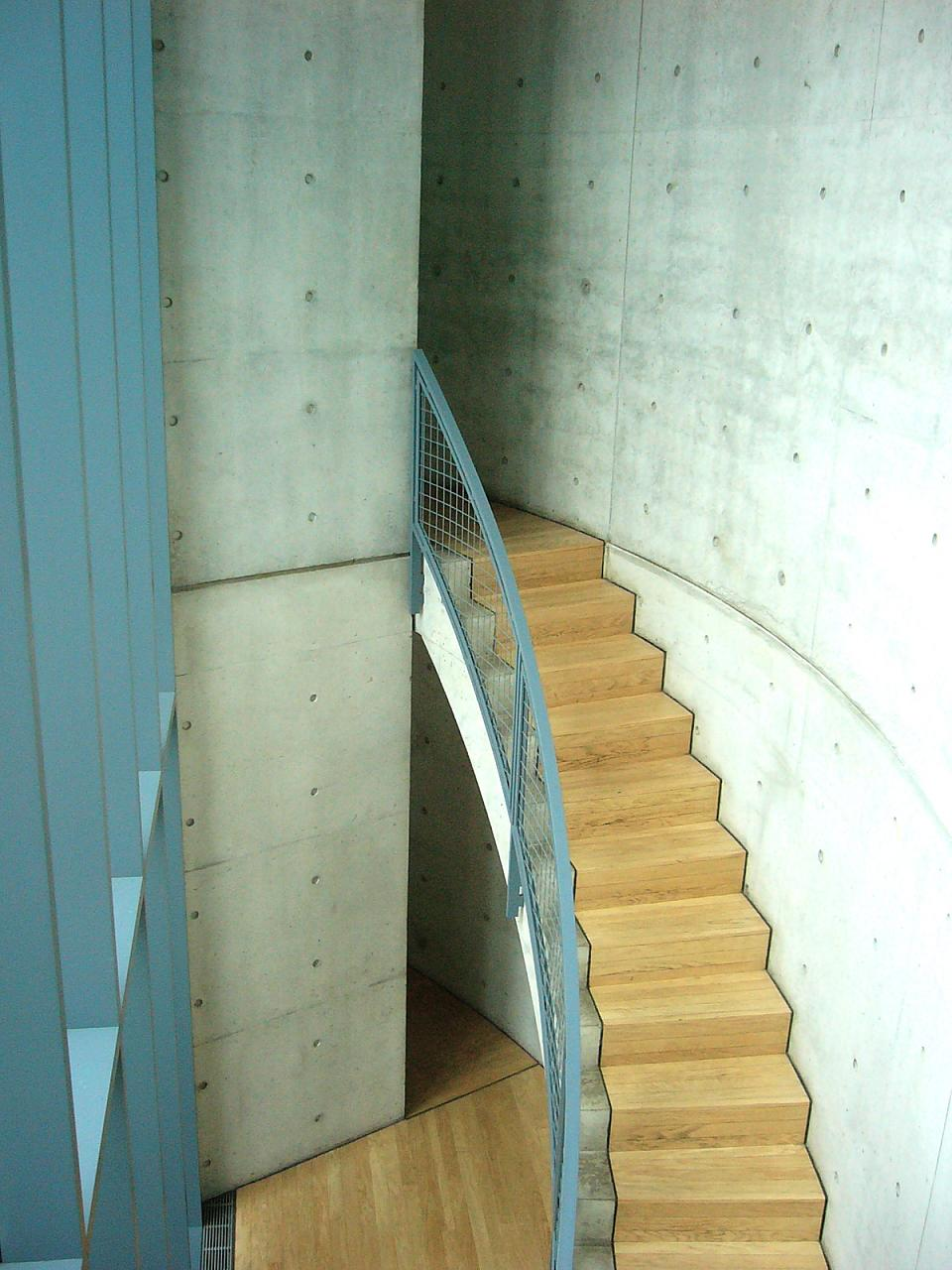
Béton brut seen on the interior of Tadao Ando's Vitra Conference Pavilion (1993) in Weil am Rhein, Germany

== Examples ==
- Church of Notre Dame du Raincy (1922–23) by Auguste Perret
- Unité d'Habitation
- Habitat 67, by Moshe Safdie, Montreal, Canada
- Reinanzaka House (1924) by Antonin Raymond
- University of Illinois at Chicago (East side of campus designed by Walter Netsch of Skidmore, Owings & Merrill)
- The Evergreen State College
- Rudolph Hall, The Yale School of Architecture, Yale University, New Haven, CT
- Sainte-Bernadette-du-Banlay church, Nevers, France, architect Claude Parent
- Boston City Hall, Boston, MA
- Royal National Theatre, London
- Tunku Canselor at University of Malaya
- the Main Entrance to the War Memorial Complex, Brest Fortress
- the Ilinden Memorial in North Macedonia
- University of Massachusetts Dartmouth (Designed by Paul Rudolph)

== See also ==
- Brutalist architecture
- Truth to materials
