= Vechigen =

Municipality in Bern, Switzerland

- Municipality
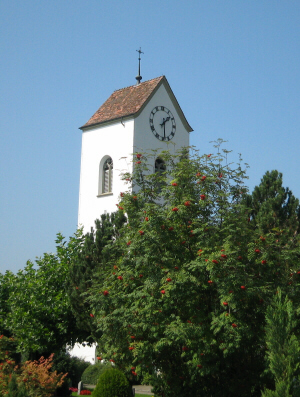

- Flag Coat of arms
- Location of Vechigen
- Location within Switzerland Location within Canton of Bern
- Coordinates: 46°57′N 7°34′E
- Country: Switzerland
- Canton: Bern
- District: Bern-Mittelland

Government
  - Executive: Gemeinderat with FDP/PLR members
  - Mayor: Gemeindepräsident(in); Nadia Lützelschwab (as of 2026)

Area
  - Total: 25 km^{2} (9.7 sq mi)
- Elevation: 583 m (1,913 ft)

Population (December 2020)
  - Total: 5,512
  - Density: 220/km^{2} (570/sq mi)
- Time zone: UTC+01:00 (CET)
  - Summer (DST): UTC+02:00 (CEST)
- Postal code: 3067
- SFOS number: 359
- ISO 3166 code: CH-BE
- Localities: Boll, Lindental, Sinneringen, Utzigen, Vechigen
- Surrounded by: Bolligen, Hasle bei Burgdorf, Krauchthal, Muri bei Bern, Oberburg, Stettlen, Walkringen, Worb
- Website: www.vechigen.ch

Vechigen is a municipality in the Bern-Mittelland administrative district in the canton of Bern, Switzerland. Until the administrative centralization of 1966, it was composed of four semi-autonomous communities: Vechigen, Sinneringen with Boll and Dentenberg, Utzigen with Lindental, and Berg with Littewil and Radelfingen.

== History ==
Vechigen was first mentioned in 1275 as Vechingen. Sinneringen was first mentioned between 1261 and 1263 as Sineringen. Utzigen was referred to as Uzingen in 1275.

=== Vechigen ===
The Vechigen valley and surrounding hills originally belonged to the Baron of Belp-Montenach. However, in 1298, they lost their land to the growing city of Bern. From then on, Vechigen was one of the four outer parishes of Bern, and until 1798, residents of the village were also citizens of the city.

The village church of St. Martin was first mentioned in 1275. It was rebuilt in 1513-14, and the bell tower dates from 1486.

In 1834, the municipality of Vechigen was formed with four quarters: Vechigen, Sinneringen with Boll and Dentenberg, Utzigen with Lindental, and Berg with Littewil and Radelfingen. Each quarter was responsible for local administration, including schooling and road construction, while the municipality handled taxation and finance. In 1913, the Worblentalbahn opened a rail station in Boll-Utzigen. By 1950, the Bern agglomeration had expanded along the railway line, and the villages of Boll and Sinneringen became part of the agglomeration area. The population of these two villages grew rapidly, while that of the rest of the municipality either declined or remained stable. As the quarters transitioned from agricultural to residential areas, the decentralized government became inefficient, leading to its centralization into a single government in 1966. In 1961, a secondary school was built in the municipality, and there are now a total of five school buildings.

=== Sinneringen and Boll ===
Until 1966, the Sinneringen quarter included Sinneringen itself, the hamlets of Boll and Dentenberg, as well as farmhouses in the Worblen Valley and on Dentenberg Mountain. On the hillside above the Worblen, several Hallstatt graves were discovered, and a Roman villa was found at Hubel. During the 13th century, the Counts of Kyburg were the vogts of the village. In 1729, Hans Rudolf von Diesbach built his country estate, the Schlössli, in Sinneringen. In 1844, the artist August von Bonstetten expanded the manor house and added a clock tower.

By the 1950s, Sinneringen had become part of the Bern agglomeration, leading to a rapid population increase. By 2005, more than half of Vechigen's population lived in Sinneringen and Boll.

Boll developed from shops and inns located at the intersection of the Bern-Krauchthal and Worb-Zollikofen roads. In the 18th and 19th centuries, it consisted of a customs station, an inn, a smithy, a sawmill, and a few houses. During the 19th and 20th centuries, nearby rivers were redirected, and local swamps were drained, opening up new land around Boll for housing and farming. Despite 19th-century road construction and the completion of the Worblentalbahn rail station at Utzigen-Boll in 1913, Boll remained a small village. However, during the 1960s, the outskirts of Bern reached Boll, leading to rapid expansion. Today, the majority of Boll’s residents commute to Bern for work.

=== Utzigen ===
The Utzigen quarter included the village of Utzigen, the hamlets of Wuhl, Birchi, and Lindental, as well as 50 houses situated on a hillside above the Worblental. Utzigen originated from a late medieval herrschaft. Beginning in the 14th century, it was owned by several Bernese patrician families and was administered from Utzigen Castle. In 1669, Samuel Jenner (1624–1699) built a new castle on the site of the earlier building. After the 1798 French invasion, the herrschaft was dissolved. The Dachselhofer family, who owned the estate in 1798, lost their rights to hold the low court over the herrschaft but retained the castle and other property. The castle served as the family's summer residence until 1875, when it was sold to the municipality. The municipality then established an institute for alcoholics and unemployed men and women. At its peak, the institute housed over 500 people who worked on the large farm attached to the estate. In 1964, the castle was converted into a nursing and retirement home, and in 2001, it became a residential care home. The village also has a primary school.

== Geography ==
Aerial view by Walter Mittelholzer (1925)

It is located about 10 km (6.2 mi) east of the city of Bern. The small town is situated away from the main roads of the region and is considered one of the more picturesque towns in the area. The highest point in the municipality is the Schönbrunnenchnubel at 956 m (3,136 ft), while the lowest point is the Worble at 550 m (1,800 ft). Notably, Bern Airport is near this town.

Vechigen covers an area of 24.82 km^{2} (9.58 sq mi). Of this, 15.08 km^{2} (5.82 mi^{2}), or 60.7%, is used for agricultural purposes, while 7.55 km^{2} (2.92 mi^{2}), or 30.4%, is forested. The remaining land includes 2.12 km^{2} (0.82 mi^{2}), or 8.5%, that is settled with buildings or roads, and 0.06 km^{2} (15 acres), or 0.2%, that is covered by rivers or lakes.

In the built-up area, housing and buildings occupy 5.6%, while transportation infrastructure accounts for 2.6%. Of the forested land, 29.2% of the total area is densely forested, and 1.2% is covered with orchards or small clusters of trees. Agricultural land is used as follows: 35.6% for growing crops, 23.1% for pastures, and 2.0% for orchards or vine crops. All the water in the municipality consists of flowing water.

The municipality is located in the upper Worblental (Worblen valley). It consists of the villages of Vechigen, Sinneringen, and Boll in the valley; Utzigen on the mountain slopes; and a number of scattered hamlets and farmhouses, including Lindental, Littewil, Radelfingen, and Dentenberg.

On 31 December 2009, the municipality's former district, Amtsbezirk Bern, was dissolved. The following day, 1 January 2010, it became part of the newly created Verwaltungskreis Bern-Mittelland.

== Coat of arms ==
The blazon of the municipal coat of arms is Gules, a Wing Argent.

== Demographics ==
As of December 2020, Vechigen had a population of 5,512, with 6.8% being resident foreign nationals as of 2010. Between 2000 and 2010, the population grew by 4.4%, with migration contributing 3.8% and natural population change (births and deaths) accounting for 0.6%.

As of 2010, children and teenagers (0–19 years old) made up 21.2% of the population, adults (20–64 years old) comprised 59.1%, and seniors (over 64 years old) accounted for 19.7%.

As of 2008, the population was 49.1% male and 50.9% female. It included 2,091 Swiss men (45.4% of the population) and 170 non-Swiss men (3.7%). There were 2,205 Swiss women (47.9%) and 142 non-Swiss women (3.1%). Of the population, 1,287 people (27.9%) were born in Vechigen and lived there in 2000. Additionally, 2,105 people (45.6%) were born in the same canton, 692 people (15.0%) were born elsewhere in Switzerland, and 359 people (7.8%) were born outside of Switzerland.

As of 2000, most of the population speaks German as their first language (4,415 or 95.7%). French is the second most common language (42 or 0.9%), followed by English (40 or 0.9%). Additionally, there are 21 Italian speakers and 1 Romansh speaker.

As of 2000, there were 1,830 people who were single and never married in the municipality. Additionally, there were 2,330 married individuals, 265 widows or widowers, and 189 divorced individuals.

As of 2000, there were 466 households consisting of only one person and 118 households with five or more people. In 2000, a total of 1,721 apartments (89.7% of the total) were permanently occupied, while 164 apartments (8.6%) were seasonally occupied and 33 apartments (1.7%) were empty. As of 2010, the construction rate of new housing units was 13.9 new units per 1,000 residents. The vacancy rate for the municipality in 2011 was 0.27%.

The historical population is shown in the following chart:

== Sights ==
The entire hamlet of Lindental is designated as part of the Inventory of Swiss Heritage Sites.

== Politics ==
In the 2011 federal election, the most popular party was the SVP, which received 29.5% of the vote. The next three most popular parties were the BDP Party (17.3%), the SPS (16.6%), and the FDP (9.8%). In total, 2,237 votes were cast, and the voter turnout was 62.0%.

== Economy ==
As of 2011, Vechigen had an unemployment rate of 1.01%. As of 2008, there were a total of 1,159 people employed in the municipality. Of these, 299 people were employed in the primary economic sector, with about 105 businesses involved in this sector. The secondary sector employed 166 people, with 37 businesses operating in this sector. The tertiary sector employed 694 people, with 94 businesses in this sector.

In 2008, there were a total of 837 full-time equivalent jobs. The primary sector accounted for 178 jobs, with 176 in agriculture and 2 in forestry or lumber production. The secondary sector had 148 jobs, including 51 (34.5%) in manufacturing and 90 (60.8%) in construction. The tertiary sector had 511 jobs, distributed as follows: 85 (16.6%) in wholesale or retail sales or the repair of motor vehicles, 11 (2.2%) in the movement and storage of goods, 36 (7.0%) in hotels or restaurants, 6 (1.2%) in the information industry, 43 (8.4%) as technical professionals or scientists, 74 (14.5%) in education, and 190 (37.2%) in health care.

In 2000, there were 402 workers who commuted into the municipality and 1,654 who commuted away. The municipality is a net exporter of workers, with approximately 4.1 workers leaving for every one entering. Of the working population, 27.1% used public transportation to get to work, while 48.5% used a private car.

== Religion ==
From the 2000 census, 476 residents, or 10.3% of the population, were Roman Catholic, while 3,446 people, or 74.7%, belonged to the Swiss Reformed Church. The remaining population included 19 members of an Orthodox church (about 0.41%), 3 individuals (about 0.07%) who belonged to the Christian Catholic Church, and 265 people (about 5.74%) who were members of other Christian churches. There was 1 Jewish individual, 45 people (about 0.98%) who were Islamic, 5 individuals who were Buddhist, 27 who were Hindu, and 5 who belonged to another church. Additionally, 306 people (about 6.63%) had no religious affiliation, identified as agnostic or atheist, and 143 individuals (about 3.10%) did not answer the question.

== Education ==
In Vechigen, about 1,832 residents, or 39.7% of the population, have completed non-mandatory upper secondary education, and 817 people, or 17.7%, have completed higher education (either at a university or a Fachhochschule). Of those 817 who completed tertiary education, 70.3% were Swiss men, 22.9% were Swiss women, 4.4% were non-Swiss men, and 2.4% were non-Swiss women.

The Canton of Bern's school system provides one year of non-compulsory kindergarten, followed by six years of primary school. This is followed by three years of compulsory lower secondary school, where students are grouped according to their ability and aptitude. After completing lower secondary school, students may either pursue further education or enter an apprenticeship.

During the 2009-10 school year, a total of 482 students attended classes in Vechigen. The municipality had four kindergarten classes with a total of 62 students. Among the kindergarten students, 4.8% were permanent or temporary residents of Switzerland (non-citizens), and 3.2% had a mother tongue different from the language of instruction. The primary level consisted of 16 classes with 296 students, of whom 6.1% were permanent or temporary residents of Switzerland (non-citizens). At the lower secondary level, there were eight classes with a total of 124 students, 7.3% of whom were permanent or temporary residents of Switzerland (non-citizens), and 2.4% had a mother tongue different from the classroom language.

As of 2000, there were 19 students in Vechigen who came from other municipalities, while 209 residents of Vechigen attended schools outside the municipality.
