= Bantiger TV Tower =

Transmission tower in Bern, Switzerland

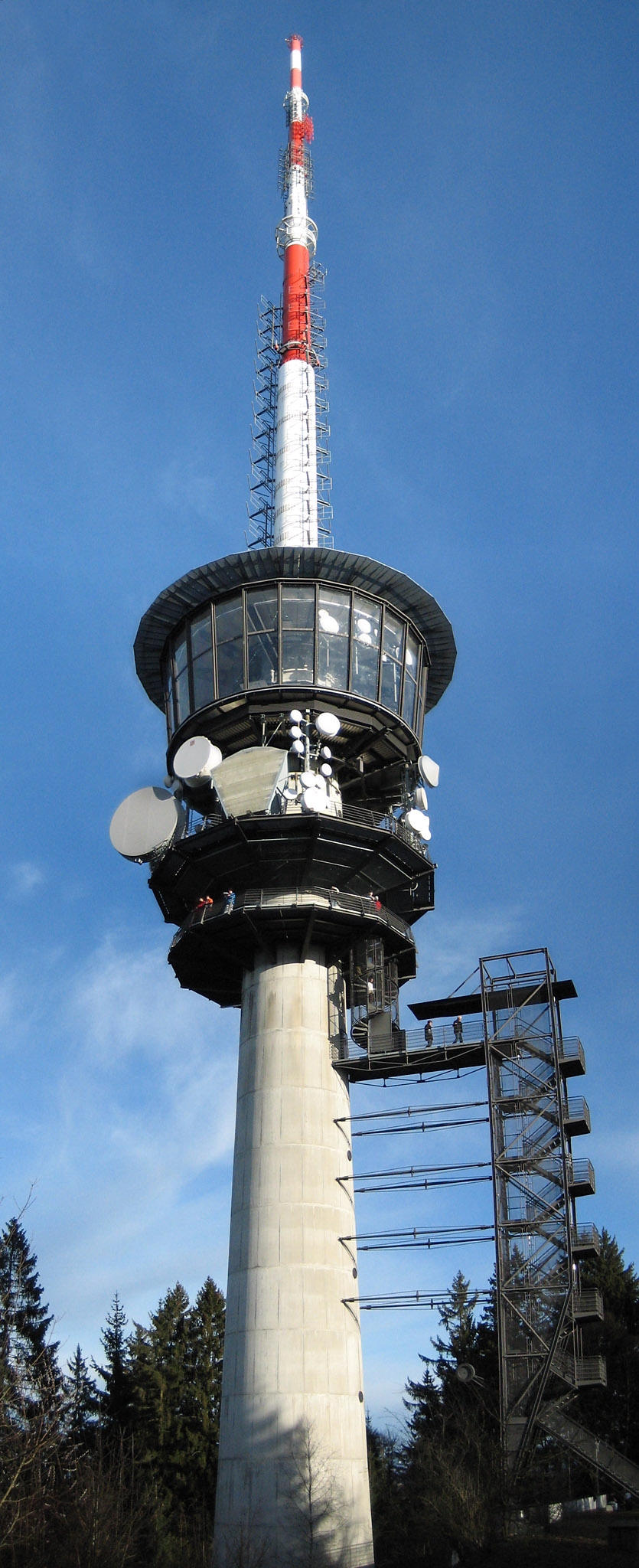
Bantiger TV tower

Bantiger TV Tower is a 196-metre-tall (643 ft) tower used for FM and TV transmission at 46°58′40″N 7°31′43″E on the Bantiger mountain, a mountain east of Bern situated in the municipality of Bolligen. The Bantiger TV Tower was built between 1991 and 1996 as replacement of a 100-metre-tall (330 ft) radio tower, built in 1954. Bantiger TV Tower, which was inaugurated in 1997, has a public observation deck in a height of 33.7 metres (111 ft). In contrast to most other observation decks on TV towers, there is no elevator for visitor access. The access to the deck goes via a stairway, which is not inside the tower, but in a lattice tower attached to the tower's main structure.

== See also ==
- List of tallest structures in Switzerland
- List of towers
