= Bolligen =

- Municipality
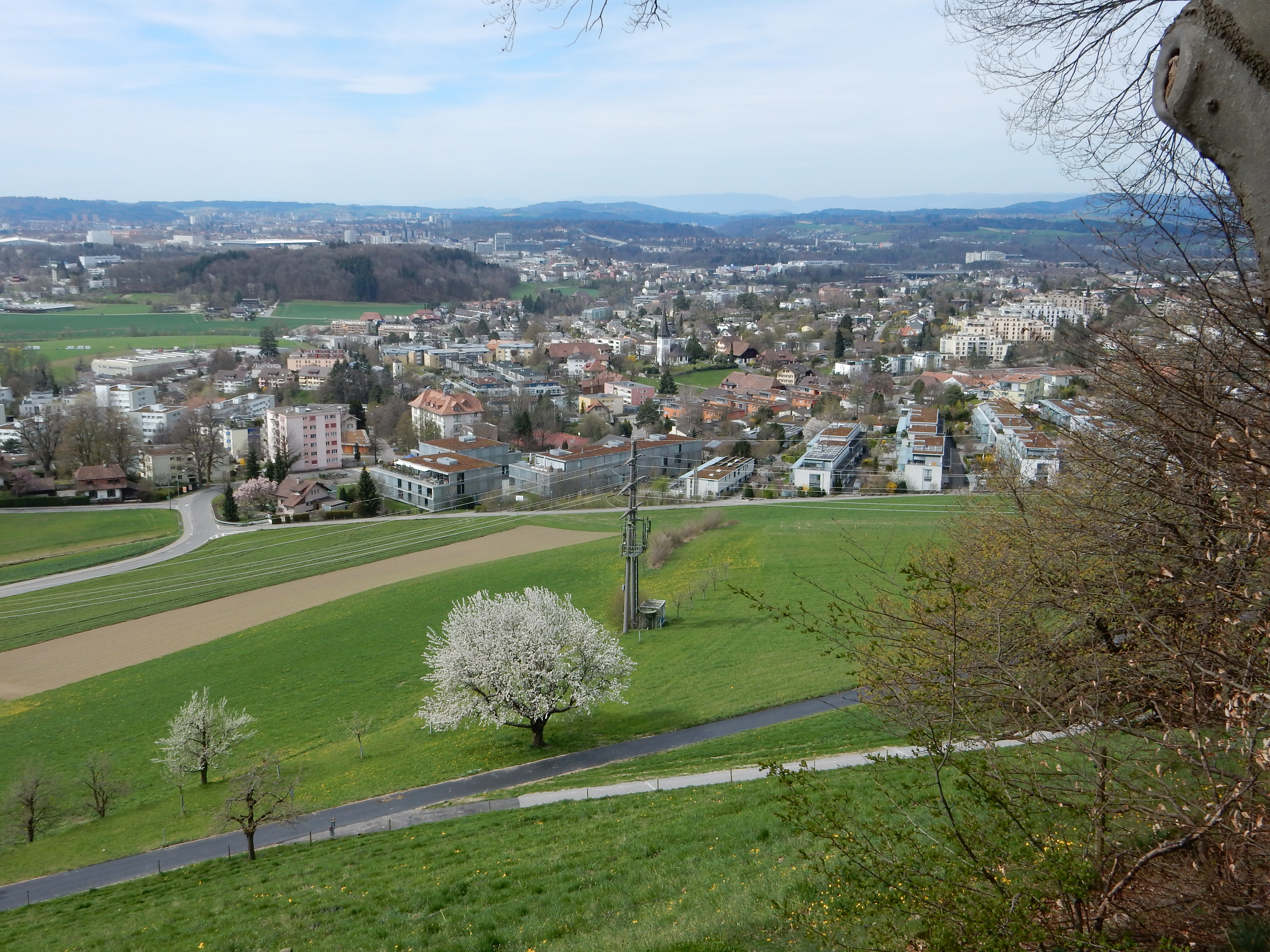

- Flag Coat of arms
- Location of Bolligen
- Location within Switzerland Location within Canton of Bern
- Coordinates: 46°59′N 7°30′E
- Country: Switzerland
- Canton: Bern
- District: Bern-Mittelland

Government
  - Executive: Gemeinderat with 7 members
  - Mayor: Gemeindepräsident; René Bergmann Mitte (as of 2026)

Area
  - Total: 16.57 km^{2} (6.40 sq mi)
- Elevation: 578 m (1,896 ft)

Population (December 2020)
  - Total: 6,308
  - Density: 380.7/km^{2} (986.0/sq mi)
- Time zone: UTC+01:00 (CET)
  - Summer (DST): UTC+02:00 (CEST)
- Postal code: 3065
- SFOS number: 352
- ISO 3166 code: CH-BE
- Localities: Bantigen, Ferenberg bei Stettlen, Flugbrunnen, Geristein, Habstetten
- Surrounded by: Ittigen, Ostermundigen, Stettlen, Vechigen, Krauchthal, Mattstetten, Urtenen-Schönbühl, Moosseedorf, Münchenbuchsee
- Twin towns: Hluboká nad Vltavou (Czech Republic)
- Website: www.bolligen.ch

Bolligen is a municipality in the Bern-Mittelland administrative district of the canton of Bern, Switzerland.

In the historical center is a twelfth-century church, with a benefice barn and parsonage from the 16th century.

== History ==
Bolligen is first mentioned in 1180 as Bollingin.

Traces of a Neolithic settlement were discovered in Burech. There are traces of an earthen fort of an indeterminate age above Flugbrunnen, along with medieval earthen forts at Grauholz and on the Bantiger. Bolligen, Muri bei Bern, Stettlen and Vechigen were the first villages to come under Bern's control as Bern began its expansion into a city-state. During the 13th and 14th centuries, representatives of Bern and the Kyburg Counts often met in Bolligen for negotiations. After the extinction of the Knights of Gerenstein, their castle, Gerenstein Castle and the Geristein farms passed into private ownership. The castle and farm passed through the hands of a number of wealthy Bernese citizens and several monasteries, including Interlaken Monastery and Thorberg Charterhouse. The city of Bern also continued to acquire rights around Bolligen. In 1345 it bought Habstetten from Berchtold of Thornberg. Following the Protestant Reformation in 1528, Bern secularized a number of monasteries around the Canton. From the Thorberg Chapterhouse they acquired the low court in Bolligen and from Interlaken Monastery the rights over Bolligen's church. The Grauholz-Sädelbach woods near Bolligen became a popular summer retreat for Bern's patrician families. An early example of these was the Wegmühle house which was built in 1600 and then renovated in 1669. It was followed by the Hubelgut house in Habstetten in 1670 and in 1720 by the Lindeburg house.

The village church of St. Niklaus was first mentioned in 1180. It was probably the family church of the Gerenstein family. The current church was built in the 12th or 13th century and expanded in the 15th century. In 1792-95 it was renovated and repaired. In 1274 Ulrich of Stein gave the patronage over the church to Interlaken Monastery. After the secularization of the monastery in 1528, the church's patronage fell to Bern, who made it the parish church for Habstetten. The parish grew to include 30 villages, hamlets and farms with a population of 1,771 in 1764. In 1834, the political municipality was created from this large parish. Following a long running debate on whether to centralize (1930, 1945, 1963), incorporate in Bern (1913, 1919) or decentralize (1956, 1962, 1972), in 1978 the residents decided to divide the municipality into three independent municipalities; Bolligen, Ittigen and Ostermundigen.

Beginning in the 18th century, farmers in Bolligen began to grow hay in addition to the traditional grain. The hay was sold to provide food during winter for the many dairy and cattle farms that were developing in the surrounding area. Also in the 18th century large industrial operations opened. These included; the quarries in Stockeren (1708-1918/49) and the paper mill in the Wegmühle which opened in 1787 and converted into a grain mill in 1855. The municipality remained a mostly rural town until the agglomeration of Bern spread into Bolligen in 1950s transforming it. Agricultural land was replaced by shopping centers and housing developments. Many of the residents of the municipality commute to Bern for work and by 1990, over three-fourths of the workers were commuters. The expansion of the infrastructure has led, in part, to urbanization. Primary schools are located in Bolligen, Ferenberg and Geristein, along with a secondary school and a pre-Gymnasium in Bolligen.as well as in a secondary school and lower secondary school. Since 1913, following the example Worblental train.

== Geography ==
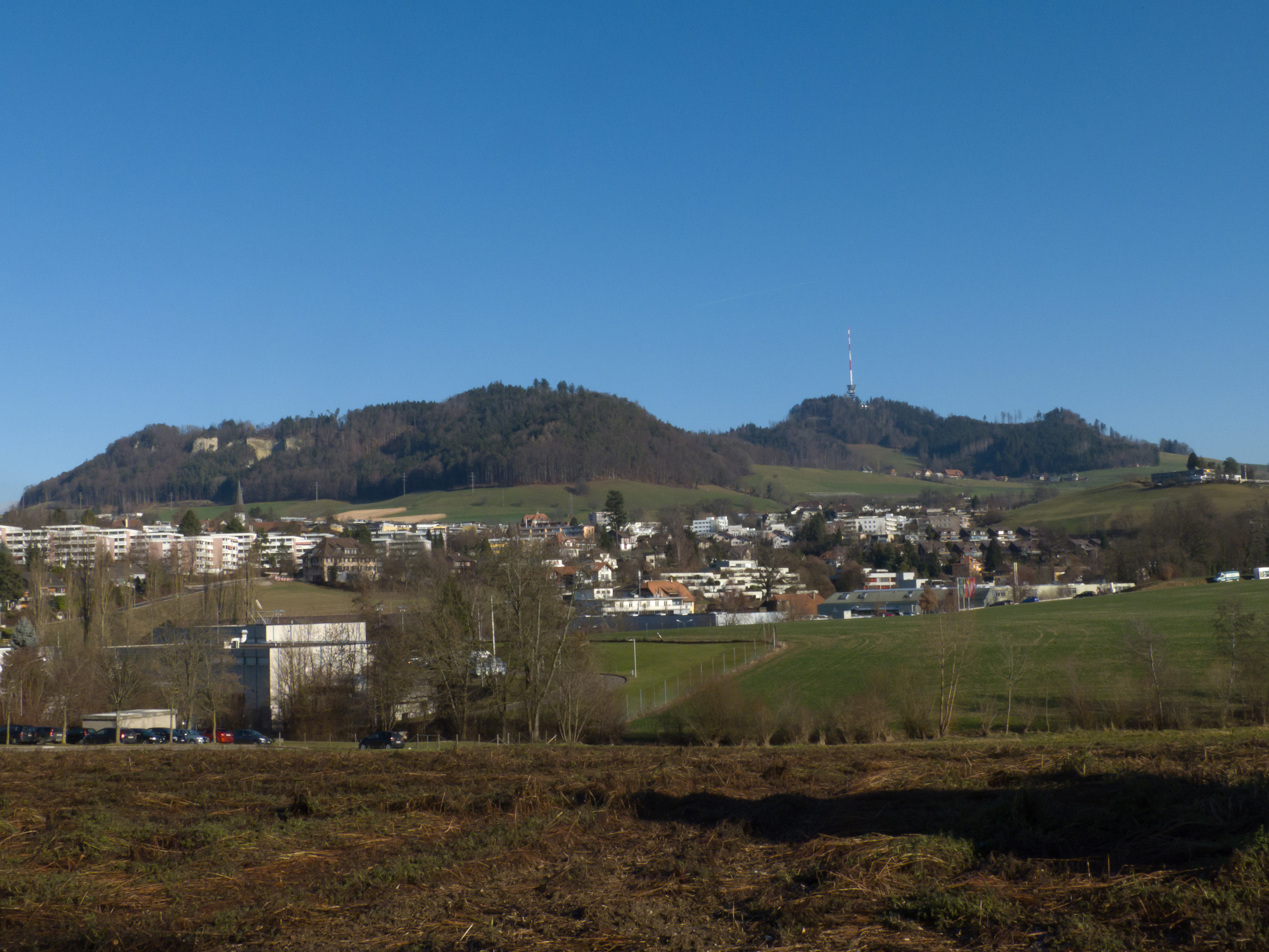
Bantiger mountain with Bolligen in the foreground

Bolligen has an area of 16.57 km^{2} (6.40 sq mi). Of this area, 7.17 km^{2} (2.77 mi^{2}) or 43.3% is used for agricultural purposes, while 7.29 km^{2} (2.81 mi^{2}) or 44.0% is forested. Of the rest of the land, 2.05 km^{2} (0.79 mi^{2}) or 12.4% is settled (buildings or roads), 0.03 km^{2} (7.4 acres) or 0.2% is either rivers or lakes and 0.02 km^{2} (4.9 acres) or 0.1% is unproductive land.

Of the built up area, housing and buildings made up 7.2% and transportation infrastructure made up 3.3%. Out of the forested land, all of the forested land area is covered with heavy forests. Of the agricultural land, 26.1% is used for growing crops and 14.8% is pastures, while 2.4% is used for orchards or vine crops. All the water in the municipality is flowing water.

The municipality is located in the agglomeration of Bern. Bolligen lies northeast of Bern, its area connects the Worblental to the Emmental. The "Lutzere" mountains form the watershed boundary between the Emme and the Aare rivers.

In 1980 and 1983, the small but heavily populated towns of Ittigen and Ostermundigen divided from Bolligen to form independent municipalities. It consists of the village of Bolligen and the hamlets of Bantigen, Ferenberg, Flugbrunnen, Geristein and Habstetten.

In the municipality is the Bantiger mountain (947 m [3,107 ft]). The transmission tower of Swisscom located there supplies the surrounding region with radio and television programs. The mountain also provides a panorama of the Jura Mountains, the Swiss Plateau, and the Alps.

On 31 December 2009 Amtsbezirk Bern, the municipality's former district, was dissolved. On the following day, 1 January 2010, it joined the newly created Verwaltungskreis Bern-Mittelland.

== Coat of arms ==
The blazon of the municipal coat of arms is Gules a Chevron and Chevron inverted Argent frettee.

== Demographics ==
Bolligen has a population (as of December 2020) of 6,308. As of 2010, 7.2% of the population are resident foreign nationals. Over the last 10 years (2000-2010) the population has changed at a rate of 2%. Migration accounted for 2.7%, while births and deaths accounted for 0%.

Most of the population (as of 2000) speaks German (5,490 or 93.2%) as their first language, French is the second most common (130 or 2.2%) and Italian is the third (60 or 1.0%). There are 9 people who speak Romansh.

As of 2008, the population was 47.9% male and 52.1% female. The population was made up of 2,692 Swiss men (44.3% of the population) and 218 (3.6%) non-Swiss men. There were 2,944 Swiss women (48.5%) and 222 (3.7%) non-Swiss women. Of the population in the municipality, 1,189 or about 20.2% were born in Bolligen and lived there in 2000. There were 2,659 or 45.1% who were born in the same canton, while 1,313 or 22.3% were born somewhere else in Switzerland, and 605 or 10.3% were born outside of Switzerland.

As of 2010, children and teenagers (0–19 years old) make up 19.1% of the population, while adults (20–64 years old) make up 55.4% and seniors (over 64 years old) make up 25.4%.

As of 2000, there were 2,171 people who were single and never married in the municipality. There were 3,210 married individuals, 276 widows or widowers and 236 individuals who are divorced.

As of 2000, there were 661 households that consist of only one person and 141 households with five or more people. In 2000, a total of 2,436 apartments (91.3% of the total) were permanently occupied, while 197 apartments (7.4%) were seasonally occupied and 34 apartments (1.3%) were empty. As of 2010, the construction rate of new housing units was 2.5 new units per 1000 residents. The vacancy rate for the municipality, in 2011, was 1.11%.

The historical population is given in the following chart:

== Heritage sites of national significance ==
The Kleingewerbler House and the Wegmühle are listed as Swiss heritage site of national significance. The entire Worbletal area is part of the Inventory of Swiss Heritage Sites.

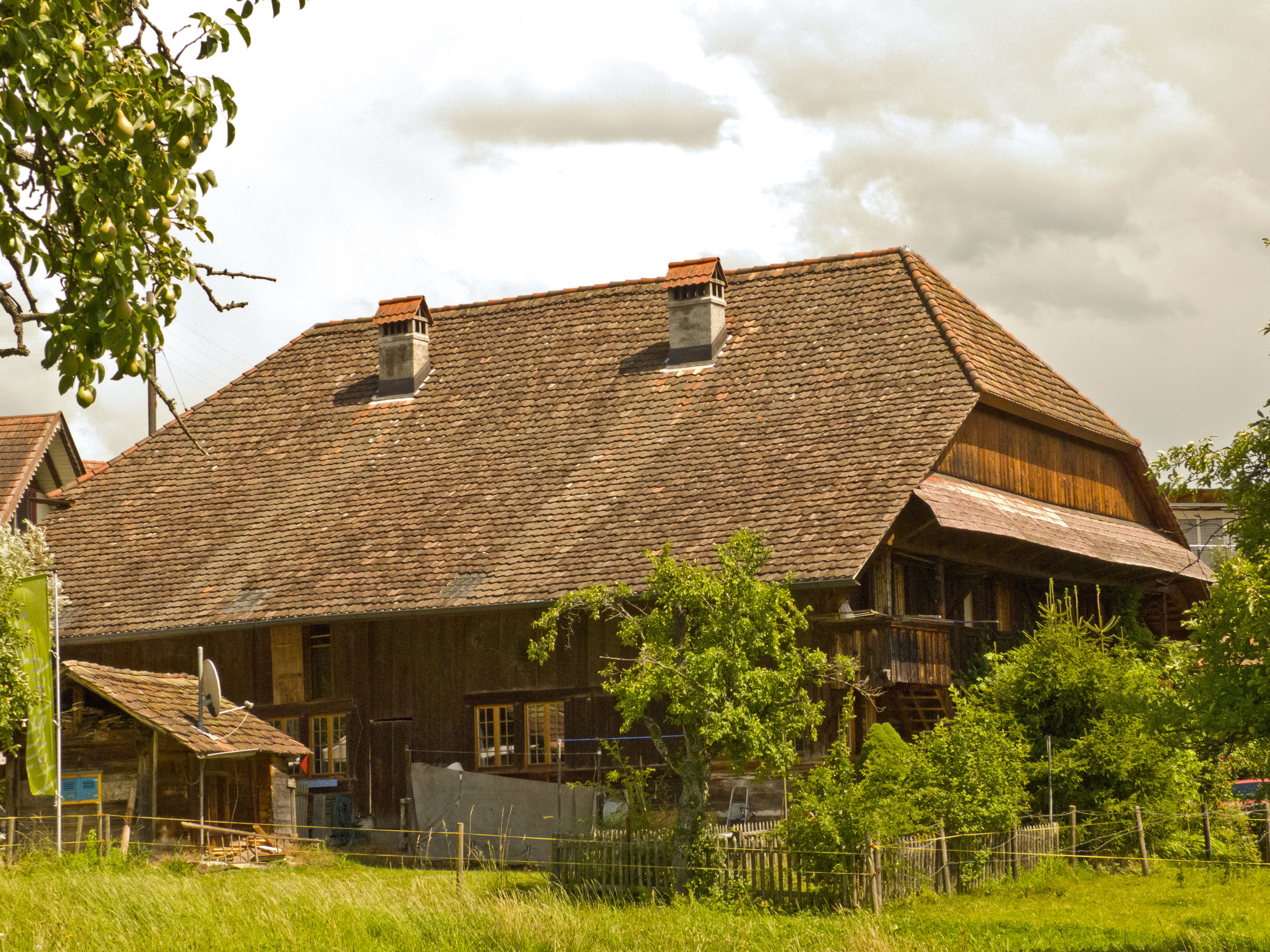
Kleingewerbler house

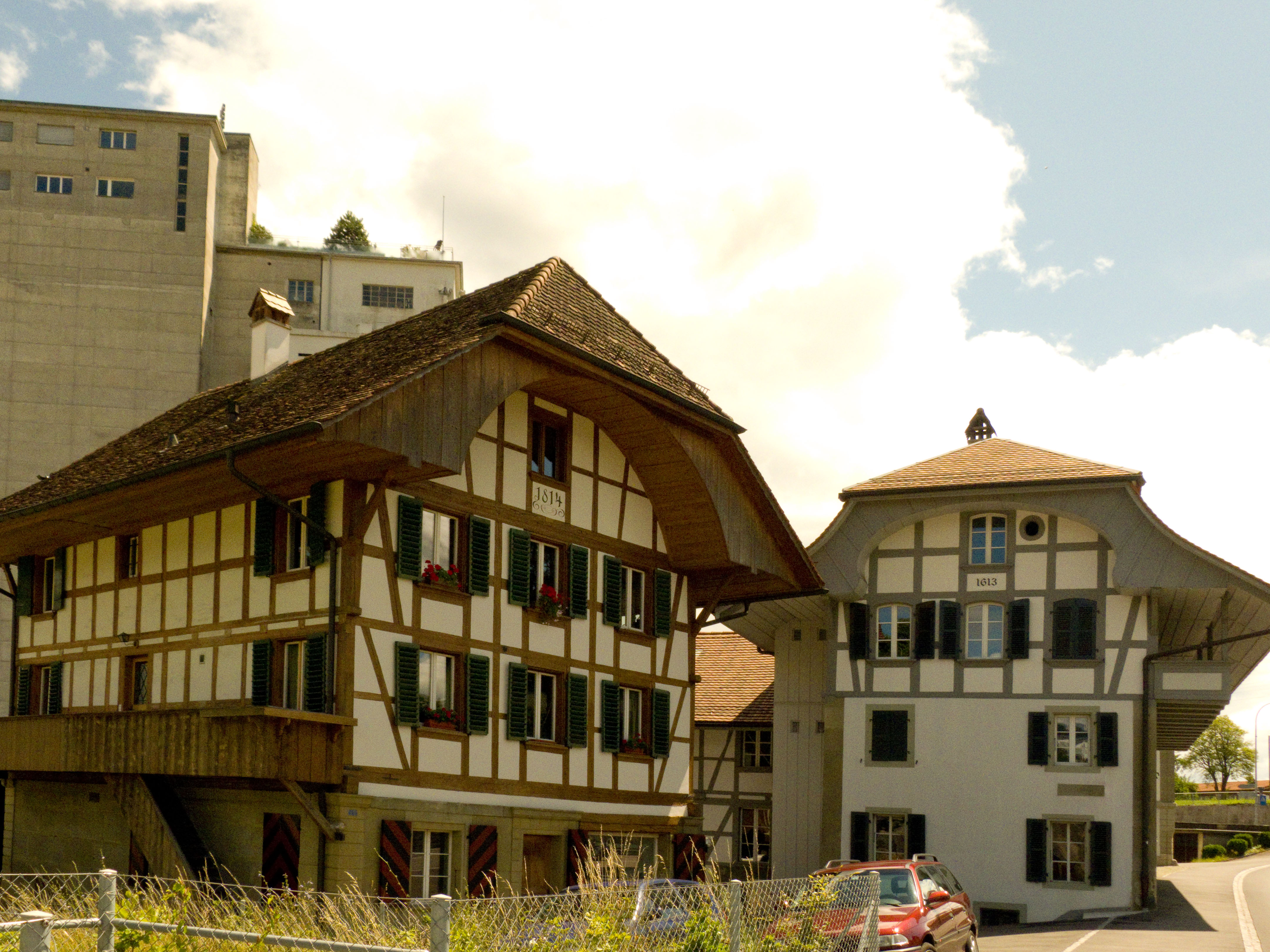
The Wegmühle in Bolligen

== Twin Town ==
Bolligen is twinned with the town of Hluboka, Czech Republic.

== Politics ==
In the municipal council the Free Democratic Party of Switzerland (FDP, 2), Social Democratic Party of Switzerland (SP, 3), Swiss People's Party (SVP, 1), and "Bolligen Parteilos" ("cross-bencher," BP, 1) are represented (as of May 2006).

In the 2007 election the most popular party was the SVP which received 25.9% of the vote. The next three most popular parties were the FDP (23.9%), the SPS (20%) and the Green Party(12%).

In the 2011 federal election the most popular party was the SVP which received 22% of the vote. The next three most popular parties were the SPS (20.2%), the BDP Party (16.1%) and the FDP (15.7%). In the federal election, a total of 3,077 votes were cast, and the voter turnout was 64.7%.

The mayor, Margret Kiener Nellen, is the representative of the canton of Bern in the National Council of Switzerland and a member of the Social Democratic Party of Switzerland.

== Economy ==
As of 2011, Bolligen had an unemployment rate of 1.62%. As of 2008, there were a total of 1,683 people employed in the municipality. Of these, there were 127 people employed in the primary economic sector and about 43 businesses involved in this sector. 362 people were employed in the secondary sector and there were 39 businesses in this sector. 1,194 people were employed in the tertiary sector, with 151 businesses in this sector.

In 2008 there were a total of 1,367 full-time equivalent jobs. The number of jobs in the primary sector was 88, all of which were in agriculture. The number of jobs in the secondary sector was 331 of which 232 or (70.1%) were in manufacturing and 93 (28.1%) were in construction. The number of jobs in the tertiary sector was 948. In the tertiary sector; 477 or 50.3% were in wholesale or retail sales or the repair of motor vehicles, 40 or 4.2% were in a hotel or restaurant, 43 or 4.5% were in the information industry, 26 or 2.7% were the insurance or financial industry, 64 or 6.8% were technical professionals or scientists, 66 or 7.0% were in education and 119 or 12.6% were in health care.

In 2000, there were 1,009 workers who commuted into the municipality and 2,388 workers who commuted away. The municipality is a net exporter of workers, with about 2.4 workers leaving the municipality for every one entering. Of the working population, 35.9% used public transportation to get to work, and 41.6% used a private car.

== Religion ==
From the 2000 census, 971 or 16.5% were Roman Catholic, while 3,935 or 66.8% belonged to the Swiss Reformed Church. Of the rest of the population, there were 32 members of an Orthodox church (or about 0.54% of the population), there were 7 individuals (or about 0.12% of the population) who belonged to the Christian Catholic Church, and there were 350 individuals (or about 5.94% of the population) who belonged to another Christian church. There were 6 individuals (or about 0.10% of the population) who were Jewish, and 37 (or about 0.63% of the population) who were Islamic. There were 5 individuals who were Buddhist, 17 individuals who were Hindu and 3 individuals who belonged to another church. 536 (or about 9.10% of the population) belonged to no church, are agnostic or atheist, and 150 individuals (or about 2.55% of the population) did not answer the question.

== Education ==
In Bolligen about 2,579 or (43.8%) of the population have completed non-mandatory upper secondary education, and 1,294 or (22.0%) have completed additional higher education (either university or a Fachhochschule). Of the 1,294 who completed tertiary schooling, 70.2% were Swiss men, 23.2% were Swiss women, 4.3% were non-Swiss men and 2.2% were non-Swiss women.

The Canton of Bern school system provides one year of non-obligatory Kindergarten, followed by six years of Primary school. This is followed by three years of obligatory lower Secondary school where the students are separated according to ability and aptitude. Following the lower Secondary students may attend additional schooling or they may enter an apprenticeship.

During the 2009-10 school year, there were a total of 658 students attending classes in Bolligen. There were 4 kindergarten classes with a total of 80 students in the municipality. Of the kindergarten students, 8.8% were permanent or temporary residents of Switzerland (not citizens) and 10.0% have a different mother language than the classroom language. The municipality had 17 primary classes and 346 students. Of the primary students, 4.6% were permanent or temporary residents of Switzerland (not citizens) and 6.6% have a different mother language than the classroom language. During the same year, there were 12 lower secondary classes with a total of 221 students. There were 6.8% who were permanent or temporary residents of Switzerland (not citizens) and 5.4% have a different mother language than the classroom language.

As of 2000, there were 111 students in Bolligen who came from another municipality, while 355 residents attended schools outside the municipality.

== Points of interests ==
- Bantiger TV Tower
