= Bantiger =

Mountain in Switzerland

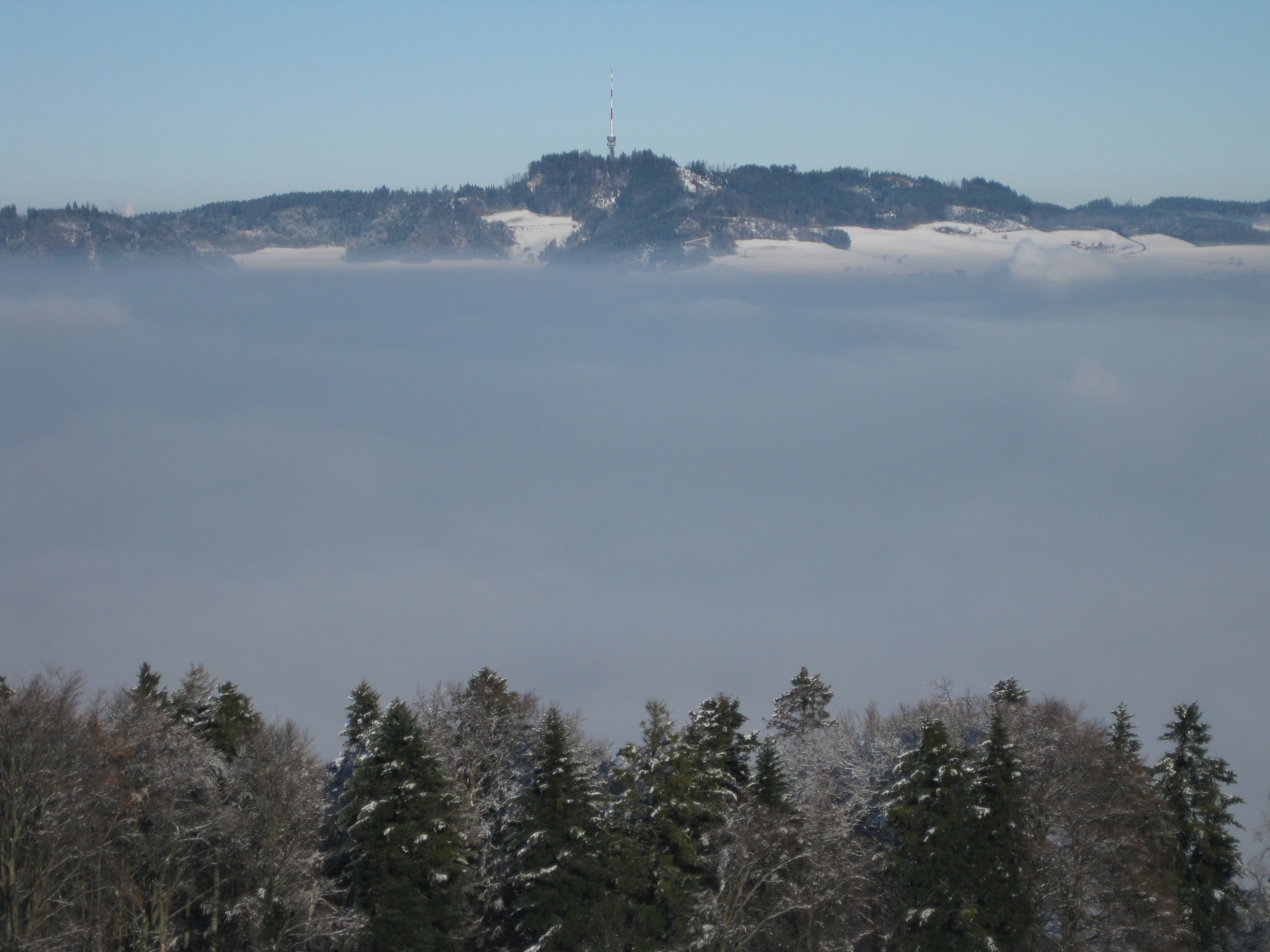
- View of the Bantiger from the Gurten

Highest point
- Elevation: 947 m (3,107 ft)
- Prominence: 320 m (1,050 ft)
- Parent peak: Blasenflue
- Coordinates: 46°58′41″N 7°31′39″E

Geography
- Location within Switzerland
- Location: Bern, Switzerland
- Parent range: Emmental Alps

Climbing
- Easiest route: Road

The Bantiger is a mountain north of the Emmental Alps, overlooking the region of Bern. It is located east of Ittigen and north of Stettlen, in the canton of Bern.

The Bantiger TV Tower, on the summit, is a 196-metre-tall (643 ft) tower used for FM and TV transmission.
