= Blosenbergturm =

Disused radio transmitter in Switzerland

Coordinates: 47°11′22.4″N 8°10′31.5″E

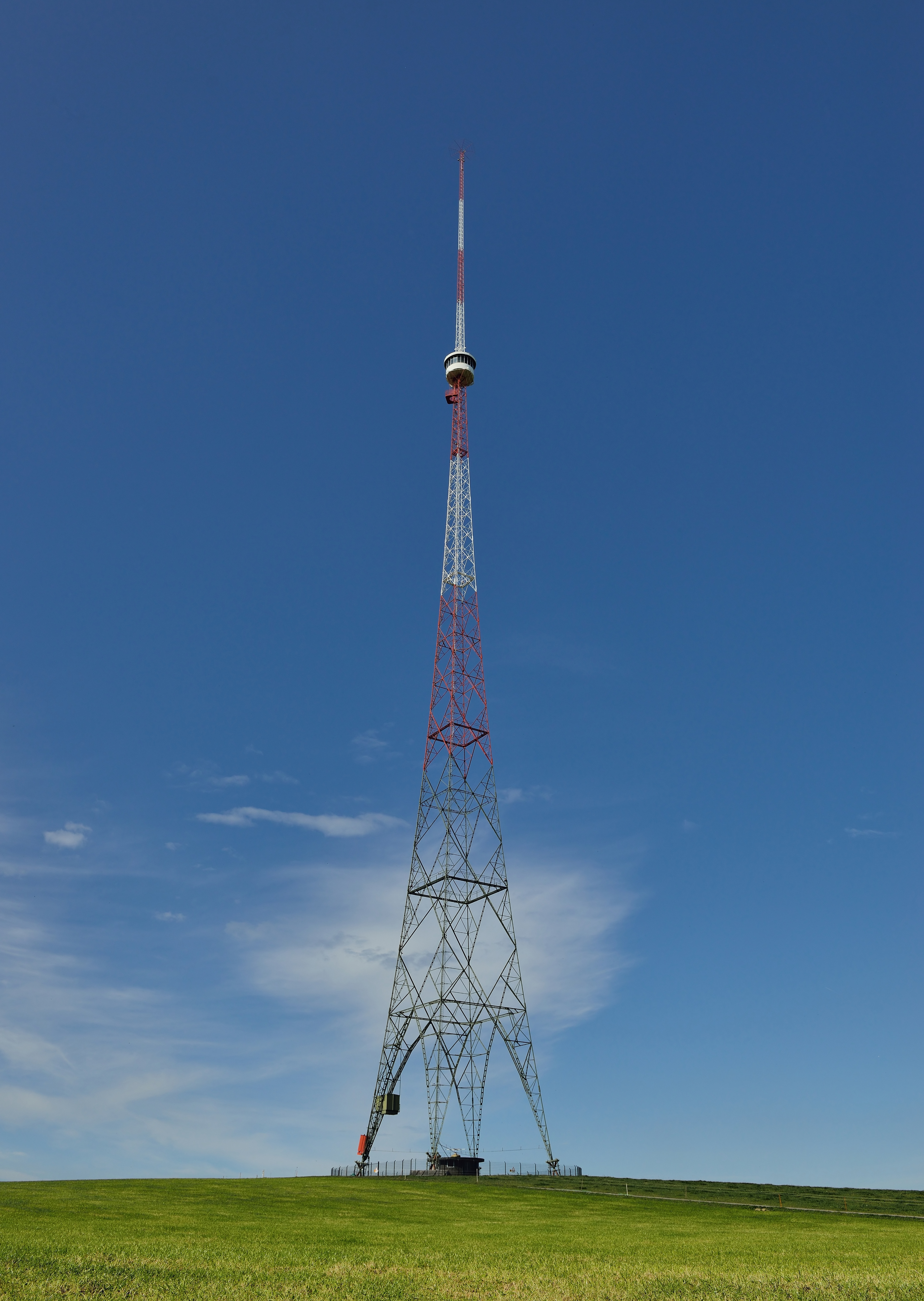
The Blosenbergturm at Beromünster

The Blosenbergturm is a former radio transmission tower built for the German-language radio station DRS at Beromünster in the Canton of Lucerne, Switzerland, in 1937. It radiated first at 529 kHz and later at 531 kHZ, the lowest officially allocated frequency in the European medium-wave band.

The Blosenbergturm is a self-radiating tower insulated against ground, i.e. the entire tower structure is used as an antenna. With a total height of 217 metres (712 ft) it is currently the sixth tallest structure in Switzerland. It has a cabin at a height of 150 m (490 ft), containing a coil for feeding the pinnacle, which is insulated against the rest of the tower, separately with high frequency power. Originally the tower was used as a dipole antenna, fed from the cabin.

There was another, 126 m (413 ft) tall, freestanding lattice tower nearby, dismantled in 2011, which, like the Blosenbergturm, was a tower radiator insulated against the ground. This tower, which was built in 1931, carried – together with a second tower, which was dismantled and rebuilt at Sankt Chrischona near Basel as a television transmission tower – a T-antenna for medium wave until 1962. After this date, it was transformed into a tower radiator, serving as a backup transmitter for the Blosenbergturm itself.

The aircraft warning lights on the Blosenbergturm have a special feature: at dawn, a rotating beamer above the cabin comes into service. This beamer, which is much less bright than the beamers on the Stuttgart TV Tower, is switched off at night and the red aircraft warning lights are turned on. By watching the blinking light on the pinnacle of the tower, one could detect whether the transmitter was working. The high electrical field surrounding the top of the tower when the transmitter was powered meant that at such times the light glowed faintly, even in the blink breaks.

The Beromünster transmitter was shut down at midnight (CET) on 28 December 2008, despite some protests against the measure. The 1931 backup tower was dismantled in 2011; the Blosenberg tower itself was declared a heritage monument and may become part of an on-site museum.

== See also ==
- Lattice tower
- List of famous transmission sites
