= Blasenflue =

Mountain in Switzerland

- Location within Switzerland

Highest point
- Elevation: 1,118 m (3,668 ft)
- Prominence: 413 m (1,355 ft)
- Parent peak: Hohgant
- Coordinates: 46°55′56″N 7°41′45″E

Geography
- Location: Bern, Switzerland
- Parent range: Bernese Alps

The Blasenflue (1,118 metres (3,668 ft)) is a mountain of the Bernese Alps, located near Signau in the canton of Bern.
