= Swisscom-Sendeturm St. Chrischona =

Communications tower near Basel, Switzerland

Coordinates: 47°34′18″N 07°41′13″E

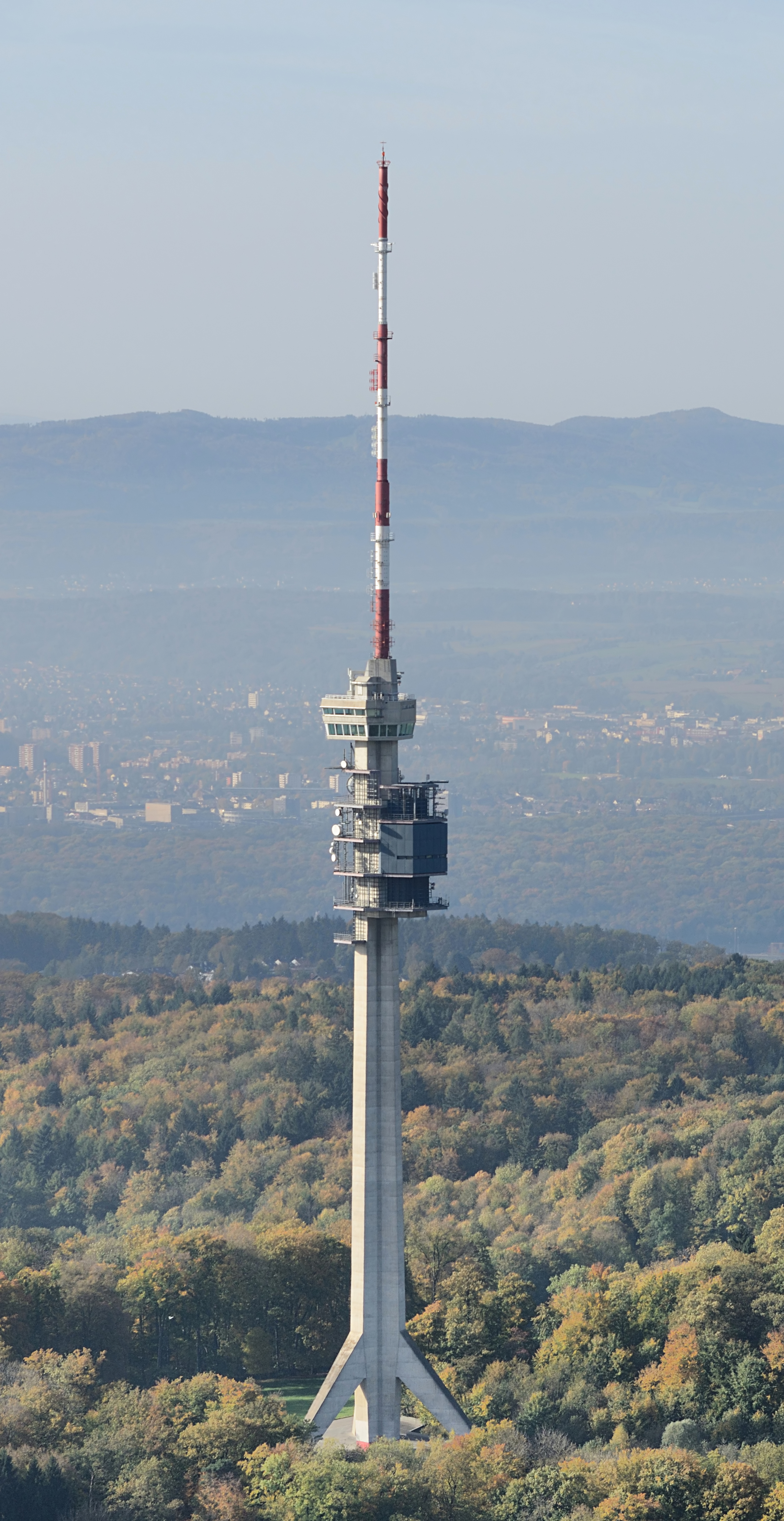
Swisscom-Sendeturm St. Chrischona, aerial view

Swisscom-Sendeturm St. Chrischona is a communications tower built in 1980–1984 near Basel, Switzerland, on the territory of the municipality Bettingen, Basel-Stadt.

It was built as a replacement for a 136-metre (446 ft) tall lattice tower, which was erected at the site in 1962. This lattice tower was once a part of the famous Beromünster transmitter.

The tower is 248 m (814 ft) tall, composed of a 96 m (315 ft) steel antenna on a 152 m (499 ft) concrete base, and not generally accessible for the public, although guided visits can be booked. Apart from television, FM radio and DAB transmitters, and microwave relays, the tower also contains meteorological instruments, two 100 m^{3} (3,500 cu ft) drinking water tanks, and a meeting/conference room near the top of the concrete structure.

== Architecture ==
The television tower St Chrischona shows some architecturally specific features. It features a "3-leg-construction", in contrast to most other television towers nearby. It has an aerodynamic shape; with a round shaft, the wind from both sides splits and causes, at the rear, an effect that keeps the tower from swaying too strongly. The lower part is star-shaped, and the tower at the apex sways up to 30 cm (12 in) even with strong winds. The "Antennenspitze" (round construction method), can sway up to 2.5 m (8 ft 2 in). The microwave radio relay antennas are of a height between 98 and 131 m (322 and 430 ft). VHF antennas are 152 m (499 ft) high.

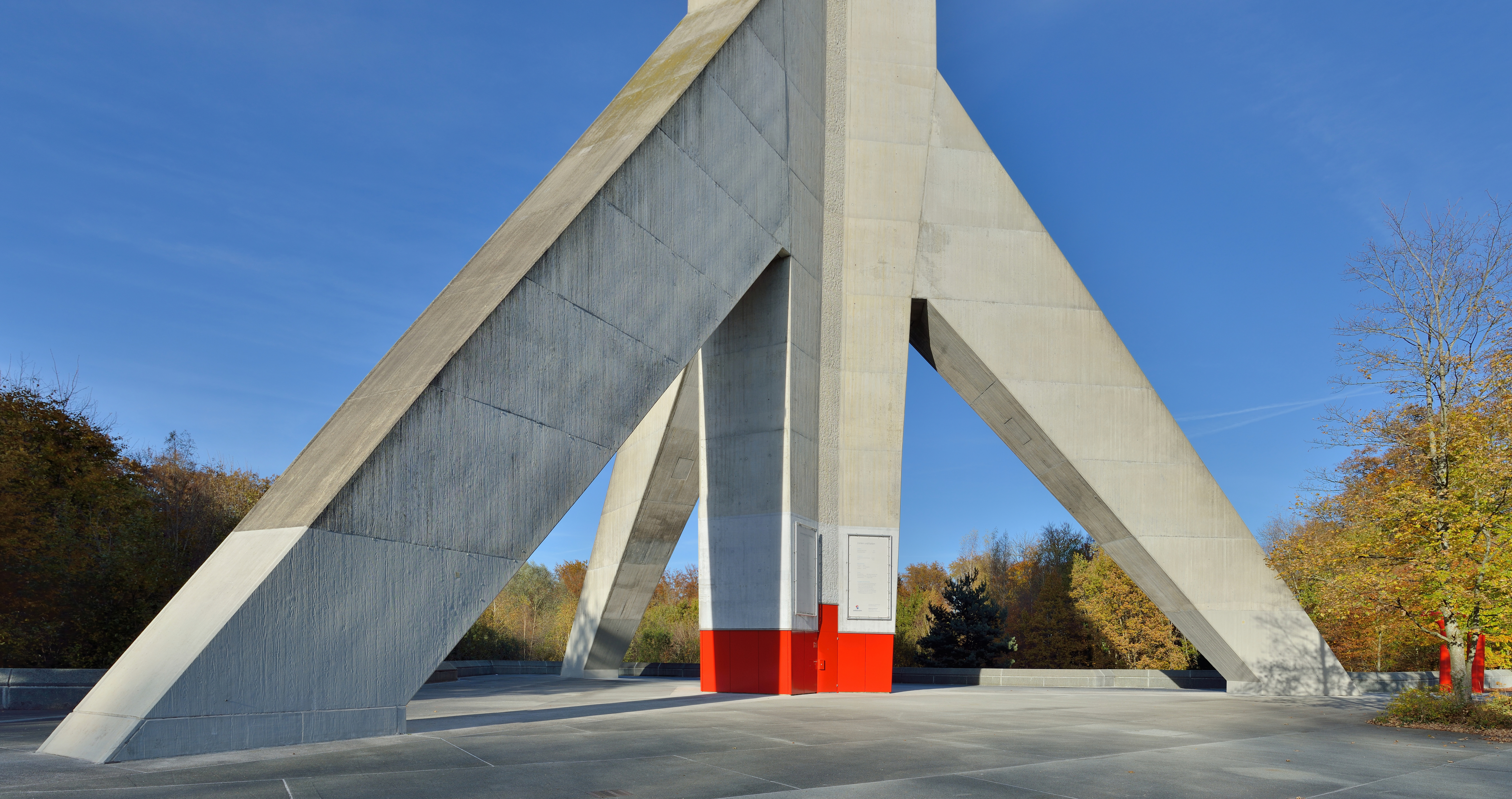
Tripod construction on the towers base

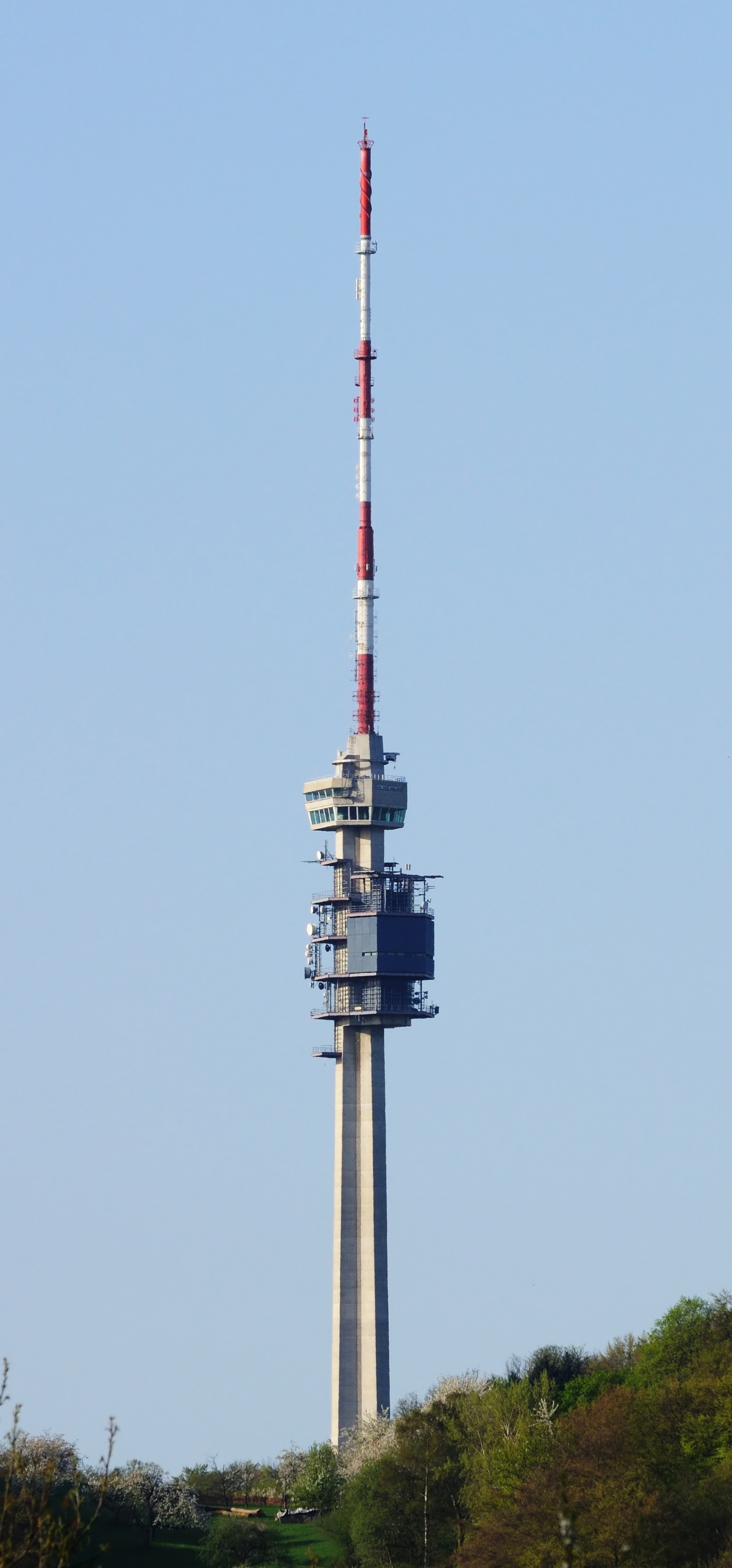
Tower from northeast

On the north side is a construction similar to a "backpack" which has a height of 103 m (338 ft); and two drinking water tanks that are 100 m (330 ft) high that contain water supplies for the municipality of Bettingen. During the construction, the weight of the water had to be included in the tension of the tower, which is why it stood southwardly inclined before the completion.

The tower stands on a base construction which includes three basements which accommodate company / technical equipment. As the location of the tower lies in the seismic zone of Basel – Erdbebengebiet in the Upper Rhine district, this has been built especially securely about the base. The tower should remain stable in an earthquake up to 8 on the Richter scale.

The television tower was under construction from July 1980 until December 1983, and was put into operation on 2 August 1984. It replaced a 136 m (446 ft) tall steel radio tower that was built in 1962 in Beromünster, where it carried an antenna for medium wave transmission, like today's backup broadcasting tower. St Chrischona has been in use since 1954, as a broadcasting tower that was 30 m (98 ft) tall at that time which transferred Swiss television programmes. Today's tower of St Chrischona carries broadcasting antennas for Swiss Radio (DRS) and "Southwest German Radio" (SWR). Due to the unique construction, it is said that the tower could remain standing during the high winds of a hurricane, where wind speeds appear up to 220 km/h, with an oscillation of only 40 cm (16 in).

== Technical data ==
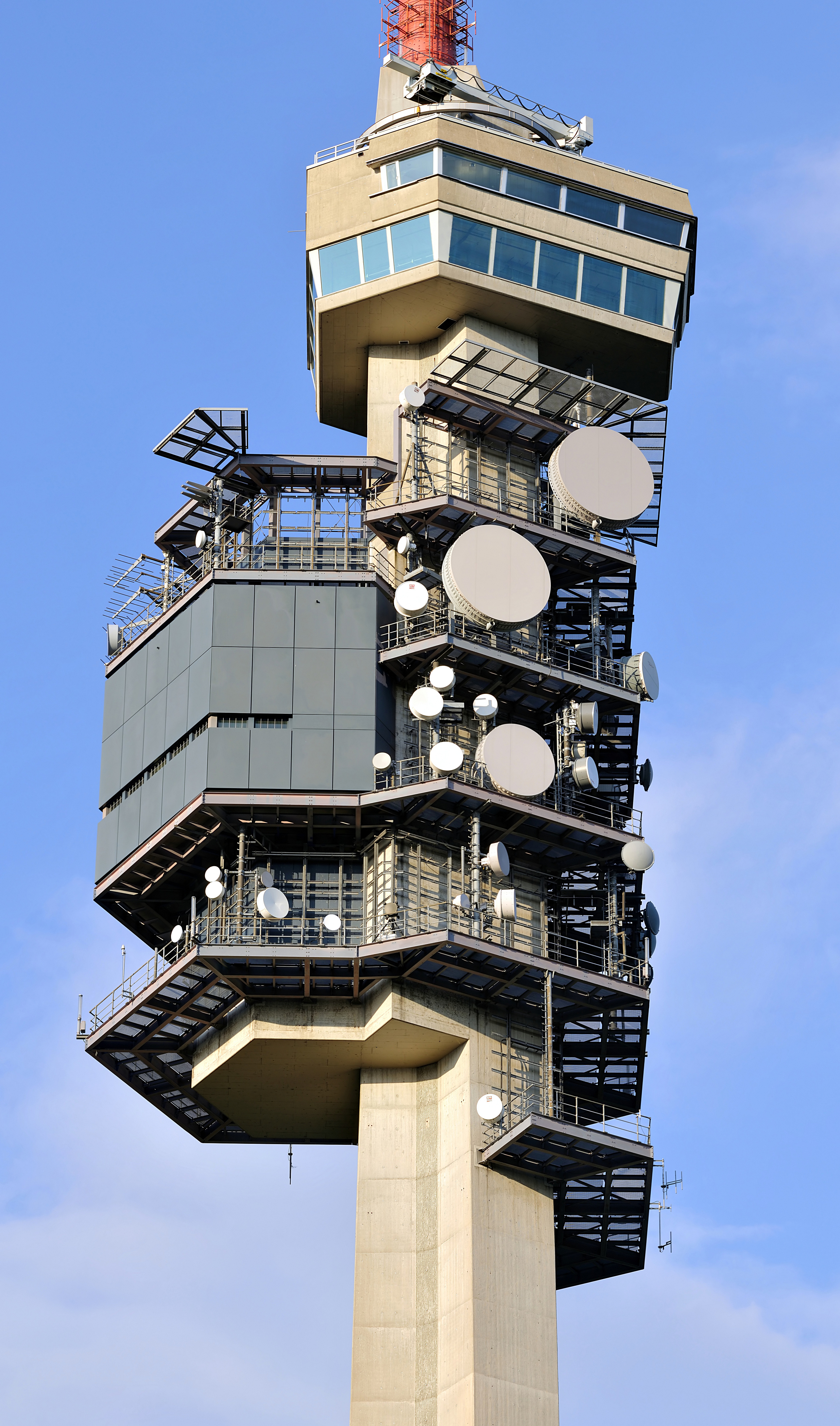
Mainpod of the tower

- The entire height of 250 m (820 ft) is divided into a 152 m (499 ft) tall shaft with a tower basket and a 98 m (322 ft) tall antenna
- Architects: Vischer & Weber
- Civil Engineer work: Aegerter & Bosshardt
- Building cost: 50 million Swiss francs
- Concrete volume: 10,000 cubic metres (350,000 cu ft)
- Total weight: 23,000 metric tons, of which; 13,500 metric tons are in the foundation and 9,500 metric tons in the tower

- Armouring weight; 1,300 metric tons, steel pipe tower, 135 metric tons
- Steel for the antenna terraces: 120 metric tons, introduction steel: 90 metric tons

- Uses

- Transmitter, for among other things, television programmes SF 1 and SF two, the radio programmes DRS 1, DRS 2, DRS 3, Baden-Wurttemberg SWR1, SWR2, SWR 3, Baden-Wurttemberg SWR4, radio Basel 1 and radio basilisk.
- In addition, the tower serves for the radio and phone transference and for the water supply communications. Measuring instruments are, in addition, used for weather forecasting and aerial coordination. In an emergency, the tower can be likewise used as a transmitter.

== Broadcast television channels ==
Program	Channel
SF 1	46
SF 2	49
TeleRegio	68
DVB-T (*)	31

* for the programs on: SF1, SF2, TSI1, TSR1

== Broadcast radio stations ==
Sender name	Frequency
DRS 1 BS	90.6 MHz
DRS 2	99.0 MHz
DRS 3	103.6 MHz
Radio Basilisk	107.6 MHz
Energy Basel	101.7 MHz
Radio X	94.5 MHz
SWR1 Baden-Württemberg	87.9 MHz
SWR2	92.0 MHz
SWR3	98.3 MHz
SWR4 Hochrheinradio	89.5 MHz
