= Harvesting lightning energy =

Energy source

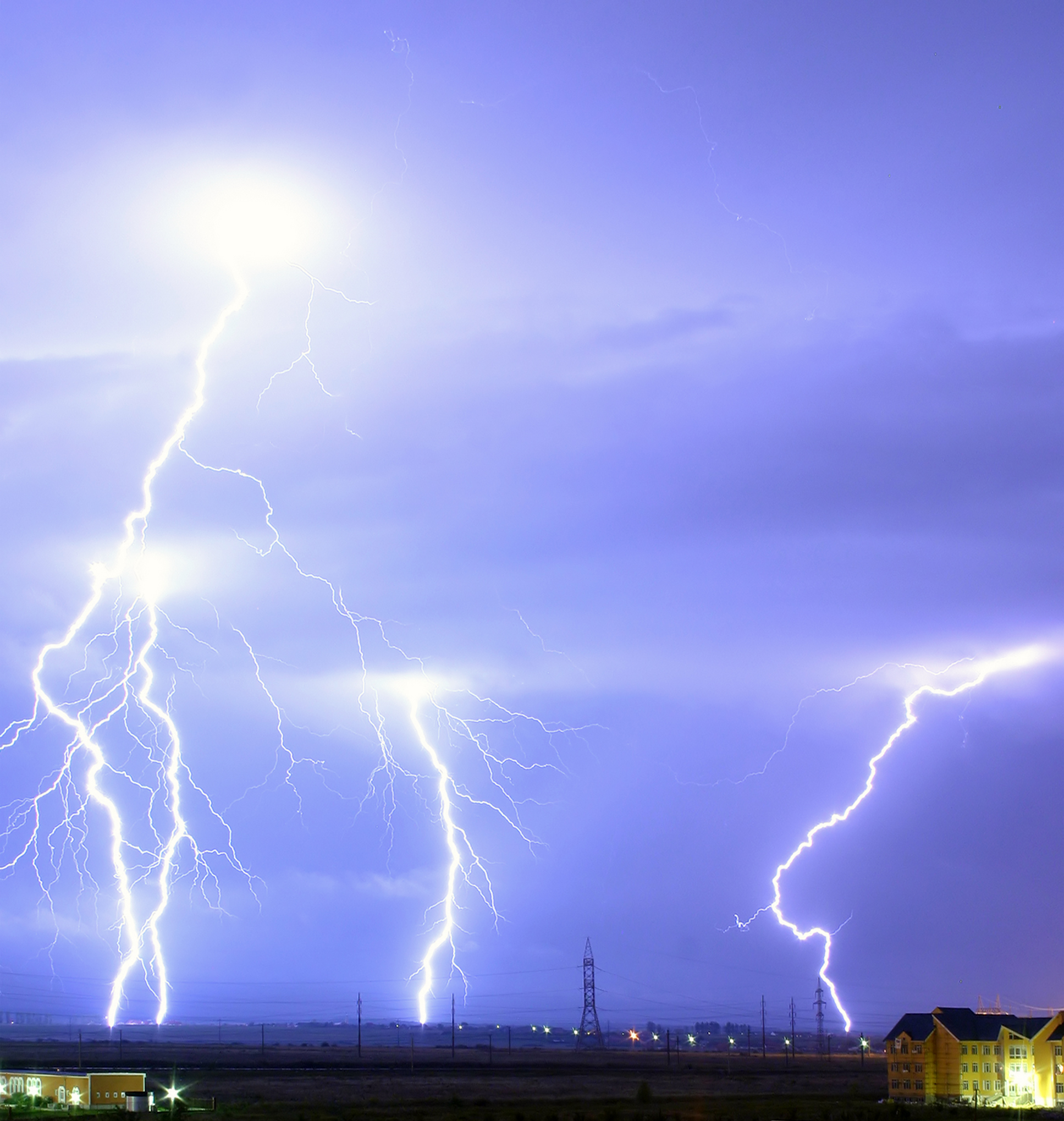
Lightning over the outskirts of Oradea, Romania, August 17, 2005

Since the late 1980s, there have been several attempts to investigate the possibility of harvesting lightning energy. A single bolt of lightning carries a relatively large amount of energy (approximately 5 gigajoules or about the energy stored in 40 Imperial gallons or 200 litres of gasoline). However, this energy is concentrated in a small location and is passed during an extremely short period of time (microseconds); therefore, extremely high electrical power is involved. It has been proposed that the energy contained in lightning be used to generate hydrogen from water, to harness the energy from rapid heating of water due to lightning, or to use a group of lightning arresters to harness a strike, either directly or by converting it to heat or mechanical energy, or to use inductors spaced far enough away so that a safe fraction of the energy might be captured.

== Overview ==
A technology capable of harvesting lightning energy would need to be able to rapidly capture the high power involved in a lightning bolt. Additionally, lightning is sporadic, and therefore energy would have to be collected and stored; it is difficult to convert high-voltage electrical power to the lower-voltage power that can be stored.

In the summer of 2007, an alternative energy company called Alternate Energy Holdings, Inc. (AEHI) tested a method for capturing the energy in lightning bolts. The design for the system had been purchased from an Illinois inventor named Steve LeRoy, who had reportedly been able to power a 60-watt light bulb for 20 minutes using the energy captured from a small flash of artificial lightning. The method involved a tower, a means of shunting off a large portion of the incoming energy, and a capacitor to store the rest. According to Donald Gillispie, CEO of AEHI, they "couldn't make it work," although "given enough time and money, you could probably scale this thing up... it's not black magic; it's truly math and science, and it could happen."

According to Martin A. Uman, co-director of the Lightning Research Laboratory at the University of Florida and a leading authority on lightning, "a single lightning strike, while fast and bright, contains very little energy by the time it gets down to earth, and dozens of lightning towers like those used in the system tested by AEHI would be needed to operate five 100-watt light bulbs for the course of a year". When interviewed by The New York Times, he stated that "the energy in a thunderstorm is comparable to that of an atomic bomb, but trying to harvest the energy of lightning from the ground is hopeless".

Another major challenge when attempting to harvest energy from lightning is the impossibility of predicting when and where thunderstorms will occur. Even during a storm, it is very difficult to tell where exactly lightning will strike.

== Directed plasma channels ==
To facilitate the harvesting of lightning, a laser-induced plasma channel (LIPC) could theoretically be used to influence lightning to strike in a predictable location. A high power laser could be used to form an ionized column of gas, which would act as an atmospheric conduit for electrical discharges of lightning, which would direct the lightning to a ground station for harvesting.

Teramobile, an international project initiated jointly by a French-German collaboration of CNRS (France) and DFG (Germany), has managed to trigger electric activity in thunderclouds by ultrashort lasers. A large peak pulse power was used, 5 terawatts, although the average power was only 2.7 W, as a result of the extremely short (150 femtosecond) pulse length. For the moment, the application of laser-channeled lightning is to use energy to divert the lightning and prevent damage instead of harvesting the lightning energy.

== See also ==
- Distribution of lightning
- Jean-Pierre Wolf
- Ludger Wöste
