= Gäbris =

Mountain in Switzerland

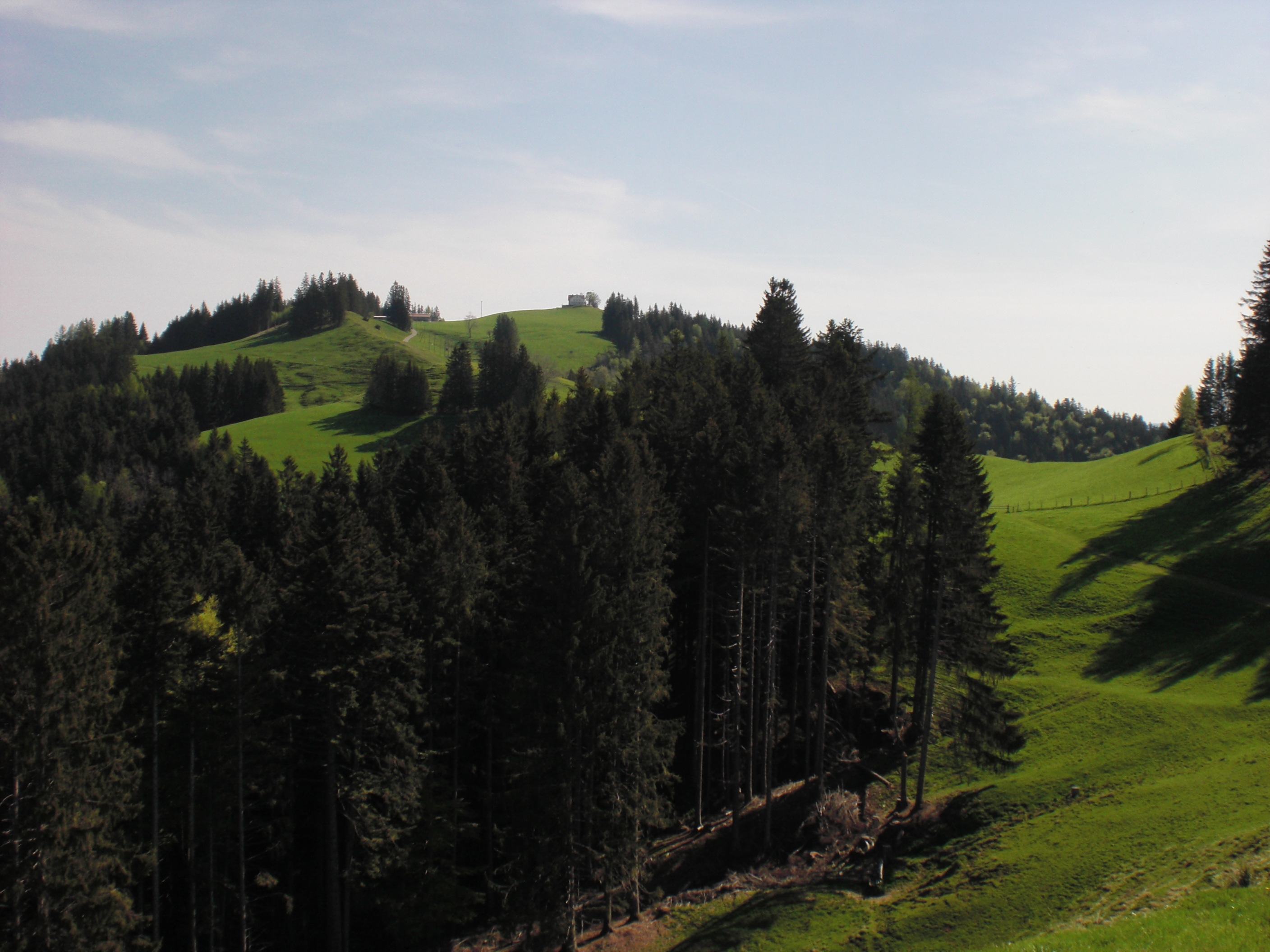
- View from the west side

Highest point
- Elevation: 1,251 m (4,104 ft)
- Prominence: 367 m (1,204 ft)
- Parent peak: Säntis
- Coordinates: 47°22′54″N 9°28′04″E

Geography
- Location within Switzerland Location within Canton of Appenzell Ausserrhoden
- Location: Appenzell Ausserrhoden
- Country: Switzerland
- Parent range: Appenzell Alps

Gäbris is a mountain of the Appenzell Alps, overlooking Gais in the canton of Appenzell Ausserrhoden, Switzerland.

== See also ==
- List of mountains of Appenzell Ausserrhoden
