= List of mountains of Appenzell Ausserrhoden =

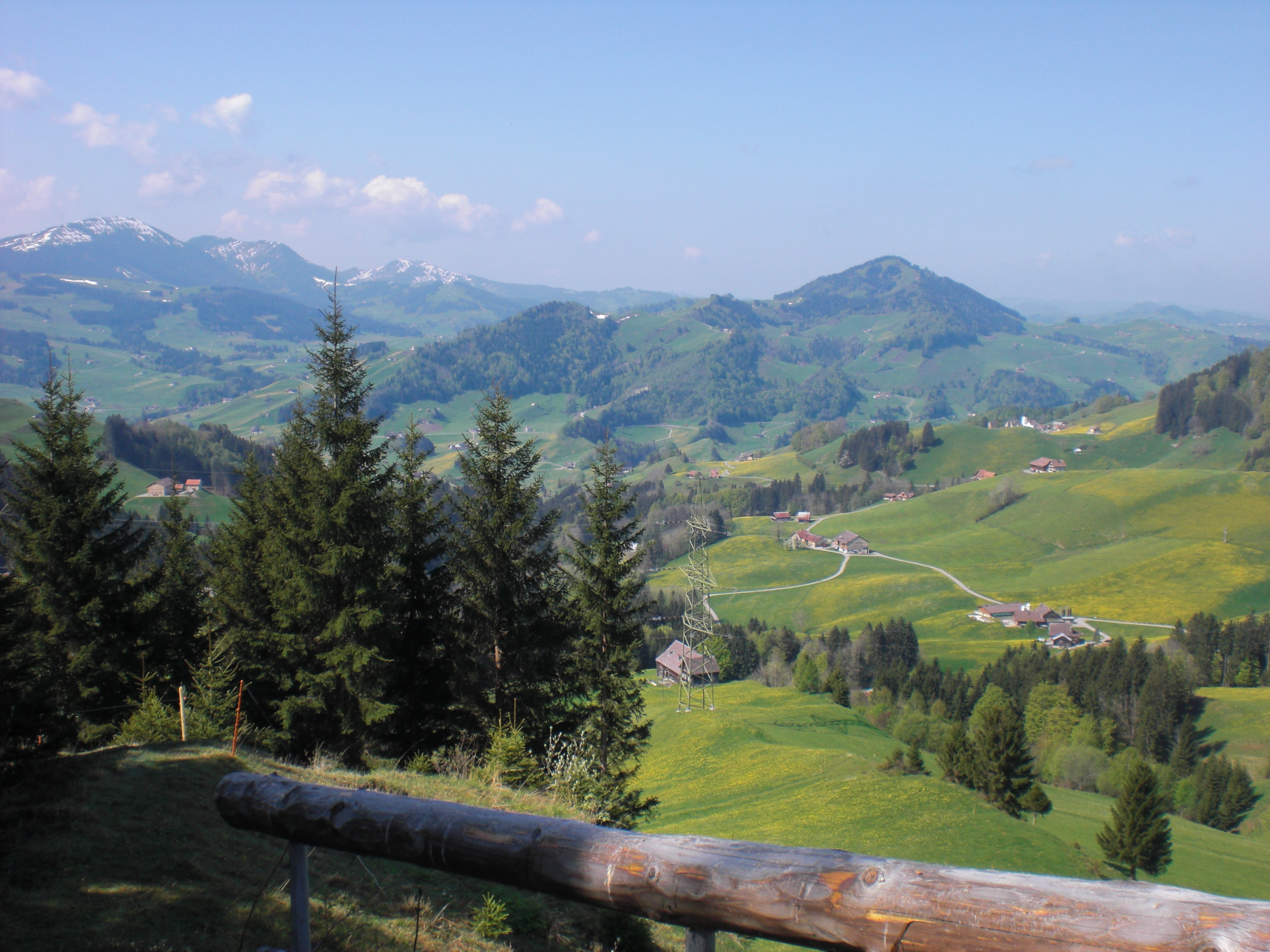
The Hundwiler Höhi (Kronberg in the background)

This is a list of mountains of the canton of Appenzell Ausserrhoden in Eastern Switzerland. The canton is located in the Appenzell Alps. The Säntis, which marks the tripoint with the cantons of Appenzell Innerrhoden and St. Gallen, is the most elevated and most prominent mountain of Appenzell Ausserrhoden. The canton's highest summits are all located in the Alpstein massif.

All mountain heights and prominences on the list are from the largest-scale maps available.

== Topographic prominence of 150 metres or more ==
This list only includes significant summits with a topographic prominence of at least 150 metres (492 ft).

Mountain	Height (m)	Drop (m)	Coordinates	Municipality	First ascent	Notes
Säntis	2502	2015	47°14′58″N 09°20′36″E	Hundwil	1680	Highest peak of the Alpstein. Summit is the tripoint of the borders with the cantons of Appenzell Innerrhoden and St. Gallen (Toggenburg)
Hochalp	1530	260	47°16′31″N 09°15′14″E	Urnäsch		
Hundwiler Höhi	1306	406	47°20′27″N 09°20′00″E	Hundwil		Summit located on the border with the canton of Appenzell Innerrhoden (Gonten)
Gäbris	1251	367	47°22′54″N 09°28′04″E	Gais		

== Topographic prominence of less than 150 metres ==
Mountain	Height (m)	Drop (m)	Coordinates	Municipality	First ascent	Notes
Grenzchopf	2193	108	47°14′49″N 09°19′25″E	Hundwil		Peak of the Alpstein. Summit located on the border with the canton of St. Gallen (Toggenburg)

== See also ==
- List of mountains of Switzerland
- Swiss Alps
