= Daisendorf =

- Municipality
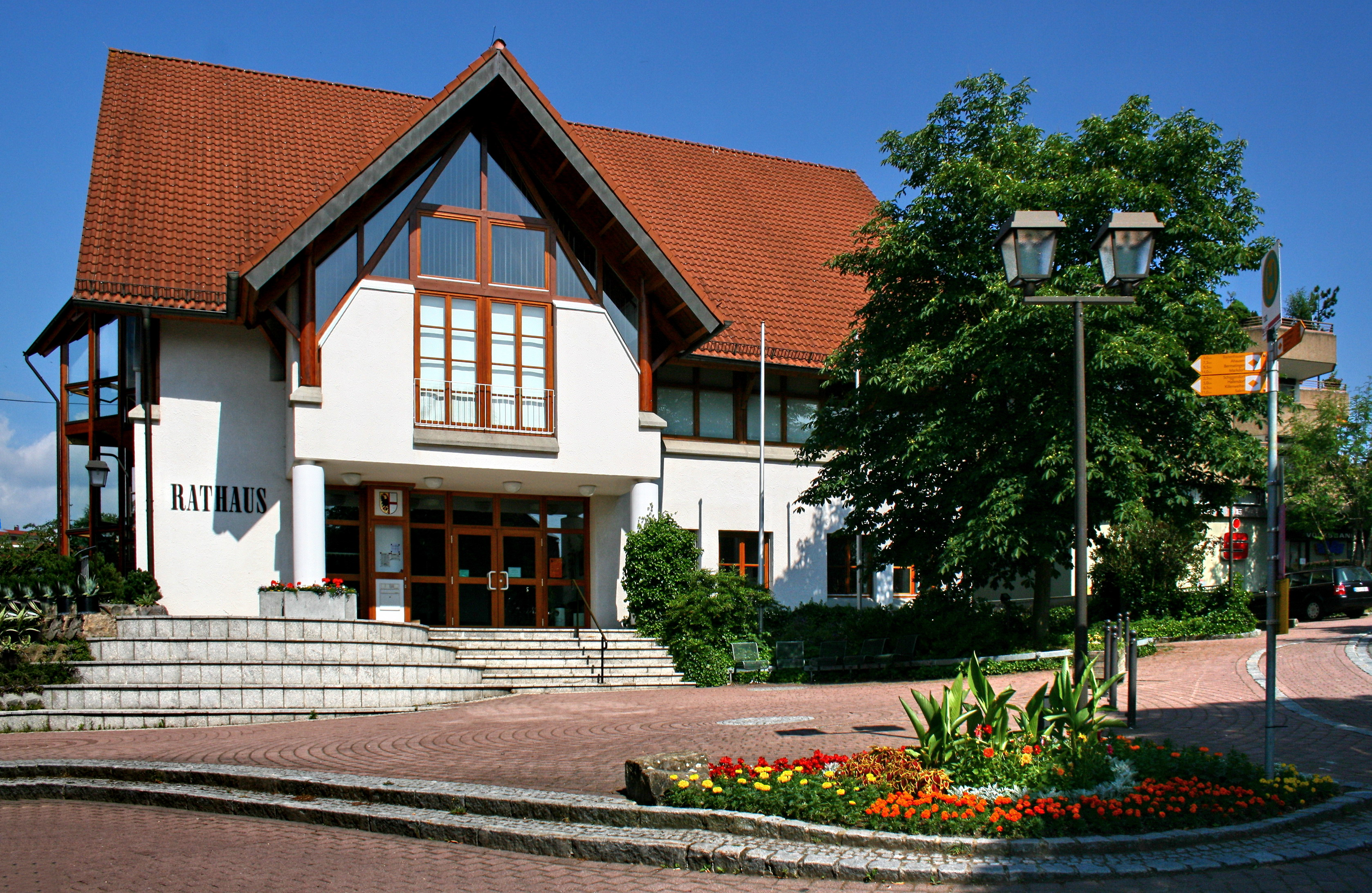
- Town hall

- Coat of arms

- Location of Daisendorf within Bodenseekreis district
- Interactive map of Daisendorf
- Location within Germany Location within Baden-Württemberg
- Coordinates: 47°42′37″N 9°16′21″E
- Country: Germany
- State: Baden-Württemberg
- Admin. region: Tübingen
- District: Bodenseekreis
- Municipal assoc.: Meersburg

Government
  - Mayor (2017–25): Jacqueline Alberti (Ind.)

Area
  - Total: 2.44 km^{2} (0.94 sq mi)
- Elevation: 497 m (1,631 ft)

Population (2025-12-31)
  - Total: 1,546
  - Density: 634/km^{2} (1,640/sq mi)
- Time zone: UTC+01:00 (CET)
  - Summer (DST): UTC+02:00 (CEST)
- Postal codes: 88718
- Dialling codes: 07532
- Vehicle registration: FN / ÜB
- Website: www.daisendorf.de

Daisendorf is a village and a commune with about 1600 inhabitants in south-western Germany. It is part of the Bodensee district, which is part of the Land Baden-Württemberg.

== Geography ==
Daisendorf is situated on a hill about 2 km north of Meersburg. It lies above Lake Constance. It is largely surrounded by the commune of Meersburg, with a short border with Uhldingen-Mühlhofen to the north.

== History ==
Daisendorf was first settled in the 8th century. Given its isolation through marshy terrain and hills, it was only first documented in 1222 when the Abbot of Salem purchased the tithes of the village from the Lords of Vaz. The sovereignty over the village, however, always belonged to the Prince-Bishopric of Constance. The conflict of rights between the abbot and the prince-bishop led to a series of disputes that were mediated by town jurors; the first of which occurred in 1295. Plague, crop failures, and a decrease in the price of grain devastated the community in the 14th century, and slowly the prince-bishopric lost influence in the region. These difficulties induced the prince-bishop to transfer Daisendorf to the Free City of Überlingen in 1334. The prince-bishop reclaimed Daisendorf for 400 guilders in 1507.

In the Reichsdeputationshauptschluss of 1803, in which the principalities of the ecclesiastic rulers were dispersed to the counts and princes of the empire, Daisendorf was given to the Electorate of Baden.

== Economy ==
Daisendorf is a popular tourist destination in the Lake of Constance region, featuring views of the Swiss Alps (Säntisregion) and the lake, as well as a diverse rural community.

== Culture and sights ==
=== Edifices ===
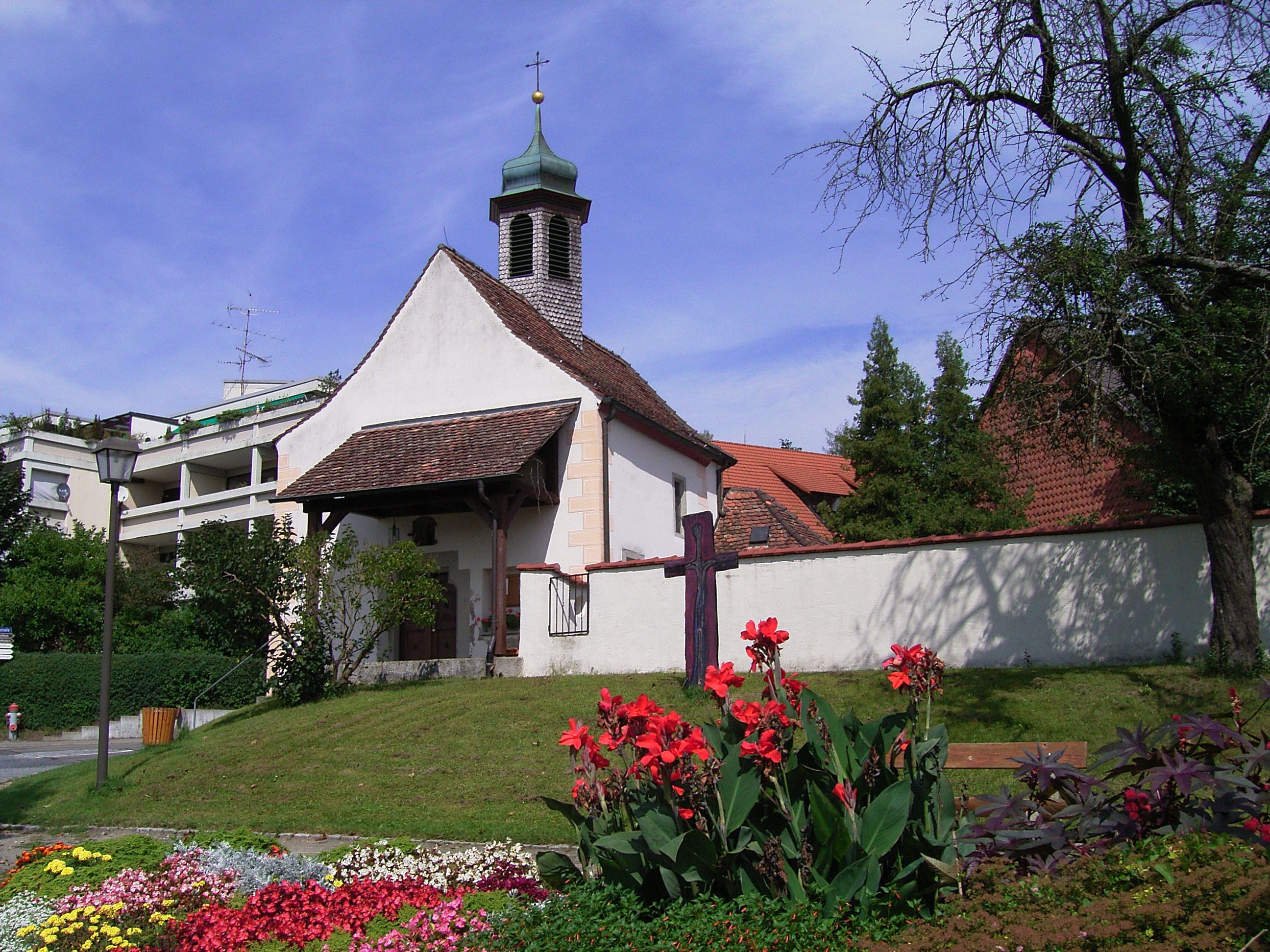
Saint Martin Chapel in Daisendorf.

The village has an ancient chapel St. Martin, which was built in 1508 and holds unique fresques of the renaissance age.

=== Regular events ===
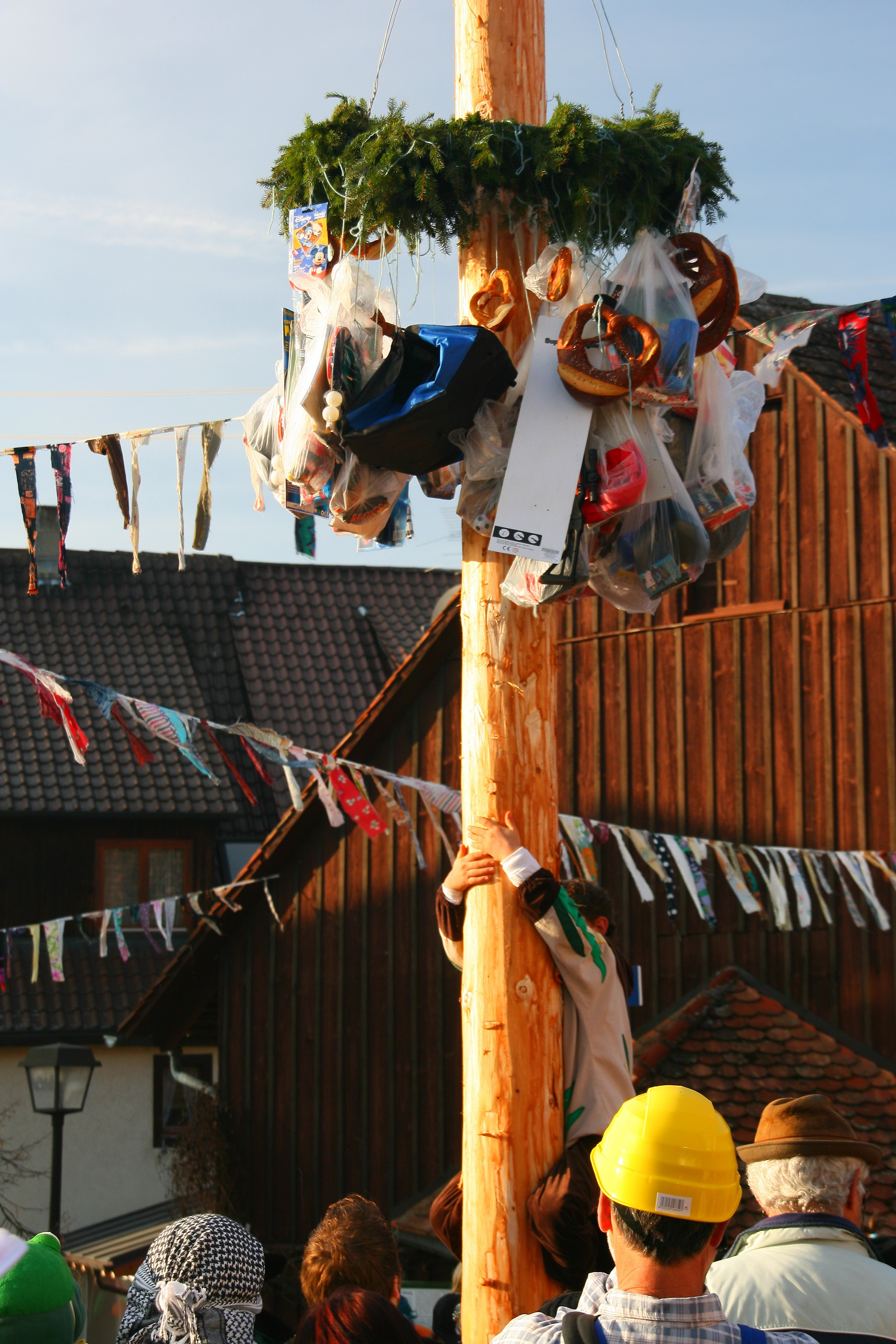
This is the fools tree (in allemannic: "Narrebom") with a green wreath and a child climbing the tree

Daisendorf features several yearly happenings.

- Carnival season. In South Germany: "Fastnacht", in allemanic idiom "Fasnet" when a tree is planted in the middle of the village ("Narrenbaum")
- Village festivities in July
- Well festivities of carpenter's guild
- Wine festivities at the third weekend of August: this popular Weinfest takes place as a celebration and tasting of harvest of the regional wineries.

=== Beauty of nature ===
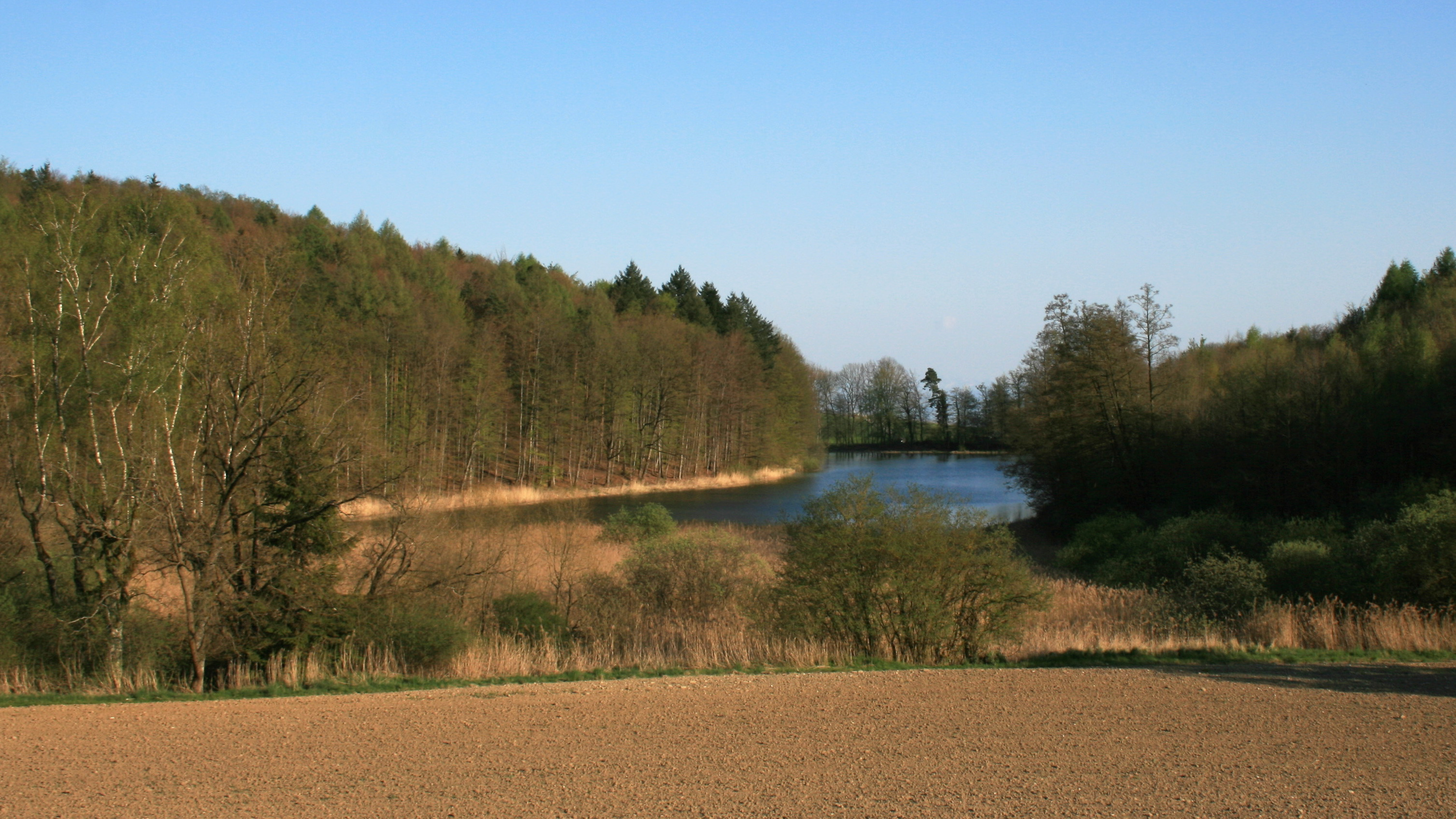
The little pond "Neuweiher" in springtime

In the east of the village lies pond Neuweiher. This is a hidden water supply in the middle of a lonely wood. According to an old document in the archives of the town of Meersburg ("Meersburger Stadtarchiv") this water storage was built in 1445. In medieval times it was used to flood the town moat of Meersburg. The pond has a surface of about 570 m^{2} and a maximal depth of 4,1 m. The pond contents are about 101 Mio. liter water. Nowadays the pond and its surroundings are used for recreation purposes. It is also used as static water storage for fire extinction in case of forest fire. It is not allowed to swim in the pond or go boating on it.

== Coat of arms ==
The arms represent the two most significant historical rulers of Daisendorf: the eagle the Free City of Überlingen; and the cross the Prince-Bishopric of Constance.

== Persons related to the village of Daisendorf ==
- Karel Liška (1914–1987): This Czech painter was teacher in the nearby town of Meersburg in the secondary school "Aufbau-Gymnasium". He painted in a natural style various landscapes around Lake Constance and sights of Daisendorf, Meersburg and Prague.
