= Grenzchopf =

Mountain in Switzerland

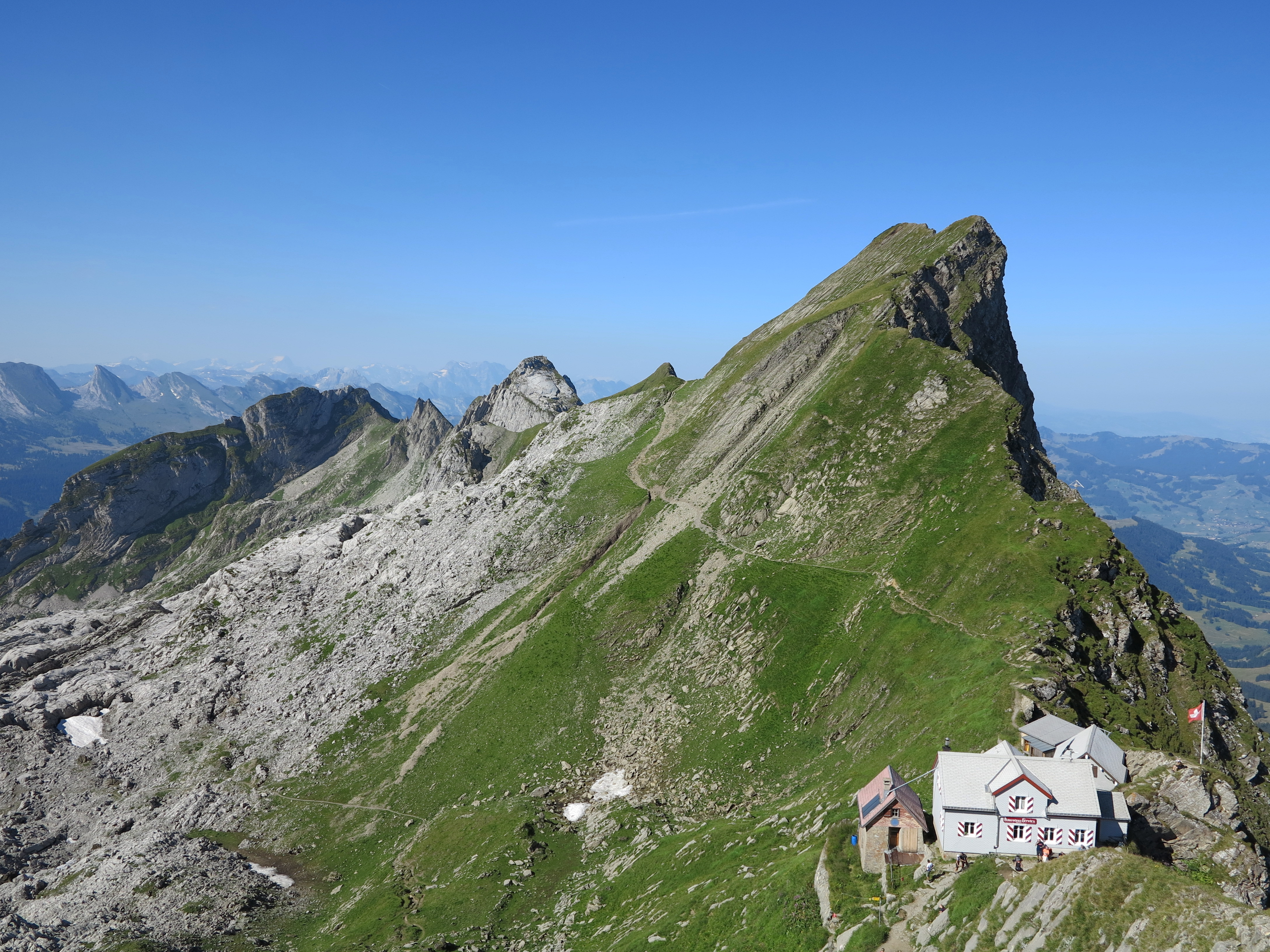

Highest point
- Elevation: 2,193 m (7,195 ft)
- Prominence: 108 m (354 ft)
- Parent peak: Säntis
- Coordinates: 47°14′49″N 9°19′25″E

Geography
- Location within Switzerland Location within Canton of Appenzell Ausserrhoden Location within Canton of St. Gallen
- Location: Appenzell Ausserrhoden/St. Gallen
- Country: Switzerland
- Parent range: Appenzell Alps

The Grenzchopf (2,193 m [7,195 ft]) is a mountain of the Appenzell Alps, overlooking the Schwägalp Pass on the border between the Swiss cantons of Appenzell Ausserrhoden and St. Gallen.

Located 2 kilometres (1.2 mi) west of the Säntis, the Grenzchopf is one of the highest summits of the canton of Appenzell Ausserrhoden. It is also its southernmost point of this canton.

== See also ==
- List of mountains of Appenzell Ausserrhoden
- List of mountains of the canton of St. Gallen
