= LIPC =

LIPC can refer to:

- Electrolaser (Laser-Induced Plasma Channel)
- LIPC gene encoding hepatic lipase
- The ICAO code for Cervia Air Force Base
