= Applied Energetics =

Applied Energetics, Inc. (formerly Ionatron) is an American arms manufacturer. It develops directed-energy weapons, mainly electrolasers with a range of tens of meters.

Applied Energetics stock is publicly traded on the NASDAQ exchange. When still named Ionatron, it traded under the ticker symbol IOTN. In February 2008, the company name was changed to Applied Energetics with ticker symbol AERG.
