= Ludger Wöste =

German laser physicist and educator (born 1946)

Ludger Wöste (born 2 May 1946 in Emsbüren) is a German physicist and professor at the Free University of Berlin. He is known for research in laser control of chemistry and laser-based weather control through the creation of plasma channels by laser filamentation in air.

== Education and career ==
Wöste studied physics and electrical engineering at the RWTH Aachen University from 1965, then physics at the University of Bonn from 1968. He completed his diploma under Herbert Walther in 1972, on the deflection of a sodium atom beam in the radiation field of a dye laser.

From 1973 to 1978 he worked as an assistant to Ernst Schumacher at the University of Bern, receiving his doctorate in 1978 for work on mass selective laser spectroscopy on metal atom clusters. He then spent time as a postdoc with Richard N. Zare at Stanford University until 1980, studying laser chemistry (reactions on optically oriented molecules).

From 1980 to 1987 he was a project manager (photodynamic behavior of metal clusters) and lecturer at the École polytechnique fédérale de Lausanne, serving as head of research for laser applications from 1981. In 1984, he was a visiting professor at the Aimé Cotton Laboratory of the University of Paris-Sud, where he studied the transition from non-conducting to conducting metal in mercury clusters.

From 1989 he was a professor at the Free University of Berlin, and from 2007 to 2008 he served as dean of the physics department. Since 2014 he has been Wilhelm and Else Heraeus Senior Professor for new teaching concepts in physics.

== Research ==
Wöste's research focuses on the applications of laser spectroscopy and laser chemistry, including the aspects of ultrafast spectroscopy, catalysis, clusters, optical remote sensing of the atmosphere, He's also known for developments in physics education - among other things he developed a construction kit for demonstration experiments at schools around mass spectrometry and the laser.

In the 2000s, along with his former PhD student Jean-Pierre Wolf, Wöste and colleagues constructed the world's first mobile terawatt laser system, Teramobile. The goal of the project is to induce rainfall through intense laser-induced filamentation in air.

== Honors and awards ==
Wöste received the Marian Smoluchowski and Emil Warburg Prize for Physics in 1999 and the Gay-Lussac-Humboldt Prize in 2006. In 2004, he was honorary professor at Nanjing University. In 2007, he became a knight of the Ordre national du Mérite.

Wöste holds honorary doctorates from the West University of Timișoara and the University of Lyon I. Wöste holds 13 patents and has over 320 scientific publications.

== Bibliography ==
- Manz, Jörn; Wöste, Ludger, eds. (1995). Femtosecond chemistry. Weinheim: VCH. ISBN 978-3-527-61943-6. OCLC 232611397.
- Kühn, Oliver; Wöste, Ludger, eds. (2007). Analysis and Control of Ultrafast Photoinduced Reactions. Chemical Physics. Vol. 87. Springer. doi:10.1007/978-3-540-68038-3. ISBN 978-3-540-68037-6.
