= Meersburg (Gemeindeverwaltungsverband) =

- Gemeindeverwaltungsverband
- Location of Meersburg within Bodenseekreis district
- Interactive map of Meersburg
- Location within Germany Location within Baden-Württemberg
- Coordinates: 47°42′N 9°16′E
- Country: Germany
- State: Baden-Württemberg
- Admin. region: Tübingen
- District: Bodenseekreis
- Seat: Meersburg
- Subdivisions: 5 municipalities

Area
  - Total: 37.41 km^{2} (14.44 sq mi)

Population (2025-12-31)
  - Total: 18,036
  - Density: 482.1/km^{2} (1,249/sq mi)
- Time zone: UTC+01:00 (CET)
  - Summer (DST): UTC+02:00 (CEST)

Meersburg is a Gemeindeverwaltungsverband in the district Bodenseekreis in Baden-Württemberg, Germany. The seat of the Gemeindeverwaltungsverband is in Meersburg.

It consists of the following municipalities:

1. Daisendorf
2. Hagnau am Bodensee
3. Meersburg
4. Stetten
5. Uhldingen-Mühlhofen
