= Säntis transmitter =

Coordinates: 47.2494°N 9.3427°E

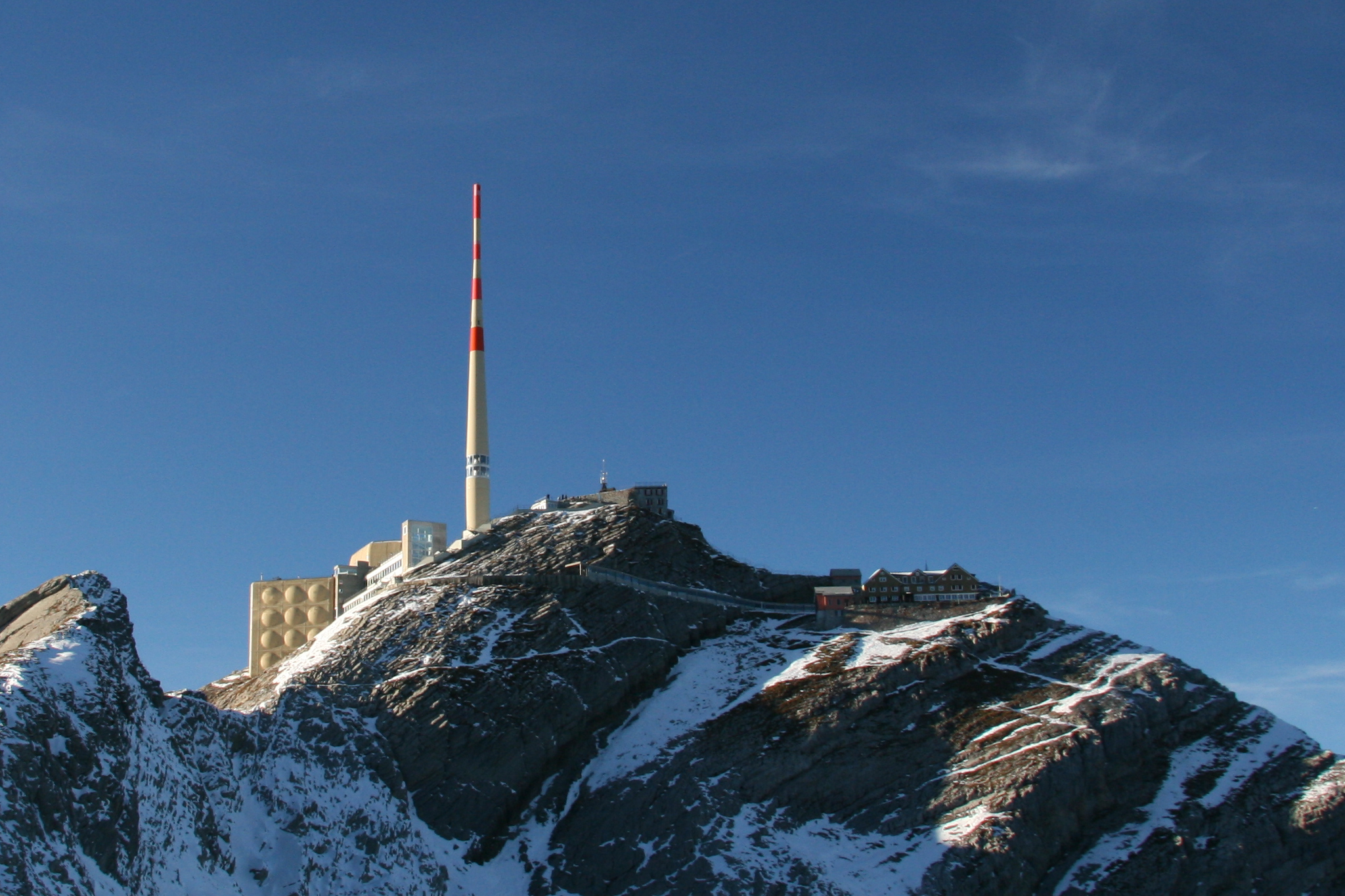
Säntis transmitter

The Säntis transmitter is a 123.5 m (405.3 ft) high transmitting station on the summit of the 2,502 m (8,209 ft) high Säntis mountain in Switzerland. It is operated by Swisscom.

The original microwave station (a barrack with wooden antenna trestles) was built in 1955, but because Säntis is directly exposed to north-western weather the unprotected microwave radio antennae regularly iced up in winter. It was therefore decided to rebuild the station and to shield the antennae with polyurethane panels. This gives the station its unique "look", the bubbles one can see on the left part of the photograph.

With over 100 strikes per year, the tower is considered to be amongst the constructs most frequently hit by lightnings.

== Coverage ==
Because of the extremely exposed location, signals from the Säntis transmitter cover not only Switzerland but reach far into the German mainland, as well as parts of Austria and the French Alsace region. During the times of analog television, it was usual to watch Swiss television with a roof antenna even in the far away cities of Stuttgart and Munich.

== Channels ==
- Analog radio
  - DRS 1 - 101.5 MHz (60 kW)
  - DRS 2 - 95.4 MHz (60 kW)
  - DRS 3 - 105.6 MHz (60 kW)
  - RSR La Première - 99.9 MHz (60 kW)
  - Rete Uno - 107.8 MHz (60 kW)
- Digital radio
  - 12C - SRG SSR radio bouquet (German)
- Digital television (DVB-T)
  - UHF 34 - SRG SSR TV bouquet (German) (41.7 kW)
