= Stetten, Bodenseekreis =

Stetten
- Municipality
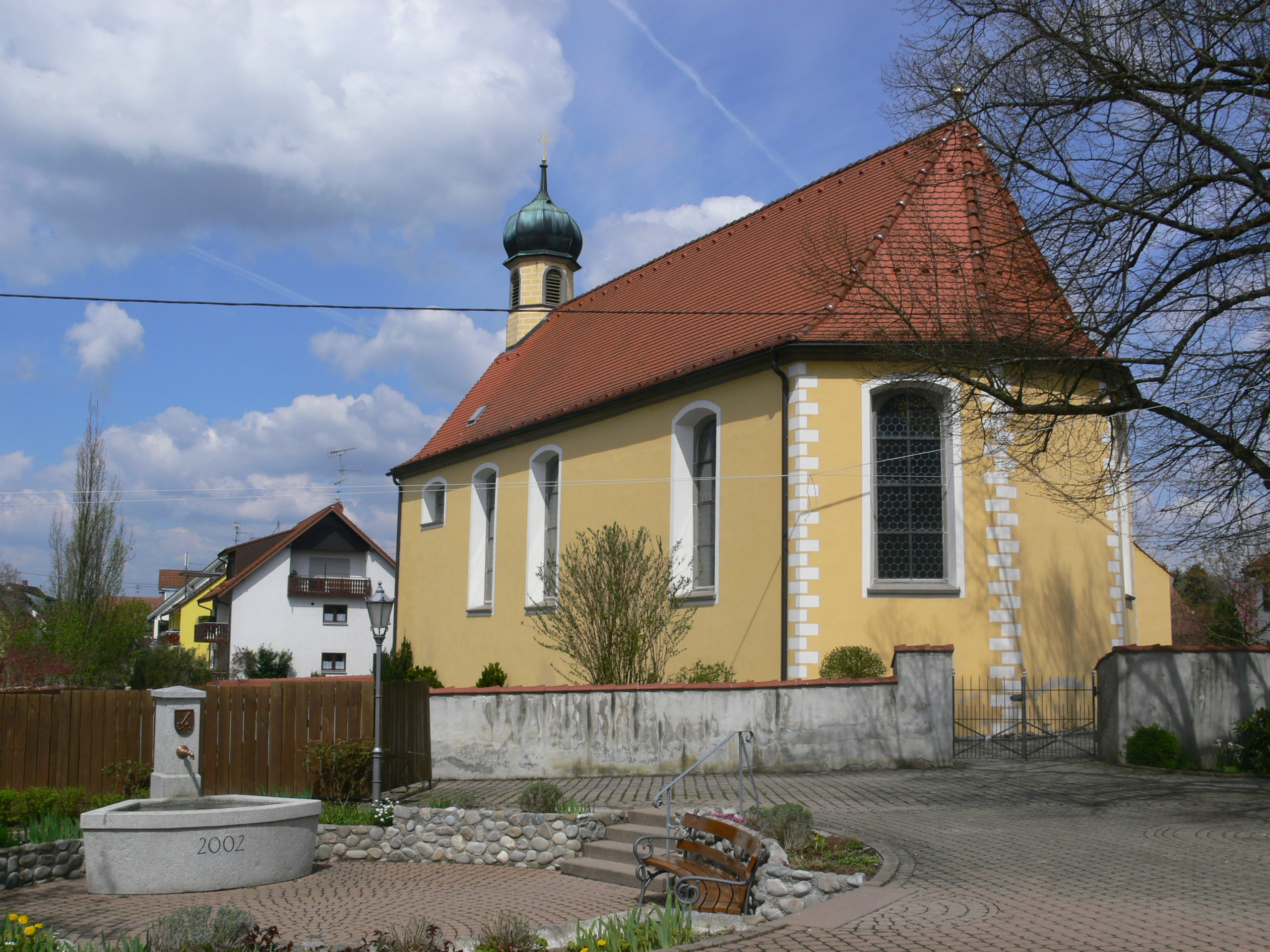
- Chapel of Saints Peter and Paul

- Coat of arms

- Location of Stetten within Bodenseekreis district
- Interactive map of Stetten
- Location within Germany Location within Baden-Württemberg
- Coordinates: 47°41′30″N 09°18′00″E
- Country: Germany
- State: Baden-Württemberg
- Admin. region: Tübingen
- District: Bodenseekreis
- Municipal assoc.: Meersburg

Government
  - Mayor (2016–24): Daniel Heß (CDU)

Area
  - Total: 4.3 km^{2} (1.7 sq mi)
- Elevation: 470 m (1,540 ft)

Population (2025-12-31)
  - Total: 984
  - Density: 230/km^{2} (590/sq mi)
- Time zone: UTC+01:00 (CET)
  - Summer (DST): UTC+02:00 (CEST)
- Postal codes: 88719
- Dialling codes: 07532
- Vehicle registration: FN
- Website: www.gemeinde-stetten.de

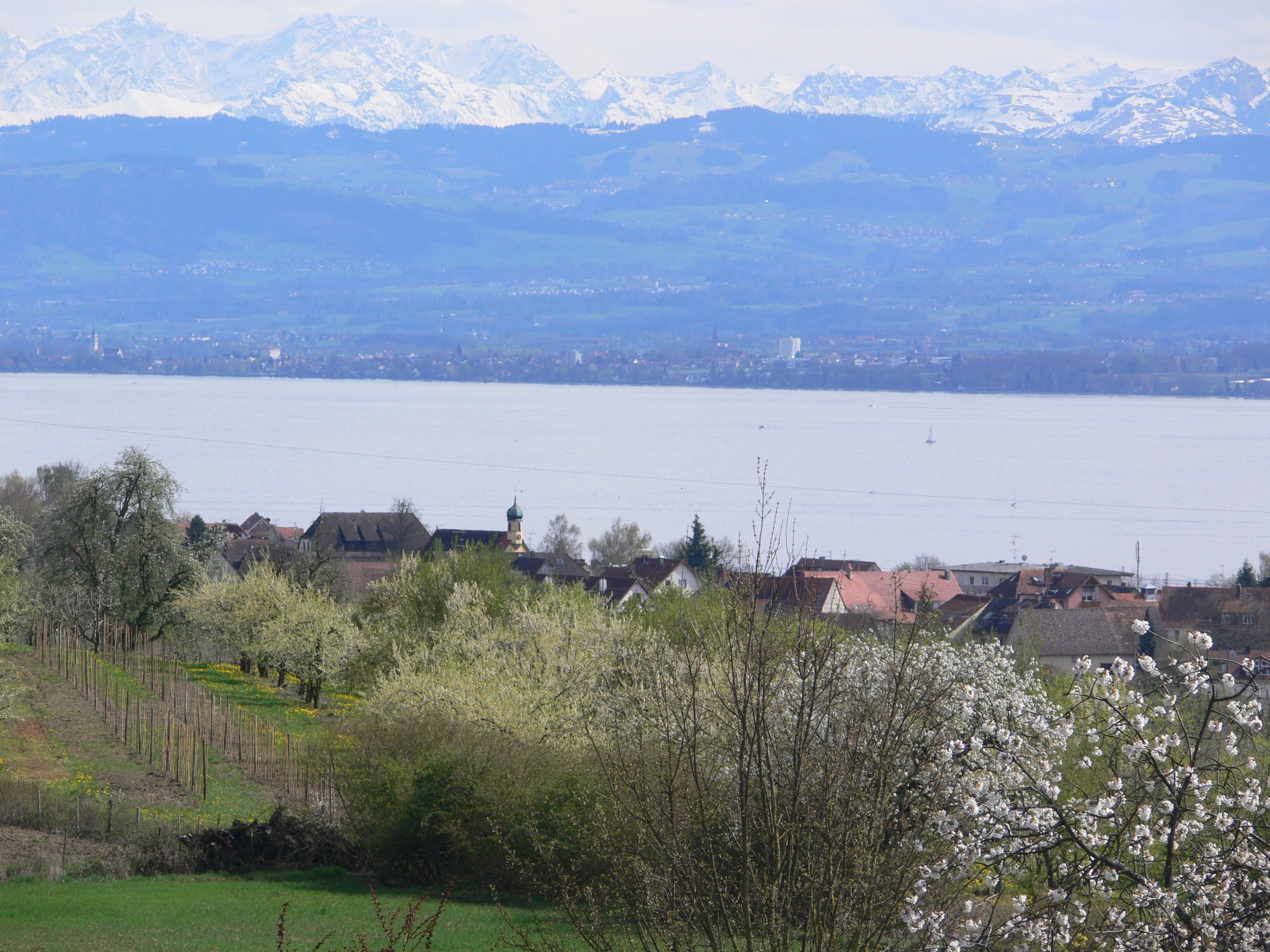
View over Stetten and the Bodensee, in the Background the Swiss Alps

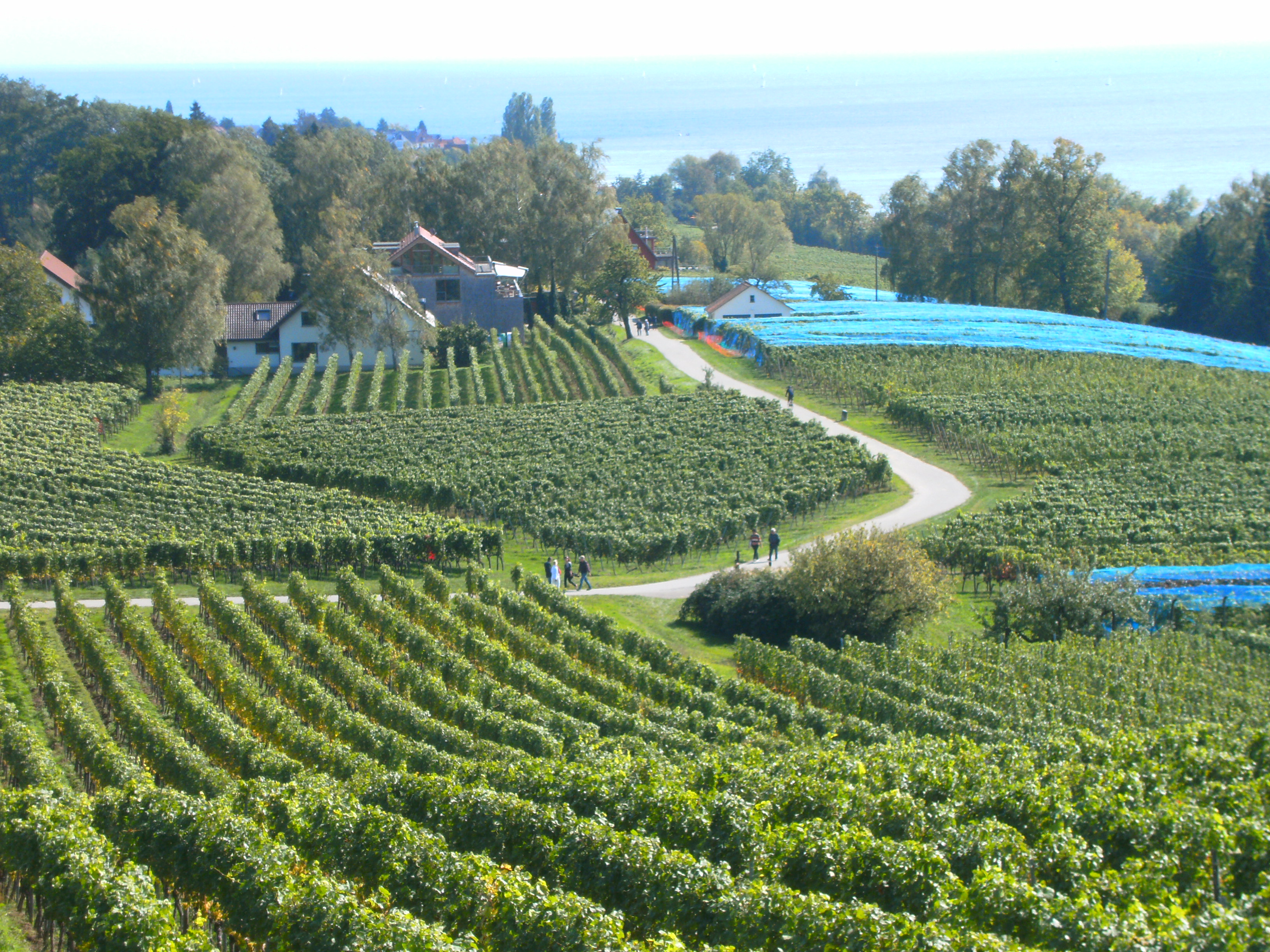
View from German war cemetery Meersburg-Lerchenberg, Germany, to wineyard Aufricht and the part of Stetten at the shore of Bodensee

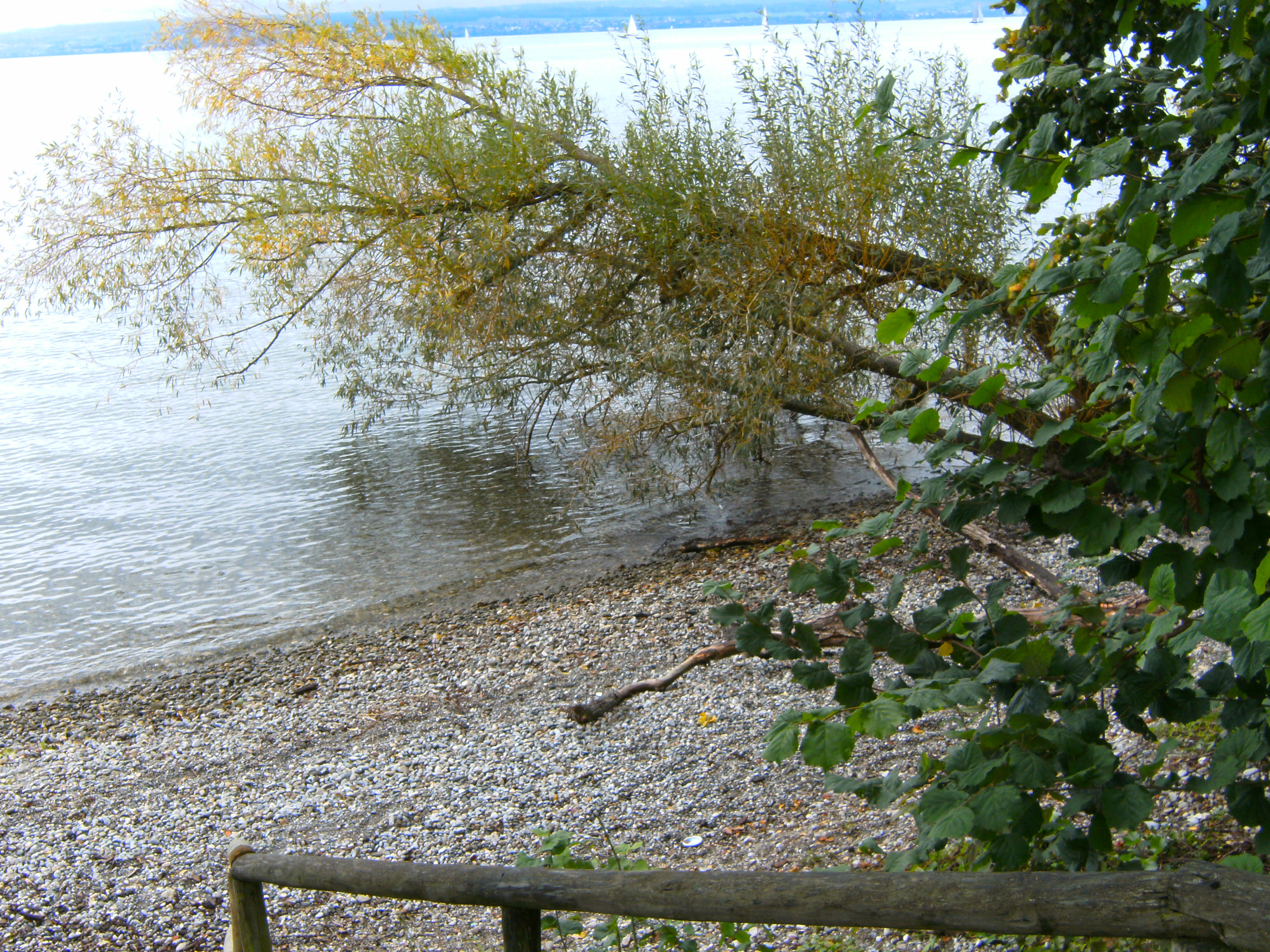
Natural beach of Lake Constance of the village of Stetten (Bodenseekreis) at the path from Meersburg to Hagnau

Stetten (German pronunciation: [ˈʃtɛtn̩]) is a municipality in the district of Bodensee in Baden-Württemberg in Germany.
