= Hundwil =

- Municipality
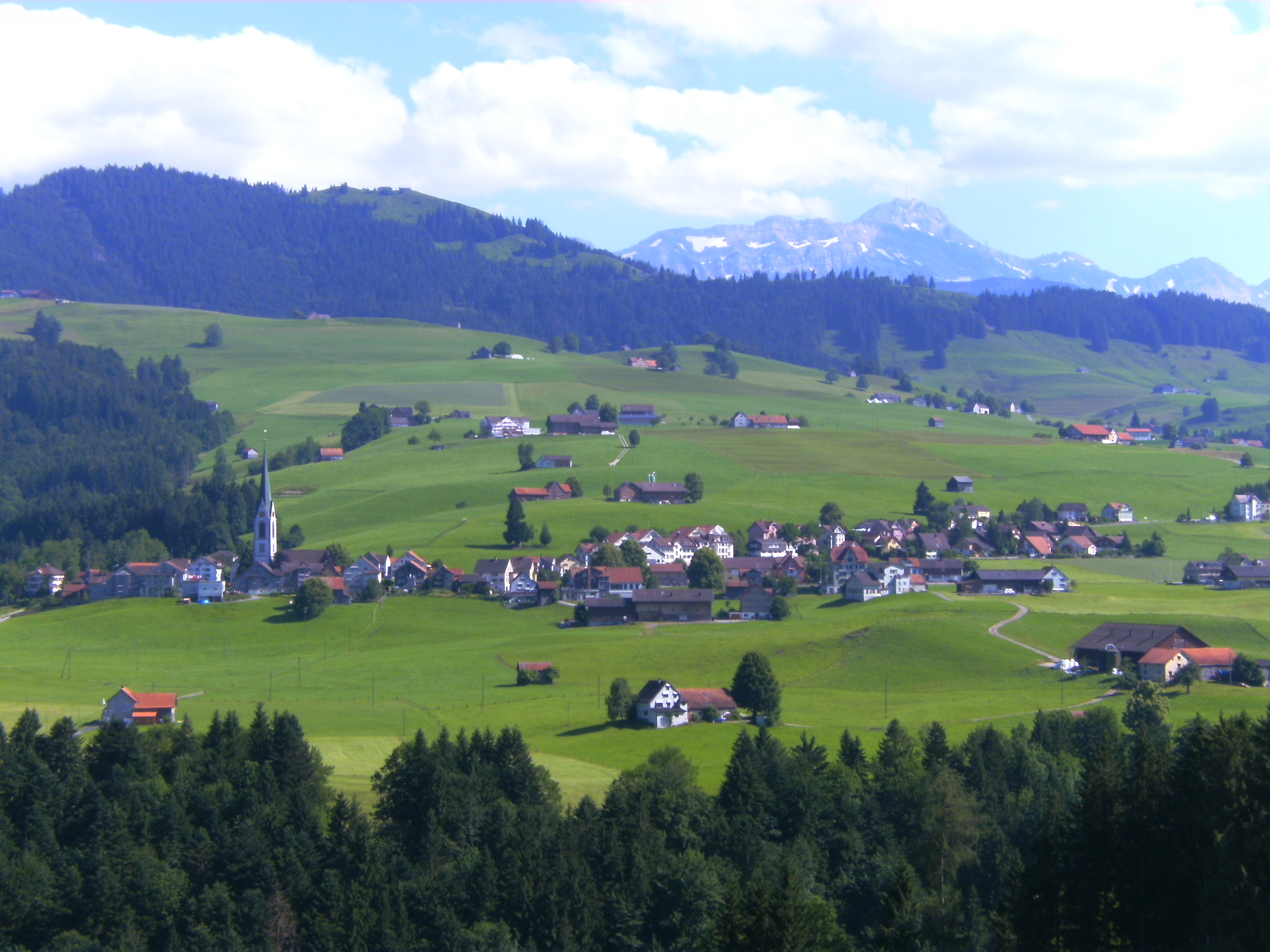

- Flag Coat of arms
- Location of Hundwil
- Location within Switzerland Location within Canton of Appenzell Ausserrhoden
- Coordinates: 47°22′N 9°19′E
- Country: Switzerland
- Canton: Appenzell Ausserrhoden
- District: n.a.

Area
  - Total: 23.94 km^{2} (9.24 sq mi)
- Elevation: 791 m (2,595 ft)

Population (December 2008)
  - Total: 994
  - Density: 41.5/km^{2} (108/sq mi)
- Time zone: UTC+01:00 (CET)
  - Summer (DST): UTC+02:00 (CEST)
- Postal code: 9064
- SFOS number: 3002
- ISO 3166 code: CH-AR
- Surrounded by: Gonten (AI), Herisau, Nesslau-Krummenau (SG), Schlatt-Haslen (AI), Schwende (AI), Stein, Urnäsch, Waldstatt, Wildhaus (SG)
- Website: www.hundwil.ch

Hundwil is a municipality in the canton of Appenzell Ausserrhoden in Switzerland.

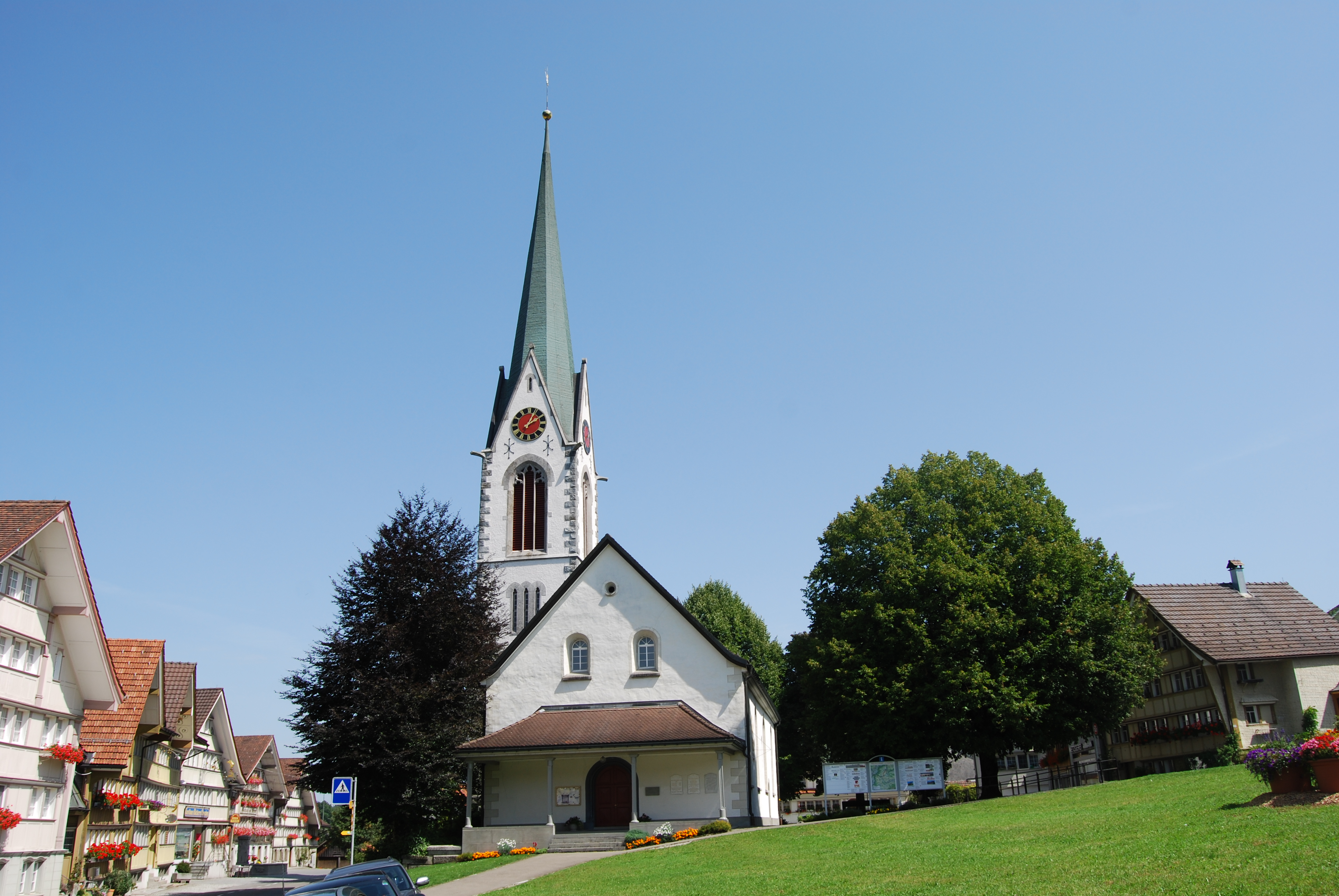
Hundwil

== History ==
Hundwil is first mentioned in 921 as Huntwilare.

== Geography ==
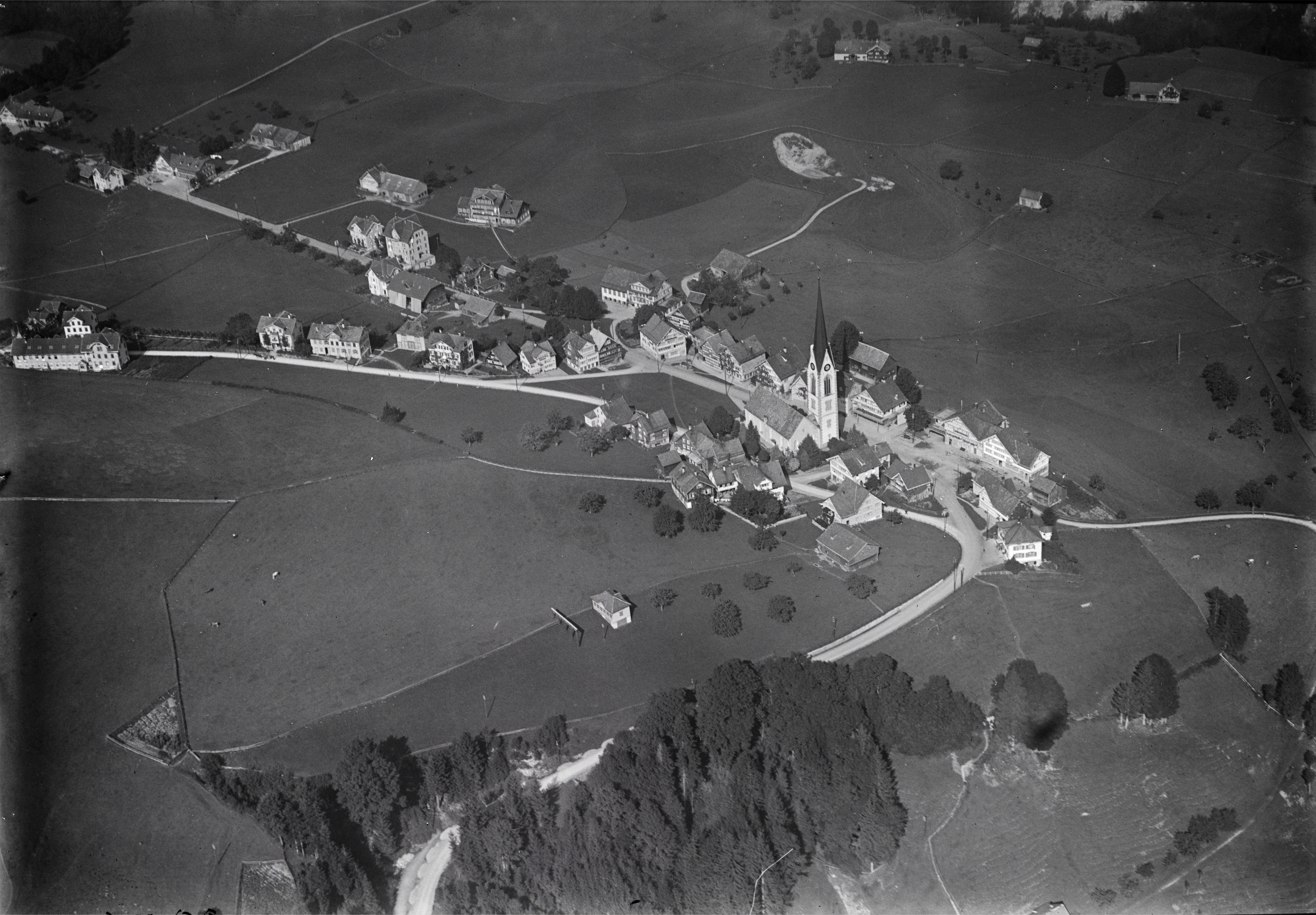
Aerial view from 300 m by Walter Mittelholzer (1923)

Hundwil has an area, as of 2006, of 24.1 km^{2} (9.3 sq mi). Of this area, 58.5% is used for agricultural purposes, while 31.2% is forested. Of the rest of the land, 3.2% is settled (buildings or roads) and the remainder (7.1%) is non-productive (rivers, glaciers or mountains).

Hundwil was a capital of the former district Hinterland. It lies on the road between Herisau and Appenzell. The Landsgemeinde square and the Kronenplatz, as well as the Protestant church are listed as heritage sites of national significance. It consists of the village of Hundwil, a number of hamlets, numerous individual farm houses and alpine herding camps. Until 1749, the municipality of Stein was part of Hundwil.

The Hundwiler Höhi is a recreational destination at 1,305 meters (4,281 ft). The most well-known and highest mountain in the area is Säntis (2,502 m (8,209 ft)), which is shared with neighbouring municipalities. The Schwägalp valley station also belongs to the extended municipality.

== Demographics ==
Hundwil has a population (as of 2008) of 994, of which about 4.9% are foreign nationals. Over the last 10 years the population has decreased at a rate of -5.6%. Most of the population (as of 2000) speaks German (97.2%), with Serbo-Croatian being second most common ( 1.3%) and Portuguese being third ( 0.5%).

As of 2000, the gender distribution of the population was 52.2% male and 47.8% female. The age distribution, as of 2000, in Hundwil is; 114 people or 11.0% of the population are between 0–6 years old. 156 people or 15.0% are 6–15, and 68 people or 6.6% are 16–19. Of the adult population, 57 people or 5.5% of the population are between 20 and 24 years old. 275 people or 26.5% are 25–44, and 212 people or 20.4% are 45–64. The senior population distribution is 99 people or 9.5% of the population are between 65 and 79 years old, and 57 people or 5.5% are over 80.

In the 2007 federal election the FDP received 60.9% of the vote.

The entire Swiss population is generally well educated. In Hundwil about 60% of the population (between age 25–64) have completed either non-mandatory upper secondary education or additional higher education (either university or a Fachhochschule).

Hundwil has an unemployment rate of 0.55%. As of 2005, there were 168 people employed in the primary economic sector and about 69 businesses involved in this sector. 64 people are employed in the secondary sector and there are 10 businesses in this sector. 196 people are employed in the tertiary sector, with 40 businesses in this sector.

The historical population is given in the following table:

Historical population
| Year | Pop. | ±% |
|---|---|---|
| 1667 | 1,845 | — |
| 1734 | 3,360 | +82.1% |
| 1794 | 1,910 | −43.2% |
| 1850 | 1,500 | −21.5% |
| 1900 | 1,523 | +1.5% |
| 1950 | 1,290 | −15.3% |
| 1980 | 943 | −26.9% |
| 1990 | 1,035 | +9.8% |
| 2000 | 1,030 | −0.5% |
| 2005 | 997 | −3.2% |
| 2007 | 983 | −1.4% |
