= Electrolaser =

Electroshock weapon

An electrolaser is a type of electroshock weapon that is also a directed-energy weapon. It uses lasers to form an electrically conductive laser-induced plasma channel (LIPC). A fraction of a second later, a powerful electric current is sent down this plasma channel and delivered to the target, thus functioning overall as a large-scale, high energy, long-distance version of the Taser electroshock gun.

Alternating current is sent through a series of step-up transformers, increasing the voltage and decreasing the current. The final voltage may be between 10^{8} and 10^{9} volts. This current is fed into the plasma channel created by the laser beam.

== Laser-induced plasma channel ==
A laser-induced plasma channel (LIPC) is formed by the following process:

- A laser emits a laser beam into the air.
- The laser beam rapidly heats and ionizes surrounding gases to form plasma.
- The plasma forms an electrically conductive plasma channel.

Because a laser-induced plasma channel relies on ionization, gas must exist between the electrolaser weapon and its target. If a laser-beam is intense enough, its electromagnetic field is strong enough to rip electrons off of air molecules, or whatever gas happens to be in between, creating plasma. Similar to lightning, the rapid heating also creates a sonic boom.

== Uses ==
Methods of use:

- To kill or incapacitate a living target through electric shock.
- To seriously damage, disable, or destroy any electric or electronic devices in the target.
- As electrolasers and natural lightning both use plasma channels to conduct electric current, an electrolaser can set up a light-induced plasma channel for uses such as:
  - To study lightning
  - During a thunderstorm, to make lightning discharge at a safe time and place, as with a lightning conductor.
  - Directing atmospheric lightning to a terrestrial collection station for the purpose of electrical power generation.
  - As a weapon, to make a thunderhead deliver a precise lightning strike onto a target from an aircraft; in this case, the aircraft and laser can be compared to a triggered spark gap, in that the relatively minor amount of initial input from the laser allows a large amount of energy to flow between the cloud and the ground.

Because of the plasma channel, an electrolaser may cause an accident if there is a thunderstorm (or other electricity sources such as overhead powerlines) about. (See Taser for more information – principles of operation, controversies, etc.)

An electrolaser is not presently practical for wireless energy transfer due to danger and low efficiency.

== Examples of electrolasers ==
=== Applied Energetics ===
Applied Energetics (formerly Ionatron) develops directed-energy weapons for the United States military. The company has produced a device called the Joint IED Neutralizer (JIN), which was intended for safely detonating improvised explosive devices (IEDs). The device was deemed unsuitable for field use in 2006, however, the company has been developing versions of the weapon that can be mounted on land, air, and sea vehicles, as well as a hand-held infantry version.

Applied Energetics said that the weapons will be able to be used as a non-lethal alternative to current weaponry, but will be able to deliver a high enough voltage jolt to kill.

Applied Energetics say that they are working on an electrolaser system, called LGE (Laser Guided Energy). They are also studying a laser-induced plasma channel (LIPC) as a way to stop people from going through a corridor or passageway.

=== Phoenix ===
There was an unconfirmed report that in 1985 the U.S. Navy tested an electrolaser. Its targets were missiles and aircraft. This device was known as the Phoenix project within the Strategic Defense Initiative research program. It was first proved by experiment at long range in 1985, but this report may have referred to an early test of MIRACL, which is or was a high-powered chemical laser.

=== HSV Technologies ===
HSV Technologies, Inc. (Stood for the last names of the original founders, Herr, Schlesinger and Vernon; this is NOT the same company as Holden Special Vehicles), formerly of San Diego, California, US, then Port Orchard, Washington, designed a non-lethal device which was profiled in the 2002 Time magazine article "Beyond the Rubber Bullet". It is an electrolaser using ultraviolet laser beams of 193 nm, and promises to immobilize living targets at a distance without contact. There were plans for an engine-disabling variation for use against the electronic ignitions of cars using a 248 nm laser. The lead inventor, Eric Herr, died in 2008 and the company appears to have been dissolved, as their website now hosts an unrelated business (as of September 2015).

=== Picatinny Arsenal ===
Scientists and engineers from Picatinny Arsenal have demonstrated that an electric discharge can go through a laser beam. The laser beam is self-focusing due to the high laser intensity of 50 gigawatts, which changes the speed of light in air. The laser was reportedly successfully tested in January 2012.

== Similar devices ==
There have been experiments in using a laser beam as path to discharge natural electric charges in the air, causing "laser-triggered lightning".

== See also ==
- List of laser articles
