= Hundwiler Höhi =

Mountain in Switzerland

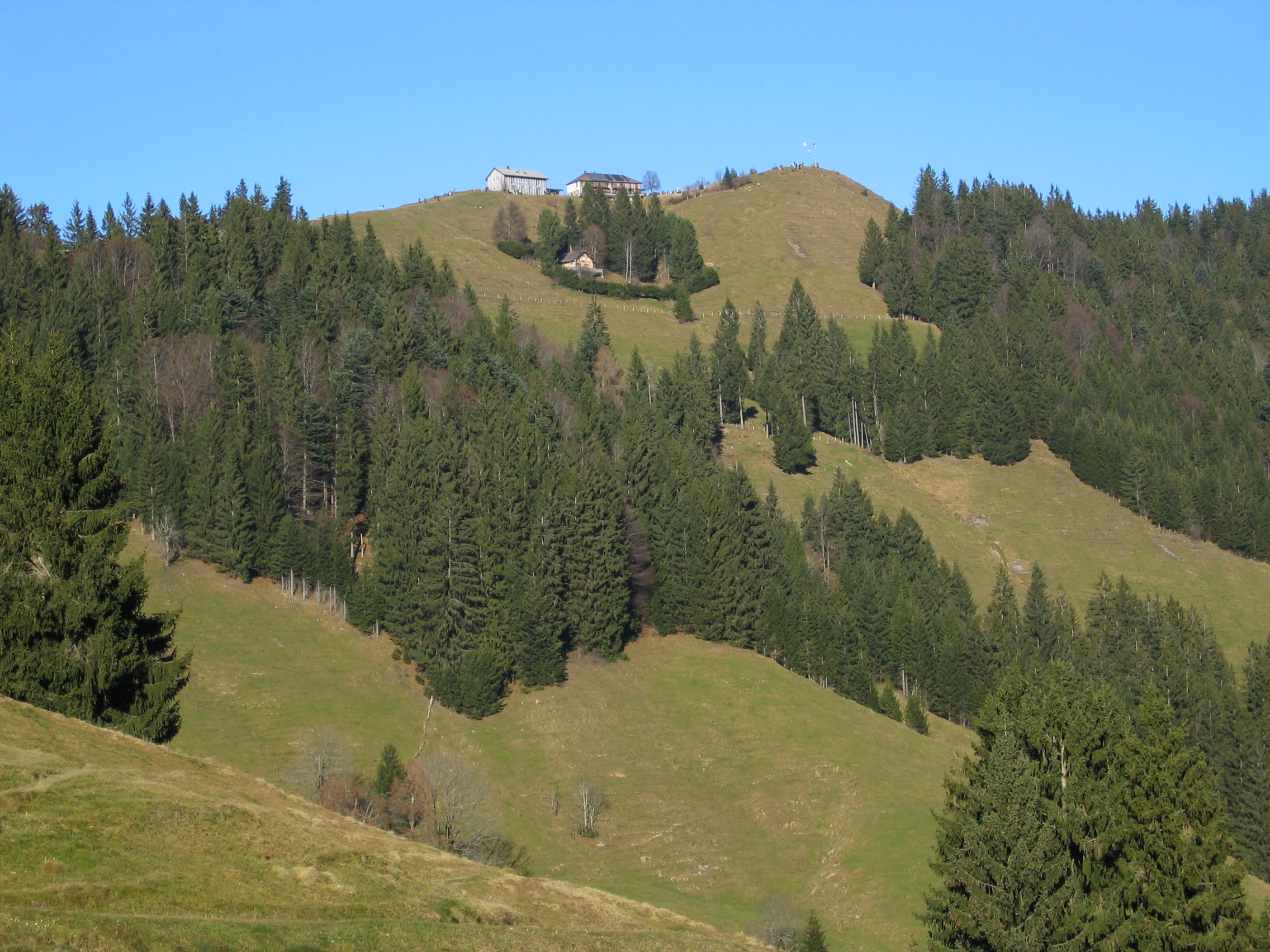
- View from the south side

Highest point
- Elevation: 1,306 m (4,285 ft)
- Prominence: 406 m (1,332 ft)
- Parent peak: Säntis
- Coordinates: 47°20′27″N 9°20′00″E

Geography
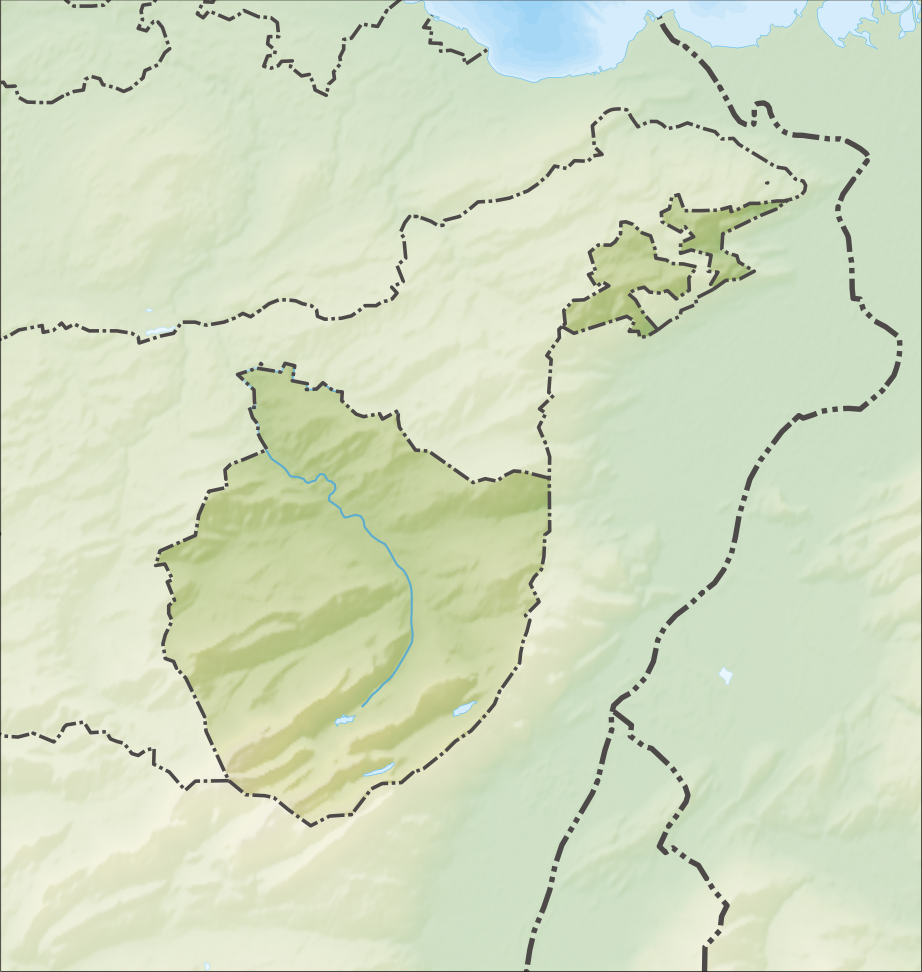
- Location within Switzerland Location within Canton of Appenzell Ausserrhoden Location within Canton of Appenzell Innerrhoden
- Location: Appenzell Ausserrhoden/Appenzell Innerrhoden
- Country: Switzerland
- Parent range: Appenzell Alps

The Hundwiler Höhi (1,306 m [4,285 ft]) is a mountain of the Appenzell Alps, located on the border between the Swiss cantons of Appenzell Ausserrhoden (AR) and Appenzell Innerrhoden (AI). It is situated between the municipality of Hundwil (AR) and the district of Gonten (AI).

The summit is easily accessible from every side of the mountain and is a popular vantage point over the Säntis, the Alpstein massif and Lake Constance. A mountain hut is located near the top.

== See also ==
- List of mountains of Appenzell Ausserrhoden
- List of mountains of Appenzell Innerrhoden
