= Schlatt-Haslen =

Schlatt-Haslen District Bezirk Schlatt-Haslen
- District
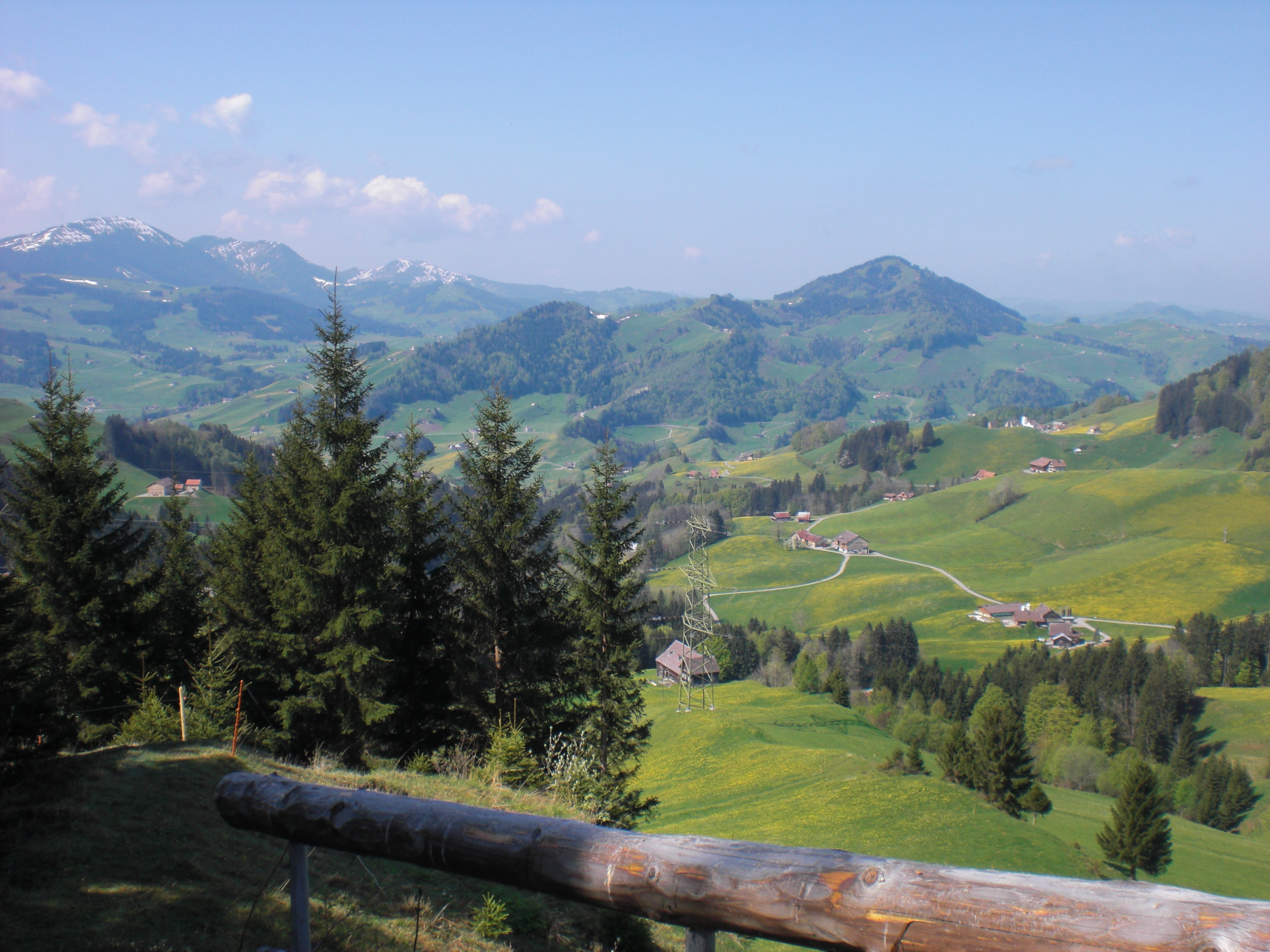

- Flag Coat of arms
- Coordinates: 47°22′N 9°22′E
- Country: Switzerland
- Canton: Appenzell Innerrhoden

Area
  - Total: 17.9 km^{2} (6.9 sq mi)
- Elevation: 740 m (2,430 ft)

Population (December 2020)
  - Total: 1,126
  - Density: 62.9/km^{2} (163/sq mi)
- Time zone: UTC+1 (CET)
  - Summer (DST): UTC+2 (CEST)
- Postal code: 9054
- SFOS number: 3104
- Municipalities: Appenzell Innerrhoden has no municipalities
- Website: http://www.schlatt-haslen.ch

Schlatt-Haslen District is a district of the canton of Appenzell Innerrhoden in Switzerland. It was formally established in 1872 from the rhode Schlatt and the village Haslen.

== Name ==
Slatte either refers to hollow or slope, to the local dialect word schlatt which means hitting. The name of the village Haslen goes back to Haslowe which means a pasture with hazelnut trees.

== History ==
Schlatt is first mentioned in 1200 as Slatte. In the 13th century, Haslen was mentioned as Haslowe.

== Geography ==
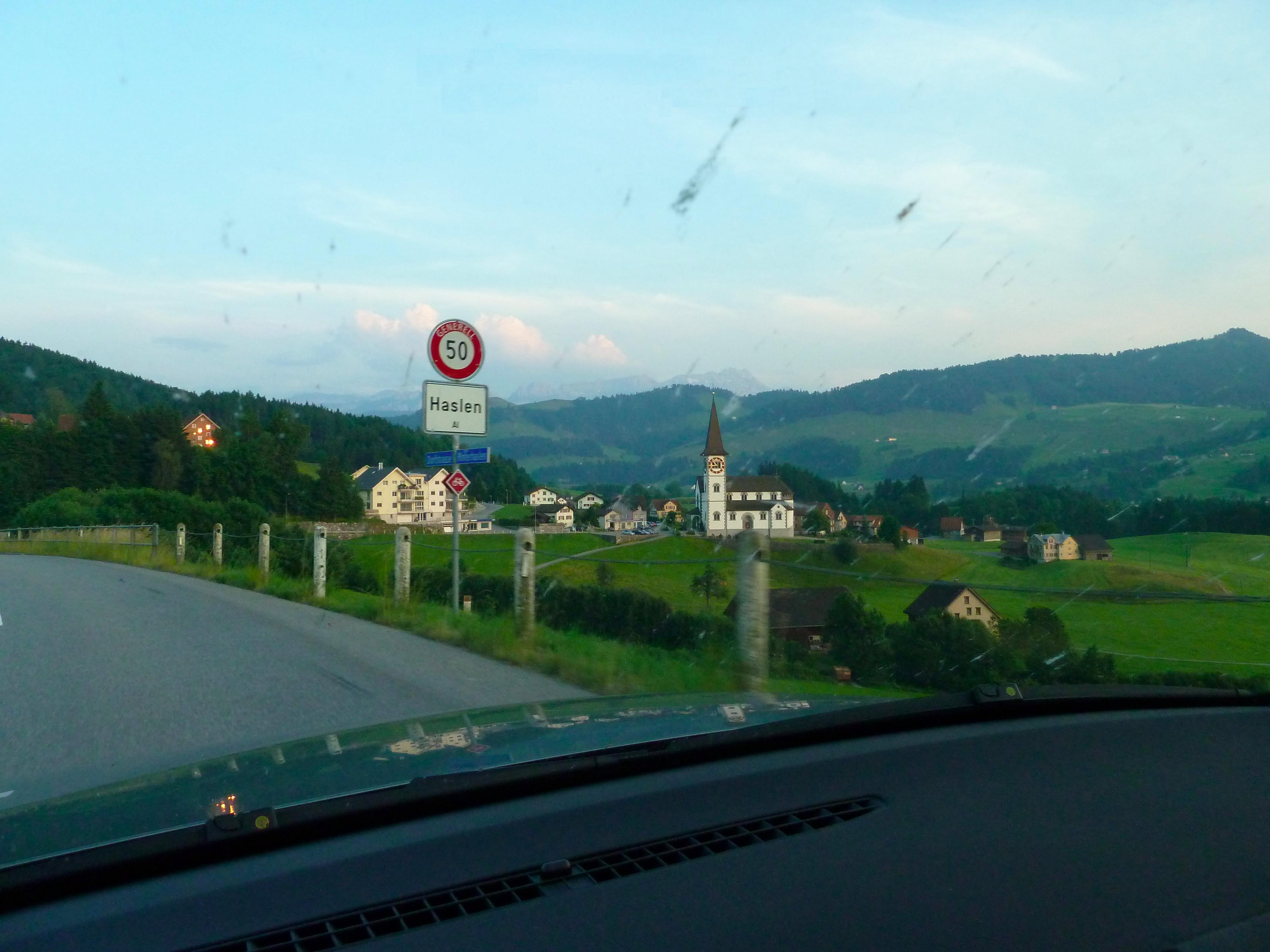
Haslen village

Aerial view from 500 m by Walter Mittelholzer (1923)

Schlatt-Haslen has an area, as of 2011, of 17.9 square kilometers (6.9 sq mi). Of this area, 64.7% is used for agricultural purposes, while 30.4% is forested. Of the rest of the land, 4.3% is settled (buildings or roads) and 0.6% is unproductive land.

The district runs between the Hundwiler Höhe and Rotbach mountains. It consists of the village of Haslen and the hamlets of Schlatt and Enggenhütten and numerous individual farm houses. Since 1877 the nunnery at Wonnenstein, near Teufen, Appenzell Ausserrhoden, has been an exclave of the distinct.

== Coat of arms ==
The blazon of the municipal coat of arms is Or a Halberd Argent handled of the first on a Bend Gules.

The coat of arms shows a silver halberd with a golden handle. The halberd is placed on a red diagonal beam, itself placed on a golden background. It is not clear why this hitting weapon is included in the coat of arms, but the name of the village is thought to go back to the word hitting.

== Demographics ==
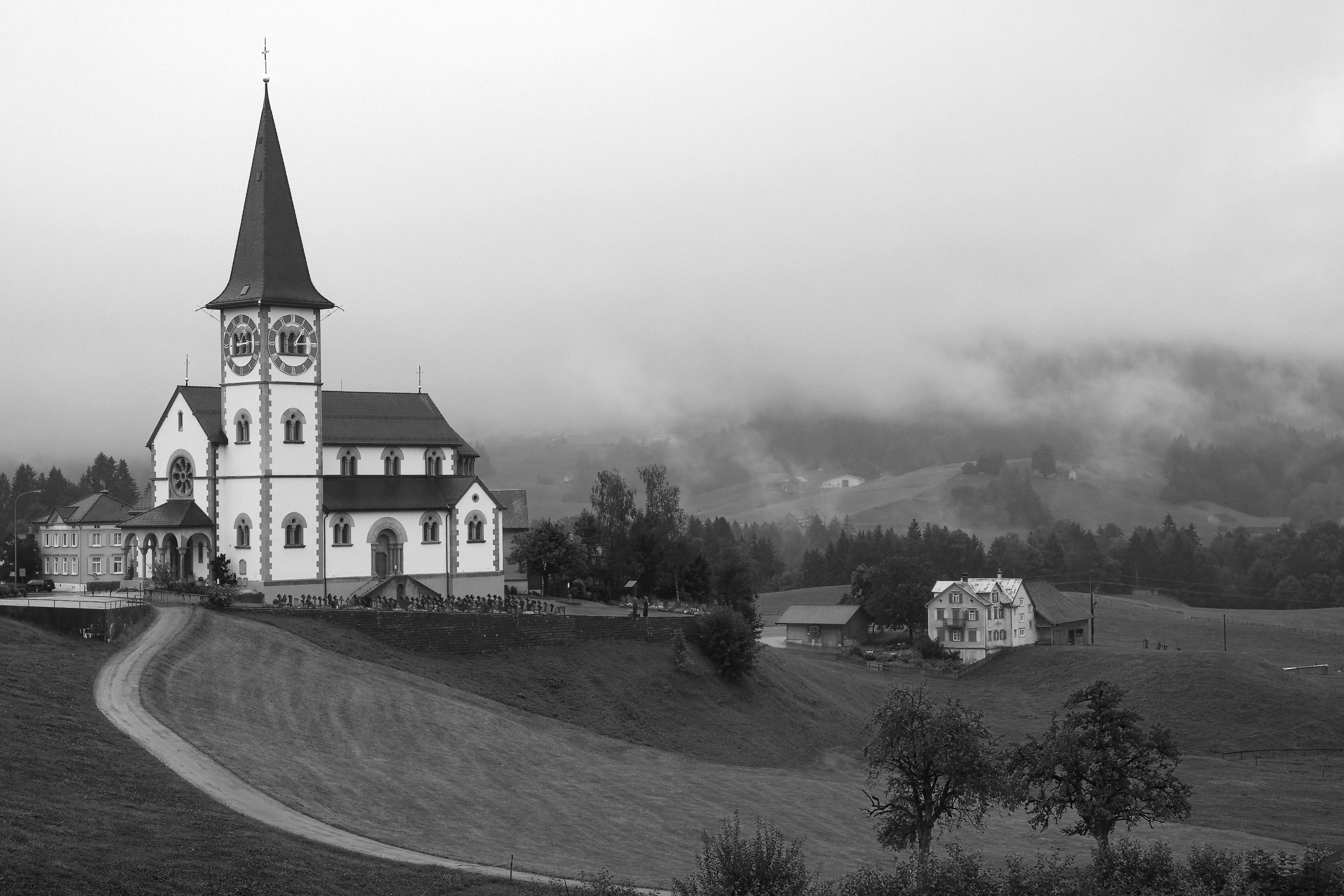
Haslen village church in 1901

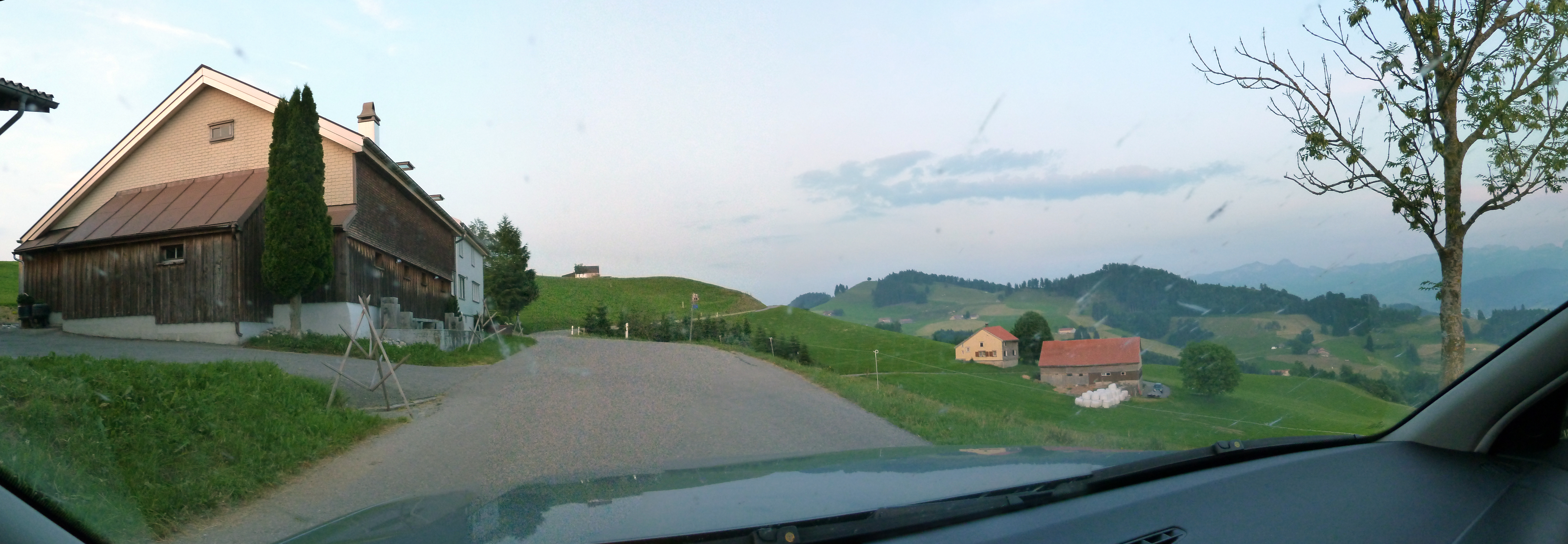
Houses along Leimensteig near Schlatt

Schlatt-Haslen has a population (as of December 2020) of 1,126. As of 2008, 3.2% of the population are resident foreign nationals. Over the last 10 years (1999–2009 ) the population has changed at a rate of -6.3%. It has changed at a rate of -5.2% due to migration and at a rate of -0.2% due to births and deaths.

Most of the population (as of 2000) speaks German (1,115 or 97.3%), with Albanian being second most common (13 or 1.1%) and Turkish being third (6 or 0.5%). There are 5 people who speak French.

Of the population in the district 719 or about 62.7% were born in Schlatt-Haslen and lived there in 2000. There were 113 or 9.9% who were born in the same canton, while 250 or 21.8% were born somewhere else in Switzerland, and 49 or 4.3% were born outside of Switzerland.

In 2008 there were no live births to or deaths of Swiss citizens. Ignoring immigration and emigration, the population of Swiss citizens remained the same while the foreign population remained the same. There was 1 Swiss man who emigrated from Switzerland and 4 Swiss women who immigrated back to Switzerland. At the same time, there was 1 non-Swiss man and 2 non-Swiss women who immigrated from another country to Switzerland. The total Swiss population change in 2008 (from all sources, including moves across municipal borders) was a decrease of 1 and the non-Swiss population increased by 6 people. This represents a population growth rate of 0.4%.

As of 2000, there were 607 people who were single and never married in the district. There were 483 married individuals, 42 widows or widowers and 14 individuals who are divorced.

As of 2000 the average number of residents per living room was 0.66 which is more people per room than the cantonal average of 0.59 per room. In this case, a room is defined as space of a housing unit of at least 4 m^{2} (43 sq ft) as normal bedrooms, dining rooms, living rooms, kitchens and habitable cellars and attics. About 70.3% of the total households were owner occupied, or in other words did not pay rent (though they may have a mortgage or a rent-to-own agreement).

As of 2000, there were 356 private households in the district, and an average of 3.2 persons per household. There were 77 households that consist of only one person and 98 households with five or more people. Out of a total of 360 households that answered this question, 21.4% were households made up of just one person and there were 10 adults who lived with their parents. Of the rest of the households, there are 68 married couples without children, 178 married couples with children There were 9 single parents with a child or children. There were 14 households that were made up of unrelated people and 4 households that were made up of some sort of institution or another collective housing.

In 2000 there were 116 single family homes (or 32.7% of the total) out of a total of 355 inhabited buildings. There were 23 multi-family buildings (6.5%), along with 196 multi-purpose buildings that were mostly used for housing (55.2%) and 20 other use buildings (commercial or industrial) that also had some housing (5.6%). Of the single family homes 53 were built before 1919, while 8 were built between 1990 and 2000.

In 2000 there were 407 apartments in the district. The most common apartment size was 4 rooms of which there were 111. There were 8 single room apartments and 215 apartments with five or more rooms. Of these apartments, a total of 344 apartments (84.5% of the total) were permanently occupied, while 50 apartments (12.3%) were seasonally occupied and 13 apartments (3.2%) were empty. As of 2009, the construction rate of new housing units was 2.6 new units per 1000 residents. The vacancy rate for the district, in 2010, was 2.04%.

The historical population is given in the following chart:

== Heritage sites of national significance ==
The Farm House Ulrichlis is listed as a Swiss heritage site of national significance. The entire village of Schlatt is part of the Inventory of Swiss Heritage Sites.

== Politics ==
In the 2007 federal election the CVP received 83.02% of the vote. In the federal election, a total of 176 votes were cast, and the voter turnout was 21.2%.

== Economy ==
As of 2010, Schlatt-Haslen had an unemployment rate of 0%. As of 2008, there were 239 people employed in the primary economic sector and about 113 businesses involved in this sector. 54 people were employed in the secondary sector and there were 14 businesses in this sector. 62 people were employed in the tertiary sector, with 24 businesses in this sector. There were 577 residents of the district who were employed in some capacity, of which females made up 40.9% of the workforce.

In 2008 the total number of full-time equivalent jobs was 256. The number of jobs in the primary sector was 162, of which 152 were in agriculture and 9 were in forestry or lumber production. The number of jobs in the secondary sector was 45 of which 29 or (64.4%) were in manufacturing and 16 (35.6%) were in construction. The number of jobs in the tertiary sector was 49. In the tertiary sector; 10 or 20.4% were in the sale or repair of motor vehicles, 1 was in the movement and storage of goods, 10 or 20.4% were in a hotel or restaurant, 7 or 14.3% were in the information industry, 2 or 4.1% were the insurance or financial industry, 9 or 18.4% were technical professionals or scientists, 9 or 18.4% were in education.

In 2000, there were 40 workers who commuted into the district and 306 workers who commuted away. The district is a net exporter of workers, with about 7.7 workers leaving the district for every one entering. Of the working population, 6.2% used public transportation to get to work, and 47% used a private car.

== Religion ==
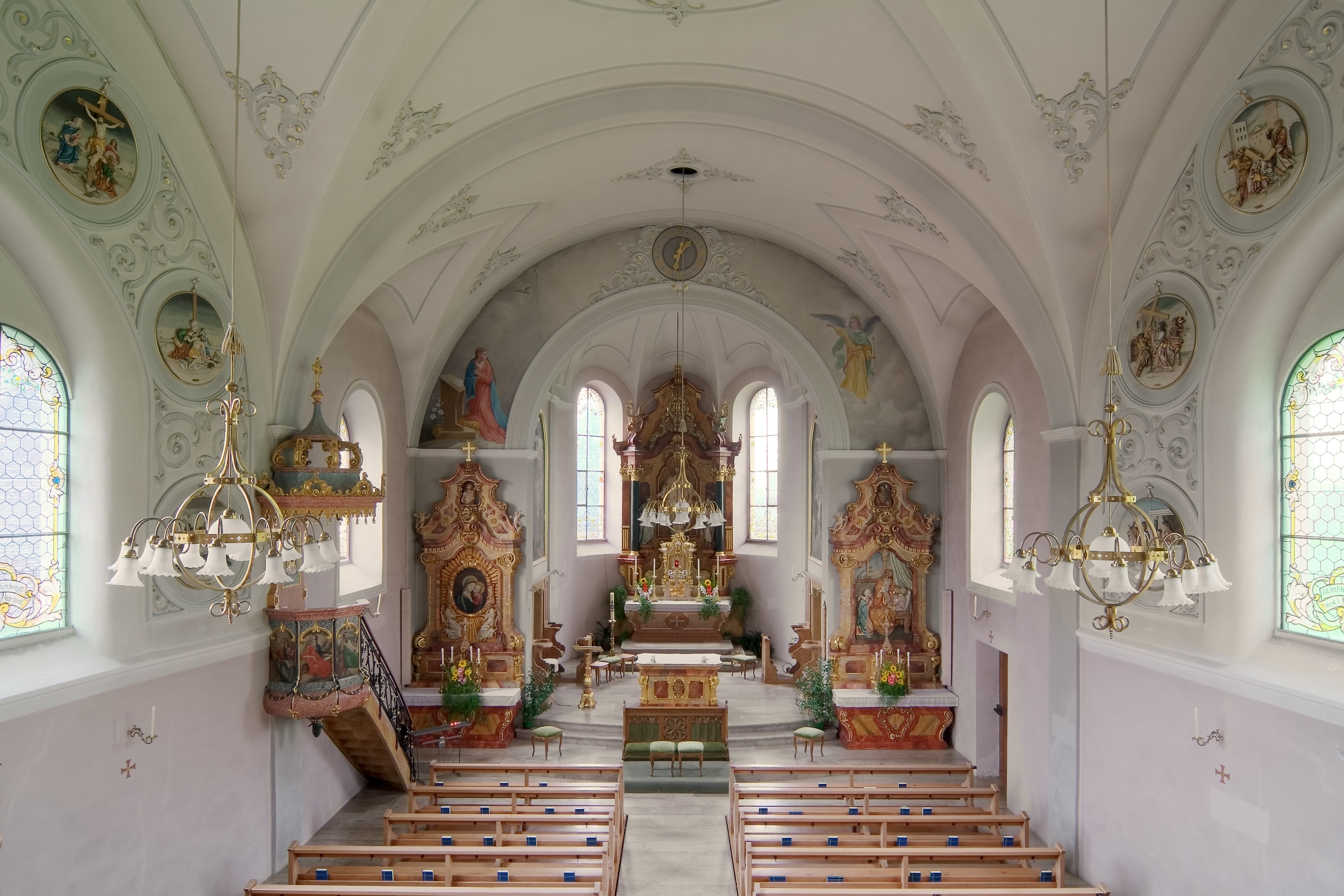
Interior of Schlatt village church

From the 2000 census, 1,005 or 87.7% were Roman Catholic, while 68 or 5.9% belonged to the Swiss Reformed Church. Of the rest of the population, there were 3 members of an Orthodox church (or about 0.26% of the population), and there were 8 individuals (or about 0.70% of the population) who belonged to another Christian church. There were 24 (or about 2.09% of the population) who were Islamic. 26 (or about 2.27% of the population) belonged to no church, are agnostic or atheist, and 12 individuals (or about 1.05% of the population) did not answer the question.

== Education ==
In Schlatt-Haslen about 319 or (27.8%) of the population have completed non-mandatory upper secondary education, and 44 or (3.8%) have completed additional higher education (either University or a Fachhochschule). Of the 44 who completed tertiary schooling, 77.3% were Swiss men, 15.9% were Swiss women.

As of 2000, there was one student in Schlatt-Haslen who came from another district, while 123 residents attended schools outside the district.
