= Jean-Pierre Wolf =

French and Swiss physicist (born 1960)

Jean-Pierre Wolf (born July 14, 1960) is a French and Swiss physicist and biophotonics expert and a professor at the Applied Physics Department (GAP) of the University of Geneva.

== Education and career ==
Wolf was born in Lausanne and studied physics at École Polytechnique Fédérale de Lausanne, where he received his diploma in 1984 and PhD in 1987 under the supervision of Ludger Wöste. He received habilitation from the University of Lyon in 1991.

== Research ==
His research activities are related with applications of ultrafast spectroscopy for biological, medical, and environmental research. He is working with Jérôme Kasparian on laser beams to control the weather. The technique is similar to cloud seeding, and could potentially influence the triggering and guiding of lightning.

In 2018, he is one of the two winners of the ZEISS Research Award for his research on high intensity lasers and their applications to atmospheric sciences.

Since 2017 his group is taking part into the Consortium of the European project Laser Lighting Rod. In 2023 the LLR consortium demonstrated the first guiding of natural lightning over more than 50 m using laser filamentation.
