= Plasma channel =

A plasma channel is a conductive channel of plasma. A plasma channel can be formed in the following ways.

1. With a high-powered laser that operates at a certain frequency that will provide enough energy for an atmospheric gas to break into its ions, or form a plasma, such as in a Laser-Induced Plasma Channel, for example in an electrolaser.
2. With a voltage higher than the dielectric breakdown voltage applied across a dielectric, and dielectric breakdown occurs.

A plasma channel has a low electrical resistance and, once formed, will permit continuous current flow if the energy source that heats the plasma can be maintained. Unlike a normal electrical conductor, the resistance (and voltage drop) across an unconfined plasma channel decreases with increasing current flow, a property called negative resistance. As a result, an electric spark that initially required a very high voltage to initiate avalanche breakdown within the insulating gas will rapidly evolve into a hot, low-voltage electric arc if the electrical power source can continue to deliver sufficient power to the arc. Plasma channels tend to self constrict (see plasma pinch) due to magnetic forces stemming from the current flowing through the plasma.

On Earth, plasma channels are most frequently encountered in lightning storms.
