= Säntis =

Mountain in Switzerland

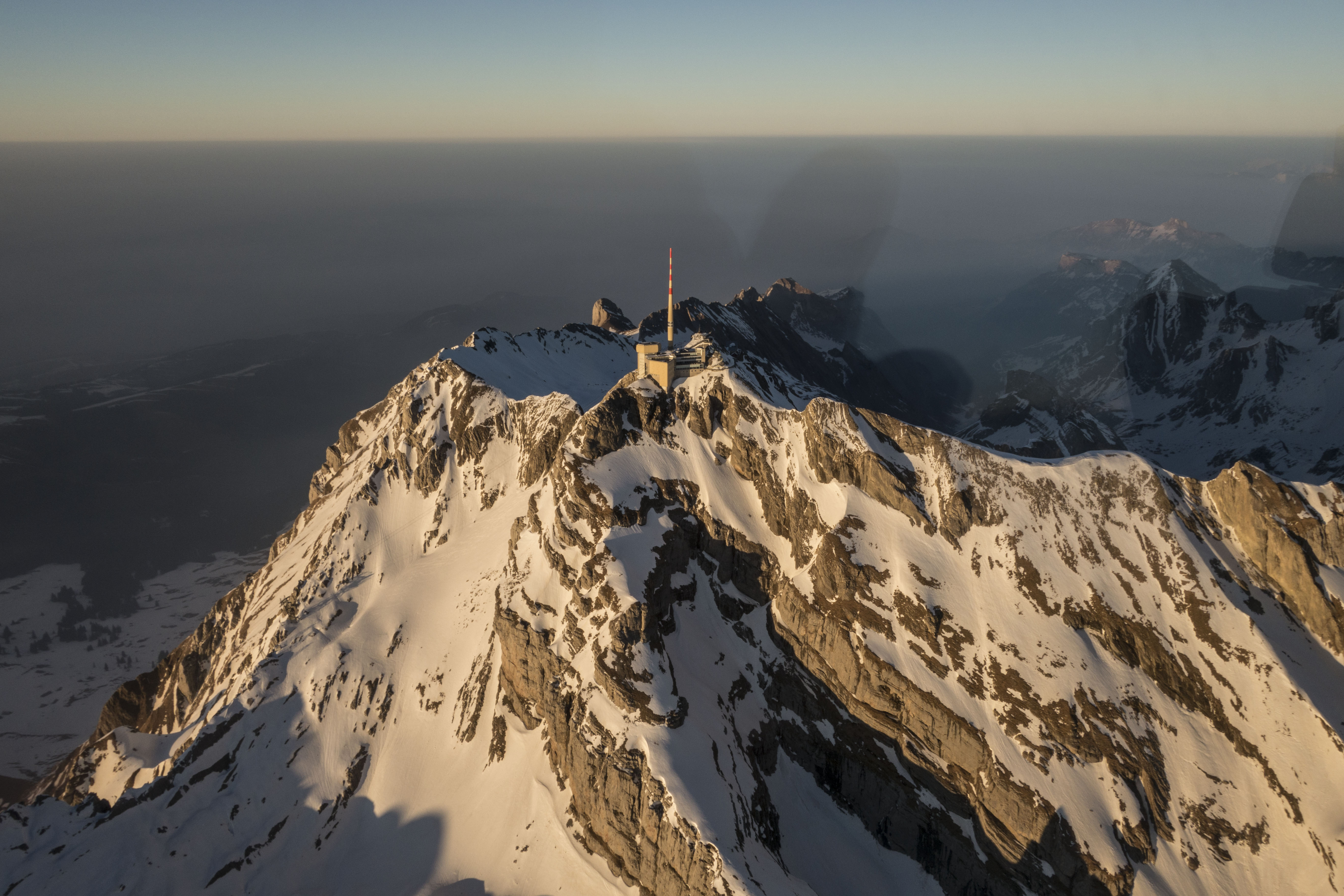
- Aerial view of Säntis

Highest point
- Elevation: 2,502 m (8,209 ft)
- Prominence: 2,021 m (6,631 ft)(#13 in the Alps)
- Isolation: 25.7 km (16.0 mi)
- Listing: Canton high point Ultra
- Coordinates: 47°14′57.73″N 9°20′35.92″E

Geography
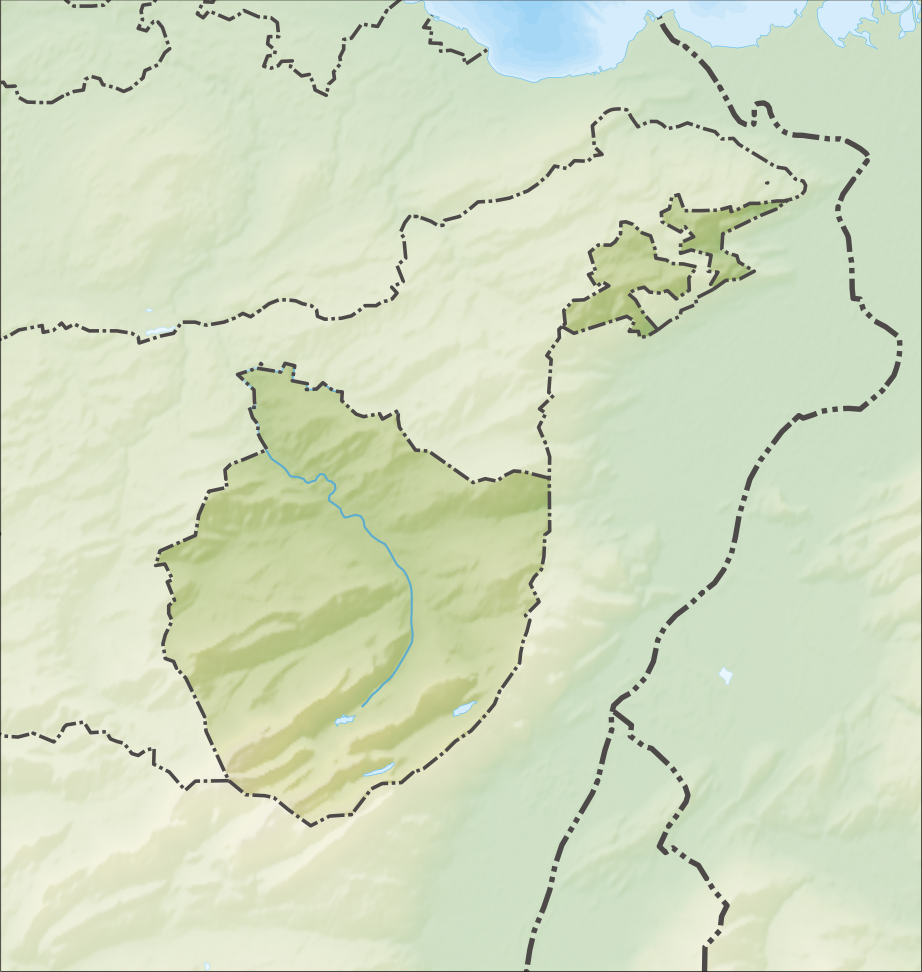
- Location within Alps Location within Switzerland Location within Canton of Appenzell Ausserrhoden Location within Canton of Appenzell Innerrhoden Location within Canton of St. Gallen
- Country: Switzerland
- Cantons of: Appenzell Ausserrhoden; Appenzell Innerrhoden; St. Gallen
- Parent range: Appenzell Alps

At 2,501.9 metres (8,208 ft) above sea level, Säntis (German pronunciation: [ˈzɛntɪs]) is the highest mountain in the Alpstein massif of northeastern Switzerland. It is also the culminating point of the whole Appenzell Alps, between Lake Walen and Lake Constance. Shared by three cantons, the mountain is a highly visible landmark thanks to its exposed northerly position within the Alpstein massif. As a consequence, houses called Säntisblick (English: Säntis view) can be found in regions as far away as the Black Forest in Germany. Säntis is among the most prominent summits in the Alps and the most prominent summit in Europe with an observation deck on the top. The panorama from the summit is spectacular. Six countries can be seen if the weather allows: Switzerland, Germany, Austria, Liechtenstein, France, and Italy.

== Geography ==
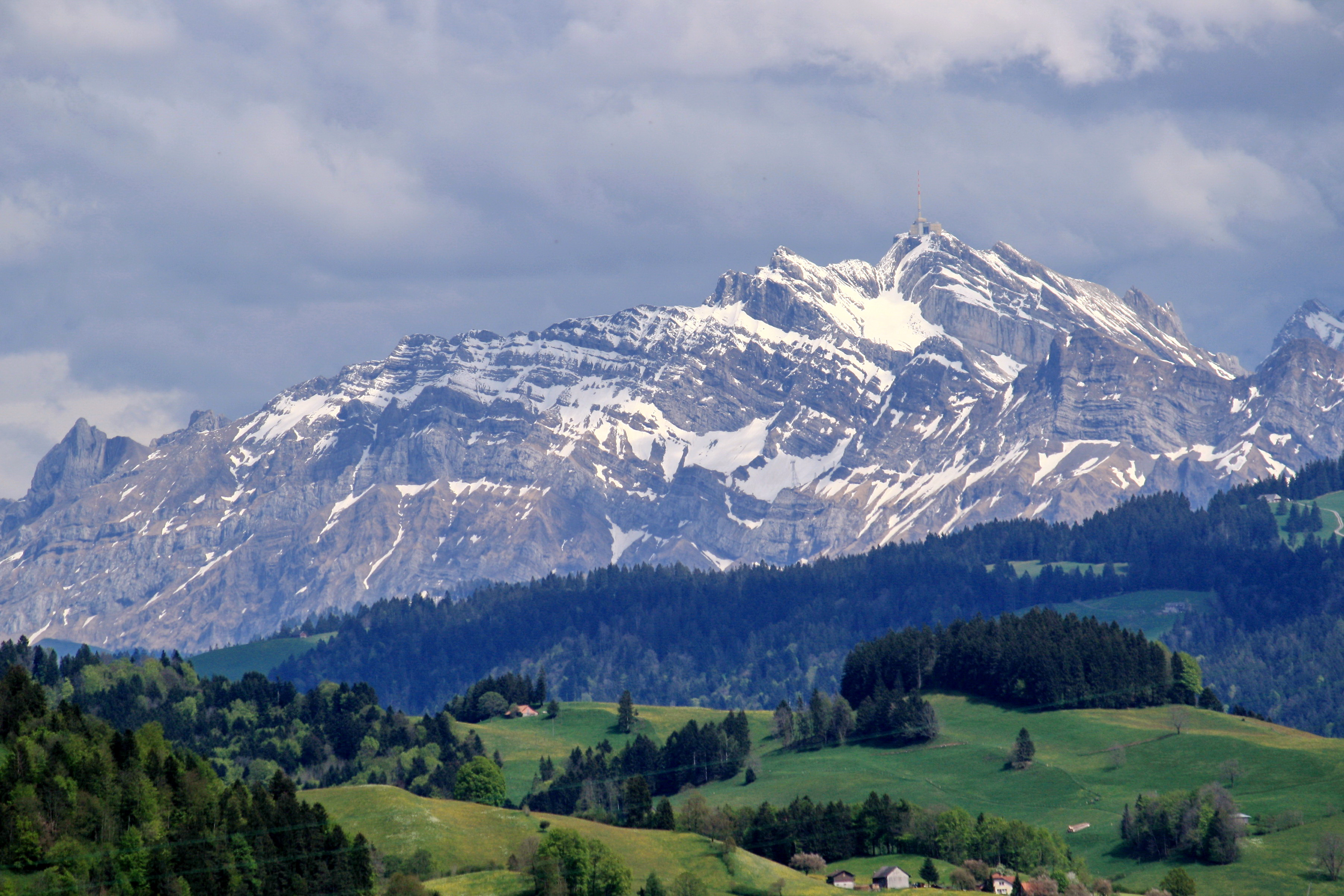
Säntis seen from the Batzberg

Säntis is located in the Alpstein region, nearly 10 kilometres (6.2 mi) (as the crow flies) southwest of the town of Appenzell and south of Kronberg. Three cantons meet on Säntis: Appenzell Ausserrhoden, Appenzell Innerrhoden, and St. Gallen, the mountain being split between the municipalities of Hundwil, Schwende and Wildhaus-Alt St. Johann. Even though its summit is at only 2,502 metres (8,209 ft) above sea level, the mountain ranks number 13th in the Alps and 29th in Europe in topographic prominence at 2,021 metres (6,631 ft). Peaks with high prominence often have impressive summit views, even if their elevations are relatively modest, Säntis being a prime example. Säntis is also the highest mountain of both cantons of Appenzell Ausserrhoden and Appenzell Innerrhoden.

=== Climate ===
The exposed position of Säntis results in weather conditions normally observed in the high Alps, which means being a typically polar climate (Köppen: ET) with heavy precipitation not found in most of the Arctic. For example, in April 1999, just beneath the summit on the northern snowfield of the mountain, a snow height of 816 cm (321 in) was recorded. The daily mean temperature is −0.7 °C (30.7 °F) with a precipitation of 2,840 mm (112 in) per year.

Climate data for Säntis (~12 m of the ridge), elevation: 2,490 m or 8,170 ft 1991–2020 normals
| Month | Jan | Feb | Mar | Apr | May | Jun | Jul | Aug | Sep | Oct | Nov | Dec | Year |
|---|---|---|---|---|---|---|---|---|---|---|---|---|---|
| Mean daily maximum °C (°F) | −4.1 (24.6) | −4.8 (23.4) | −3.3 (26.1) | −1.0 (30.2) | 3.2 (37.8) | 6.9 (44.4) | 9.2 (48.6) | 9.6 (49.3) | 6.2 (43.2) | 3.7 (38.7) | −0.7 (30.7) | −3.2 (26.2) | 1.8 (35.2) |
| Daily mean °C (°F) | −6.8 (19.8) | −7.5 (18.5) | −5.6 (21.9) | −3.0 (26.6) | 1.0 (33.8) | 4.5 (40.1) | 6.4 (43.5) | 6.8 (44.2) | 3.6 (38.5) | 1.1 (34.0) | −3.3 (26.1) | −5.9 (21.4) | −0.7 (30.7) |
| Mean daily minimum °C (°F) | −9.3 (15.3) | −10.0 (14.0) | −8.0 (17.6) | −5.3 (22.5) | −1.3 (29.7) | 2.1 (35.8) | 4.0 (39.2) | 4.5 (40.1) | 1.3 (34.3) | −1.3 (29.7) | −5.7 (21.7) | −8.4 (16.9) | −3.1 (26.4) |
| Average precipitation mm (inches) | 269.5 (10.61) | 221.9 (8.74) | 254.6 (10.02) | 176.2 (6.94) | 224.0 (8.82) | 242.8 (9.56) | 278.6 (10.97) | 266.3 (10.48) | 214.3 (8.44) | 193.4 (7.61) | 204.9 (8.07) | 293.6 (11.56) | 2,840.1 (111.81) |
| Average snowfall cm (inches) | 133.0 (52.4) | 140.3 (55.2) | 133.7 (52.6) | 95.7 (37.7) | 63.9 (25.2) | 29.7 (11.7) | 13.2 (5.2) | 12.0 (4.7) | 37.7 (14.8) | 59.7 (23.5) | 117.8 (46.4) | 165.2 (65.0) | 1,001.9 (394.4) |
| Average precipitation days (≥ 1.0 mm) | 12.7 | 12.3 | 14.4 | 12.8 | 15.1 | 16.1 | 16.5 | 15.8 | 13.4 | 11.6 | 12.3 | 14.9 | 167.9 |
| Average snowy days (≥ 1.0 cm) | 14.2 | 13.4 | 15.0 | 12.5 | 9.0 | 4.6 | 2.0 | 1.7 | 5.3 | 8.1 | 12.1 | 15.7 | 113.6 |
| Average relative humidity (%) | 66 | 68 | 74 | 79 | 83 | 85 | 85 | 82 | 79 | 72 | 71 | 69 | 76 |
| Mean monthly sunshine hours | 127.8 | 132.3 | 155.3 | 161.8 | 162.7 | 159.5 | 168.1 | 170.9 | 157.7 | 160.7 | 118.4 | 111.5 | 1,786.7 |
| Percentage possible sunshine | 46 | 46 | 43 | 41 | 36 | 35 | 36 | 40 | 43 | 48 | 43 | 43 | 41 |
Source 1: NOAA
Source 2: MeteoSwiss

Climate data for Säntis (~12 m of the ridge), elevation: 2,490 m or 8,170 ft, 1961-1990 normals and extremes
| Month | Jan | Feb | Mar | Apr | May | Jun | Jul | Aug | Sep | Oct | Nov | Dec | Year |
|---|---|---|---|---|---|---|---|---|---|---|---|---|---|
| Record high °C (°F) | 6.0 (42.8) | 10.1 (50.2) | 9.2 (48.6) | 11.0 (51.8) | 13.8 (56.8) | 15.1 (59.2) | 20.8 (69.4) | 18.0 (64.4) | 16.1 (61.0) | 15.5 (59.9) | 9.8 (49.6) | 7.3 (45.1) | 20.8 (69.4) |
| Mean maximum °C (°F) | 2.2 (36.0) | 2.1 (35.8) | 3.2 (37.8) | 5.0 (41.0) | 8.9 (48.0) | 12.5 (54.5) | 14.7 (58.5) | 14.8 (58.6) | 12.7 (54.9) | 10.6 (51.1) | 6.7 (44.1) | 3.8 (38.8) | 14.8 (58.6) |
| Mean daily maximum °C (°F) | −5.1 (22.8) | −5.3 (22.5) | −4.2 (24.4) | −2.0 (28.4) | 1.8 (35.2) | 5.1 (41.2) | 7.3 (45.1) | 7.3 (45.1) | 6.0 (42.8) | 3.7 (38.7) | −1.2 (29.8) | −3.5 (25.7) | 0.8 (33.5) |
| Daily mean °C (°F) | −8.3 (17.1) | −8.3 (17.1) | −7.1 (19.2) | −4.5 (23.9) | −0.5 (31.1) | 2.8 (37.0) | 5.1 (41.2) | 5.0 (41.0) | 3.6 (38.5) | 1.0 (33.8) | −4.0 (24.8) | −6.5 (20.3) | −1.8 (28.8) |
| Mean daily minimum °C (°F) | −10.7 (12.7) | −10.5 (13.1) | −9.2 (15.4) | −6.6 (20.1) | −2.7 (27.1) | 0.5 (32.9) | 2.4 (36.3) | 2.5 (36.5) | 1.1 (34.0) | −1.4 (29.5) | −6.4 (20.5) | −9.0 (15.8) | −4.2 (24.5) |
| Mean minimum °C (°F) | −19.9 (−3.8) | −18.4 (−1.1) | −16.9 (1.6) | −13.9 (7.0) | −9.6 (14.7) | −5.9 (21.4) | −3.8 (25.2) | −3.6 (25.5) | −5.7 (21.7) | −9.2 (15.4) | −15.2 (4.6) | −18.0 (−0.4) | −19.9 (−3.8) |
| Record low °C (°F) | −30.4 (−22.7) | −29.1 (−20.4) | −27.8 (−18.0) | −18.9 (−2.0) | −15.9 (3.4) | −9.7 (14.5) | −7.1 (19.2) | −8.0 (17.6) | −9.9 (14.2) | −13.6 (7.5) | −21.4 (−6.5) | −25.7 (−14.3) | −30.4 (−22.7) |
| Average precipitation mm (inches) | 229.0 (9.02) | 201.0 (7.91) | 209.0 (8.23) | 249.0 (9.80) | 235.0 (9.25) | 293.0 (11.54) | 315.0 (12.40) | 333.0 (13.11) | 211.0 (8.31) | 171.0 (6.73) | 211.0 (8.31) | 246.0 (9.69) | 2,903 (114.3) |
| Average precipitation days (≥ 1.0 mm) | 15.0 | 13.0 | 15.0 | 16.0 | 16.0 | 17.0 | 16.0 | 16.0 | 12.0 | 10.0 | 12.0 | 14.0 | 172 |
| Average relative humidity (%) | 72.0 | 71.0 | 76.0 | 81.0 | 82.0 | 83.0 | 81.0 | 80.0 | 74.0 | 66.0 | 70.0 | 68.0 | 75.3 |
| Mean monthly sunshine hours | 114.7 | 134.3 | 148.2 | 141.9 | 153.7 | 147.4 | 169.1 | 165.7 | 176.1 | 187.6 | 132.6 | 120.6 | 1,791.9 |
Source: NOAA Open climate chart for the corresponding period

== Panorama ==
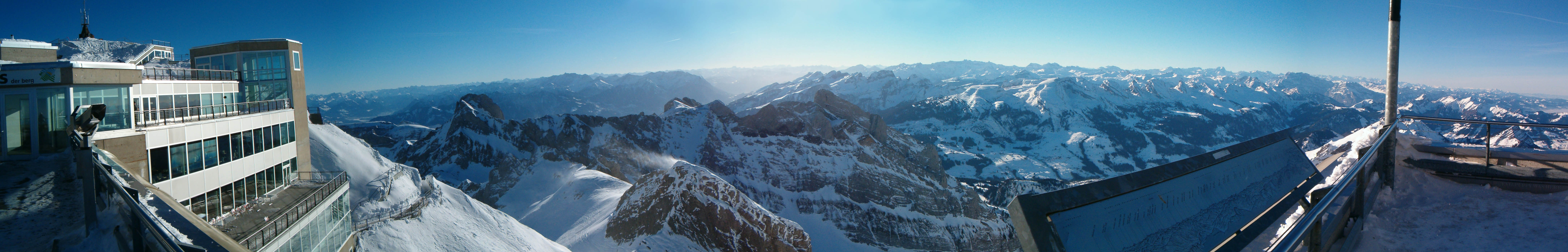
View from the summit

== History ==
The name Säntis or Santizo dates back to the 9th century. It is an abbreviation of the Romansh language for Sambatinus (English: the one born on Saturday), which was thought to be the name of a nearby area. The name was later used to refer to the summit. In the German language it was called Semptis or Sämptis. The mountain later gave its name to a canton of the Helvetic Republic (1798–1803).

=== Weather station ===
The International Meteorological Congress of Rome in 1879 declared it as a necessity to build weather stations on adequate and accessible summits. Therefore, the Swiss built a weather station on Säntis. The position of the northern ridge proved to be ideal for such an endeavour. The weather station was commissioned in autumn of 1882.

=== Säntis murder ===
The so-called Säntismord (English: Säntis murder) happened in the winter of 1922. It refers to a crime in which the weather station keeper Heinrich Haas and his wife Maria Magdalena were murdered. The murder was only discovered because of missing weather reports on 21 February. As a result of the missing reports, a search party was sent to Säntis, where they discovered the bodies. The prime suspect was shoemaker Gregor Anton Kreuzpointner, who committed suicide three weeks after the murder. The truth about this double murder hence remains unclear to this day.

=== Lightning measurements station ===
Säntis has one of the highest rate of lightning strikes in Europe. In 2010 a lightning measurement station was installed atop a 120 m (390 ft) tall telecommunications tower on the mountain by the Electromagnetic Compatibility Lab of the EPFL in Lausanne. The station automatically records about one gigabyte of data per strike and then notifies researchers. In the first nine months of operation it recorded about 50 strikes, including 7 positive lightning strikes.

Since 2021, a research consortium led by Jean-Pierre Wolf has been testing a laser lightning rod system from here, firing short 0.7 TW laser pulses into clouds to stimulate lightning discharge.

== Economy ==
=== Transmission tower ===
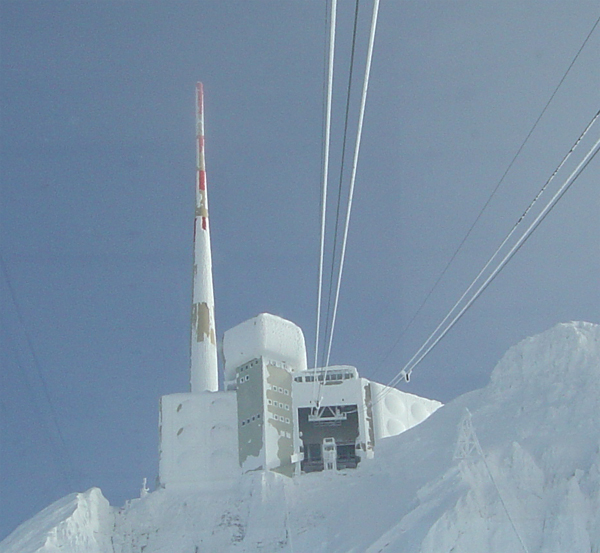
Säntis Transmission tower

Located at the peak of Säntis is a 123.55 meter high transmission tower, which was commissioned in November 1997. The original tower, built in 1955, had to be renovated several times due to the rough weather conditions before finally being replaced. The antenna of the new transmission tower got a fibre-glass enforced plastic layer on the outside in order to prevent ice falling onto the visitors' terrace. Swiss radio channels such as DRS 1, DRS 2, DRS 3, RSR la Première and RSI Rete Uno are broadcast from the tower. Swiss television channels such as SF 1, SF 2, SF Info, TSR 1 and TSI 1 are also broadcast from this location.

=== Tourism ===
Today, the summit is easily accessible by aerial tramway from Schwägalp. It had been a popular destination for tourists since the mid 19th century. However, even though many ideas to make the summit more easily accessible existed since those days, it took almost another century for them to materialize. Many approaches, using various types of railways starting from several nearby towns, were tried, but ultimately failed. One project planned to access Säntis from Wasserauen or Unterwasser by rack-and-pinion railway. While the lower section of this project between Appenzell and Wasserauen was built and is still part of today's active railway network, the rest of it was halted due to a lack of funding. Finally, local businessman Dr. Carl Meyer of Herisau came forward with the idea to construct an aerial tramway from the base of the mountain, at Schwägalp, and build a mountain road from the nearby town of Urnäsch for easier access to its lower terminal. On 22 September 1933, his project was ultimately selected for construction and Meyer was awarded with the necessary licences by the federal government. Finally, on 1 July 1935, the aerial tramway started operations. The original cabins were replaced by larger ones in 1960. The entire aerial tramway installation was replaced between 1968 and 1976. In 2000, new cabins were commissioned. The aerial tramway Luftseilbahn Schwägalp-Säntis is one of the most frequented tramways in Switzerland. It has a total length of 2,307 metres (7,569 ft). The altitude gain between the terminals is 1,123 metres (3,684 ft). The journey takes roughly 8 minutes. The first tramway was constructed from 1933 to 1935.

== Miscellaneous ==
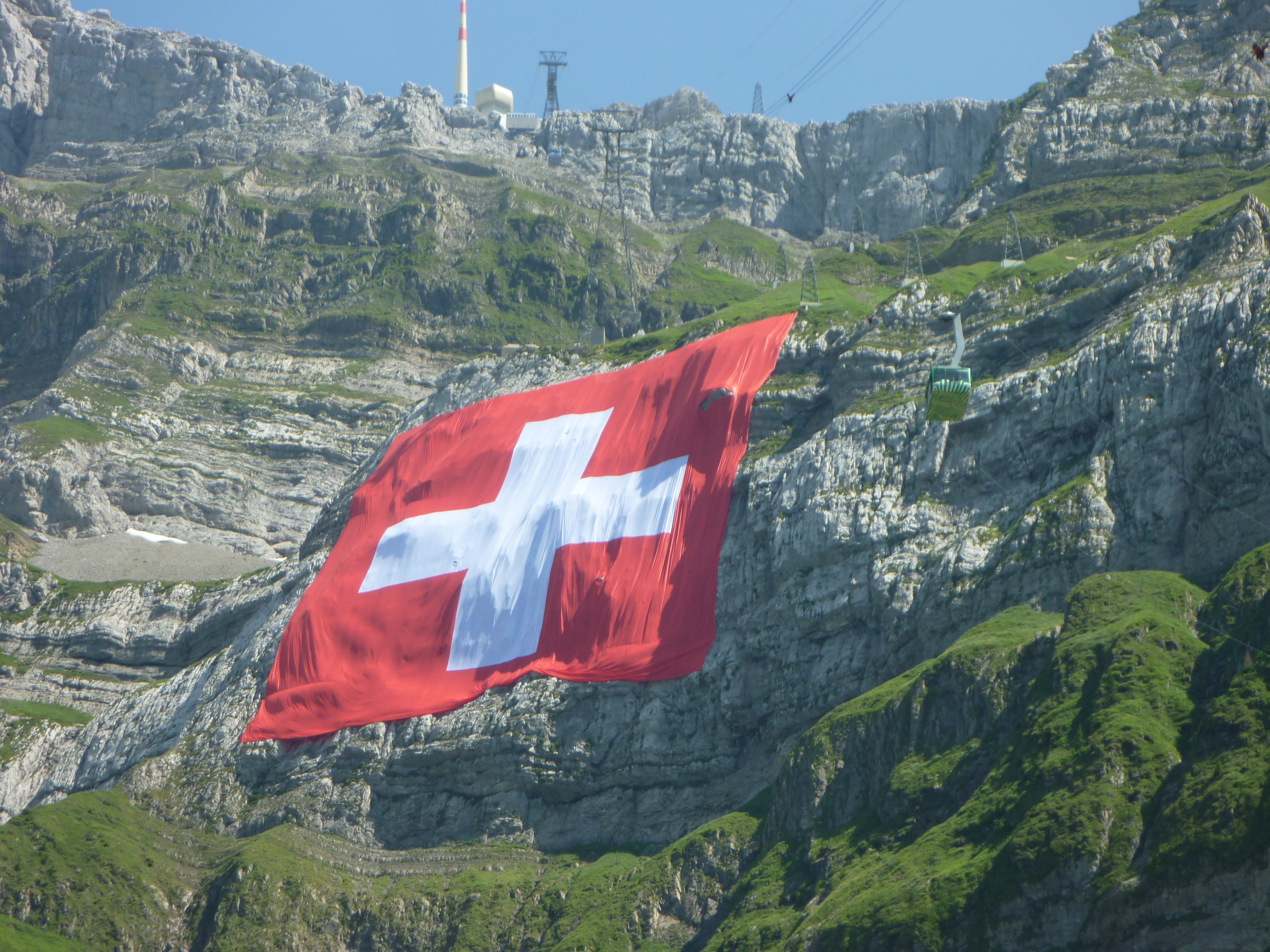
Swiss flag on Säntis

In honour of the Swiss National Day, which is celebrated 1 August each year, the world's largest Swiss flag was to be seen on Säntis from 31 July – 2 August 2009. The square national flag was 120 meters each side and weighed 1.2 tons. The flag ripped on 2 August 2009 due to strong winds in the area.

During the Helvetic Republic, the mountain lent its name to the former canton of Säntis.

Since 2001 there is a stupa (chorten) on the short path between the Säntis aerial tramway station and the summit, commemorating the first refugees from Tibet who arrived in Switzerland in 1960. Some of them lived in the Kinderdorf Pestalozzi (Pestalozzi Children's village) in Trogen (about 20 km northeast of the Säntis). On an inscription (commemorative plaque), the Tibetan community in Switzerland thanks the Swiss people and government for welcoming them after they fled their homeland.

== See also ==
- List of most isolated mountains of Switzerland
- List of mountains of Switzerland accessible by public transport
- List of mountains of Appenzell Ausserrhoden
- List of mountains of Appenzell Innerrhoden
- List of mountains of the canton of St. Gallen
- Tourism in Switzerland
