= Shirana Shahbazi =

Iranian-born photographer (born 1974)

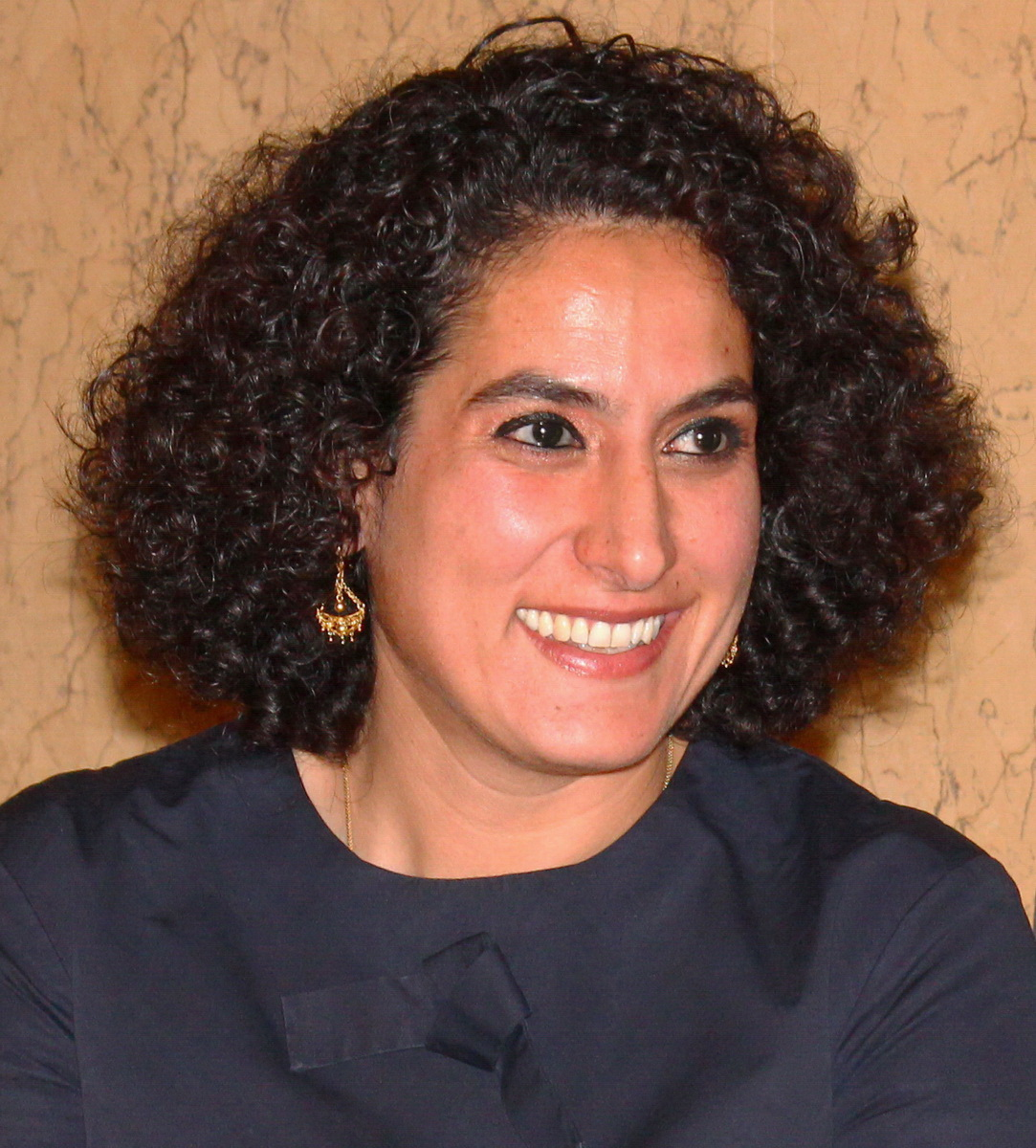
- Shahbazi in 2012
- Born: 1974 (age 51–52); Tehran, Tehran province, Iran
- Education: Dortmund University of Applied Sciences and Arts, Zurich University of the Arts

Shirana Shahbazi (Persian: شیرانا شهبازی; born 1974) is an Iranian-born photographer who now lives in Switzerland. Her work includes installations and large prints of conceptual photography.

== Biography ==
Born in Tehran, Shahbazi moved to West Germany in 1985, studying photography and design at the University of Applied Sciences and Arts in Dortmund from 1995 to 1997. From 1997 to 2000, Shahbazi attended the Zurich University of the Arts in Switzerland, specializing in photography. She currently lives and works in Zurich. Her first successful sequence Goftare Nik/Good Words of color photographs taken in Iran (published as a book in 2001 with Hatje Cantz) led to the Citibank Private Bank Photography Prize in 2002. In 2002, she presented a series of images of Switzerland titled The Garden. At the Venice Biennale in 2003, she presented The Annunciation, an enormous installation in the central pavilion with murals by Iranian painters based on her photographs and a ceiling of lilies. She is the recipient of 2019 Prix Meret Oppenheim.

== Work ==
Presented as an installation, her Meanwhile series (2007), combines everyday images of landscapes, portraits and still lifes from her world travels, one of her images expanded to poster size by an Iranian billboard artist. Other photographs are reproduced as paintings or even carpets. The exhibition Then Again (2012) at the Fotomuseum Winterthur presents 18 large-format works demonstrating how a photograph can be transformed from a depiction of reality into a geometric abstraction. As discussed by Adam Jasper's review in Artforum, Shahbazi's photographs are true abstractions in that they are less a representational photograph than they are actual objects themselves, highly constructed. Continuing to work in analog photographic methods, some of Shabazi's newest works exist as geometric shapes captured on polished mirrors with thin films of color.

== Art Projects ==
Shahabazi also works on projects in public spaces. In 2005, she participated in a poster campaign in Zurich's Hardau district. At the construction site of the Swisscom Tower in Ostermundigen during the renovation from early to mid-2020, Shahabazi and the Danish-born and Zurich-resided artist Cristian Andersen created a geometric installation made of ceramic plates. In 2024, she started a replacement of a racist and colonialist mural dating from 1949 in the Wylergut schoolhouse in Bern, which is to be completed by the school's students over three years.

== Exhibitions ==
Shahbazi's work has been widely exhibited all over the world. In 2007, Shabhazi exhibited Meanwhile at the Swiss Institute in New York City and at the Barbican Art Gallery London, in 2008. Shahbazi is represented by Galerie Peter Kilchmann, Zurich. The exhibition Monstera at Kunsthalle Bern in 2014 was curated by Fabrice Stroun and Tenzing Barshee. The artist has been exhibiting regularly since 1997, with her solo exhibition 2018 at Kunsthaus Hamburg in Germany and 2026 at Kunstmuseum Luzern: Shirana Shahbazi. All at Once. An Interplay with Li Tavor. Numerous photographs are held in the collection of The Museum of Modern Art, New York.

== Bibliography ==
- Shahbazi, Shirana (2007). Meanwhile. JRP Ringier. ISBN 978-3-905829051
- Shahbazi, Shirana (2012). Shirana Shahbazi: Then Again. Innovative Logistics Llc. ISBN 978-3-86930-338-3.
- Shahbazi, Shirana (2014). Monstera. JRP Ringier. ISBN 978-3-0376440-0-3.
- Shahbazi, Shirana (2017). Shirana Shahbazi : first things first. Sternberg Press. ISBN 9783956793240

== See also ==
- Swiss contemporary artists
- List of Iranian artists
