= Red Tower (Winterthur) =

Skyscraper in Winterthur, Switzerland

- Roter Turm (German)
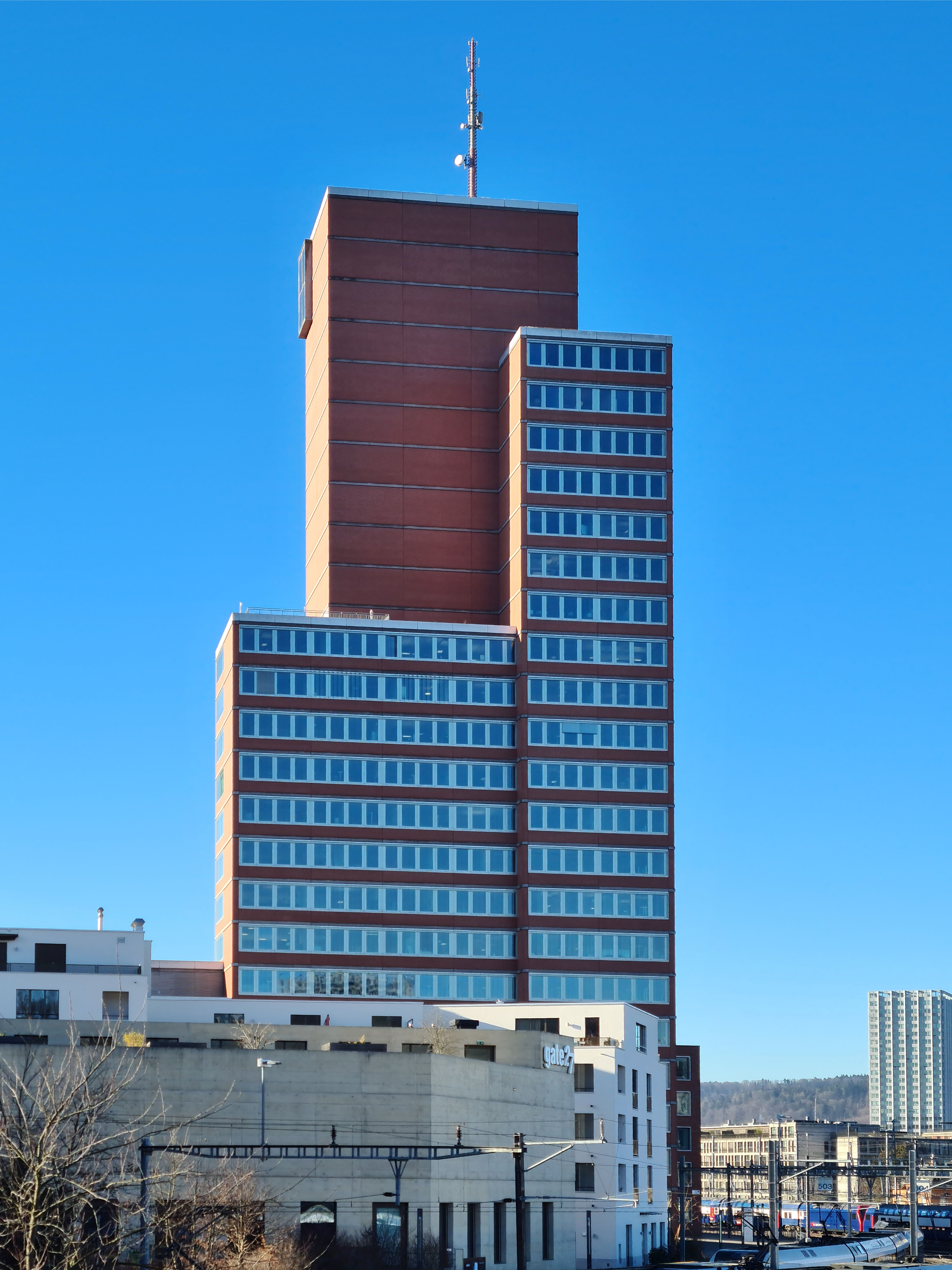
- Interactive map of the Red Tower area

General information
- Status: Completed
- Type: Office
- Location: Winterthur, Switzerland, 17 Theaterstrasse, Winterthur, Switzerland
- Coordinates: 47.50382°N 8.72739°E
- Construction started: 1998
- Completed: 1999
- Owner: Winterthur Group; Swiss Prime Site

Height
- Roof: 90 m (300 ft)

Technical details
- Structural system: Reinforced concrete
- Floor count: 25
- Floor area: 9,000 m^{2} (96,900 sq ft)
- Lifts/elevators: Otis Elevator Company

Design and construction
- Architect: Burkard Meyer Architekten
- Developer: Wincasa
- Main contractor: Swisscom

Website
- Roter Turm

The Red Tower (German: Roter Turm) also known as the Swisscom Tower is a high-rise office building in Winterthur, Switzerland, located north of Winterthur railway station. Built between 1998 and 1999, the tower stands at 90 m (300 ft) tall with 25 floors and is the current 16th-tallest building in Switzerland.

== History ==
=== Concept ===
The Wincasa company intends to continue rejuvenating the location known as "Turm Areal Winterthur". The renovation of the space is a collaborative effort between Wincasa and Swiss Prime Site Immobilien AG, who owns the building. The first step was to standardize the signage to make the area's identity more prominent.

To enhance the visibility of the area's identity, a new uniform signage visitor guidance system will be implemented starting in November 2019. This will be completely set up by the spring of 2020. The SV Group manages the food service at ZHAW and it is available to other tenants and the public. Another advancement in enhancing the region is the introduction of greenery in the central courtyard. The entire construction project will be finished by spring 2021. Since the completion of the Red Tower in late 1999, the requirements of the residents and the community have evolved.

=== Architecture ===
The tower was designed by Baden based Burkard Meyer Architekten studio and is located in Winterthur. It is part of a multi-building complex consisting of lower-rising volumes forming small quartals put together. These shorter buildings share the same functionality of office spaces with the Red Tower. A restaurant operated the top levels of the building until late 2015 when it was closed down.

The building's materiality balance alternate in the favour of the facade decorative brickstone, keeping the curtain wall glazing made of insulated glass panels at a more reduced proportion. All of the tower's facades have been renovated as the works consisted of the external glazing being statically reinforced with a total of 210 fixed pieces, 3400 movable vertical slats and 1650 movable horizontal slats.

The tower houses office spaces which can vary in terms of gross usable areas between 200 and 500 m^{2} (5,380 sq ft).

== See also ==
- List of tallest buildings in Switzerland
