= Winterthur (disambiguation) =

Winterthur is a city in the Canton of Zürich, Switzerland.

Winterthur may also refer to:

- EHC Winterthur, an ice hockey team in Winterthur, Switzerland
- FC Winterthur, a football club in Winterthur, Switzerland
- Winterthur Group, a multinational insurance company originally founded in Winterthur, Switzerland
- Winterthur Museum, Garden and Library, a museum in Winterthur, Delaware
- Winterthur railway station, the main of ten railway stations in Winterthur, Switzerland
- Orchester Musikkollegium Winterthur, an orchestra based in Winterthur, Switzerland
