= JaBee Tower =

Skyscraper in Dübendorf, Switzerland

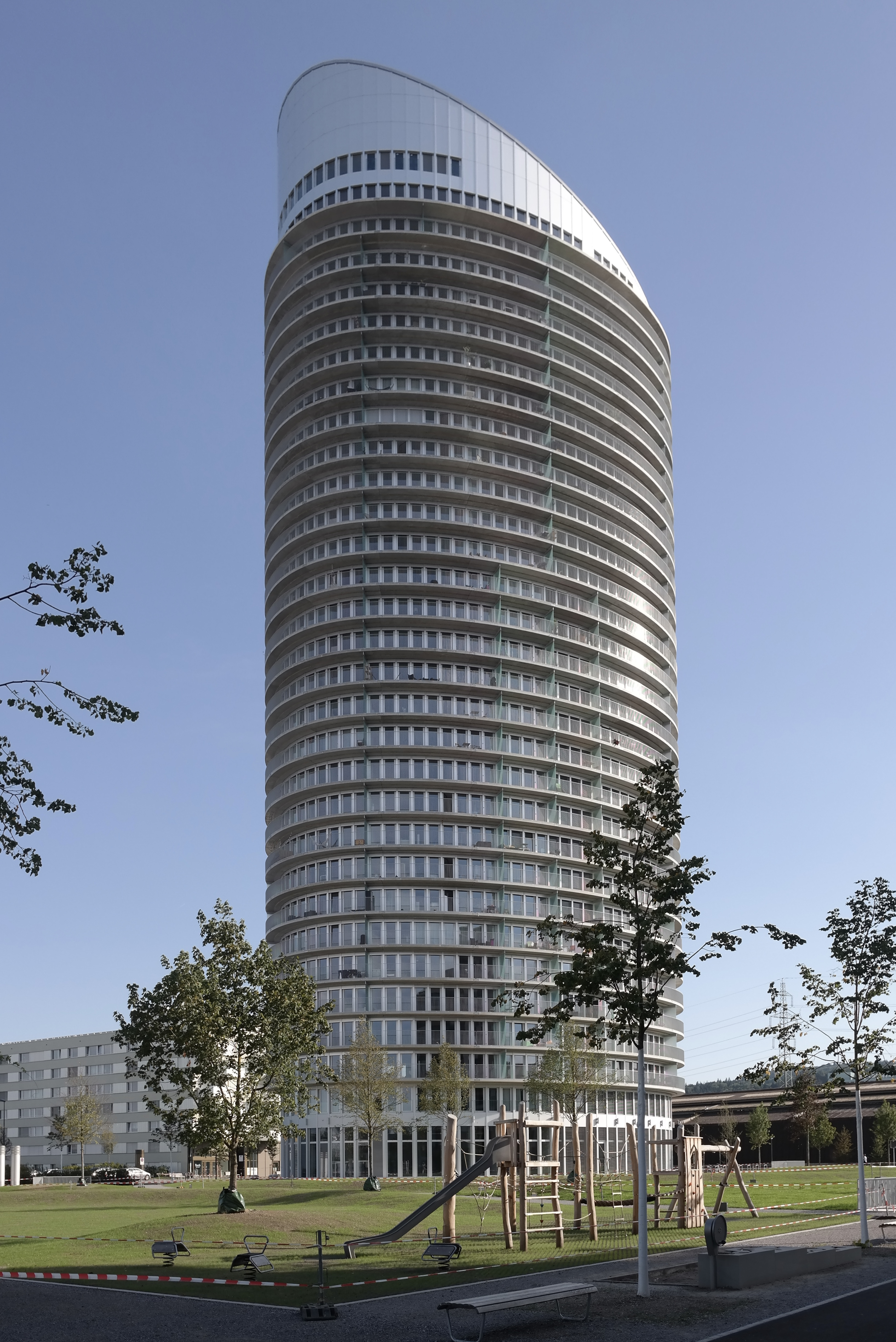
- Interactive map of the JaBee Tower area

General information
- Status: Completed
- Type: Residential
- Location: Dübendorf, Zürich, Switzerland, 56 Am Stadtrand, 8600 Dübendorf, Switzerland
- Coordinates: 47.40036°N 8.60034°E
- Construction started: 2016
- Completed: 2019

Height
- Roof: 100 m (330 ft)

Technical details
- Structural system: Reinforced concrete
- Floor count: 28
- Floor area: 4
- Lifts/elevators: Kone

Design and construction
- Architect: sattlerpartner architekten AG

Website
- Jabee Tower

The JaBee Tower is a residential high-rise building in the Dübendorf municipality of Zürich, Switzerland. Built between 2016 and 2019, the tower stands at 100 m (330 ft) tall with 28 floors and is the current 10th tallest building in Switzerland.

== History ==
=== Architecture ===
The tower was designed by the sattlerpartner architekten AG studio and is located in the Dübendorf district of Zürich, in the proximity of the Stettbach railway station. The tower was the tallest residential building in Switzerland until the completion of the BäreTower in 2022. The main characteristics of the building's volumetry are the elliptical floor plan and the inclined roof standing in the form of a slanted peak, which is illuminated at night by a surrounding light band. It houses a total of 218 rentable apartment units architecturally concentrated around the core of the building due to its oval shape.

Every apartment window and French window in the building features triple insulating glass coated with laminated safety glass to withstand the exposed location. The thermal coating merges contemporary energy efficiency and exceptional color neutrality with a remarkably high light transmission. The main attraction is the partition walls that create a rainbow effect between the balconies. Because they are installed at a 90° angle to the exterior wall, these 210 glass partitions will change color based on the direction of the light.

The tower have a unique feature: their floor-to-ceiling windows fill the interior with abundant natural light. Every apartment includes windows covering the outer walls and a balcony spanning the full width to bring in natural light.

== See also ==
- List of tallest buildings in Switzerland
