= List of tallest buildings in Switzerland =

This is a list of tallest buildings in Switzerland. All buildings over 80 m (262 ft) are listed. Only habitable buildings are ranked, which excludes radio masts and towers, observation towers, steeples, chimneys and other tall architectural structures. For those, see List of tallest structures in Switzerland.

== Completed buildings ==
Was the tallest building in Switzerland upon completion

Name	Image	Height m (ft)	Floors	Year	Location	Notes
Roche Tower 2		205 m (673 ft)	50	2022	Basel; 47.55945°N 7.60726°E	Tallest office building in Switzerland and subsequently the tallest in the country.
Roche Tower 1		178 m (584 ft)	41	2015	Basel; 47.5583°N 7.6076°E	Second tallest office building in Switzerland.
Prime Tower		126 m (413 ft)	36	2011	Zürich; 47.3860°N 8.5172°E	
Roche Tower 7		114 m (374 ft)	26	2023	Basel; 47.55948°N 7.60627°E	
Three Point Tower E		113 m (371 ft)	38	2024	Dübendorf; 47.39686°N 8.60214°E	Tallest residential tower in Switzerland.
Three Point Tower C		109 m (358 ft)	37	2024	Dübendorf; 47.39697°N 8.60134°E	
Basler Messeturm		105 m (344 ft)	32	2005	Basel; 47.56452°N 7.60240°E	
Three Point Tower D		102 m (335 ft)	37	2024	Dübendorf; 47.39724°N 8.60178°E	
BäreTower		101 m (331 ft)	33	2022	Ostermundigen; 46.95601°N 7.48072°E	
JaBee Tower		100 m (330 ft)	28	2019	Dübendorf; 47.40036°N 8.60034°E	
Sulzer Tower		99.7 m (327 ft)	28	1966	Winterthur; 47.49998°N 8.71809°E	
Clara Tower		96 m (315 ft)	29	2021	Basel; 47.33495°N 7.35558°E	
Hardau Residential Complex (Tower 1)		95 m (312 ft)	33	1978	Zürich; 47.22526°N 8.30362°E	
Le Lignon (Grande Tour)		91 m (299 ft)	34	1968	Vernier; 46.12110°N 6.55204°E	
Sunrise Tower		90 m (300 ft)	26	2004	Zürich; 47.24490°N 8.33954°E	
Roter Turm		90 m (300 ft)	24	1999	Winterthur; 47.30135°N 8.43384°E	
Langäckerstrasse 15		89 m (292 ft)	27	1973	Spreitenbach; 47.25268°N 8.215126°E	
Bâloise Park West		89 m (292 ft)	24	2020	Basel; 47.32567°N 7.35314°E	
Hochzwei		88 m (289 ft)	33	2012	Lucerne; 47.031826°N 8.035932°E	
Shoppi Tivoli		86 m (282 ft)	26	1970	Spreitenbach; 47.25204°N 8.22102°E	
Shoppi Hochhaus 11-13		86 m (282 ft)	26	1979	Spreitenbach; 47.25148°N 8.22116°E	
Business Park Tower		86 m (282 ft)	19	1972	Bern; 46.95453°N 7.47656°E	
Hardau Residential Complex (Tower 2)		86 m (282 ft)	30	1978	Zürich; 47.23551°N 8.32988°E	
Telli Tower		85 m (279 ft)	32	1972	Aarau 47.22520°N 8.30328°E	
Lacuna Hochhaus		85 m (279 ft)	25	1972	Chur; 46.51417°N 9.31341°E	
Giessenturm		85 m (279 ft)	26	2020	Dübendorf; 47.24263°N 8.36492°E	
Meret Oppenheim Hochhaus		84 m (276 ft)	19	2019	Basel; 47.32468°N 7.35132°E	
Migros-Hochhaus		83 m (272 ft)	20	1981	Zürich; 47.23888°N 8.31524°E	
Andreasturm		83 m (272 ft)	22	2018	Zürich; 47.24471°N 8.32497°E	
Franklin Tower		83 m (272 ft)	22	2023	Zürich; 47.24391°N 8.32331°E	
Ceres Tower		82 m (269 ft)	23	2017	Pratteln; 47.31327°N 7.41410°E	
Grosspeter Tower		81 m (266 ft)	22	2017	Basel; 47.32418°N 7.36787°E	
Parktower		81 m (266 ft)	25	2014	Zug; 47.10299°N 8.30505°E	
Mobimo Tower		81 m (266 ft)	24	2011	Zürich; 47.23172°N 8.30515°E	
Messeturm Zurich		81 m (266 ft)	22	2024	Zürich; 47.24531°N 8.3314°E	
Tour d'Ivoire		80 m (260 ft)	29	1969	Montreux; 46.25477°N 6.54447°E	
Limmat Tower		80 m (260 ft)	24	2013	Dietikon; 47.24322°N 8.24211°E	
Vulcano Towers		80 m (260 ft)	26	2018	Zürich; 47.23366°N 8.29416°E	
WestLink Tower		79 m (259 ft)	21	2017	Zürich; 47.23300°N 8.29304°E	
Swissôtel Zürich		79 m (259 ft)	32	1972	Zürich; 47.24392°N 8.32382°E	
Hardturm Park Tower (Sheraton Hotel Zurich)		79 m (259 ft)	24	2014	Zürich; 47.23263°N 8.30367°E	

== Buildings under construction ==
Name	Location	Height	Floors	Planned Opening
Tilia Tower	Lausanne	85 m (279 ft)	28	2026

== Buildings approved ==
Name	Location	Height	Floors	Planned opening	Status
Roche Tower 3	Basel	221 m (725 ft)	–	–	Approved
Rocket&Tigerli	Winterthur	100 m (328 ft)	32	2026	Approved

== See also ==
- List of tallest structures in Switzerland
