= Clara Tower =

Skyscraper in Basel, Switzerland

- Claraturm (German)
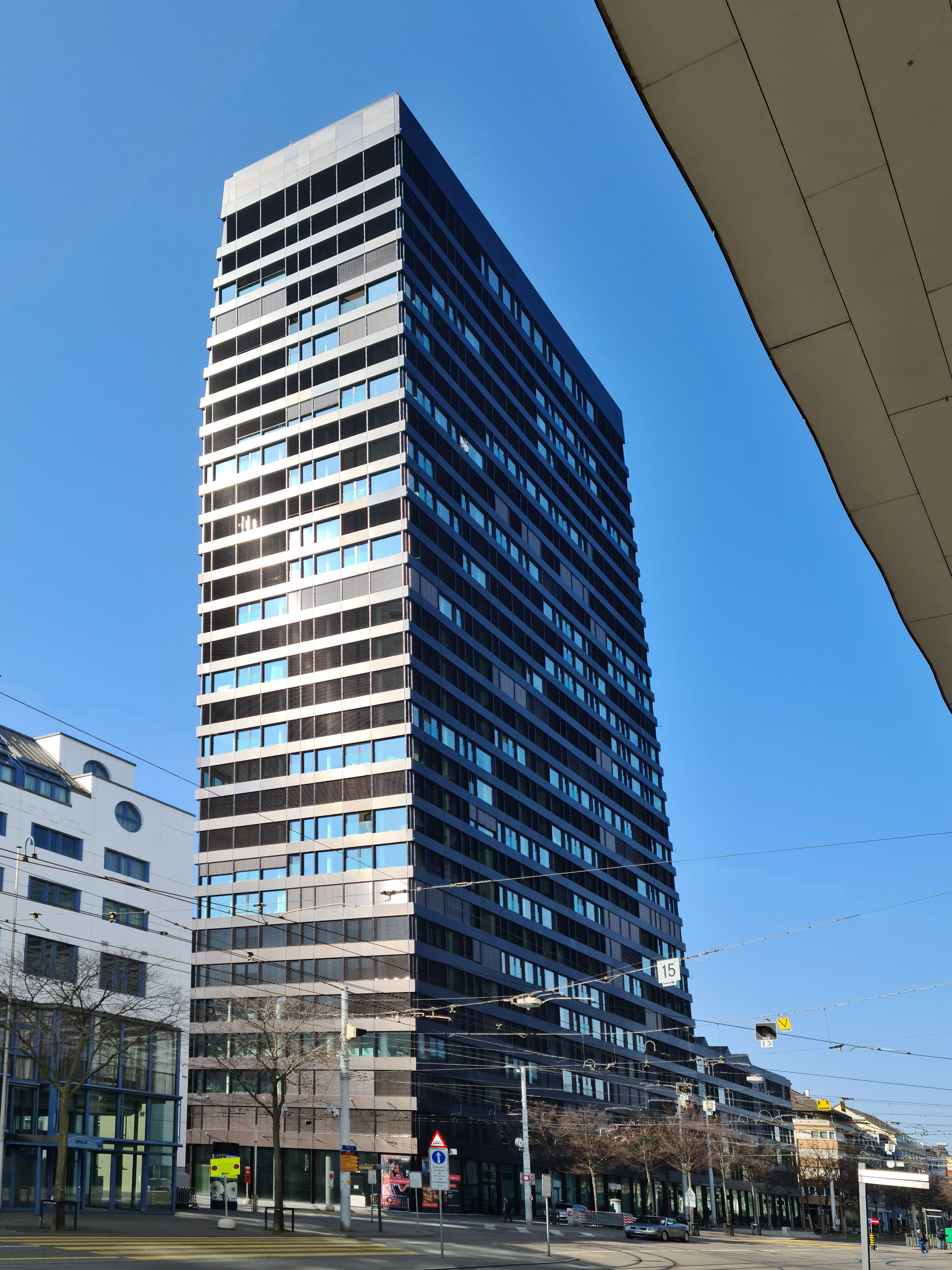
- Interactive map of the Clara Tower area

General information
- Status: Completed
- Type: Mixed-use: Residential, Office, Retail
- Location: Basel, Switzerland, 67 Riehenring, Basel, Switzerland
- Coordinates: 47.56365°N 7.59882°E
- Construction started: 2019
- Completed: 2021
- Owner: UBS Fund Management

Height
- Roof: 96 m (315 ft)

Technical details
- Structural system: Reinforced concrete
- Floor count: 30
- Floor area: 34,500 m^{2} (371,000 sq ft)

Design and construction
- Architect: Morger Partner Architekten AG
- Developer: Halter AG

Website
- Claraturm

The Clara Tower (German: Claraturm) is a mixed-use high-rise building in Basel, Switzerland. Built between 2019 and 2021, the tower stands at 96 m (315 ft) tall with 30 floors and is the current 12th tallest building in Switzerland.

== History ==
The building was designed by Swiss firm Morger Partner Architekten AG and is located in the Clara neighborhood of Basel, hence its official name of Claraturm in German. The main objective of the project was a fluctuating vision of the new urban development and demographic changes established and strategized in the area of the Exhibition Center Basel (Messe). The project is centered around the motion of the block perimeter growth, sloping towards the intended multi-purpose room for the community. At the conclusion of Clarastrasse, the building provides a modern complement to the trade fair center, Swissôtel Le Plaza, and the Basler Messeturm, forming a business showcase for the city.

The tower displays an adjoining annex volumetry destined for rentable retail spaces. The project demonstrates how data-driven software solutions can enhance efficiency and productivity in the construction sector. The building houses a total of 285 apartments, billed as MOVEment apartments, a suite of "high-tech" or "smart" units as they share the character of functional homes with modular furnishing with details of sustainability which can go up to the heating and ventilation systems used to keep an optimal indoor climate.

The building's facade sums up a total of 14,500 m^{2} (156,000 sq ft) of curtain wall glass-panel glazing equipped with motorized blinds and anodized coating of profiles and sheets.

== See also ==
- List of tallest buildings in Switzerland
