= Swiss Prime Site =

Swiss property investment company

Swiss Prime Site AG
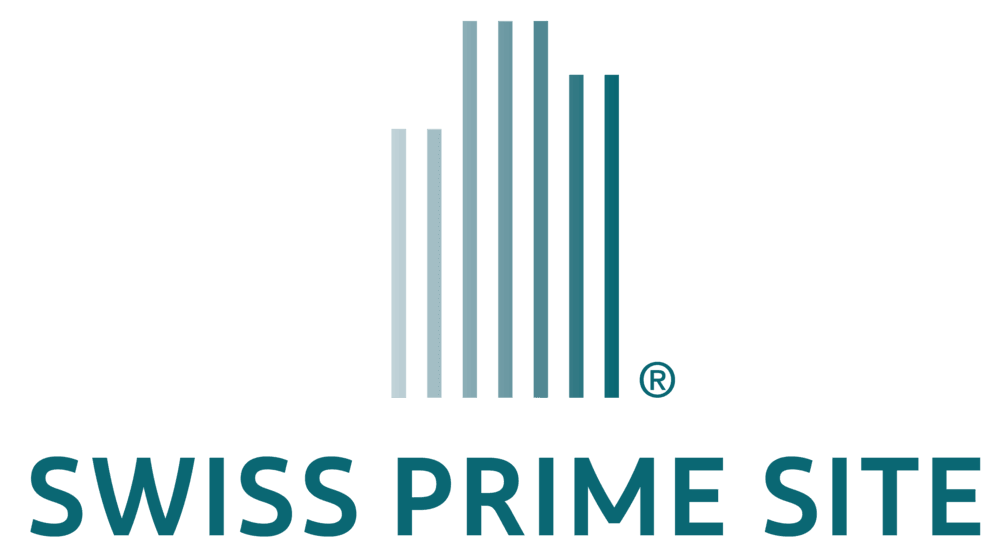
- Company type: Joint-stock company
- Traded as: SIX: SPSN; SMI MID component
- Industry: Real estate
- Founded: May 11, 1999; 27 years ago
- Founders: Credit Suisse, Siemens, Winterthur Group
- Headquarters: Zug, Switzerland
- Key people: CEO: Marcel Kucher; Chairman: Ton Buechner
- Number of employees: 219 (30.06.2025)
- Website: sps.swiss/en

Swiss Prime Site AG is one of the largest listed real estate companies in Europe. The fair value of the real estate under management is around CHF 27 billion. The portfolio of the company's own real estate has a value of around CHF 13 billion and consists primarily of commercial and retail properties in the most important Swiss metropolitan regions of the Central Plateau. In addition to the real estate investments, Swiss Prime Site Solutions makes up the real estate asset management segment with assets under management of around CHF 14 billion.

== History ==
The company was founded in 1999 by the pension funds of Credit Suisse and Siemens Switzerland and the then Winterthur Life (now Axa). Swiss Prime Site was listed on the SIX Swiss Exchange in April 2000. At the time, the real estate portfolio had a value of around CHF 500 million.

In 2001, Swiss Prime Site bought a portfolio of office buildings from Swisscom. In 2003, it acquired the Frey Group and in 2004 Maag Holding AG. In 2009, the takeover of the stock listed Jelmoli Holding AG took place. In October 2012, Swiss Prime Site acquired Wincasa AG, a real estate service company in Switzerland, as well as the Tertianum Group. In 2019 Swiss Prime Site announced the sale of the Tertianum Group. At the end of 2021, Swiss Prime Site acquired the Akara Group, and in the beginning of 2024 the asset manager of Fundamenta Group, to strengthen the Services segment. In March 2023, the sale of Wincasa to Implenia was announced.

== Real Estate ==
Completed construction projects: Espace Tourbillon Genf, Basler Messeturm, Opus Zug, the PostFinance Arena and Schönburg in Bern YOND, Sihlcity in Zürich and Roter Turm in Winterthur. as well as the Prime Tower with the Clouds restaurant and its neighboring building. The Prime Tower on the Maag site in Zürich West, is with its total of 126 meters, one of the tallest office buildings in Switzerland.

== Real Estate Asset Management ==
Swiss Prime Site Solutions manages assets with tailor-made products and services, generating added value for its customers throughout the entire life cycle of real estate.

== Management ==
The management consists of Marcel Kucher (CEO since 2026), Martina Moosmann (CFO since 2026) and Anastasius Tschopp (CEO Swiss Prime Site Solutions since 2018).
