= BäreTower =

Skyscraper in Ostermundigen, Switzerland

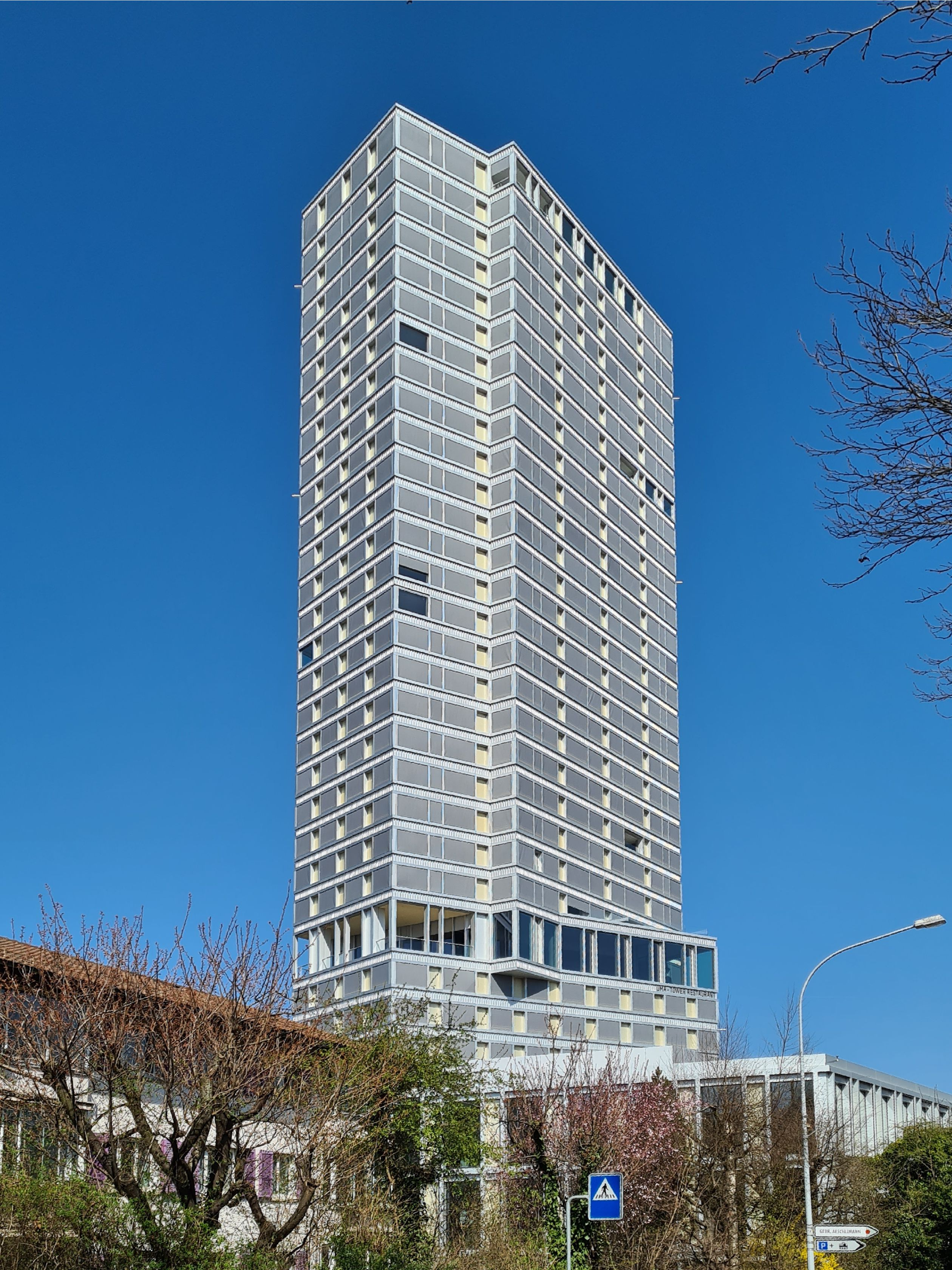
- Interactive map of the BäreTower area

General information
- Status: Completed
- Type: Mixed-use: Residential / Hotel
- Location: Ostermundigen, Switzerland, 25 Bernstrasse, 3072 Ostermundigen, Switzerland
- Coordinates: 46.95601°N 7.48072°E
- Construction started: 2014
- Completed: 2022

Height
- Roof: 101 m (331 ft)

Technical details
- Structural system: Reinforced concrete
- Floor count: 33
- Floor area: 27,000 m^{2} (291,000 sq ft)

Design and construction
- Architect: Burkard Meyer Architekten
- Developer: Halter AG
- Structural engineer: Peri Group

Website
- BäreTower

The BäreTower is a mixed-use high-rise building in Ostermundigen, Switzerland. Built between 2014 and 2022, the tower stands at 101 m (331 ft) tall with 33 floors and is the current 9th tallest building in Switzerland.

== History ==
=== Architecture ===
The tower was designed by Burkard Meyer Architekten and is located in Ostermundigen. The tower shares the residential function with the hotel function, the latter occupying the first four floors of the building. The ninth floor displays a restaurant with a terrase used for overlooking and as an observation deck. The building houses a total of 152 apartment units. On the first 18 floors, the units are distributed as five per floor, while at the top nine floors, only four but larger apartments per floor are given.

The tower is a slim, multifaceted skyscraper that acts as a statement in the city and brings a new size to the current layout of buildings. The towering high-rise structure looms over a four-story pedestal and stands perpendicular to the railway line, overlooking the neighboring open area. Adding a second, plinth-shaped building on Bernstrasse results in the creation of a public square, improving the appeal of the area while considering future developments near the railway station, beginning in the planned urban densification of the outskirts of Bern.

The tower is made up of clean and functional materials arranged in horizontal lines. The slim outline of the building is enhanced by the relief-like aluminum cladding facade. Corrugated aluminum parapets enveloping the outer surface, alternating with uneven rows of windows, are enhancing the structural shape.

== See also ==
- List of tallest buildings in Switzerland
