= Meret Oppenheim Tower =

Skyscraper in Basel, Switzerland

- Meret Oppenheim Hochhaus (German)
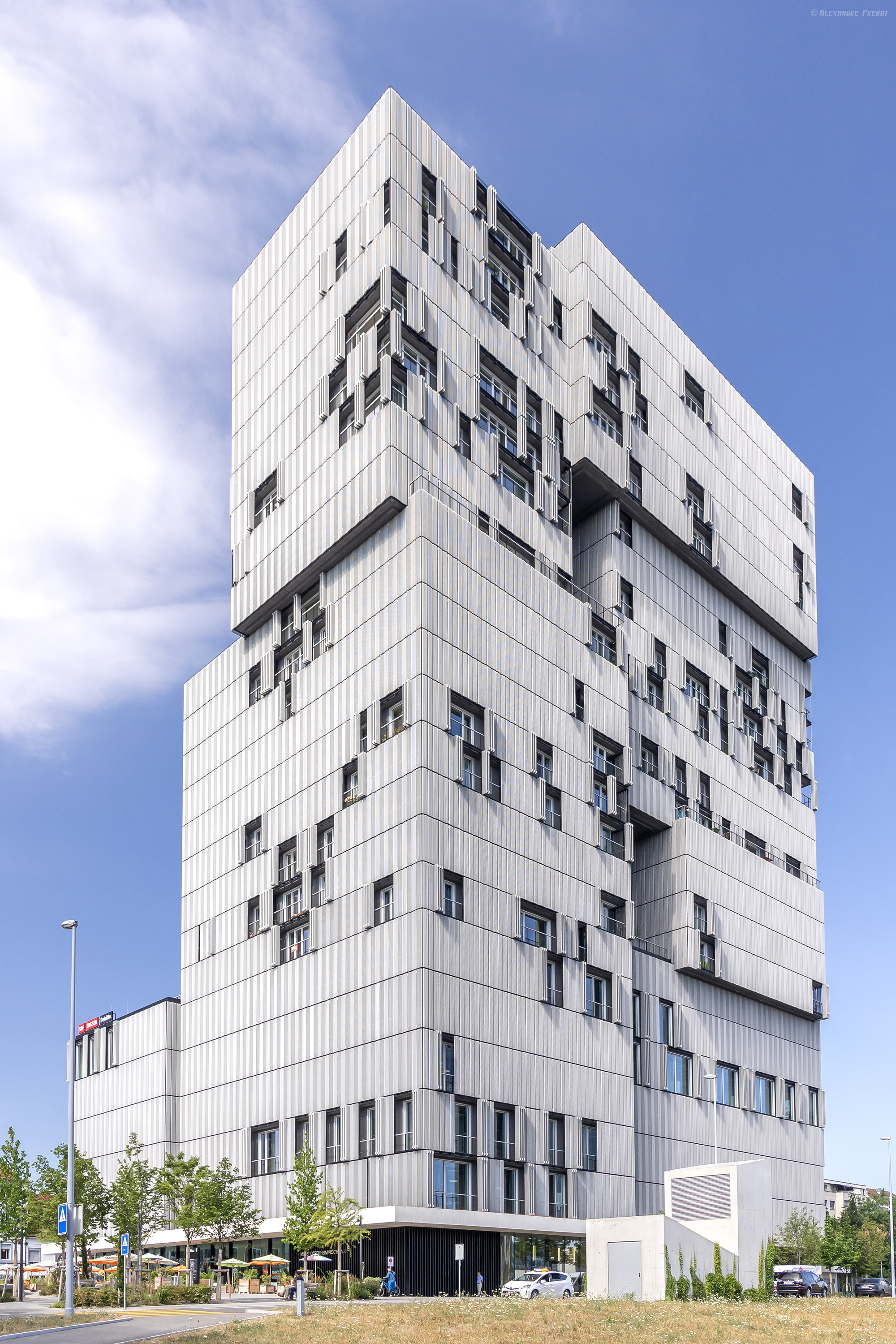
- Interactive map of the Meret Oppenheim Tower area

General information
- Status: Completed
- Type: Mixed-use: Residential / Office
- Architectural style: Neomodern
- Location: Basel, Switzerland, Meret Oppenheim-Platz 1, 4053 Basel, Switzerland
- Coordinates: 47.54594°N 7.58706°E
- Construction started: 2016
- Completed: 2019

Height
- Roof: 85 m (279 ft)

Technical details
- Structural system: Reinforced concrete
- Floor count: 25
- Floor area: 40,000 m^{2} (431,000 sq ft)

Design and construction
- Architect: Herzog & de Meuron
- Structural engineer: Drees & Sommer Advanced Building (MEP); WGG Schnetzer Puskas Ingenieure AG (Structural)

Website
- Meret Oppenheim Hochhaus

The Meret Oppenheim Tower (German: Meret Oppenheim Hochhaus) is a mixed-use high-rise building in Basel, Switzerland. Built between 2016 and 2019, the tower stands at 85 m (279 ft) tall with 25 floors and is the current 27th tallest building in Switzerland. The building is named after the German-Swiss artist Meret Oppenheim, after whom the street on which the high-rise is located was also named.

== History ==
The building is located in the immediate vicinity of the Basel SBB train station. The building, which will be ready for occupancy in spring 2019, will be the third-tallest in the city at the time of completion and is located in the Gundeldingen district . In addition to a restaurant, the Meret Oppenheim high-rise contains both offices and residential spaces. The building houses an editorial base for Swiss Radio and Television. The architects of the Meret Oppenheim high-rise are the Basel-based firm Herzog & de Meuron. The square between the tower and the southern station entrance via the footbridge is also called Meret-Oppenheim-Platz.

After the excavation was completed in early 2016, the foundation stone was laid on 24 June 2016. The topping-out ceremony took place on 19 April 2018. Construction work was completed at the end of 2018. The forecourt was completely finished at the beginning of 2019, and the building itself has been ready for occupancy since January 2019.

=== Architecture ===
The Meret Oppenheim high-rise is a six-storey low-rise building, on which some slightly offset cubic storeys are attached. The lower part is intended for the restaurant and the Basel studio of Swiss television . The floors above are to be reserved for apartments. Terraces are to be visible behind movable facade elements. Openings in the cubic basic structure are intended to give the building a certain lightness.

The high-rise is part of a fundamental renovation of the area south of the tracks of the SBB train station. The entire project development was carried out by SBB Immobilien under the overall project management of Daniel Strolz. To the east of the building, Meret-Oppenheim-Platz is to be created as a forecourt area that will break up the densely built-up area.

The movable facade elements consist of hand-riveted wing parts, mounted on carriages, which can be motorized in two guide rails using a gear spindle combination. The railings on the loggias are integrated into the facade construction. A moving facade element consists of four to six wings. A wing consists of up to ten bent individual parts made of aluminum, which are held together with 415 rivets. On a moving facade element with six wings, this results in 2490 rivets, which were riveted by hand. In sub-zero temperatures and snowfall, the facade panels are automatically closed for safety reasons so that no lumps of ice adhering to them can fall down and injure people.

=== Construction ===
The Meret Oppenheim high-rise building has a plot area of 3,100 square meters and will have a total floor area of 40,000 square meters. Of this, 784 square meters will be used for catering, 219 square meters for storage, 11,752 square meters for offices and 12,460 square meters for living. The building will have 66 parking spaces for cars, 556 bicycles and eight motorcycles.

In addition to its use as a residential high-rise, the Schweizer Radio und Fernsehe has its studio in Basel in the Meret-Oppenheim high-rise. 320 Swiss television employees work there in the created culture, science and religion department. The editorial team produces television, radio and online reports. The reports, an average of five per day, are produced and distributed on site. The first broadcast was broadcast from the Meret-Oppenheim high-rise on May 7, 2019.

== Reception ==
Since the facade of the Meret Oppenheimer high-rise was lined, opposition to the building has grown in Basel. It has been criticized as "grey," "clunky," and an "overwhelming monolithic megastructure." In the Neue Zürcher Zeitung, the grey skin was described as elephant-like and included in a discussion about the "elephant in the urban space." The Basel Architecture Association noted that the criticism comes at an inopportune time. At least there was an opportunity to inspect the building before construction began. The project cleared all democratic and legal hurdles without referendums or objections being held against the construction. The argument that the building looks like a "high-security wing" is explained by the fact that all movable facade panels are closed before the time of occupancy. As soon as the building is inhabited and these are opened up accordingly, a visually differentiated and more varied image will emerge. Despite the partly questionable criticism, the association criticized the architects' "noble restraint". In a direct democracy, this was out of place. The architects had a responsibility to become more involved and to conduct a real discourse.

== Gallery ==
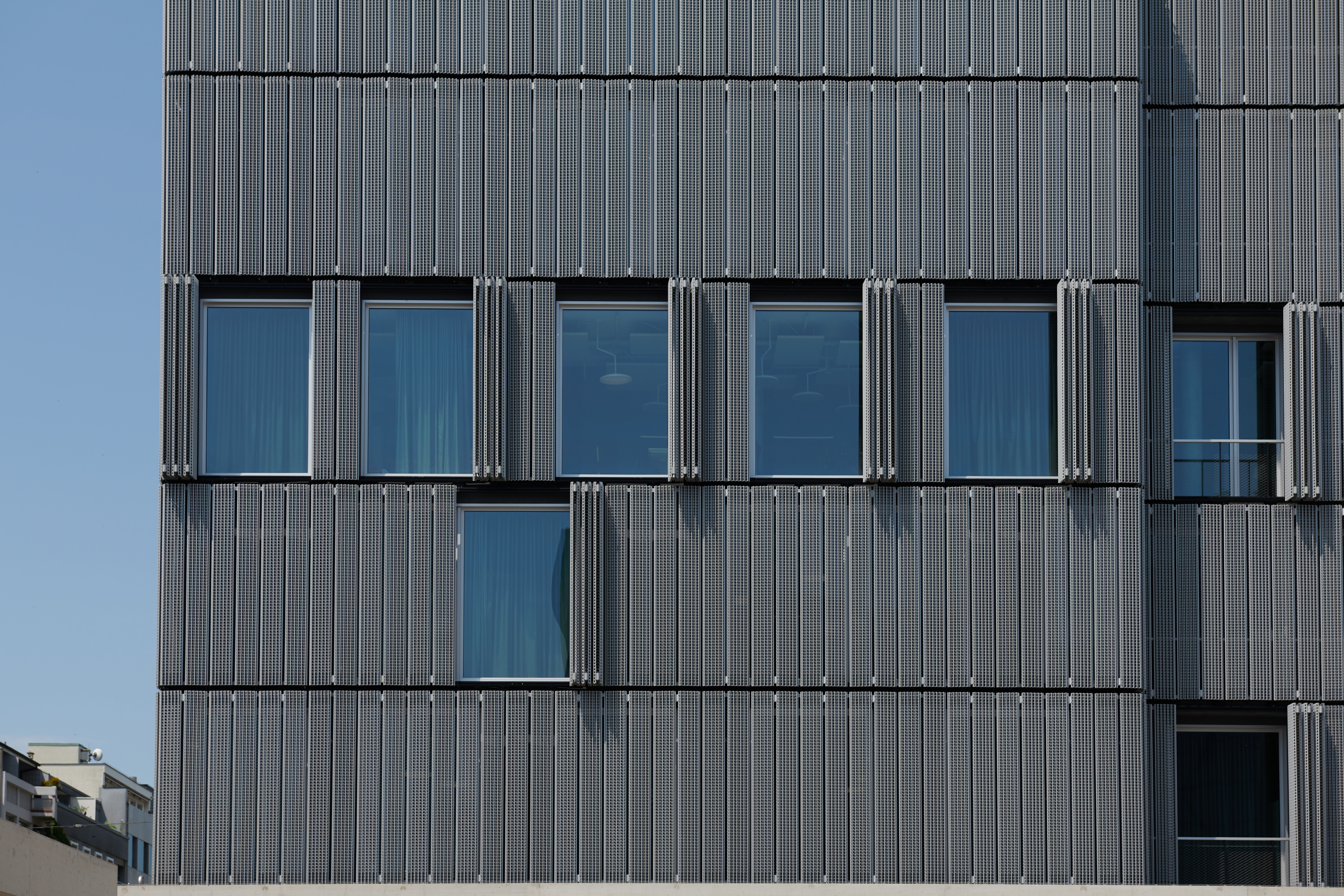
Facade detail

== See also ==
- List of tallest buildings in Switzerland
