= Sulzer Tower =

Skyscraper in Winterthur, Switzerland

- Sulzer-Hochhaus (German)
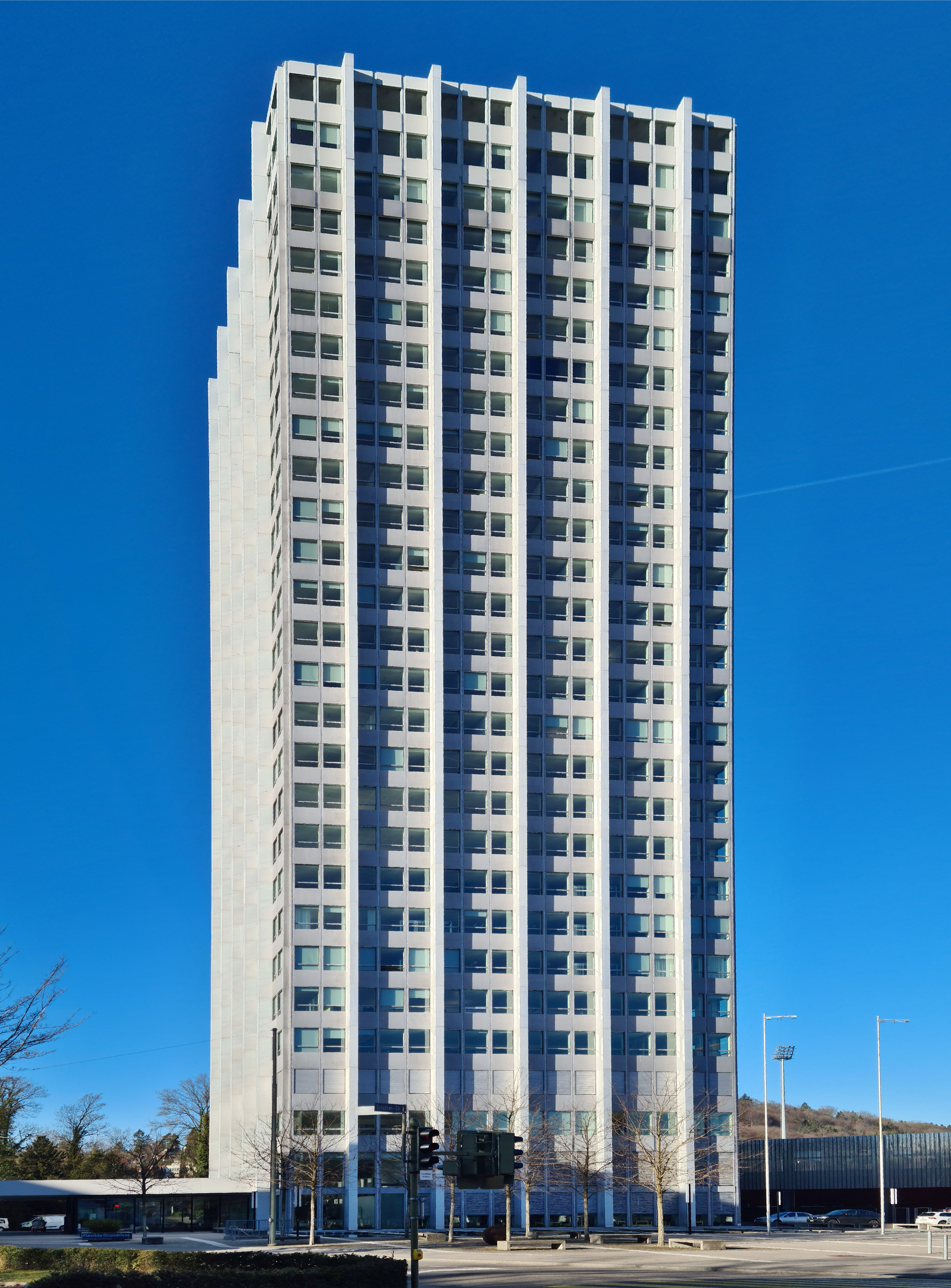
- Sulzer tower in 2022
- Interactive map of the Sulzer Tower area

General information
- Status: Completed
- Type: Office
- Location: Winterthur, Switzerland, 15 Neuwiesenstrasse, Winterthur, Switzerland
- Coordinates: 47.49998°N 8.71809°E
- Construction started: 1962
- Completed: 1966
- Owner: Sulzer (former); Wintower Immobilien AG (actual)

Height
- Roof: 99.7 m (327 ft)

Technical details
- Structural system: Reinforced concrete
- Floor count: 28
- Lifts/elevators: Schindler Group

Design and construction
- Architect: Suter + Suter

Website
- Wintower

The Sulzer Tower (German: Sulzer-Hochhaus) also known as the Wintower is a high-rise office building in Winterthur, Switzerland. Built between 1962 and 1966, the tower srands at 99.7 m (327 ft) with 28 floors and is the current 10th tallest building in Switzerland. It formerly served as the headquarters of the Swiss industrial engineering firm Sulzer and was the first-ever high-rise building in the country.

== History ==
=== Positioning ===
The Sulzer high-rise building is located in the Neuwiesen district of Winterthur on an open area west of Neuwiesenstrasse. The building is bordered to the north-east by a park with a water basin belonging to the building itself as part of its own residential complex and the Schützenstrasse Street behind it. The Schützenwiese Stadium is positioned to the north-west of the building in the immediate vicinity, while to the west there is the Eulach river. The Winterthur train station and the old town are just a few minutes walk east of the building. Due to its architectural style, the building is the most observable edifice in the district and, as one of the tallest buildings in Switzerland, it is also a landmark of Winterthur.

=== Architecture ===
The Sulzer Tower was built between 1962 and 1966 for the Sulzer AG company, according to plans by the Basel architects Suter & Suter. The outdoor facilities, which are now listed as monument buildings, were designed by the Swiss landscape architect Ernst Cramer. Originally, upon its completion, the building stood at 92.4 m (303 ft) tall with 26 floors, and was the tallest building in the country until the completion of the Hardau Residential Complex from 1978, of which the tallest tower measured 95 m (312 ft) tall. It was not until the Basler Messeturm in 2003 when a significantly taller building was built in Switzerland.

The building soon attracted great interest throughout Switzerland and represented Winterthur's move into the modern era. The development was originally intended to be a double high-rise complex, however the land plot purchased adjacently was never used for a second building.

After its completion, the Sulzer building served as the headquarters of the industrial group Sulzer AG for 40 years. After some major changes in the Sulzer Group took place in the late 1990s, the building became redundant and was unused for years, except for floor-by-floor rentals. At the time, it subsequently became a symbol of the decline of the industry in Winterthur. On December 31, 1998, Wintower Immobilien AG acquired the building. The company's sole shareholder was the private Foundation for Art, Culture and History, whose president at the time was Swiss real estate investor Bruno Stefanini. The purchasing price was in fact only the price of the land from which the demolition costs were extracted.

=== Renovation ===
In the following years, the already poor structural condition of the high-rise worsened. Beginning with 2002, the building was completely empty. In a protest against the "luxury renovation of living space", around 200 people occupied the building on the night of February 28, 2004. Amidst the protests, a big part of the building's interior was damaged. In May 2005, a fake leaflet announcing the impending demolition of the Sulzer building caused unrest.

The building was extensively renovated in the spring of 2005. Asbestos was removed, the building services were renewed, the thermal insulation was improved and the windows and elevators were replaced. The new routing of the elevators to the top floor required the reconstruction of the roof. The original 24-story building received one additional floor over renovation alongside a new roof structure. The building was accordingly raised to 99.7 meters with renovation costs amounted to 40 million Swiss francs.

After renovation, the building prepared some spaces for Finnish company Wärtsilä, however, the latters never moved in. On October 17, 2012, it was announced that Sulzer AG was renting the top 14 floors as office space for its headquarters.Sulzer moved in with around 360 employees in October 2013. As of 2019, the lower floors are still empty, the upper floors are rented to various tenants, including Sulzer.

== Trivia ==
In the evenings and mornings of the Advent weekends and at the New Year's Eve, the Sulzer building is illuminated from the inside on all sides according to the theme. This tradition began shortly after the building was constructed, at that time still manually by closing the shutters. After an interruption due to a change of ownership and the renovation of the high-rise, the tradition has been continued since 2008.

On 1 April 2019, the local newspaper Der Landbote announced as an April Fool's joke that the skyscraper would be used as a fan hotel, as FC Winterthur had presumably signed a partnership agreement with FC Barcelona. The Spanish club however is indeed related to Winterthur as its founder, businessman Joan Gamper was a town's native.

== Gallery ==
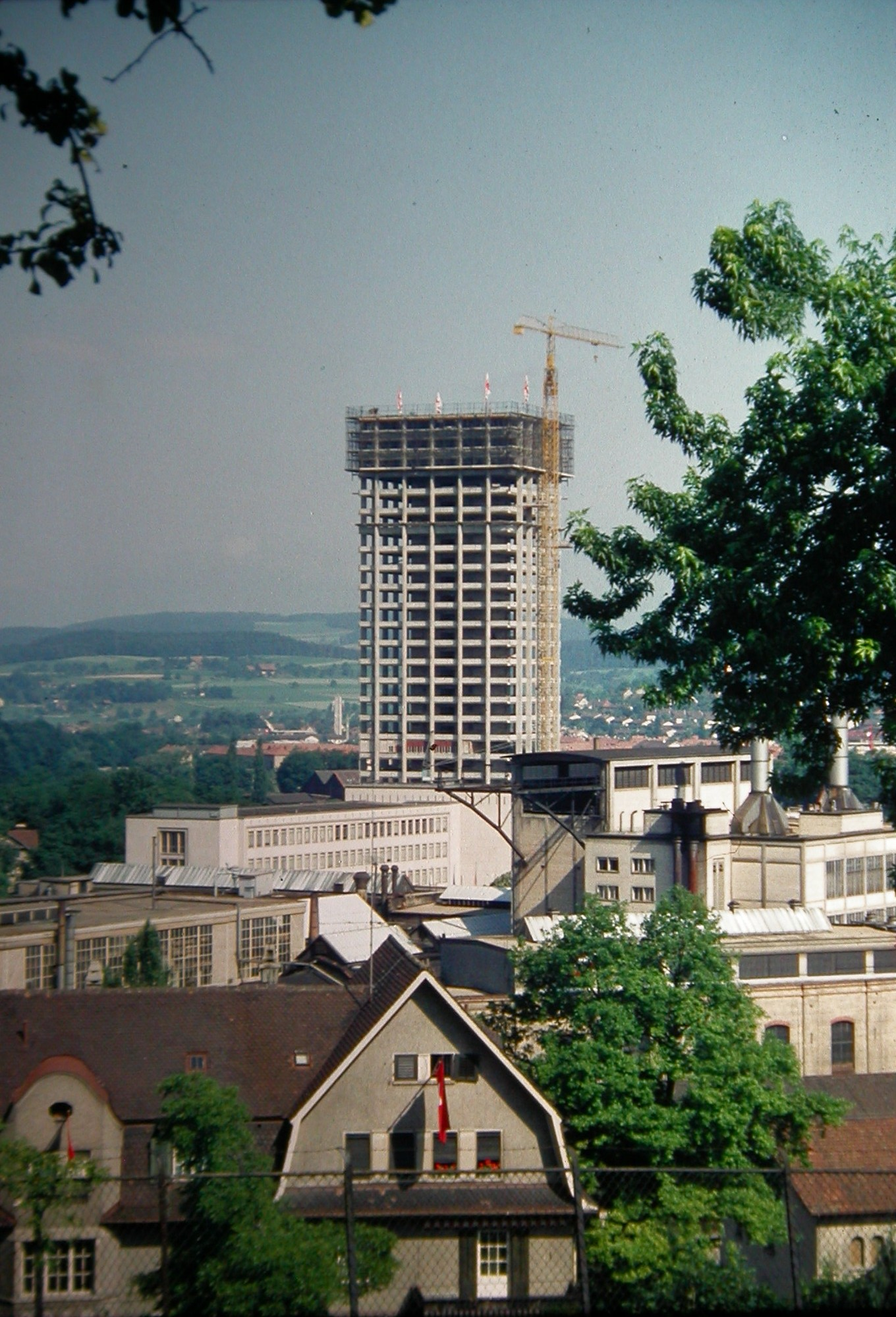
Sulzer building under construction (1964)

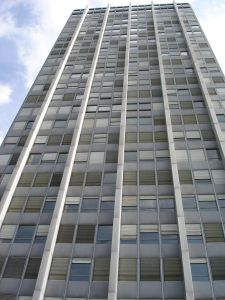
The building shortly before renovations (2005)

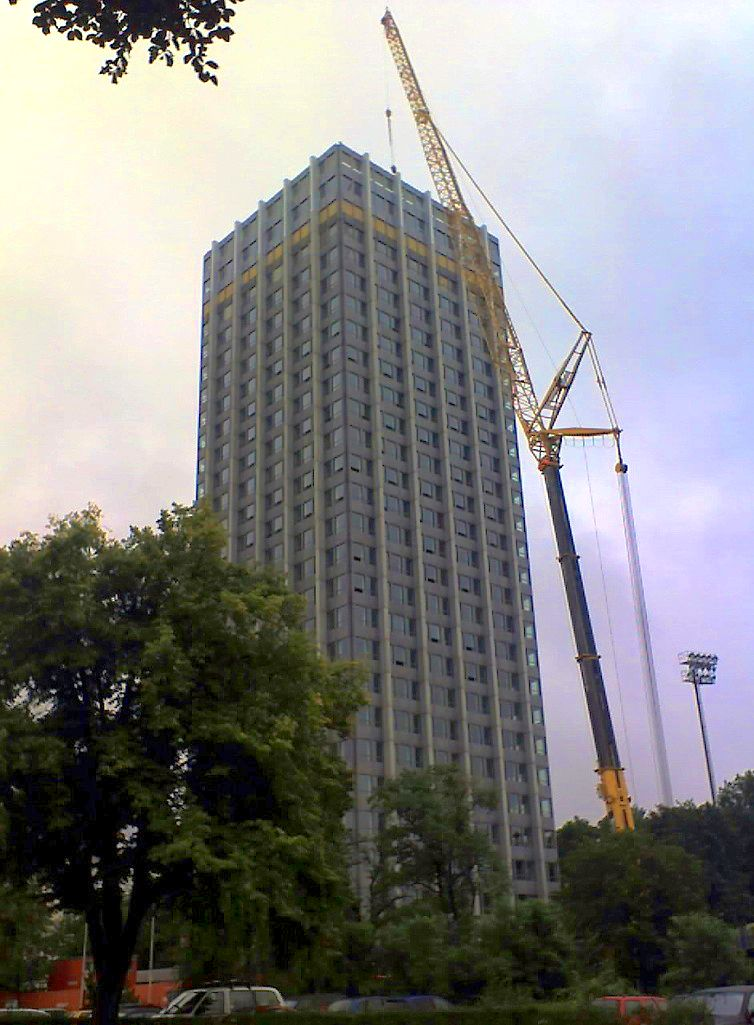
the building during the final extension (2007)

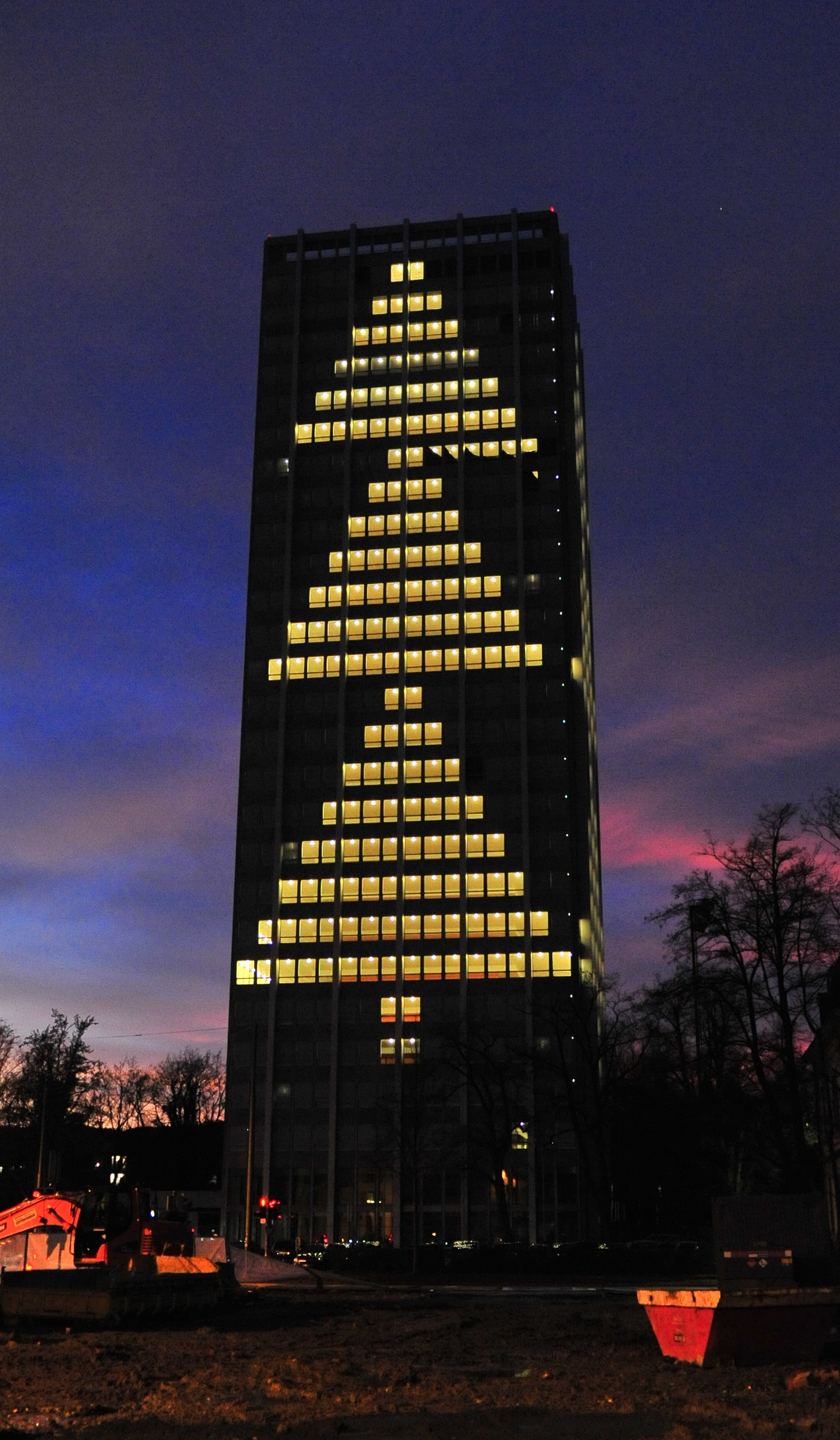
The building during Christmas season (2012)

== See also ==
- List of tallest buildings in Switzerland
