= Basler Messeturm =

Building in Basel, Switzerland

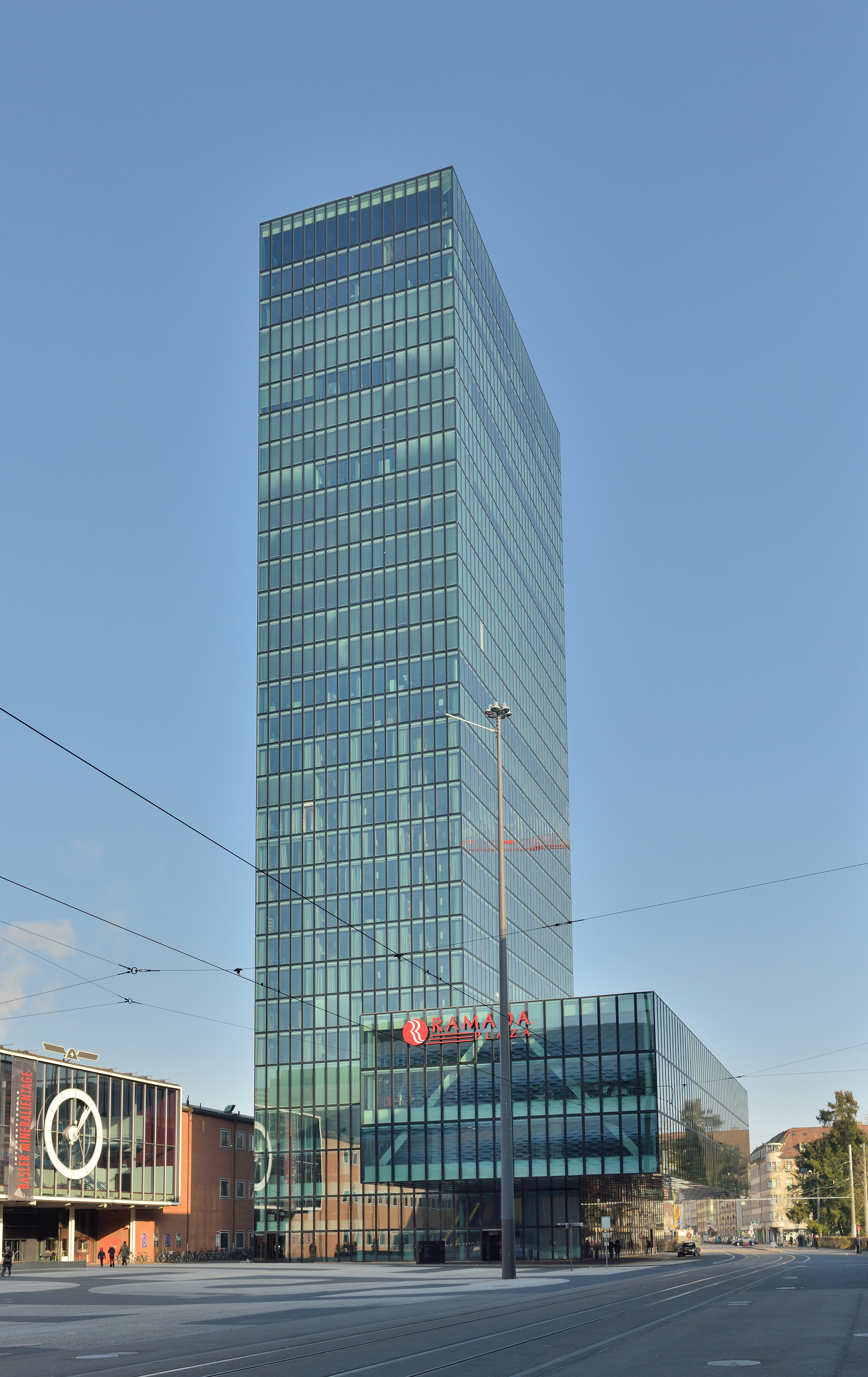
- Interactive map of the Basler Messeturm area

Record height
- Preceded by: Sulzer Tower

General information
- Status: Open
- Type: Mixed-use: Hotel / Office
- Architectural style: Modernism
- Location: Basel, Switzerland, Messeplatz
- Coordinates: 47.56452°N 7.60240°E
- Completed: 2003

Height
- Height: 105 m (344 ft)

Technical details
- Floor count: 32
- Floor area: 74,200 m^{2} (799,000 sq ft)

The Basler Messeturm (also known as the Basel Trade Fair Tower) is a mixed-use high-rise building in Basel, Switzerland. Completed in 2003, the tower stands at 105 metres (344 ft) with 32 floors and is currently the seventh-tallest building in Switzerland.

A bar lounge occupies the top floor. The Hyperion hotel operates a 200-room four-star hotel in the building, which also includes offices.

== History ==
In September 2000, Swiss Prime Site was selected as the investor for the Basler Messeturm, planned at Messeplatz in Basel. Developed by Messe Basel, the project was scheduled for completion by mid-2003. Messe Basel was named as the primary tenant. The building permit application had already been submitted in July 2000, and construction was expected to begin in July 2001. A framework agreement was signed between Messe Basel, the canton of Basel-Stadt, and Swiss Prime Site.

When completed in 2003, the tower became the first building in Switzerland to exceed 100 metres in height, standing five metres taller than the spire of the Bern Minster. At the time, Swissinfo noted that “something is changing in Switzerland,” as new tower projects were being launched in cities like Basel and Zurich after decades of restrictive building regulations.

In 2021, Basler Zeitung reported that the Messeturm had undergone an interior renovation led by Swiss Prime Site. A central focus of the redesign was sustainability, with features such as recyclable materials, flexible partition walls, and air-purifying plants.
