= Hardau Residential Complex =

Skyscrapers in Zürich, Switzerland

- Wohnsiedlung Hardau (German)
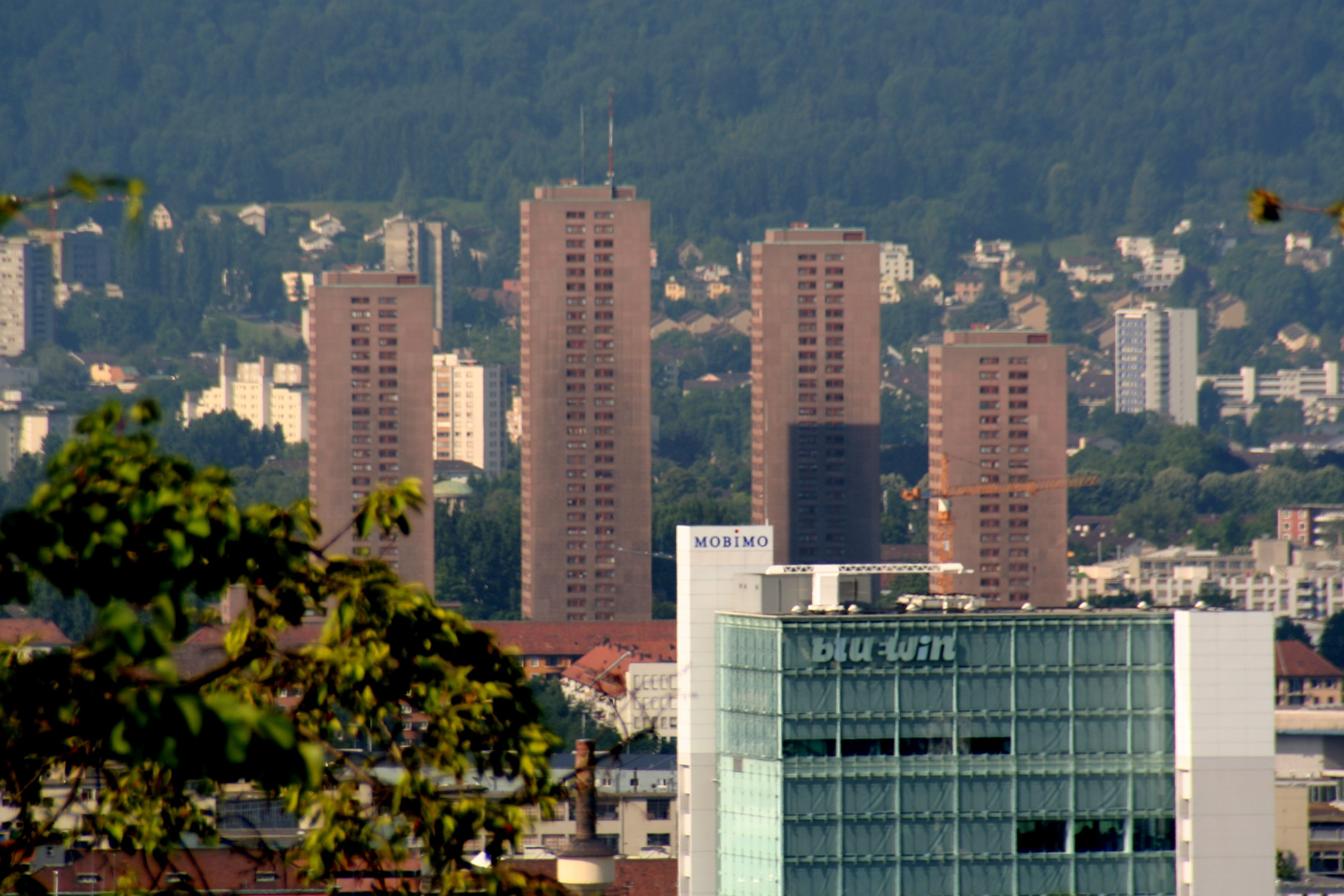
- Interactive map of the Hardau Residential Complex area

General information
- Status: Completed
- Type: Residential
- Location: Zürich, Switzerland, 70 Bullingerstrasse, Zürich, Switzerland
- Coordinates: 47.38088°N 8.50982°E
- Construction started: 1976
- Completed: 1978

Height
- Roof: 95.4 m (313 ft) (highest: Tower 1)

Technical details
- Structural system: Concrete
- Floor count: 33 (highest: Tower 1)

Design and construction
- Architect: Max P. Kollbrunner

The Hardau Residential Complex (German: Hardau Hochhaus or Wohnsiedlung Hardau II) is a high-rise residential complex in Zürich, Switzerland. Built between 1976 and 1978, the complex consists of four towers, with the tallest one (Tower 1 or Bullingerstrasse 73) standing at 95.4 m (313 ft) tall with 33 floors which is the second tallest building in Zürich and the 13th tallest building in Switzerland.

== History ==
=== Site ===
The residential development is located next to the smaller Hardau I complex developed in the 1960s. Hardau II consists of a total of four residential high-rises with 21 to 31 habitable floors, two four-story residential blocks with five apartment buildings each, a retirement community of the same height with a staff house and a retirement home. The properties in the development include a total of 573 apartments, a kindergarten, various neighborhood facilities and ground floor commercial spaces.

The highest residential tower (Bullingerstrasse 73), stands at an official height of 95.4 metres. It was the tallest building in the city of Zürich and subsequently in Switzerland between 1978 and 2011 when the Prime Tower was completed, and still one of the tallest residential buildings in the country. It is located in the Hard quarter on Bullingerstrasse or Norastrasse of District 4, situated in the western part of Zürich. The Letzigrund Stadium is located in the immediate vicinity to the west of the development.

=== Architecture ===
All the four towers display a square floor plan were built by the architect Max P. Kollbrunner between 1976 and 1978 as part of the first Swiss high-rise boom. The target group was older couples and individuals. Accordingly, the majority of the apartments were 2½-room apartments. The settlement was intended to alleviate the housing shortage and to offer a smaller apartment to parents with adult children who wanted to move, as well as older people who wanted to stay in the area.

The enthusiasm for high-rise buildings gradually waned in the following years; the development became slums because it was not attractive enough for families with children. In 1984, an initiative adopted by the people put a political end to the construction of high-rise buildings in Zurich's inner city. From 2000 onwards, taller buildings were again built in the area surrounding the Hardau development. The city of Zurich, as the owner of the Hardau buildings, combined a necessary renovation of the building technology with the creation of large apartments by combining smaller units. New kitchens, new paint and other adjustments upgraded the development between 2006 and 2007. Along with the general upgrading of the surrounding area, the reputation of the development also changed.

== Buildings ==
Name	Image	Floors	Height m (ft)	Ref
Tower 1 (Bullingerstrasse 73)		33	95.4 m (313 ft)	
Tower 2 (Bullingerstrasse 63)		27	86 m (282 ft)	
Tower 3 (Bullingerstrasse 60)		23	72 m (236 ft)	
Tower 4		23	69 m (226 ft)	

== See also ==
- List of tallest buildings in Switzerland
