= Brickstone =

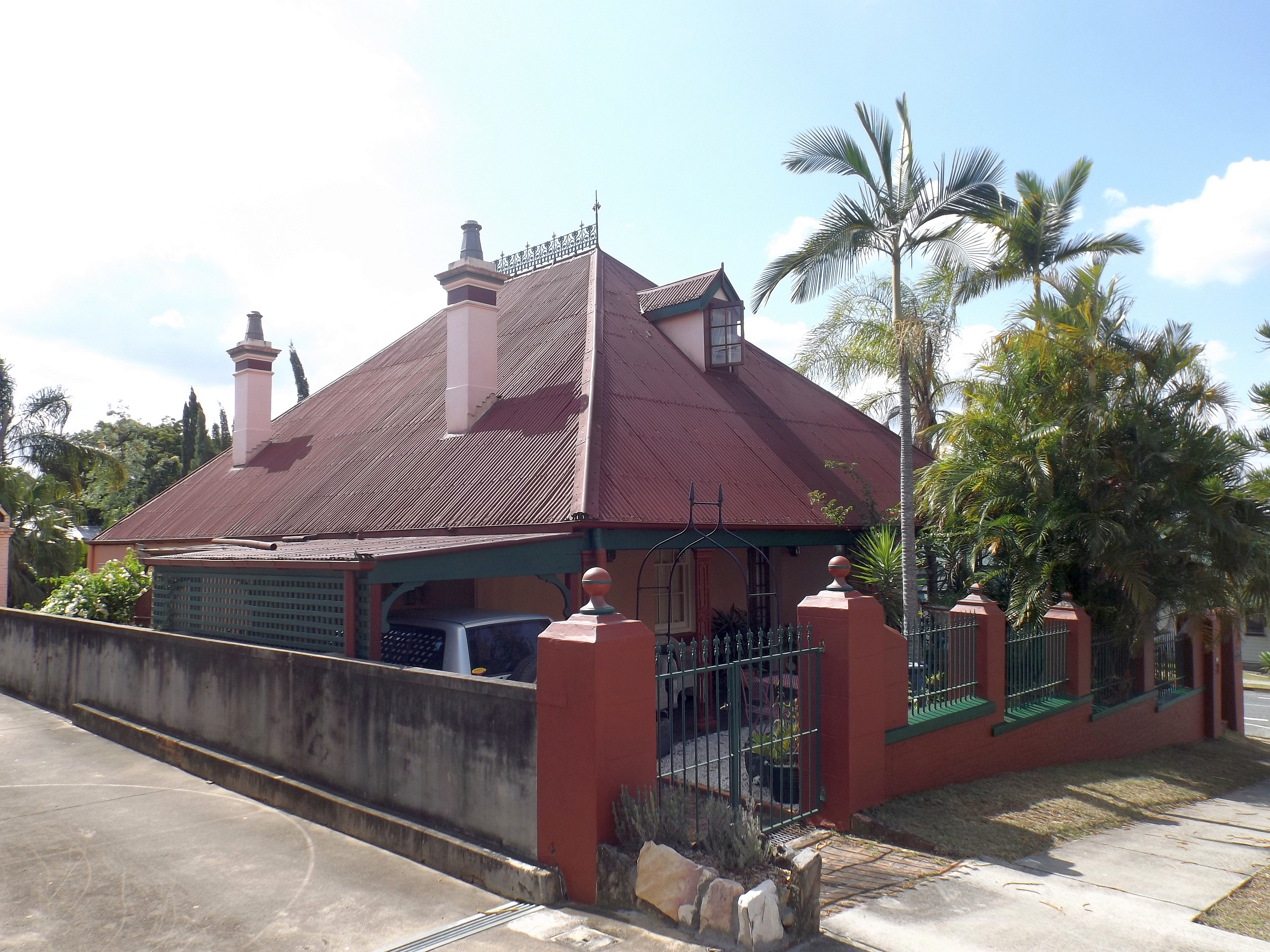
- Murphy Street view, 2015

- Location within Queensland Location within Australia
- 27.6168°S 152.7554°E
- Location: 11 Murphy Street, Ipswich, City of Ipswich, Queensland, Australia

History
- Design period: 1840s–1860s (mid-19th century)
- Built: c. 1864
- Built for: James Kirby Swan

Site notes
- Architectural style: Georgian

Queensland Heritage Register
- Official name: Brickstone, Brixton
- Type: state heritage (built)
- Designated: 21 October 1992
- Reference no.: 600590
- Significant period: 1860s (fabric); 1860s–1870s (historical)
- Significant components: residential accommodation – main house, cellar, kitchen/kitchen house, attic
- Builders: William Hancock

Brickstone is a heritage-listed detached house at 11 Murphy Street, Ipswich, City of Ipswich, Queensland, Australia. It was built c. 1864 by William Hancock. It is also known as Brixton. It was added to the Queensland Heritage Register on 21 October 1992.

== History ==
This two-storey house with an attic stands on allotment 10 of section 17 proclaimed on 4 March 1861. On 15 April 1861 a section of the allotment was purchased as lot 53 by Mr. James Kirby Swan, a local wheelwright and town land owner. By 1869 a number of sections had been surveyed off the original allotment and all that remained was the section where the house stands, part 3A. The house was constructed by prominent local builder William Hancock. The precise date of the construction of this house is unknown; however, Swan's name does appear on the 1864 electoral role as residing at this address, thus indicating that the house may have been built for him in the early 1860s. On 15 January 1863 Hancock purchased land adjoining that of Swan's, part 3 of allotment 10 of section 17. The Hancock family history states that William Hancock built three houses in a line in Murphy Street being numbers 11, 13 and 15 Murphy Street. (This also suggests that the house at 11 Murphy Street may have been built in the early part of the 1860s.) The house at 13 was called "Cornubia" and was Hancock's own residence but has been altered beyond recognition. Hancock actually resided at 11 Murphy Street in late 1875 for a short period (rates, levied at 10% of the valuation of the land, were paid in Swan's name until 4 October 1875 when the land was registered in the name of William Hancock).

William Hancock migrated from England in 1856 and worked for a short time in Brisbane prior to moving to Ipswich where he lived until his death on 23 August 1892. Hancock was born at St Ives, Cornwall, went to live in Yorkshire, and was married at Leeds in 1844. Hancock was well known in Ipswich as a "builder in brick" and building contractor and was involved in the construction of a number of buildings including, additions to Rockton Villa, Colinton Station, Booval House, the foundations of the first railway workshop, the Lands Office and the Wesleyan Parsonage as well as laying pipes for the waterworks in 1877. He also built and operated a lime-kiln on Limestone Hill and owned a soap and candle works at Churchill.

The house was built in a time of growth and expansion for Ipswich which was benefiting from the profits of coal mining and wool and cotton production. The town was a point of trade with the Port on the Bremer River and the first railway in Queensland opening to Grandchester in 1865. William Hancock had directly contributed to this early growth in Ipswich and Brickstone can be seen as part of that contribution.

The house, which has three levels, originally had eight main rooms with a detached kitchen and laundry. In 1877 the house was sold to Mr Samuel Irwin, and since then there have been numerous other owners and occupants, including William Hancock's married daughter Elizabeth; and her unmarried daughter who lived there till she died in 1956.

From around the 1920s until 1982 the house was mainly used as flats during which time the house underwent a number of alterations, the most noticeable being the closure of the attic and removal of the stairs during the 1920s and the enclosure of the verandah. The grey slate roof was replaced by galvanised iron and the attic windows were removed around the same time. (Possibly a similar example of what the original slate roof would have looked can be seen at 15 Murphy Street.)

In 1985 the house was purchased by Kirk Jensen and Peter Gelherr who reversed the conversion of the flats and redecorated and remodelled the interior of the house in a High Victorian style. The staircase to the attic was replaced with a recycled set of stairs from auction and the attic reopened with dormer windows put in on three sides of the roof. Almost all of the interior fittings and decoration have been added to the house during the 1980s renovations.

In 1989 the house was sold to Mrs Adele Rule, who resided there until sold once again in 2012, to a local couple who have maintained the home and reside there still (as at 2018).

While the origins of the name "Brickstone" are unknown, the house is believed to have been known as "Brixton" prior to renovations.

== Description ==
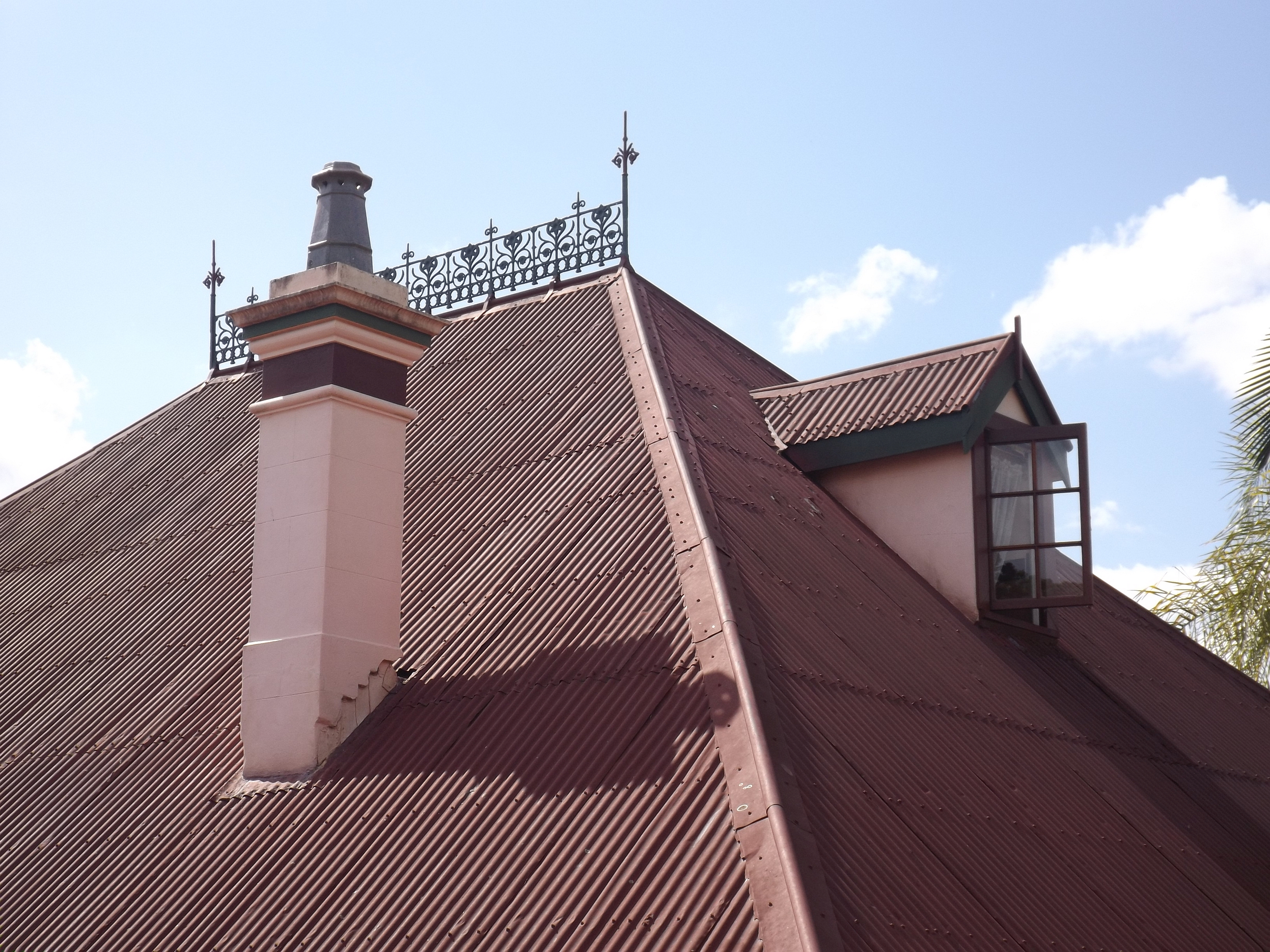
Rooftop, 2015

Brickstone is a substantial brick dwelling with a steeply pitched roof which makes it an important contribution to the streetscape. The house has three levels and is made of load bearing brick rendered with ruled joints. It has a monopitch hip roof with a central gable to the front verandah and four dormer windows to the attic space. The current dormer windows were constructed in the 1980s when the attic was reopened after the house was converted from flats. New entry stairs were also added at this time to the verandah under the central gable. Earlier photographs show the verandah accessed from the corner stair.

The main level consists of a four-room core with a central hall surrounded by a verandah, which is open on two sides. The rear and part of the side verandahs were enclosed to form servant's rooms which are now bathrooms and storerooms. The stair was installed during the 1980s, originally from another building (apparently from a former doctor's residence at Ipswich Hospital). The majority of the joinery has been replaced, sourced from other demolished buildings, and ceiling roses added to many rooms. The iron columns and balustrading are largely intact on the verandahs.

The lower level contains two large rooms and a cellar. The joinery has been replaced and ceiling roses and other decorative plasterwork added. The attic was reconstructed in the 1980s with sheeted wall and ceiling linings and dormer windows.

A detached building said to contain the original kitchen and wash- house stands to the rear of the house, accessed from the lower level terrace. A new carport and covered walkway has been added at the side of the property.

== Heritage listing ==
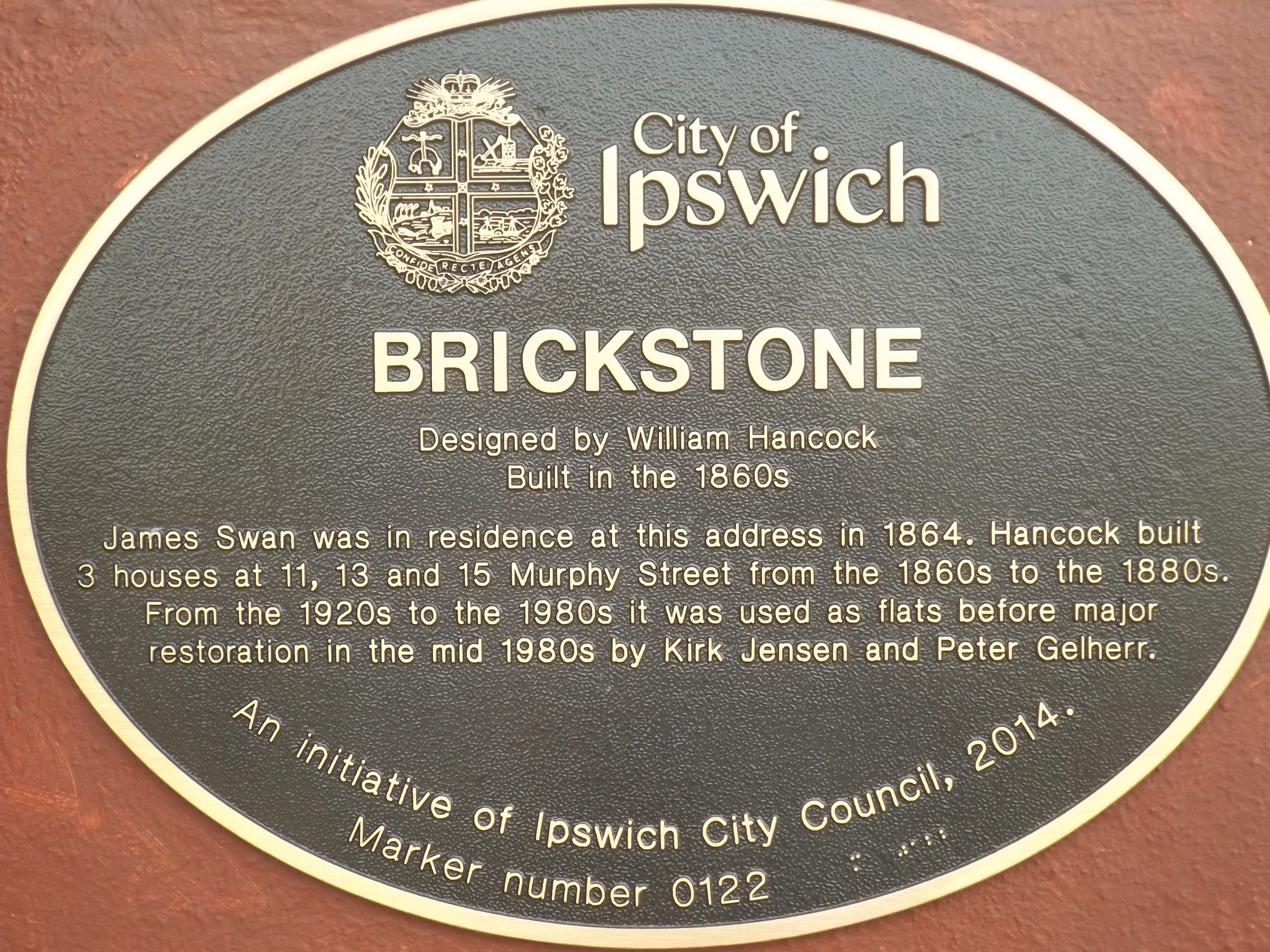
Ipswich City Council plaque, 2015

Brickstone was listed on the Queensland Heritage Register on 21 October 1992 having satisfied the following criteria.

The place is important in demonstrating the evolution or pattern of Queensland's history.

'Brickstone' (11 Murphy Street) is important in demonstrating the pattern of Queensland's history in that it reflects the beginnings of the substantial residential development in Ipswich around the area known as Denmark Hill. Constructed in the early 1860s this brick house reflects the growing strength of Ipswich as an industrial, pastoral and commercial centre in the latter 19th Century which encouraged the suburban development still evident in central Ipswich today.

The place is important because of its aesthetic significance.

'Brickstone' also draws aesthetic significance from its contribution to the immediate streetscape and, more generally to the lower slopes of Denmark Hill. In particular the large scale of the house on a prominent corner block and the steeply pitched roof make Brickstone a local landmark.

The place has a special association with the life or work of a particular person, group or organisation of importance in Queensland's history.

'Brickstone' has a special association with the life and work of prominent local builder William Hancock who constructed the house and later resided there for a short period. Hancock was a prolific "builder in brick" and his work is evident in other substantial residences in Ipswich such as Rockton Villa and Booval House.
