= Winterthur Group =

Axa Winterthur is a multinational insurance company. The original company named Winterthur was founded in Winterthur, Switzerland, in 1875. From 1997 to June 2006, Winterthur was a Credit Suisse (CS) subsidiary. Paris-based Axa Insurance entered into a definitive agreement to purchase Winterthur group from CS for approximately CHF 12 billion. From 2007 onward, Axa merged the companies. Due to the takeover, Axa Insurance took over the brand name and general supervision of the company. Logo changes started to appear in Barcelona during January 2007.

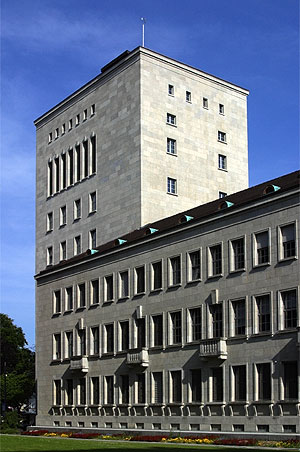
Old headquarters in Winterthur

Winterthur has subsidiaries in Germany, the United Kingdom, Belgium, the Netherlands, Hungary, Poland, the Czech Republic, the United States, Slovakia, Japan, Taiwan, Hong Kong, and Luxembourg. In addition, it has subsidiaries in Spain, although Axa are based in Madrid and Winterthur are based in Barcelona.

On 14 June 2006 Crédit Suisse sold the remaining activities of Winterthur assurances (Winterthur Europe Assurances) to the French group Axa for 12.3 billion Swiss francs (7.9 billion euros). Axa Suisse and Winterthur merged, becoming Axa-Winterthur.

== Gallery ==
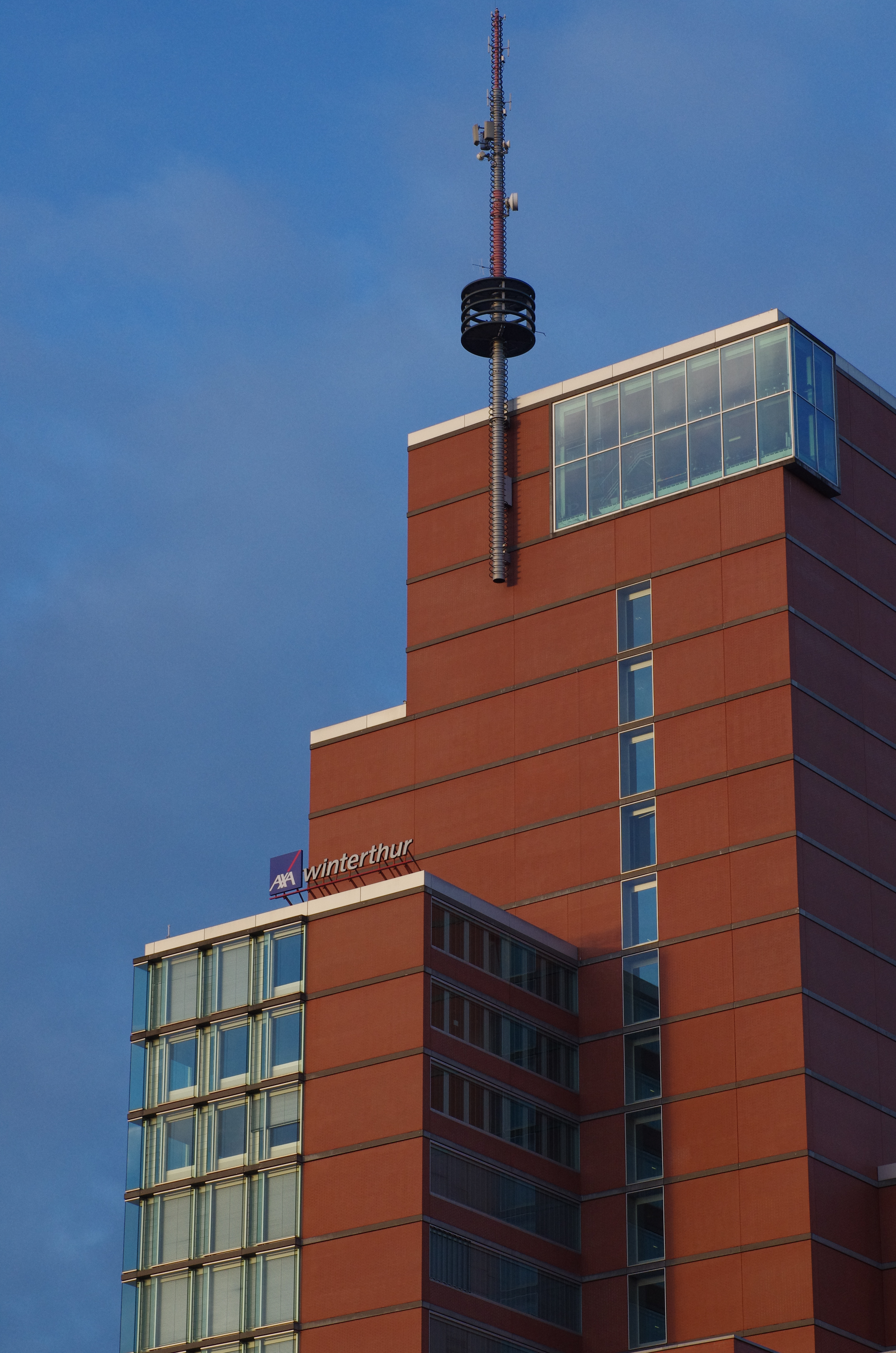
Axa Winterthur "Roter Turm" building in Winterthur.

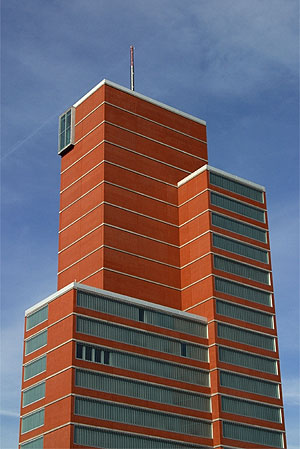
Axa Winterthur, another view of the "Red Tower".

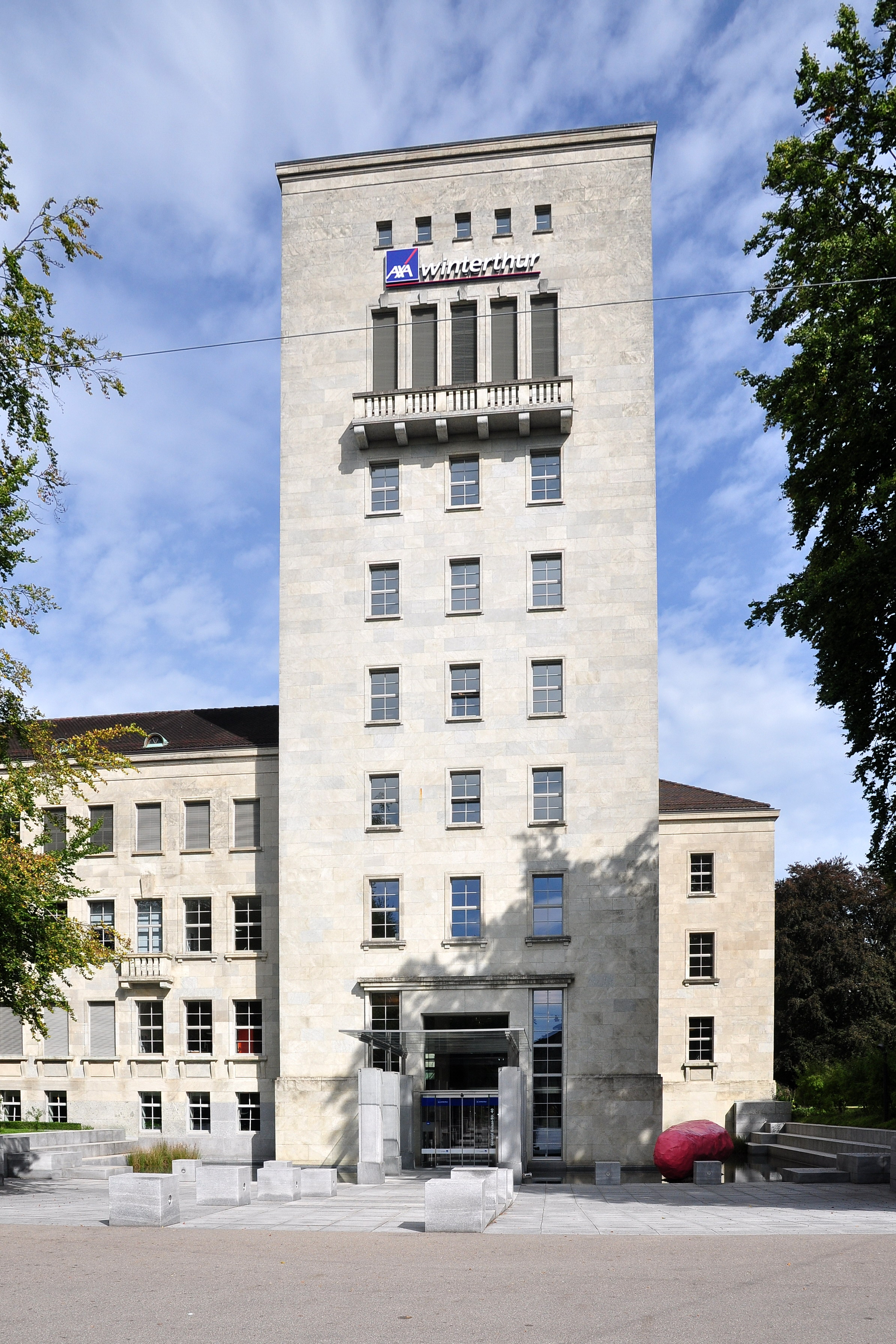
Axa Winterthur building in General Guisan street in Winterthur
