= Ostermundigen =

- Municipality
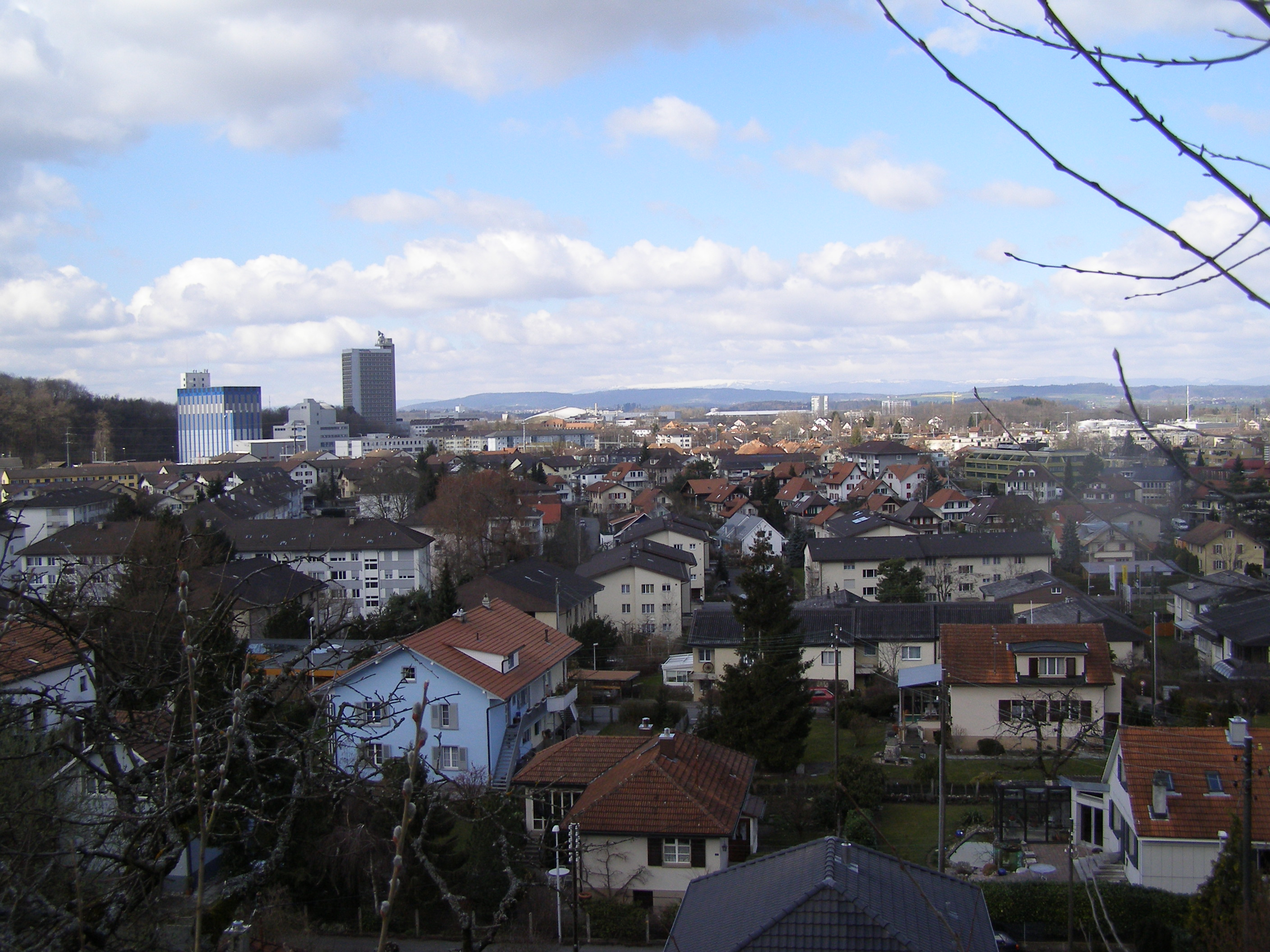

- Flag Coat of arms
- Location of Ostermundigen
- Location within Switzerland Location within Canton of Bern
- Coordinates: 46.95501°N 7.48940°E
- Country: Switzerland
- Canton: Bern
- District: Bern-Mittelland

Government
  - Executive: Gemeinderat with 7 members
  - Mayor: Gemeindepräsident(in); Thomas Iten Ind. (as of 2026)
  - Parliament: Grosser Gemeinderat with 40 members

Area
  - Total: 6.00 km^{2} (2.32 sq mi)
- Elevation (Ober-/Mitteldorfstrasse): 548 m (1,798 ft)

Population (December 2020)
  - Total: 17,758
  - Density: 2,960/km^{2} (7,670/sq mi)
- Time zone: UTC+01:00 (CET)
  - Summer (DST): UTC+02:00 (CEST)
- Postal code: 3072
- SFOS number: 363
- ISO 3166 code: CH-BE
- Surrounded by: Bern, Bolligen, Ittigen, Muri bei Bern, Stettlen
- Website: ostermundigen.ch

Ostermundigen is a municipality in the Bern-Mittelland administrative district in the canton of Bern in Switzerland.

The city is the birthplace of an actress, Ursula Andress.

Most of the buildings in the UNESCO World Heritage Site of the Old City of Bern were built from sandstone quarried in Ostermundigen.

== History ==
Aerial view (1967)

Ostermundigen is first mentioned in 1239 as Osturmundingun. In 1279 it was mentioned as Ostermundigen.

Ostermundigen developed from three medieval villages (the upper, middle and lower villages) which formed a single community. The three villages were surrounded by fourteen fields that were held as fiefs by various nobles. In between the fields, a number of small hamlets developed including; Deisswil, Dennigkofen, Rörswil, Rothus and Wegmühle. Politically and religiously it was part of the municipality of Bolligen, however, the Holzgemeinde (forest cooperative) administered the limited common forest land.

The villages of Ostermundigen formed a quarter of the parish of Bolligen, along with the quarters of Ittigen, Ferenberg and Bolligen. After the Protestant Reformation in 1528 entered the parish, the quarters became partially autonomous. Each quarter was now responsible to care for the poor and orphans and to provide education for the residents of that quarter. Eventually the Holzgemeinde became responsible for providing an education and caring for the poor. They built the first school house in 1746. By the early 19th century, this arrangement had created a complex and unwieldy municipal power structure with five different councils (Holzgemeinde, village, school, quarter and road repair and maintenance) all holding overlapping powers. This was in addition to the municipal and parish councils in Bolligen. In 1856, the citizens of Ostermundigen combined the Holzgemeinde, village council and quarter council into one. The road repair council and the quarter council merged in 1872. In 1945, the school district and the quarter-finally merged which finally gave the Ostermundigen quarter a unified administrative structure. However, the municipal organization was still divided, with a complex division of powers between the municipality and the quarters. Following a long running debate on whether to centralize (1930, 1945, 1963), incorporate in Bern (1913, 1919) or decentralize (1956, 1962, 1972), in 1978 the residents decided to divide the municipality into three independent municipalities; Bolligen, Ittigen and Ostermundigen. From 1980 until 1983, the community completed the process of becoming an independent municipality.

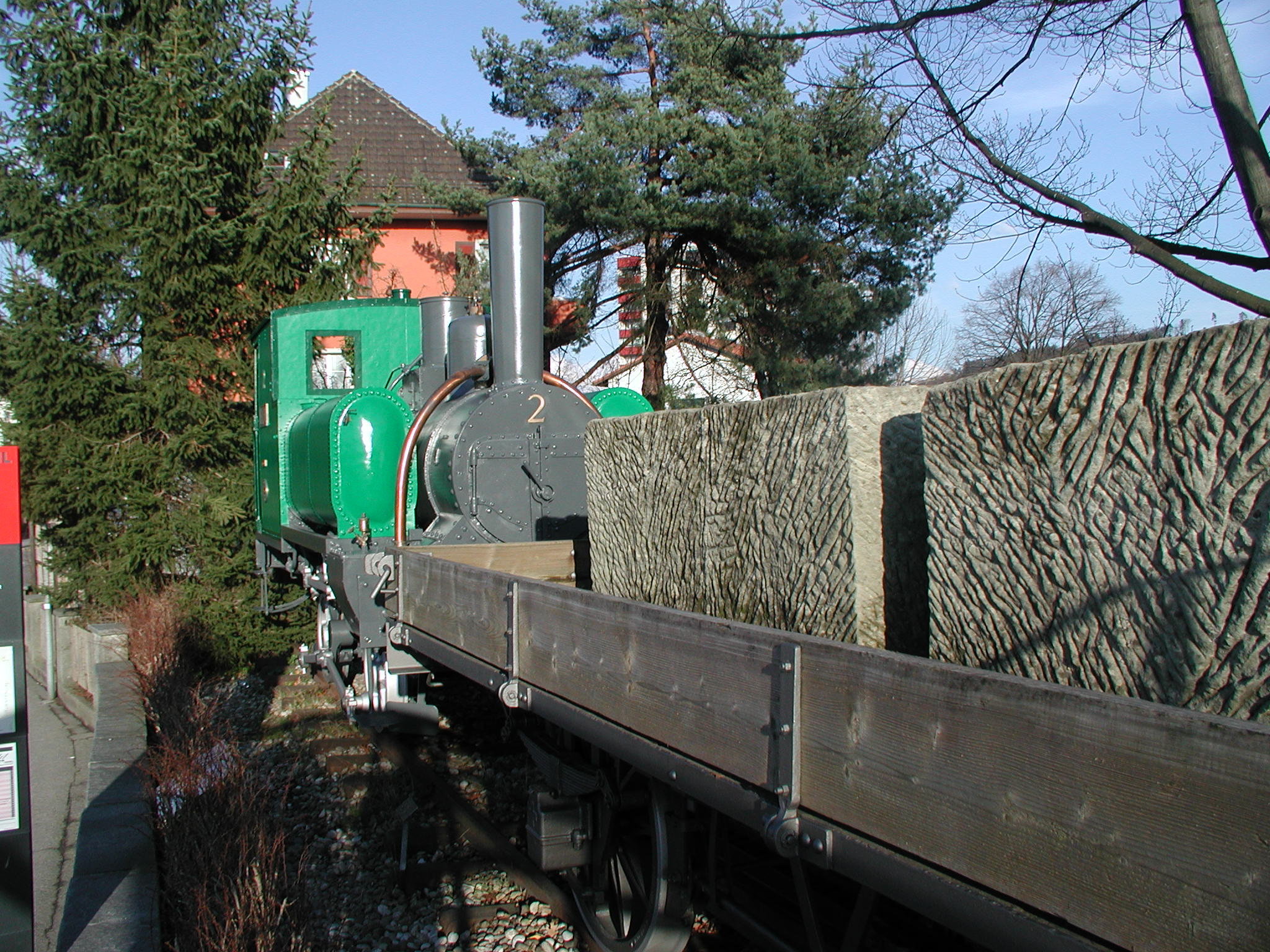
A cog railway steam locomotive with Ostermundigen sandstone at the Zollgasse bus station

The village of Ostermundigen was a stop along the traditional trade route into the Bernese Oberland. By 1500 it had a tavern and a customs house for this trade. Beginning in the 16th century a number of Bernese patricians built country estates in Ostermundigen. Some of the most notable included the Ostermundigengut, built in 1707, the country estate Rothus (basically late Gothic style begun in 1671) and the country estate of Rörswil (built, expanded and renovated from the 16th until the 19th century). By the 15th century Ostermundigen was well known for its sandstone quarries and until 1900, almost every building in Bern was built from Ostermundigen sandstone. In 1859, the Ostermundigen station of the Bern-Thun railroad simplified moving stone from the quarry to customers and led to large scale industrial quarrying and mining. In 1866 they began driving mining shafts under the Ostermundigenberg, with up to 250 miners. In 1871, for a world's first, a rack railway replaced the horse or mule teams that brought the stones from the quarry to the railroad station. Around 1900, the demand for sandstone dwindled as brick and cement replaced stone in new construction. In 1907, the quarry closed and the tunnels were bricked up. Some of the quarries are still in operation though at a much smaller scale.

After 1850, the village quickly changed from small farming villages into an industrial town with many small and medium-sized factories. Some of the largest employers were Zent AG (in operation 1898-1974), the paper and cardboard mill Deisswil (opened in 1876) and the Psychiatric Clinic of Waldau. However, the largest factories were in neighboring municipalities and many residents commuted to jobs in those surrounding communities. At the time, taxes were collected according to the place of work, not the place of residence. Since a large number of residents of Ostermundigen worked outside the community, Ostermundigen struggled from financial crisis to financial crisis. The constant financial strain led to the attempts to centralize, merge with Bern or separate which eventually ended in 1983 with Ostermundigen becoming an independent municipality. However, even today a majority of workers, in 2000 over three-quarters, still commute to jobs in other municipalities.

== Geography ==
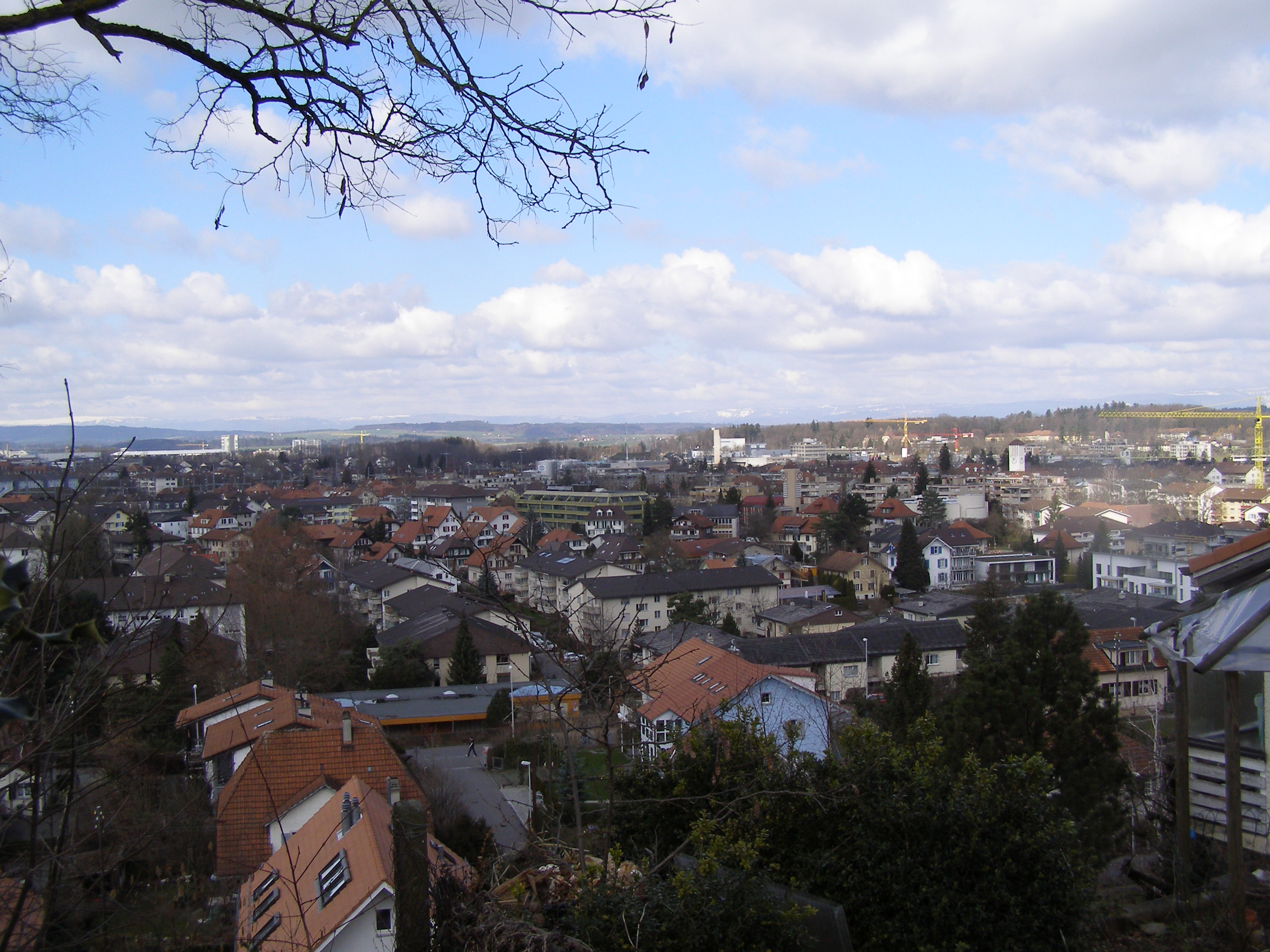
View from Ostermundigenberg over Ostermundigen

Ostermundigen has an area of 5.96 km^{2} (2.30 sq mi). Of this area, 1.9 km^{2} (0.73 mi^{2}) or 32.0% is used for agricultural purposes, while 1.52 km^{2} (0.59 mi^{2}) or 25.6% is forested. Of the rest of the land, 2.55 km^{2} (0.98 mi^{2}) or 42.9% is settled (buildings or roads) and 0.01 km^{2} (2.5 acres) or 0.2% is unproductive land.

Of the built up area, industrial buildings made up 3.2% of the total area while housing and buildings made up 25.8% and transportation infrastructure made up 9.1%. Power and water infrastructure as well as other special developed areas made up 2.0% of the area while parks, green belts and sports fields made up 2.9%. Out of the forested land, 24.4% of the total land area is heavily forested and 1.2% is covered with orchards or small clusters of trees. Of the agricultural land, 25.1% is used for growing crops and 6.2% is pastures.

The municipality is located in the lower Worblental (Worblen valley) at the foot of the Ostermundigenberg and the Hättenberg. It is part of the agglomeration of Bern. Until 1983 it was part of the municipality of Bolligen.

On 31 December 2009 Amtsbezirk Bern, the municipality's former district, was dissolved. On the following day, 1 January 2010, it joined the newly created Verwaltungskreis Bern-Mittelland.

== Coat of arms ==
The blazon of the municipal coat of arms is Gules a Tanner Knife Argent handled Or in bend between two Mullets of the last.

== Demographics ==
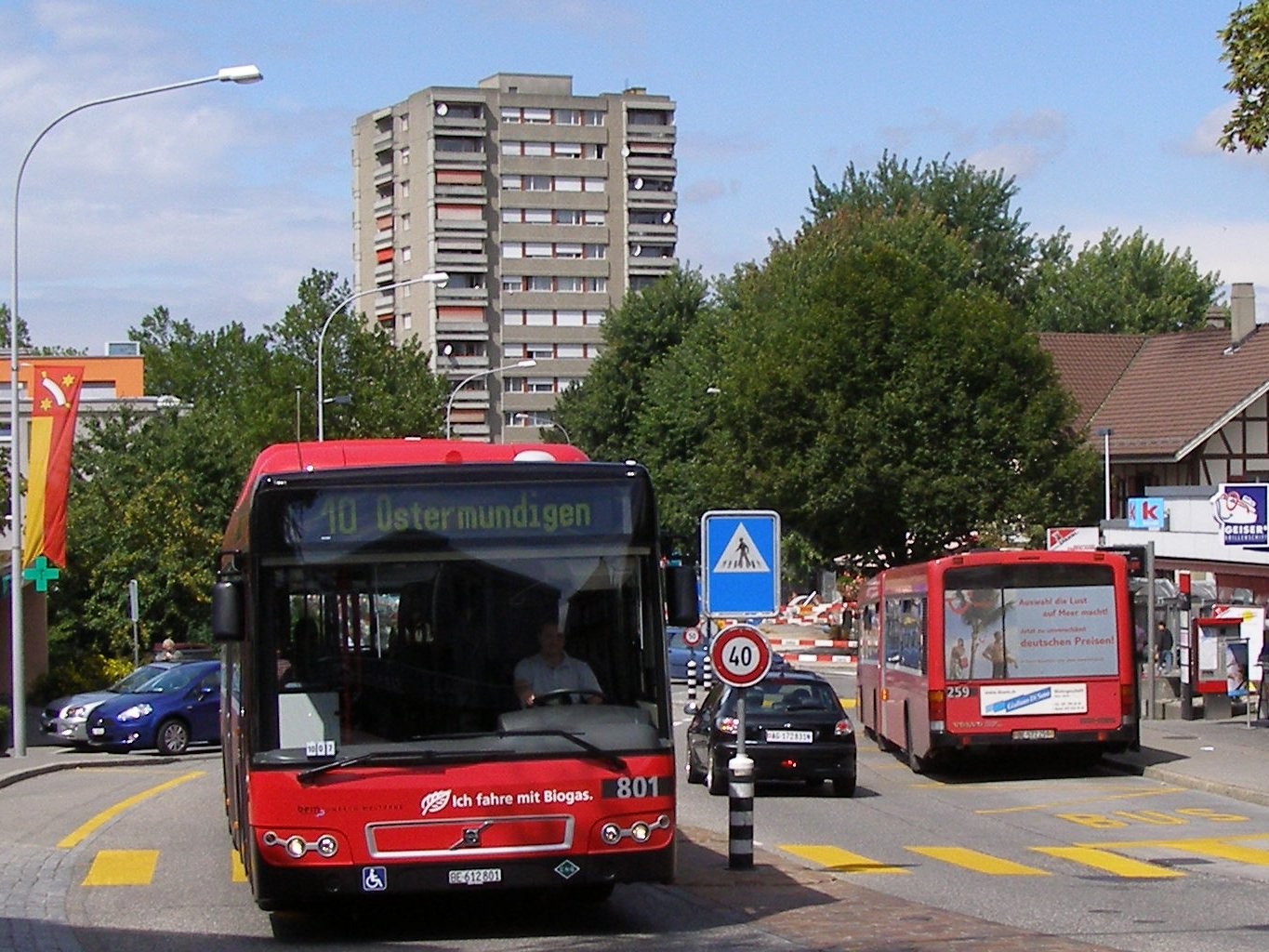
Biogas buses with an apartment tower in Ostermundigen

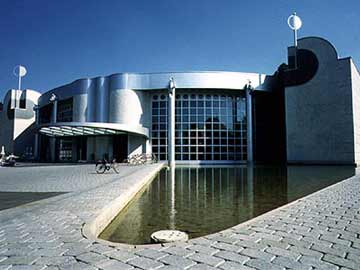
Migros supermarket in Ostermundigen, designed by architect Justus Dahinden

Ostermundigen has a population (as of December 2020) of 17,758. As of 2010, 24.4% of the population are resident foreign nationals. Over the last 10 years (2000–2010) the population has changed at a rate of 1.3%. Migration accounted for 0.3%, while births and deaths accounted for 1.1%.

Most of the population (as of 2000) speaks German (12,677 or 82.0%) as their first language, Italian is the second most common (677 or 4.4%) and French is the third (372 or 2.4%). There are 18 people who speak Romansh.

As of 2008, the population was 48.2% male and 51.8% female. The population was made up of 5,440 Swiss men (35.2% of the population) and 2,007 (13.0%) non-Swiss men. There were 6,238 Swiss women (40.4%) and 1,753 (11.4%) non-Swiss women. Of the population in the municipality, 3,234 or about 20.9% were born in Ostermundigen and lived there in 2000. There were 5,881 or 38.1% who were born in the same canton, while 2,400 or 15.5% were born somewhere else in Switzerland, and 3,237 or 20.9% were born outside of Switzerland.

As of 2010, children and teenagers (0–19 years old) make up 18.1% of the population, while adults (20–64 years old) make up 62.1% and seniors (over 64 years old) make up 19.8%.

As of 2000, there were 6,037 people who were single and never married in the municipality. There were 7,480 married individuals, 900 widows or widowers and 1,035 individuals who are divorced.

As of 2000, there were 2,918 households that consist of only one person and 255 households with five or more people. In 2000, a total of 7,176 apartments (93.1% of the total) were permanently occupied, while 396 apartments (5.1%) were seasonally occupied and 133 apartments (1.7%) were empty. As of 2010, the construction rate of new housing units was 2.9 new units per 1000 residents. The vacancy rate for the municipality, in 2011, was 0.73%.

The historical population is given in the following chart:

== Politics ==
In the 2011 federal election the most popular party was the SPS which received 24.9% of the vote. The next three most popular parties were the BDP Party (17.9%), the SVP (17%) and the FDP (8.7%). In the federal election, a total of 4,137 votes were cast, and the voter turnout was 41.1%.

== Economy ==
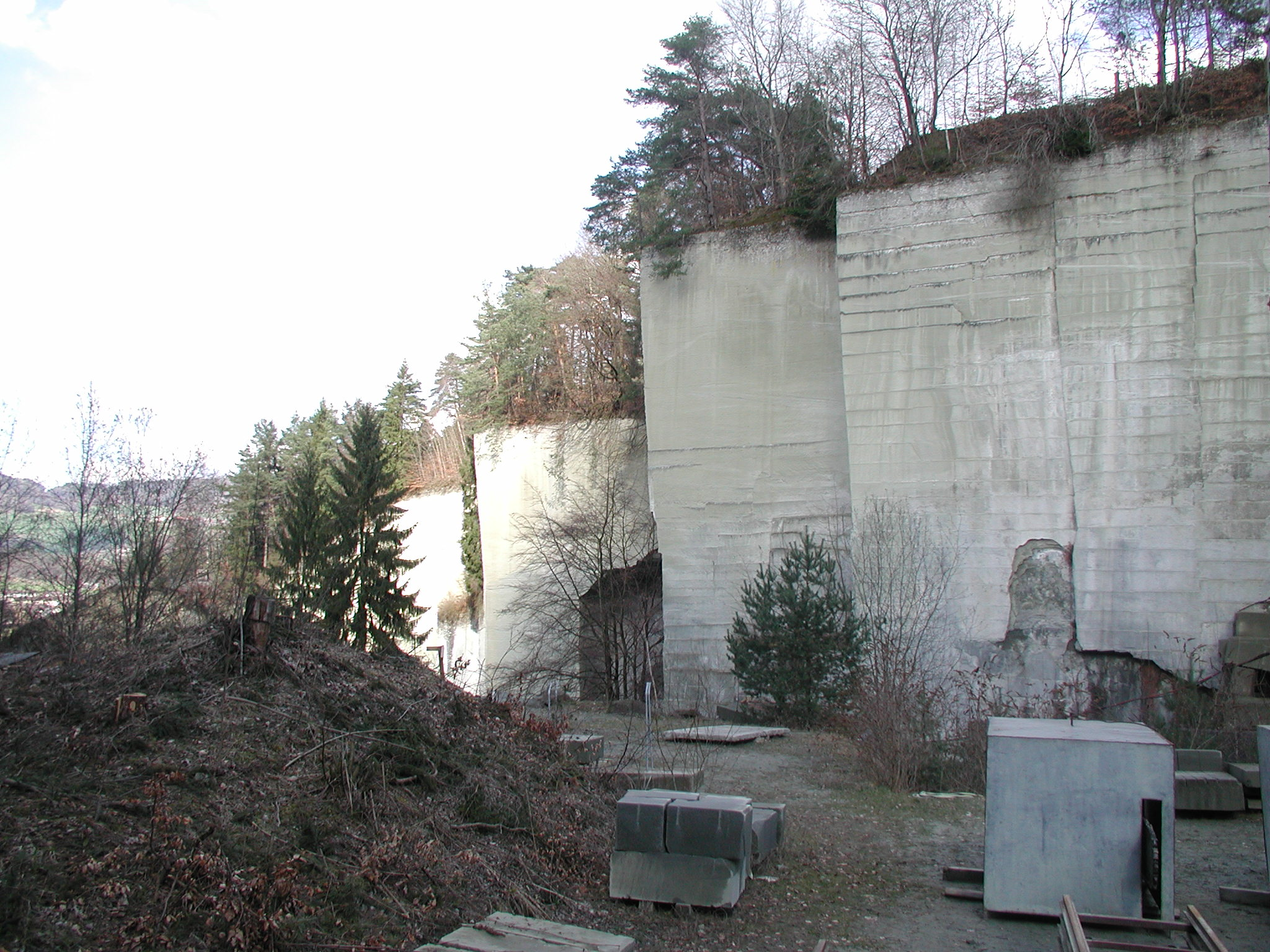
Sandstone quarry in Ostermundigen

As of 2011, Ostermundigen had an unemployment rate of 3.05%. As of 2008, there were a total of 6,368 people employed in the municipality. Of these, there were 25 people employed in the primary economic sector and about 9 businesses involved in this sector. 1,930 people were employed in the secondary sector and there were 103 businesses in this sector. 4,413 people were employed in the tertiary sector, with 378 businesses in this sector.

In 2008 there were a total of 5,593 full-time equivalent jobs. The number of jobs in the primary sector was 13, all of which were in agriculture. The number of jobs in the secondary sector was 1,824 of which 1,001 or (54.9%) were in manufacturing and 503 (27.6%) were in construction. The number of jobs in the tertiary sector was 3,756. In the tertiary sector; 853 or 22.7% were in wholesale or retail sales or the repair of motor vehicles, 374 or 10.0% were in the movement and storage of goods, 163 or 4.3% were in a hotel or restaurant, 1,204 or 32.1% were in the information industry, 215 or 5.7% were the insurance or financial industry, 193 or 5.1% were technical professionals or scientists, 156 or 4.2% were in education and 259 or 6.9% were in health care.

In 2000, there were 4,510 workers who commuted into the municipality and 6,689 workers who commuted away. The municipality is a net exporter of workers, with about 1.5 workers leaving the municipality for every one entering. Of the working population, 46% used public transportation to get to work, and 31.7% used a private car.

== Religion ==
From the 2000 census, 3,578 or 23.2% were Roman Catholic, while 7,995 or 51.7% belonged to the Swiss Reformed Church. Of the rest of the population, there were 248 members of an Orthodox church (or about 1.60% of the population), there were 14 individuals (or about 0.09% of the population) who belonged to the Christian Catholic Church, and there were 997 individuals (or about 6.45% of the population) who belonged to another Christian church. There were 10 individuals (or about 0.06% of the population) who were Jewish, and 944 (or about 6.11% of the population) who were Islamic. There were 79 individuals who were Buddhist, 228 individuals who were Hindu and 21 individuals who belonged to another church. 1,258 (or about 8.14% of the population) belonged to no church, are agnostic or atheist, and 569 individuals (or about 3.68% of the population) did not answer the question.

== Education ==
In Ostermundigen about 6,604 or (42.7%) of the population have completed non-mandatory upper secondary education, and 1,623 or (10.5%) have completed additional higher education (either university or a Fachhochschule). Of the 1,623 who completed tertiary schooling, 64.5% were Swiss men, 21.2% were Swiss women, 9.4% were non-Swiss men and 4.9% were non-Swiss women.

The Canton of Bern school system provides one year of non-obligatory Kindergarten, followed by six years of Primary school. This is followed by three years of obligatory lower Secondary school where the students are separated according to ability and aptitude. Following the lower Secondary students may attend additional schooling or they may enter an apprenticeship.

During the 2009–10 school year, there were a total of 1,365 students attending classes in Ostermundigen. There were 13 kindergarten classes with a total of 241 students in the municipality. Of the kindergarten students, 37.3% were permanent or temporary residents of Switzerland (not citizens) and 55.6% have a different mother language than the classroom language. The municipality had 36 primary classes and 678 students. Of the primary students, 36.9% were permanent or temporary residents of Switzerland (not citizens) and 60.2% have a different mother language than the classroom language. During the same year, there were 21 lower secondary classes with a total of 385 students. There were 28.8% who were permanent or temporary residents of Switzerland (not citizens) and 53.5% have a different mother language than the classroom language.

As of 2000, there were 82 students in Ostermundigen who came from another municipality, while 460 residents attended schools outside the municipality.

== Notable people ==
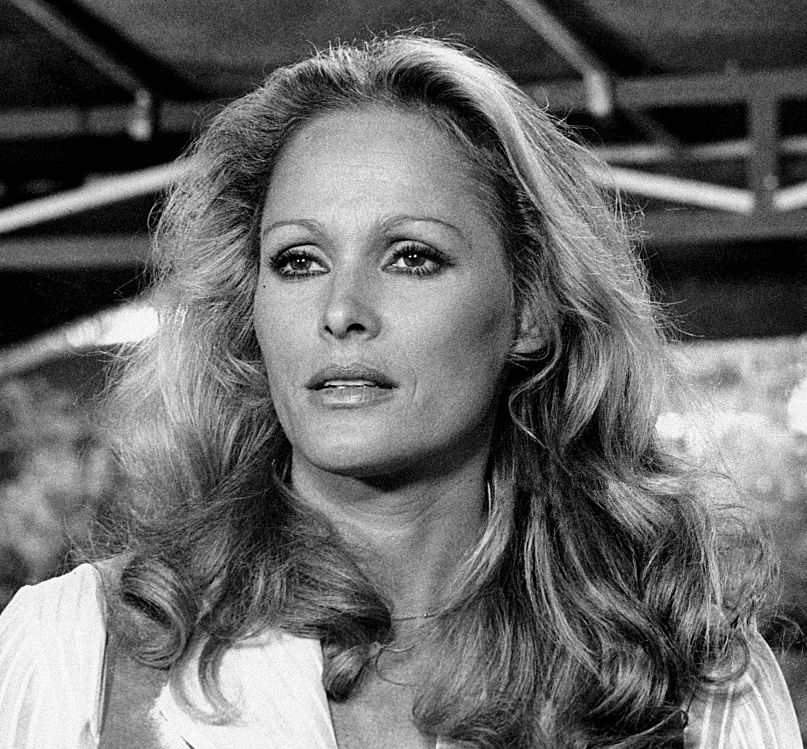
Ursula Andress, 1974

- Hans Fahrni (1874 in Prague – 1939 in Ostermundigen) was a Swiss chess master
- Ursula Andress (born 1936 in Ostermundigen) a Swiss film and television actress
- Michelle Hunziker (born 1977) a Swiss-Dutch naturalized Italian TV hostess, actress, model and singer; brought up in Ostermundigen
- Michel Kratochvil (born 1979 in Ostermundigen) a former tennis player
