= Homburger =

Homburger is a surname. Notable people with the surname include:

- August Homburger (1873–1930), German child psychiatrist
- Birgit Homburger (born 1965), German politician
- Freddy Homburger (1916–2001), Swiss-born oncologist
- Henry Homburger (1902–1950), American bobsledder and civil engineer
- Paul Homburger (1882–1965), German-born lawyer, banker, and art collector

== See also ==
- Erik Erikson (1902–1994), once named Erik Homburger, American child psychoanalyst
- Bankhaus Veit L. Homburger, bank in Karlsruhe, Germany
- Homburg (hat)
- Hamburger (disambiguation)
