= Adolf Brunner =

Adolf Brunner may refer to:

- Adolf Brunner (composer) (1901–1992), Swiss composer
- Adolf Brunner (politician) (1900–1963), List of mayors of Herisau
- Adolf Brunner, also Adolph Brunner (1837–1909), Swiss architect, architect of orangery in the Rieterpark
