= Gigon/Guyer =

Architectural office is Zurich, Switzerland

Annette Gigon / Mike Guyer Architects is an architectural office based in Zurich, Switzerland. It is led by the Swiss-born architect Annette Gigon and the U.S.-born architect Mike Guyer. Works by the office have been widely published and are admired for their formal logic and legibility, their sensitive handling of materials, and their skillful use of color.

== Education and academic careers ==
Annette Gigon was born on May 24, 1959, in Herisau, Switzerland. She graduated in architecture in 1984 from ETH Zurich. She worked in the offices of Marbach and Rüegg 1984–1986 and Herzog & de Meuron 1986–1988, and also in her own practice from 1987.

Mike Guyer was born on July 5, 1958, in Columbus, Ohio. He attended primary and high school in Zurich, and graduated in architecture in 1984 from ETH Zurich. He worked at Office for Metropolitan Architecture in Rotterdam 1984–1987. He established his own office in 1987, and was an assistant lecturer under Prof. Hans Kollhoff at ETH Zurich 1987–1988.

Gigon and Guyer were visiting professors at EPF Lausanne 2001–2002, and visiting professors at ETH Zurich from 2008. Since 2012, they hold a joint Professorship for Architecture And Construction at ETH Zurich. Both are members of the Federation of Swiss Architects (BSA), and Annette Gigon is a member of the Academy of Arts, Berlin.

== Practice ==
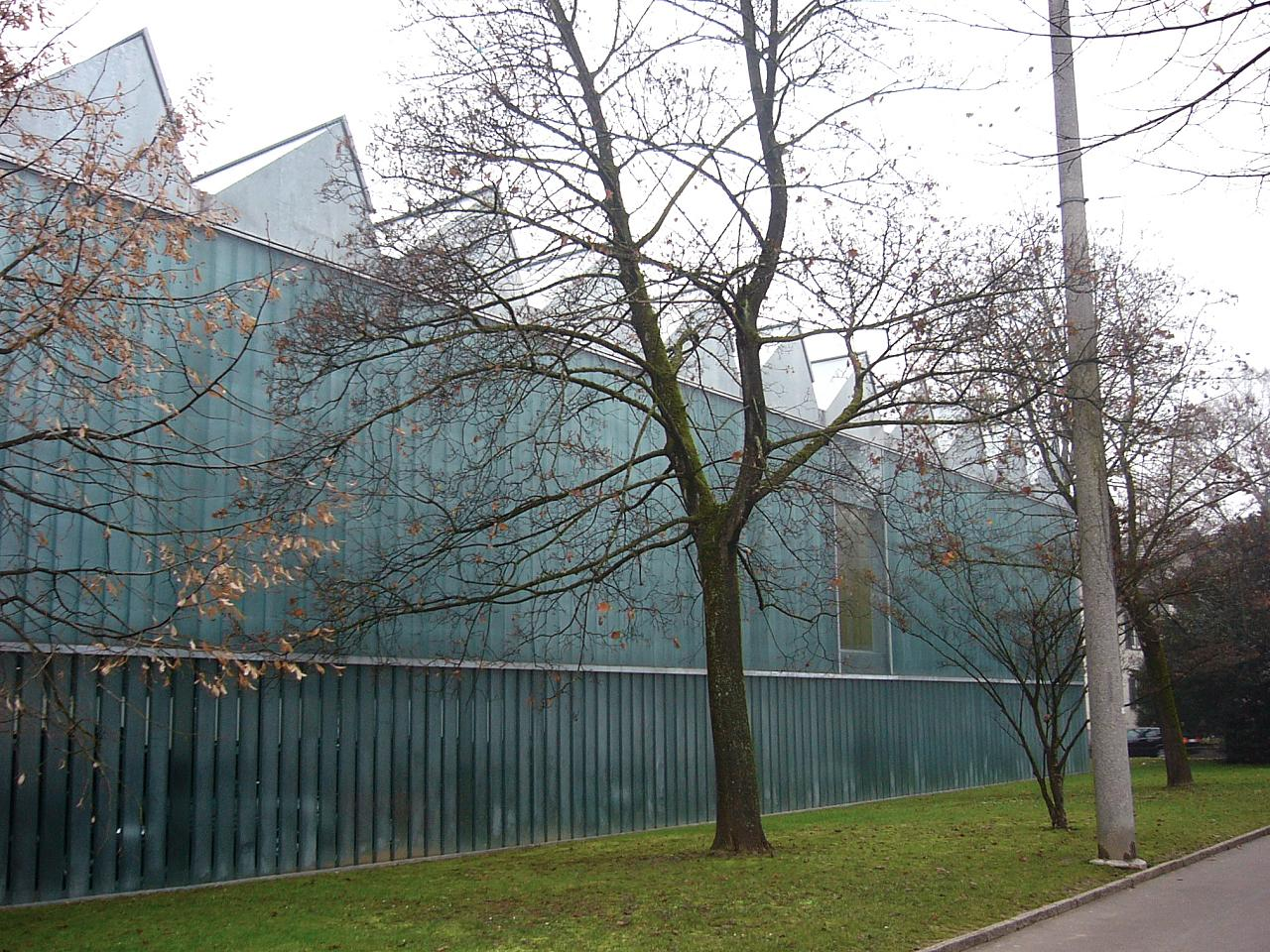
Extension of Kunstmuseum Winterthur

Gigon and Guyer established Annette Gigon / Mike Guyer Architects in 1989. As of 2011, the practice consisted of the two founding partners, an office manager, seven team leaders, and about 50 co-workers. It wins the majority of its commissions by taking 1st Prize in open or invited competitions.

Gigon/Guyer established its reputation in the 1990s through its work on houses and museums, notably the Kirchner Museum in Davos, devoted to the art of Ernst Ludwig Kirchner, and Museum Liner in Appenzell. In 1998 it won 1st Prize in a competition for the design of the archaeological Museum and Park Kalkreise in Osnabrück, Germany, near the site of the ancient Battle of the Teutoburg Forest. It is noticeable that the firm soonly attracted international attention after its museum designs, such as the already mentioned Kirchner Museum in Davos, the Museum Extension in Winterthur, Kunstmuseum Appenzell, or the Archaeological Museum and Park in Kalkriese near Osnabrück, Germany. The other museum (the Swiss Museum of Transport in Lucerne) has later expanded the list.

Since 2000, the practice has expanded its range to include residential development projects (many of which have won the "Good Architecture" awards of the municipalities in which they are located) and office buildings.

Recently, Gigon/Guyer have completed several important projects in Zürich West, a former industrial district. They include Prime Tower, Switzerland’s tallest building from 2011 to 2015, and a new office complex on Lagerstrasse, a collaborative project with Max Dudler and David Chipperfield. In the same district, they have designed a residential tower, office building, and two contemporary art museums as additions to Löwenbräu Areal, a former brewery and listed industrial landmark.

== Characteristics ==
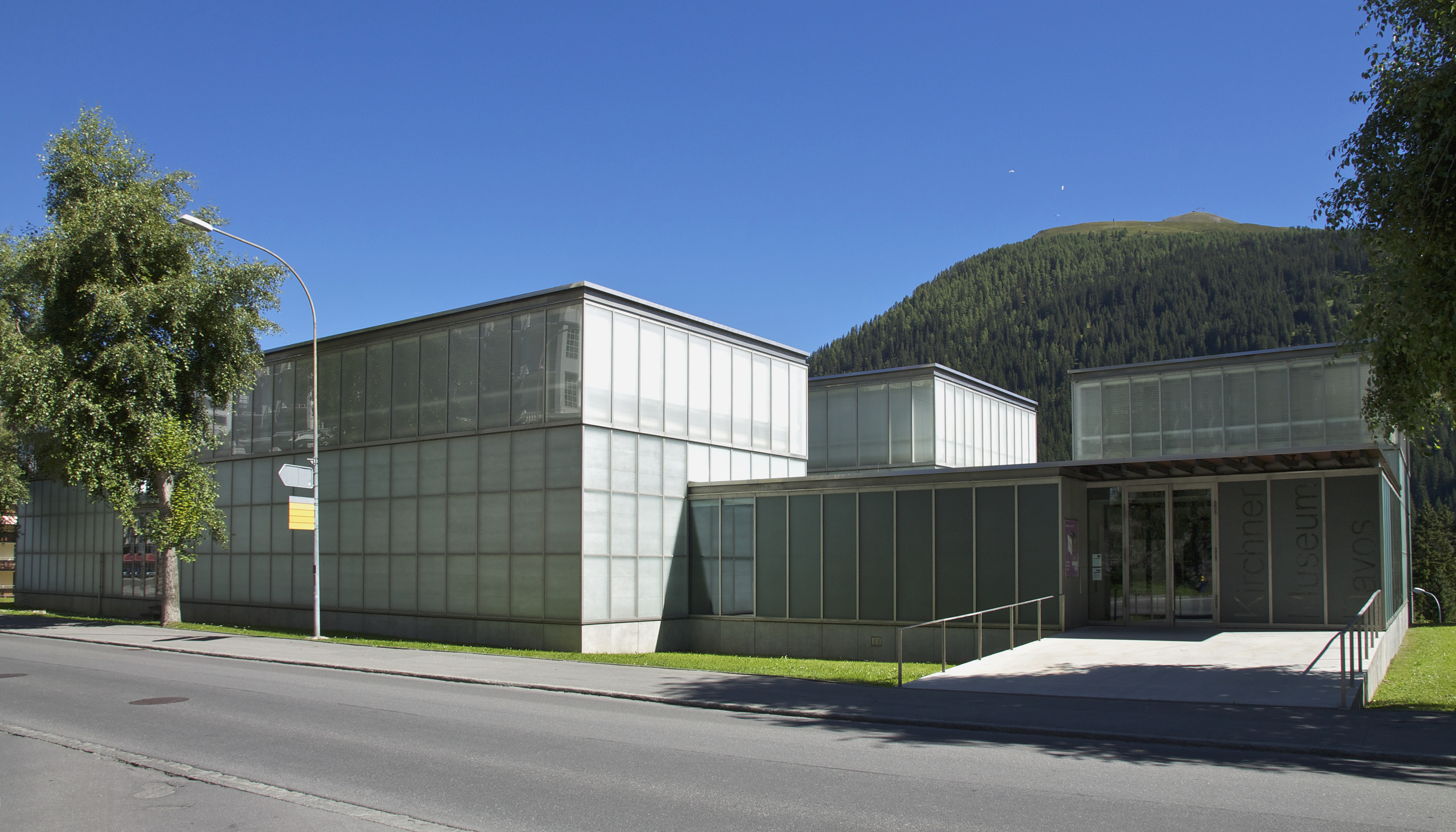
Kirchner Museum

According to Fiona McLachlan, a practicing architect who teaches at the University of Edinburgh, the buildings of Gigon/Guyer are "spatially clear, legible, and logical", with a "simplicity of form derived predominantly from function." The museum projects typically employ a subdued, material-based palette, with a series of simple, white-painted spaces in the interior and exteriors that "avoid being bland, characterless containers by their poetic use of materials." But many of their other projects utilize strong colors inside and outside, often chosen together with artist Harald Müller, a frequent collaborator.

== Selected projects ==
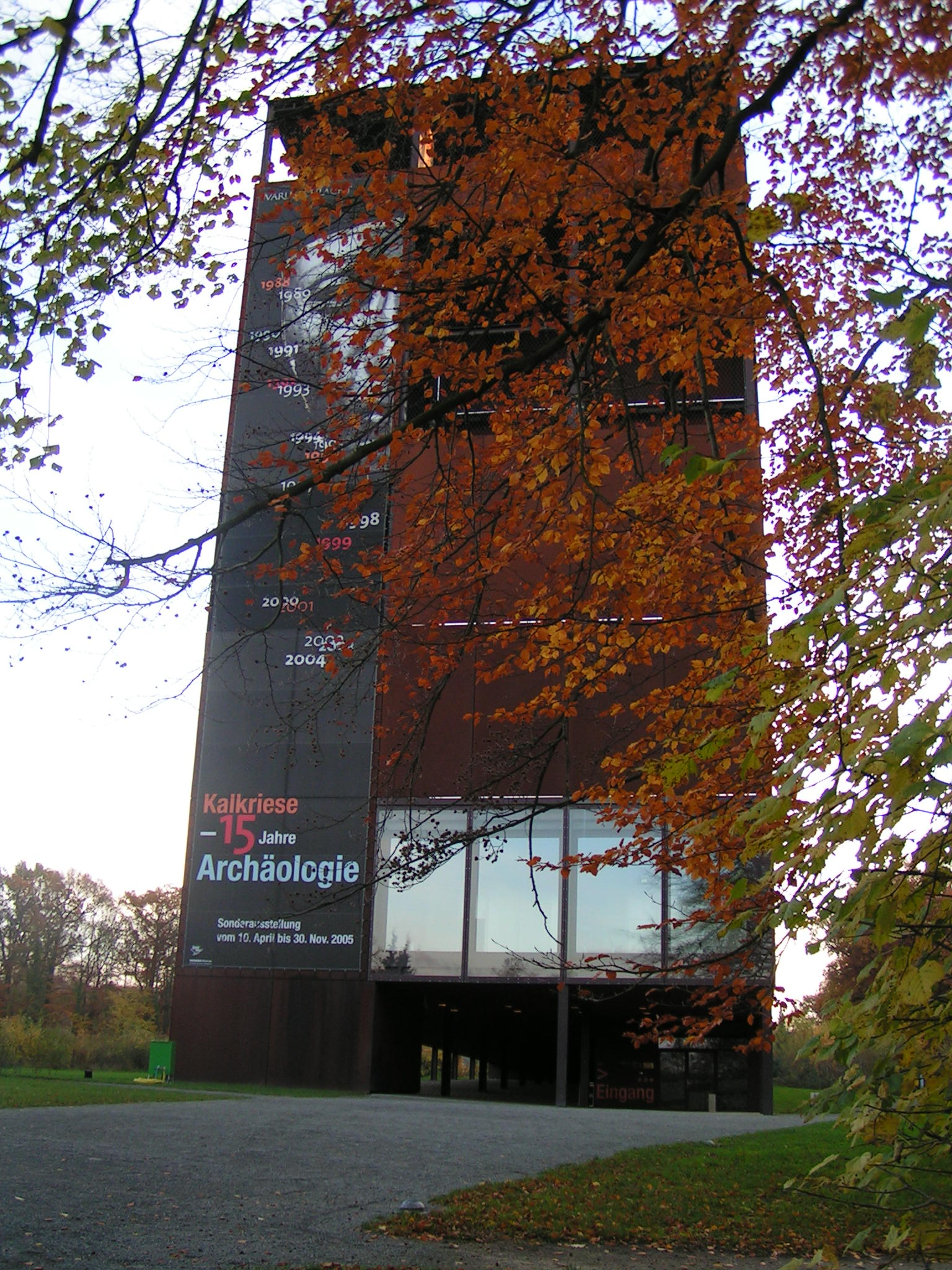
Tower of Museum and Park Kalkriese

- 1989–1992 Kirchner Museum Davos
- 1993–1995 Extension Kunstmuseum Winterthur
- 1992–1996 Davos Sports Center
- 1994–1996 Housing Development Broëlberg I, Kirchberg
- 1995–1998 Two Houses, Zurich
- 1996–1998 Museum Liner, Appenzell
- 1997–1999 Signal Box, Zurich
- 1998–2000 Three Houses on Susenbergstrasse, Zurich
- 1999–2002 Archaeological Museum und Park Kalkriese, Osnabrück, Germany
- 2001–2003 Espace de l'art concret, Mouans-Sartoux, France
- 2002–2004 Art Gallery Henze & Ketterer, Wichtrach
- 2006–2007 Detached House, Canton Grisons
- 2003–2009 Housing development projects in Zurich, Wädenswil, Dietikon, Schlieren
- 2005–2009 Swiss Museum of Transport, Entrance Building, Lucerne
- 2004–2011 Prime Tower Office High-rise, Zurich
- 2006–2012 Kunsthalle Zürich and Migros Museum für Gegenwartskunst, in Löwenbräu Art Complex, Zurich
- 2007–2013 Office Building Lagerstrasse House, Zurich
- 2009–2013 Würth Haus, Rorschach

== Awards ==
- 1994: Auszeichnungen für gute Bauten Graubünden
- 2001: Auszeichnungen für gute Bauten Graubünden

== Publications ==
- Gigon, Annette; Guyer, Mike (2012). Gigon/Guyer Architects: Works and Projects 2001-2011. Zurich: Lars Muller. ISBN 978-3037782767.
