= Marti Group =

Swiss construction services company

- Industry: Construction: Real Estate, Tunnels, Civil Engineering
- Founded: 1922
- Headquarters: Moosseedorf, Switzerland
- Key people: Reto Marti (Chairman)
- Website: www.marti.com

The Marti Group is a Swiss construction company, consisting of over 80 subsidiaries, officially owned by Marti Holding AG. Besides Switzerland, they are active in neighboring countries such as Germany and Austria, and also outside of Europe such as China and Chile. The company is known for high-profile public and private sector projects and using innovative technologies. Their areas of expertise include building construction, construction and renovation of tunnels, road construction, hydraulic engineering, and other types of civil engineering. They are estimated to be the second largest construction company in Switzerland by revenue and number of employees, only surpassed by Implenia. Marti has a significant presence in infrastructure and publicly owned building projects, many of which are awarded through public procurement procedures. The company is involved in numerous large-scale projects across Switzerland, including works at Bern railway station.

This strong involvement in public works is supported by several structural factors. Marti maintains a degree of vertical integration through subsidiaries such as Marti Technik, which is active in construction and extraction machinery, as well as through the ownership of gravel quarries supplying raw materials.

The company operates under a holding structure that facilitates coordination between its national and international subsidiaries, enabling resource sharing and operational alignment across projects.

Marti's extensive portfolio of completed public infrastructure projects contributes to its established position in the Swiss construction sector. In addition, the company is involved in vocational training initiatives, including the Marti Future program, which promotes apprenticeship opportunities within the organization.

The company's headquarters are located in Moosseedorf and serve as both an administrative center and a logistics platform.

Marti Holding AG is organized under a holding structure and oversees a network of more than 80 subsidiaries operating both in Switzerland and internationally. The Board of Directors consists of Reto M. Marti (Co-Owner and President), Rudolf A. Marti (Co-Owner and former president), Rolf Blatter (vice-president), Paul Bühler (CEO), Adrian Markus Kamm, Benoit Demierre, Adrian Karl Müller, Daniel Schorro (CFO), and Dietmar Kerbis (managing director), with each member holding individual signatory authority. The group includes several international subsidiaries such as Simate GmbH and Renesco GmbH in Germany, Marti Deutschland GmbH, Marti Technik Deutschland AG, Marti EPC Ltd. in China, Marti Technics Ltd. in Hong Kong, Marti IVA Holding in Iceland, Bra-Vur A.S. and Marti A.S. in Slovakia, Marti AS in Norway, Marti Chile SA, and Marti USA, Inc. In Switzerland, key subsidiaries include Marti Bern AG, Marti Solothurn AG, Marti Construction SA, Marti Basel AG, Marti Arc Jura SA, Marti Tunnel AG, Marti Zurich AG, Marti Technik AG, and Marti Infra AG, reflecting the group's broad operational presence and coordination across regions.

== Major projects ==
Tunnel construction:

- Expansion of the Gubrist Tunnel by building a third tunnel
- Expansion of the Petersberg railway tunnel in Germany, such that the tunnel was in service during construction
- Building an access tunnel to the Gotthard Road Tunnel
- Section of the Brenner Base Tunnel, one of the longest railway tunnels in the world
- Excavation of the Eppenberg Tunnel to double the capacity of the Olten-Aarau line
- Underground works on CERN's Hilumi project

Skyscraper construction:

- Prime Tower in Zürich, the tallest building in Switzerland from 2011
- Roche Tower 2 in Basel, the current tallest building in Switzerland

Marti was one of the contractors involved in the Astra Bridge, which is a bridge that can be installed over a motorway, such that roadworks can be carried out under the bridge while there is uninterrupted two lane traffic right above them. This type of construction was the first of its kind. The bridge has a modular design, its parts can be carried by regular trucks and it can be installed in a matter of days.

== Controversies ==
In 2020, Marti was accused that their handling of construction waste resulted in fish deaths in the Blausee since 2018. Marti denied the accusation, saying that what they did was allowed by the authorities and it was not the cause of the fish deaths. As of 2024 the case is pending in Swiss federal court.
