= Maag-Zahnräder =

Swiss gear manufacturer

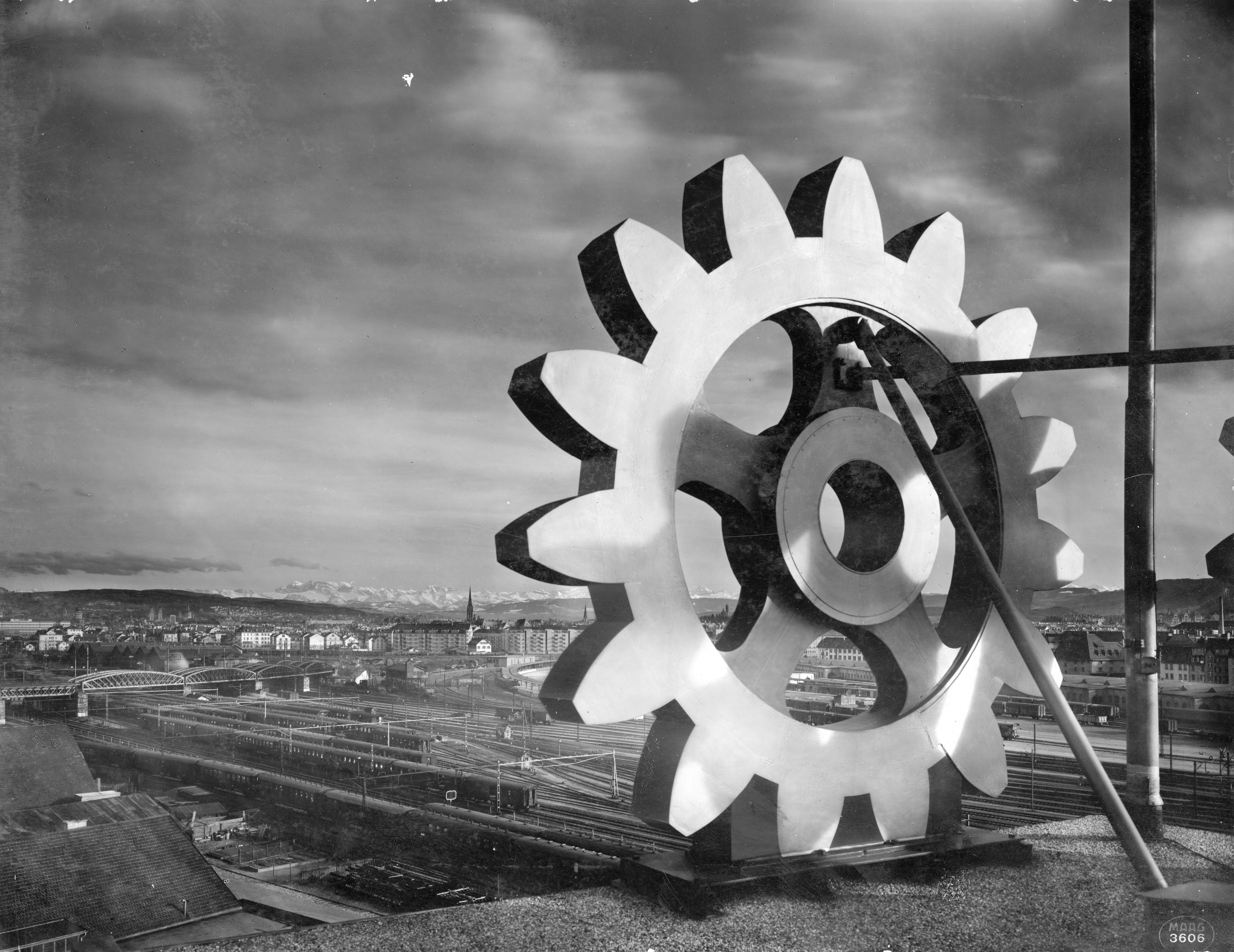
- Logo on the roof of Maag Zahnräder, around 1940

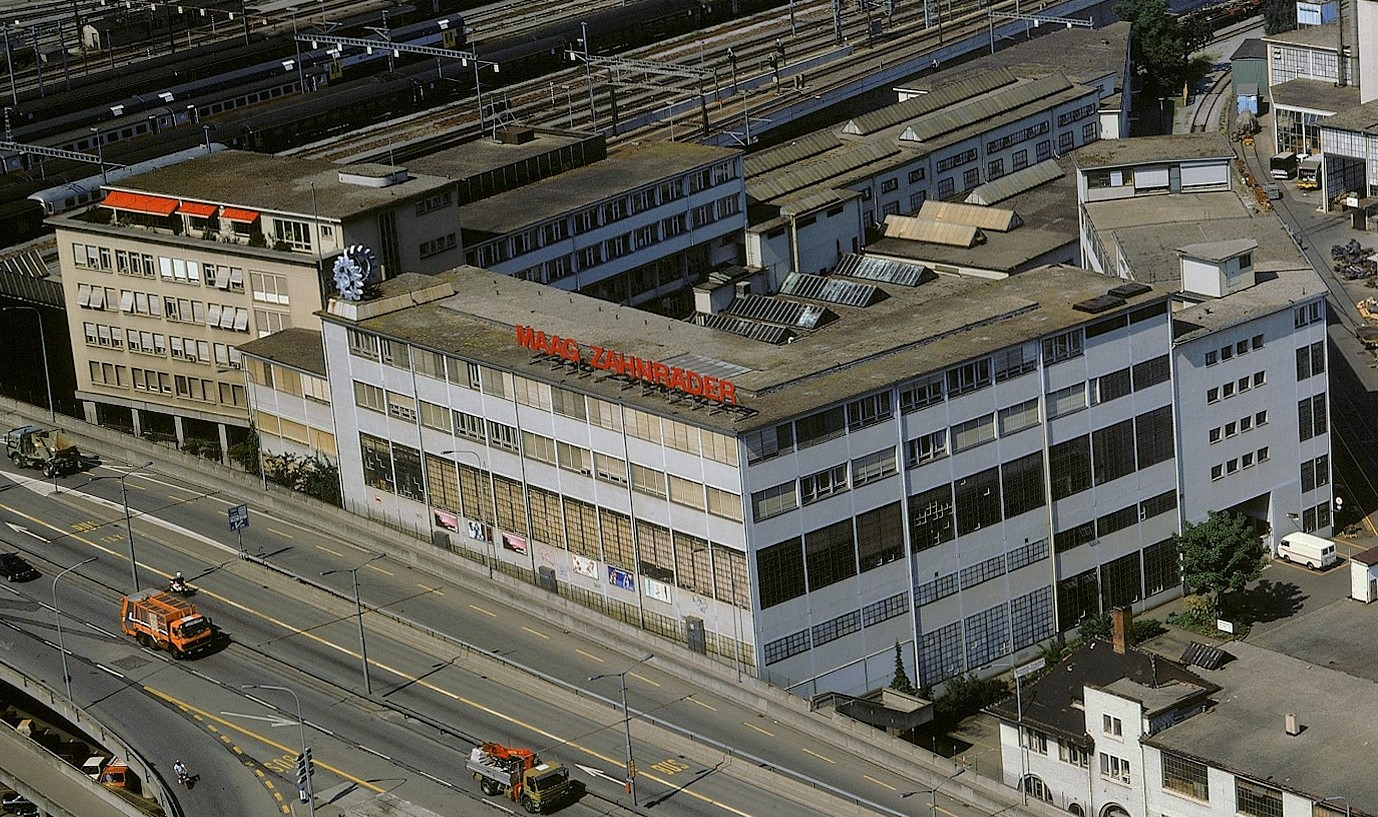
- Maag Zahnräder 1991
- Company type: Joint-stock company
- Industry: Mechanical engineering
- Founded: 1913 in Zürich, Switzerland
- Founder: Max Maag
- Fate: Converted into a real estate company, later acquired by Swiss Prime Site
- Headquarters: Zürich, Switzerland
- Products: Gears, gear drives, gear pumps, gear-cutting and gear-measuring machines
- Number of employees: 2,500 (1980)

Maag-Zahnräder was a Swiss gear manufacturer based in Zürich. Founded in 1913 by the engineer Max Maag, it grew into a company with a worldwide market presence before its production businesses were sold off in the 1990s and it was converted into a real estate company.

== History ==
The engineer Max Maag began studying gears in 1908. He opened an engineering office in Horgen in 1910, founded the firm Maag-Zahnräder in Zürich in 1913 and Maag-Maschinen in Winterthur in 1916, having taken part in 1915 in the founding of the Zahnradfabrik Friedrichshafen. In 1920 Maag's poorly performing companies were brought together in the holding company Maag-Zahnräder und -Maschinen AG under the direction of Gebrüder Sulzer and the Swiss Bank Corporation, and were reorganized during the economic crisis of 1921–22. Between 1920 and 1927 the number of employees fell from 712 to 200.

In 1927 Georg A. Fischer and Albert E. Bruppacher acquired the majority of the shares. While Maag left the company, Fischer, as operating manager, built up a worldwide market presence. The product range comprised, besides gears, gear drives, gear pumps, and gear-cutting and gear-measuring machines. In 1980 the company employed 2,500 people, 1,350 of them in Switzerland, and achieved a turnover of over 200 million francs.

In the 1980s a major reduction in staff followed; at the same time the company diversified through the acquisitions of Krebsöge (powder metallurgy, 1986) and Schmid (fine blanking, 1987). By the end of 1997 the manufacturing companies had been sold off one after another, followed by conversion into a real estate company, which was taken over in 2004 by the real estate group Swiss Prime Site. From the late 1990s the Maag site, like other parts of the former industrial district of Zürich-West, developed into an urban space for living, working, and leisure.

== Bibliography ==
- R. Jaun, Management und Arbeiterschaft, 1986
- 75 Jahre Maag Holding, [1995]

=== Archives ===
- Schweizerisches Wirtschaftsarchiv (SWA)
