= Annette Gigon =

Swiss architect (born 1959)

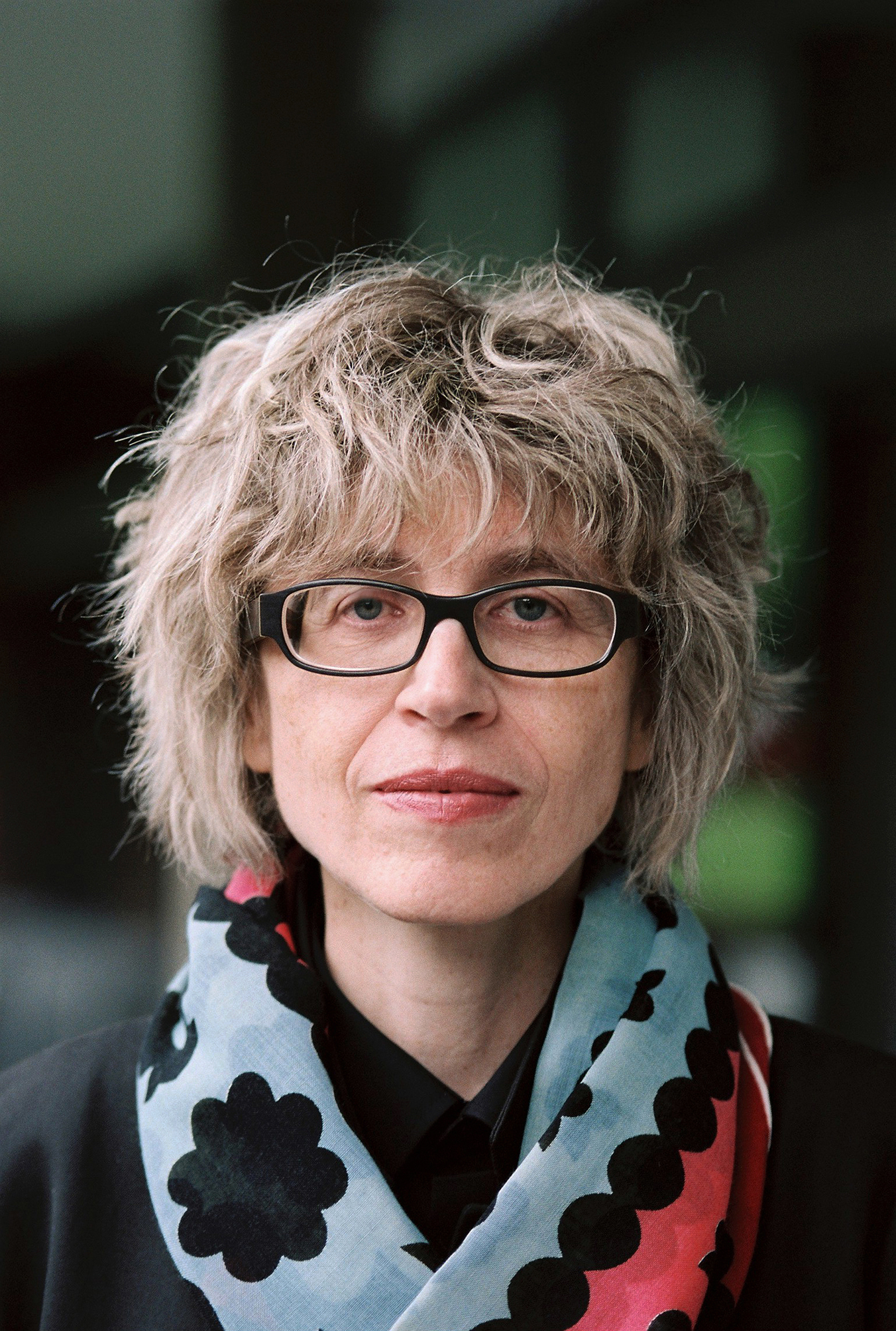
- Gigon photographed in 2008
- Born: May 24, 1959 (age 67)
- Education: ETH Zurich
- Occupation: Architect
- Practice: Gigon/Guyer Architects
- Buildings: Kirchner Museum; Winterthur Museum Extension, Kunstmuseum Appenzell, Archaeological Museum and Park

Annette Gigon (born May 24, 1959) is a Swiss architect born in Herisau, Switzerland. She is a founding partner of the office Gigon/Guyer and held a Chair of Architecture at ETH Zurich.

== Life ==
Annette Gigon graduated from the Swiss Federal Institute of Technology (ETH) in Zurich in 1984. After graduating, she worked for Marbach & Rüegg architects in Zurich from 1984 to 1985. Then, from 1985 to 1988, she worked for Herzog & de Meuron architects in Basel. She also worked as an independent architect from 1987 to 1989.

In 1989, she founded Gigon/Guyer Architects with Mike Guyer, based in Zurich. Their firm soon became internationally known by their museum designs (Kirchner Museum in Davos,the Museum Extension in Winterthur, Kunstmuseum Appenzell, and the Archaeological Museum and Park in Kalkriese near Osnabrück, Germany). Moreover, they have shared their time between more museum projects (the Swiss Museum of Transport in Lucerne, for instance) and developing new solutions for both exclusive and cost-effective residential architecture and office buildings. Between their noticeable examples are the office high-rise Prime Tower in Zurich, the Würth Haus Rorschach, and the remodeling of the Löwenbräu-Areal.

Gigon worked as a visiting professor at EPFL Lausanne in 2002. In 2003, she became a member of the Academy of Arts, Berlin. She started as a guest professor at ETH Zurich in 2008 and has been a professor since 2012. She is married and currently lives in Zurich.

== Notable projects and awards ==
Gigon and Guyer are most widely known for their museum designs, but also construct many office, public, and residential buildings.

=== Kirchner Museum ===
This museum building was planned and executed from January 1990 to August 1992 in Davos, Switzerland. It was created to house the art of German expressionist painter Ernst Ludwig Kirchner, and was the first major commission of Gigon and Guyer. The museum earned them the “Auszeichnung guter Bauten” awarded by the Canton of Grisons, Bauen in den Bergen Prize awarded by Sexten Kultur, and the Daylight-Award awarded by the Velux-Stiftung.

=== Kunstmuseum Winterthur Extension ===
This extension was planned and executed from 1993 to 1995 and was built to create additional space onto the existing museum for the next decades. It also contains a car park. This museum extension made Gigon and Guyer finalists for the Mies van der Rohe Award for European Architecture, awarded by the European Union.

=== Museum Liner ===
Located in Appenzell, Switzerland, this museum was built to honor the paintings of two locals, Father Carl Augusta and Carl Walter Liner. It was planned and constructed from 1996 to 1998. It was later renamed to Kunstmuseum Appenzell.

=== Prime Tower ===
This skyscraper stood as Switzerland's tallest building from 2011 to 2015. It was planned in 2004 and constructed from January 2008 to December 2011 and currently serves as an office building. Since the construction of this skyscraper on the western outskirts of Zurich, the population in the area has increased by 4,000 and the number of jobs by 10,000.

=== Office Building Lagerstrasse ===
This office building was planned in 2006 and executed from 2007 to 2013. It is also known as Europaallee 21 and is part of an urban reconstruction project in Zurich. Gigon and Guyer collaborated on this building with Max Dudler and David Chipperfield.
