= Prime Tower =

Skyscraper in Zurich, Switzerland

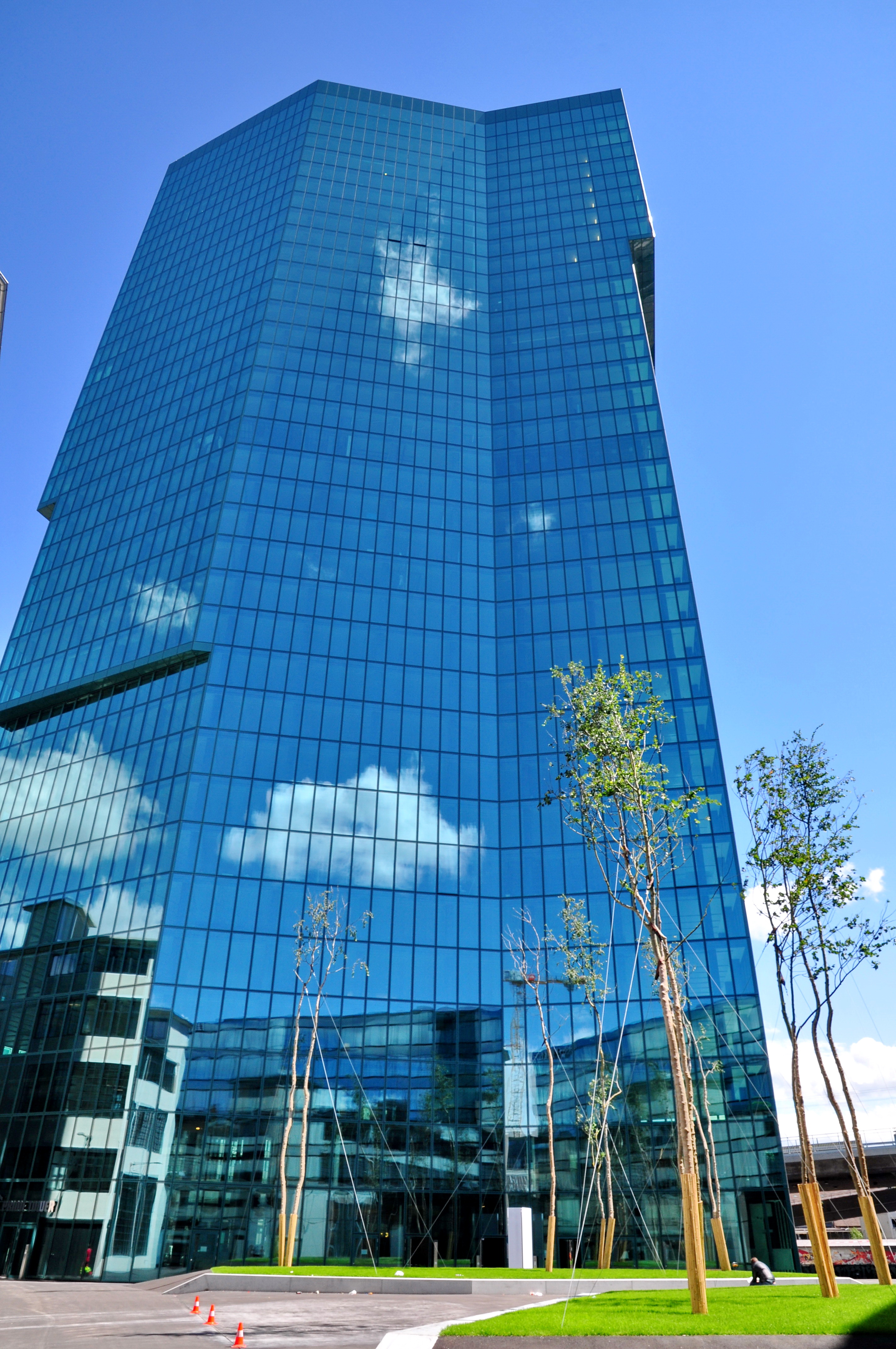
- View in August 2011

General information
- Type: Office
- Location: Zurich, Switzerland
- Coordinates: 47.3860°N 8.5172°E
- Construction started: 19 November 2008
- Completed: December 2011
- Opening: 6 December 2011
- Cost: CHF 380 million (USD 417 million)
- Owner: Swiss Prime Site AG

Height
- Roof: 126 m (413 ft)

Technical details
- Floor count: 36
- Floor area: 39,500 m^{2} (425,000 sq ft)

Design and construction
- Architect: Gigon/Guyer
- Developer: Swiss Prime Site AG
- Main contractor: Losinger (Bouygues)

Website
- www.primetower.ch/en/

The Prime Tower, also named "Maag-Tower" in an earlier stage of planning, is a skyscraper in Zürich, Switzerland, used mainly as office space. At a height of 126 metres (413 ft), it was the tallest building in Switzerland from 2011 until 2015, when the Roche Tower in Basel (standing at 178 m (584 ft)) was completed.

The Prime tower started its construction in 2008 and was completed in 2011. It is a modern skyscraper that demonstrates the essential role of mathematics in architecture. Engineers used geometry, measurements, and calculations to make sure the building could withstand gravity, wind, and minor earthquakes. The central core and columns carry the weight of the floors above, and help keep the structure stable.

The building is located near the Hardbrücke railway station in Zürich West of the Industriequartier. The tower replaced an industrial facility.

According to its developers, the tower's construction, which took 15 years to plan and execute, was a financial success, with its valuation based on lease rates exceeding the construction cost by CHF 110 million.

A webcam on top of the building offers a 360° view of Zürich.

== History ==
In November 2008, construction of the Prime Tower began with a foundation stone ceremony. The tower was developed at a cost of CHF 355 million and is part of a complex that includes two adjacent buildings, Cubus and Diagonal. It comprises 39,500 square metres of office space across 36 floors, including a restaurant on the 35th floor. The 126-metre tower was projected to become the tallest building in Switzerland when completed in 2011, though Roche Tower in Basel was expected to surpass it soon afterward.

== Residents ==
The tower and its two companion buildings, Cubus and Diagonal, are used primarily as office buildings. As of its opening in December 2011, the tower has a bar and restaurant (Clouds) on its top floor, a conference center, a hotel on the ground floor, and offices including Deutsche Bank Schweiz, Homburger, Transammonia, Korn/Ferry International, Citibank Switzerland, Infosys, Repower, Ernst & Young, and Zürcher Kantonalbank.

== Gallery ==
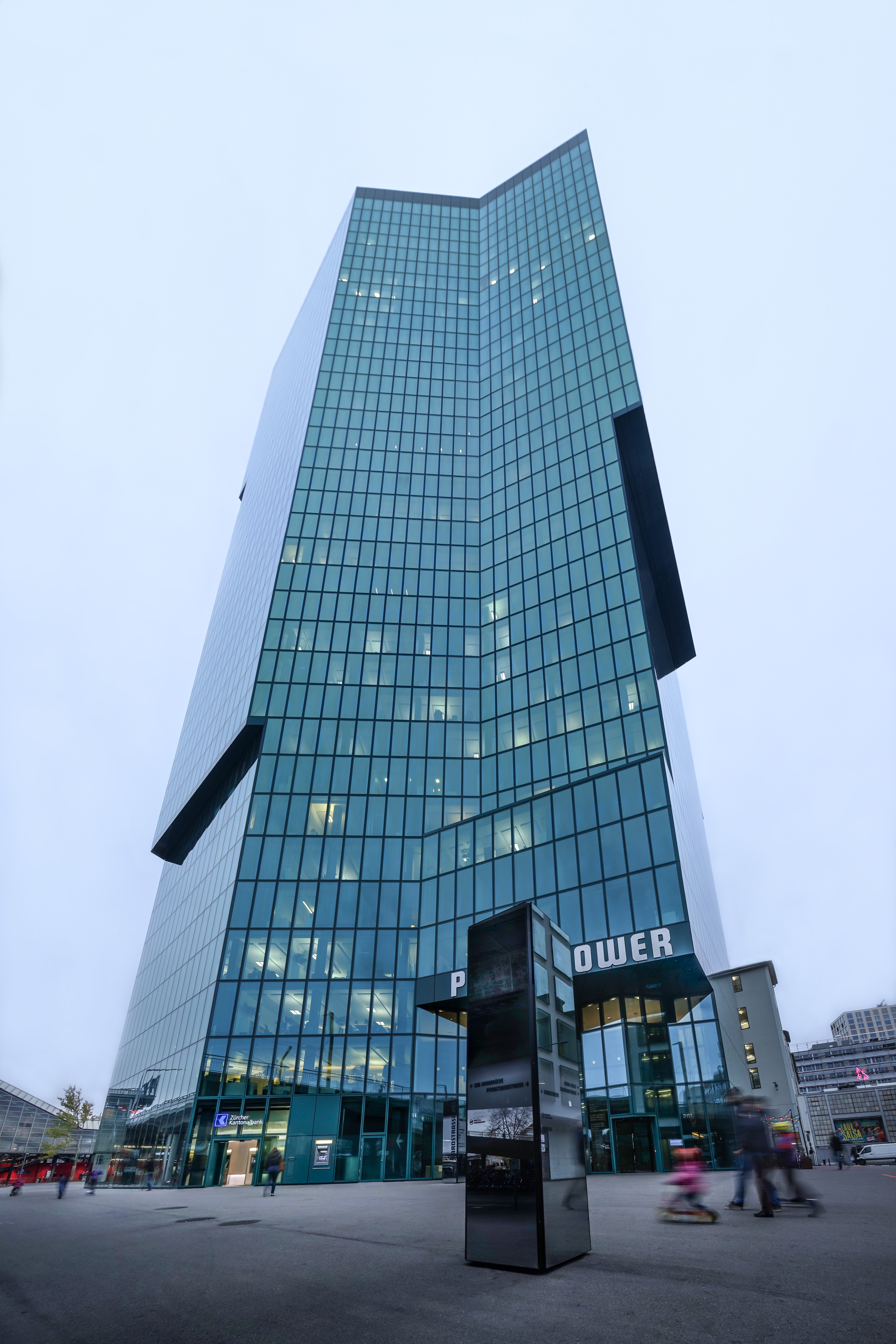
Prime Tower in daylight.

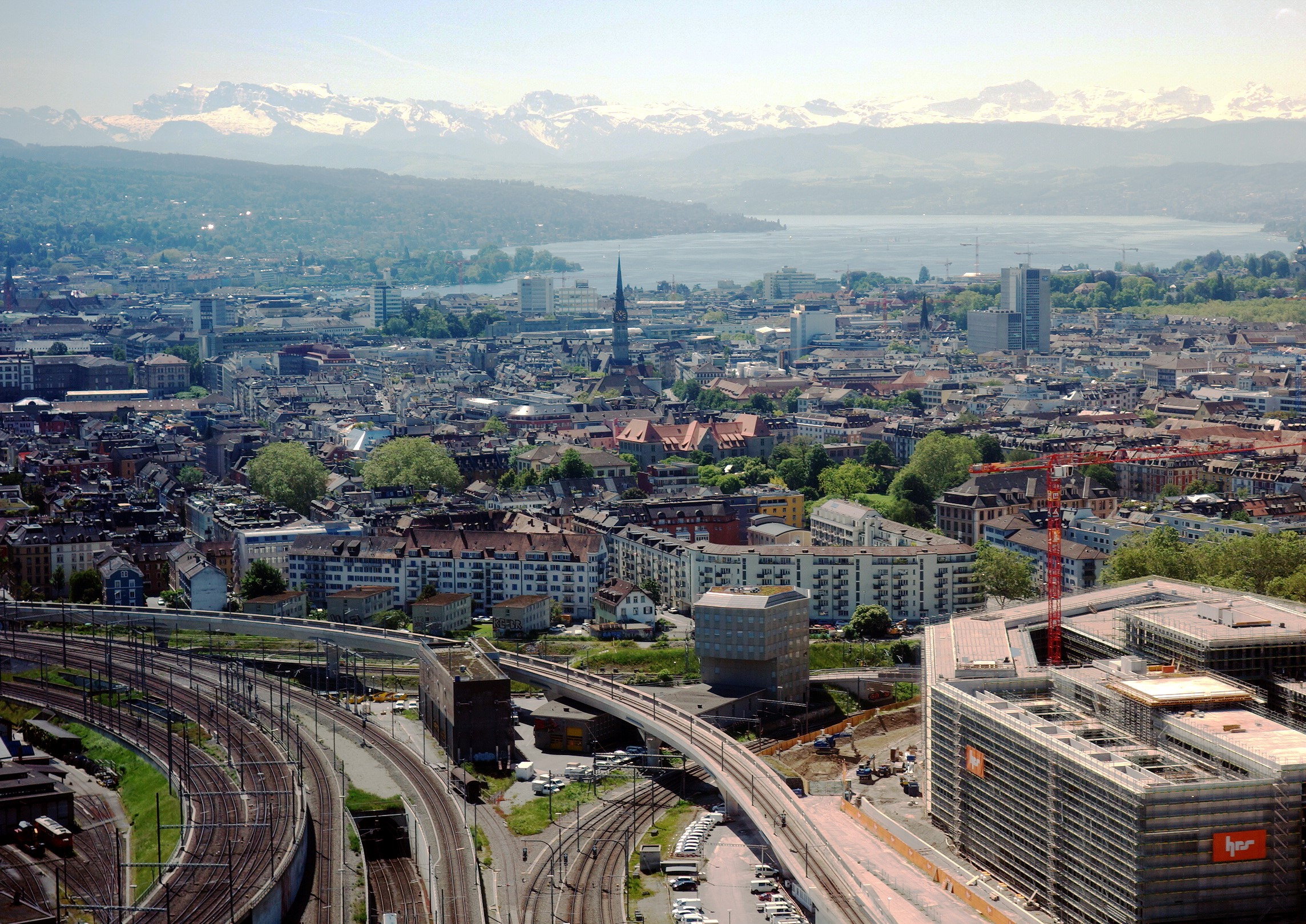
View from Clouds restaurant at the top of Prime Tower.

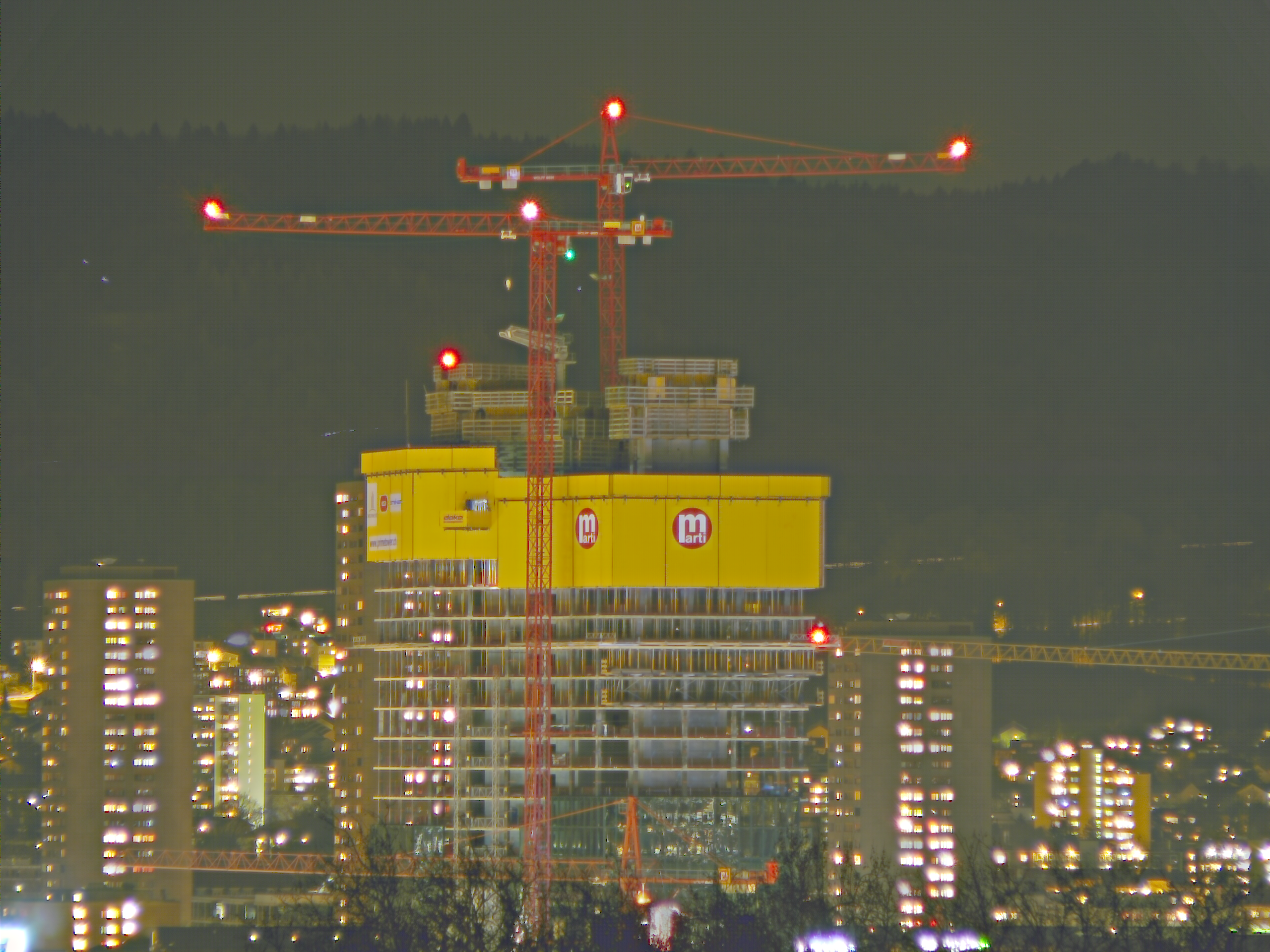
Prime Tower construction site at night, showing Marti's wind barrier system.

== See also ==
- Roche Tower
- Roche Tower 2
