= Roche Tower =

Skyscraper in Basel, Switzerland

Coordinates: 47.5583°N 7.6076°E

- Roche-Turm
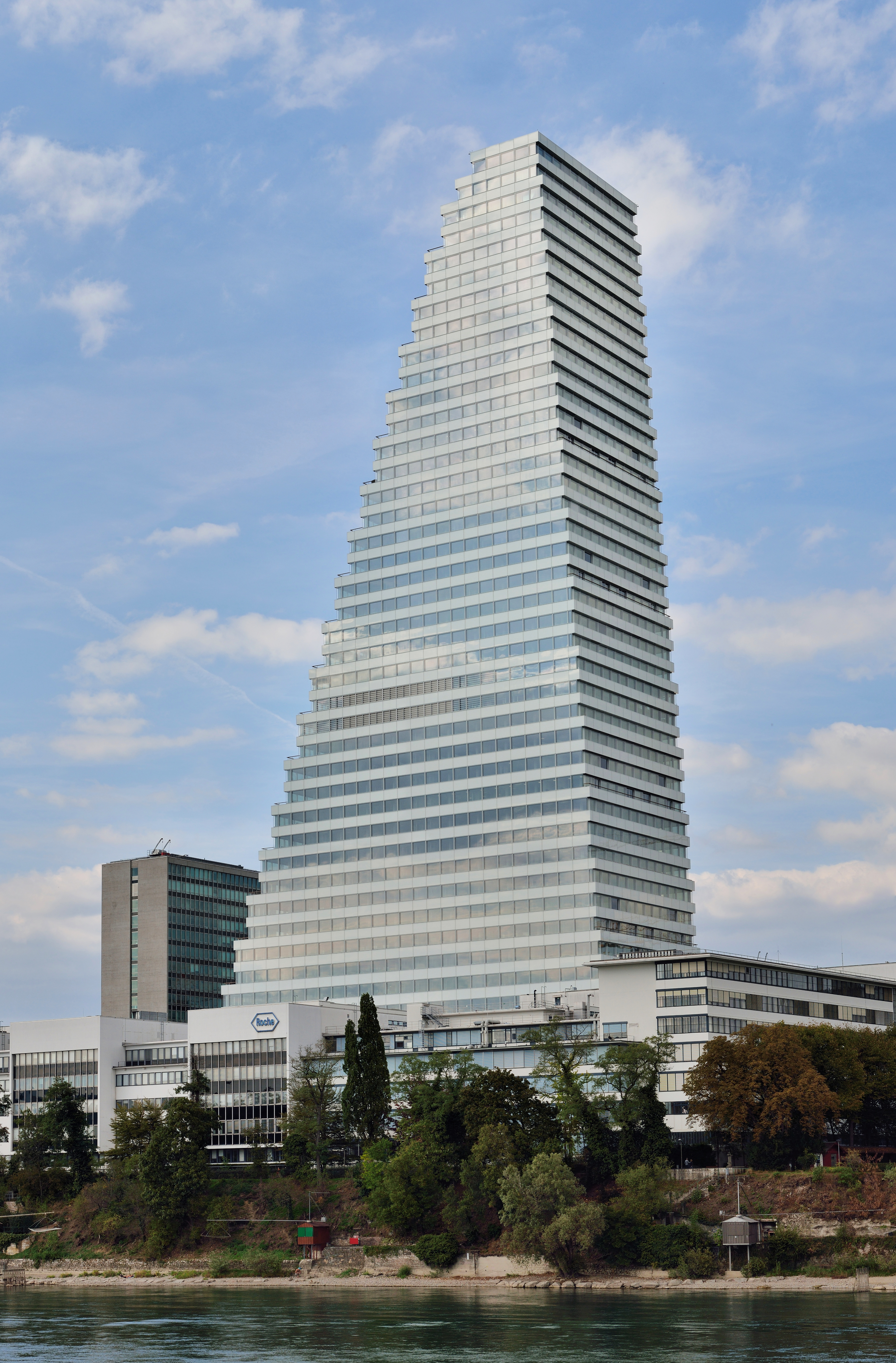
- Roche Tower in September 2015
- Interactive map of the Roche Tower area
- Alternative names: Building 1 (Bau 1)

Record height
- Tallest in Switzerland since 18 September 2015^{[I]}
- Preceded by: Prime Tower (Zürich)

General information
- Status: Open
- Type: Office
- Architectural style: Modernism
- Location: Basel, Switzerland, Grenzacherstrasse 124
- Named for: Hoffmann-La Roche
- Groundbreaking: 9 May 2012
- Opened: 18 September 2015
- Cost: CHF 550 million
- Owner: Hoffman-La Roche

Height
- Height: 178 m (584 ft)

Technical details
- Floor count: 41
- Floor area: 74,200 m^{2} (799,000 sq ft)

Design and construction
- Architecture firm: Herzog & de Meuron

Roche Tower (German: Roche-Turm), also known as Building 1 (German: Bau 1), is an office skyscraper in the Swiss city of Basel. Designed by Herzog & de Meuron for the pharmaceutical company Hoffmann-La Roche, it stands 178 metres (584 ft) tall with 41 floors. At the time of its opening, it was the tallest building in Switzerland, surpassing the Prime Tower (126 meters) in Zürich by 52 metres. The building has a total floor space of 74,200 m^{2} (799,000 sq ft) and cost CHF 550 million to construct. It houses around 2,000 employees.

In 2020, Roche Tower was overtaken in height by the adjacent 205-metre Building 2, also developed by Roche.

== History ==
Construction of Building 1 began in 2012, and it was officially inaugurated on 18 September 2015. Upon completion, it surpassed the Prime Tower in Zürich (126 m), which had been Switzerland’s tallest building for just under four years. Strict planning regulations in Swiss cities mean that there are few skyscrapers in the country.

== Architecture and engineering ==
The structure stands on 143 piles driven up to 24 metres (79 ft) into the ground, topped by a foundation slab intended to enhance stability in earthquakes. Basel lies in one of Switzerland’s highest-risk earthquake zones along with the canton of Valais. The tower was engineered to withstand a magnitude 6.9 earthquake on the Richter scale, a standard higher than legally required, corresponding to an event statistically expected once every 1,500 years.

The building features a closed-cavity facade that reduces cleaning requirements, provides solar shading, and maintains outward visibility. It also incorporates a well-insulated envelope and LED lighting with daylight-based controls, along with automated systems for light, ventilation, heating, and cooling. The heating, cooling, and ventilation systems use groundwater cooling along with waste-heat recovery.

== Gallery ==
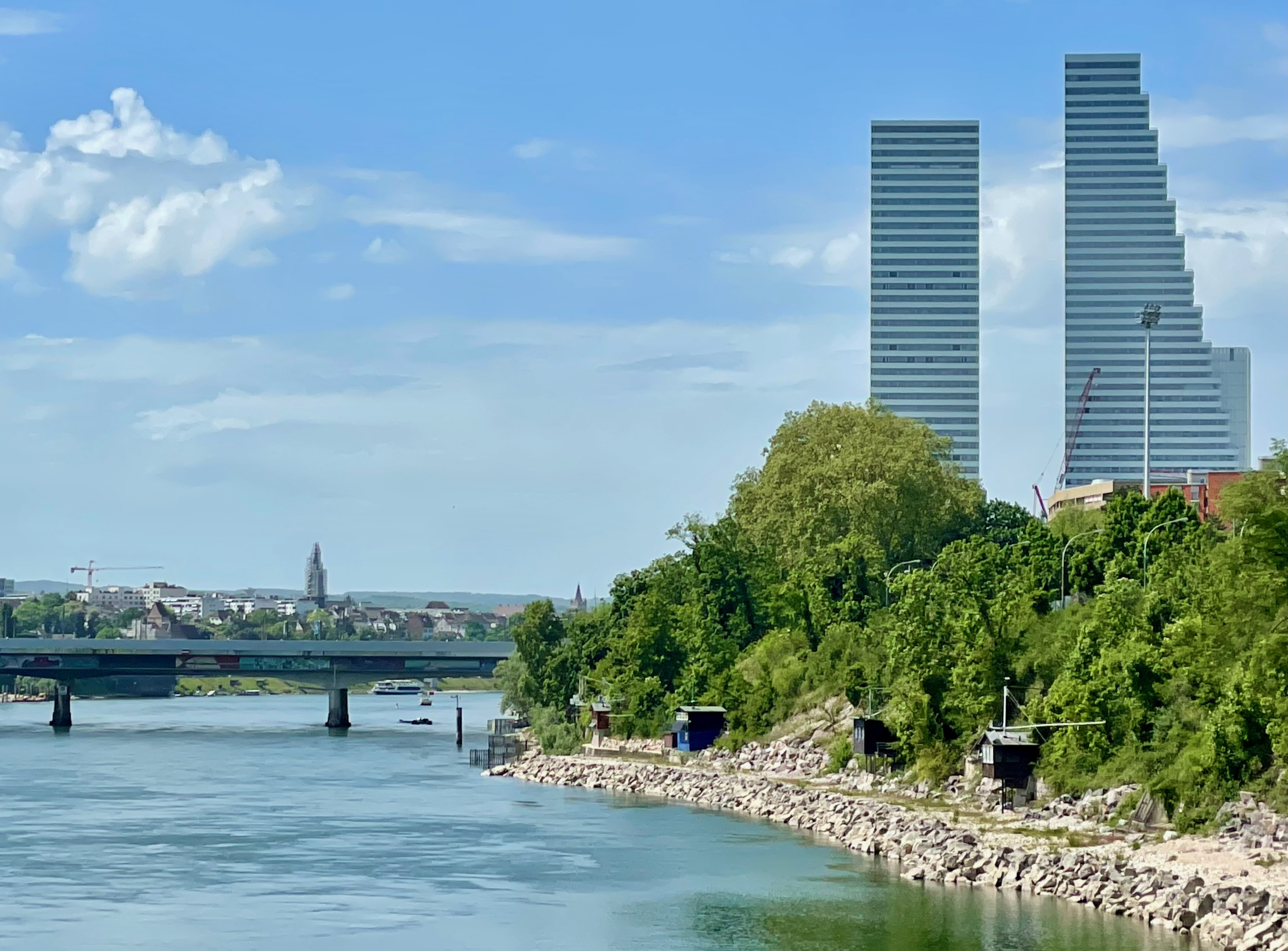
Roche Towers (Building 1 and 2) in Basel, Switzerland, with traditional fishing cranes in the foreground

== See also ==
- Architecture of Switzerland
- List of tallest buildings in Switzerland
- Prime Tower
- Roche Tower 2
