= Johannes Zollikofer =

Swiss reformed vicar

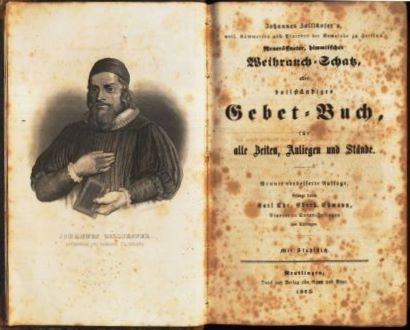
Johannes Zollikofer's Newly Opened Treasury of Heavenly Incense, or Christian's Companion: Containing Instructions and Devotional Exercises, Applicable to All Persons and Circumstances in Life.

Johannes Zollikofer (born 29 December 1633 in St. Gallen; died 23 April 1692 in Herisau) was a Swiss reformed vicar.

== Life and work ==
Johannes Zollikofer studied in Zürich and Basel. At the age of twenty he was called as a German vicar to Geneva. He later continued his studies in Oxford and Cambridge. He worked as a deacon in St. Leonhard and St. Gallen, and later as a vicar und chamberlain in Herisau in Appenzell Ausserrhoden. He was author and translator of many books.

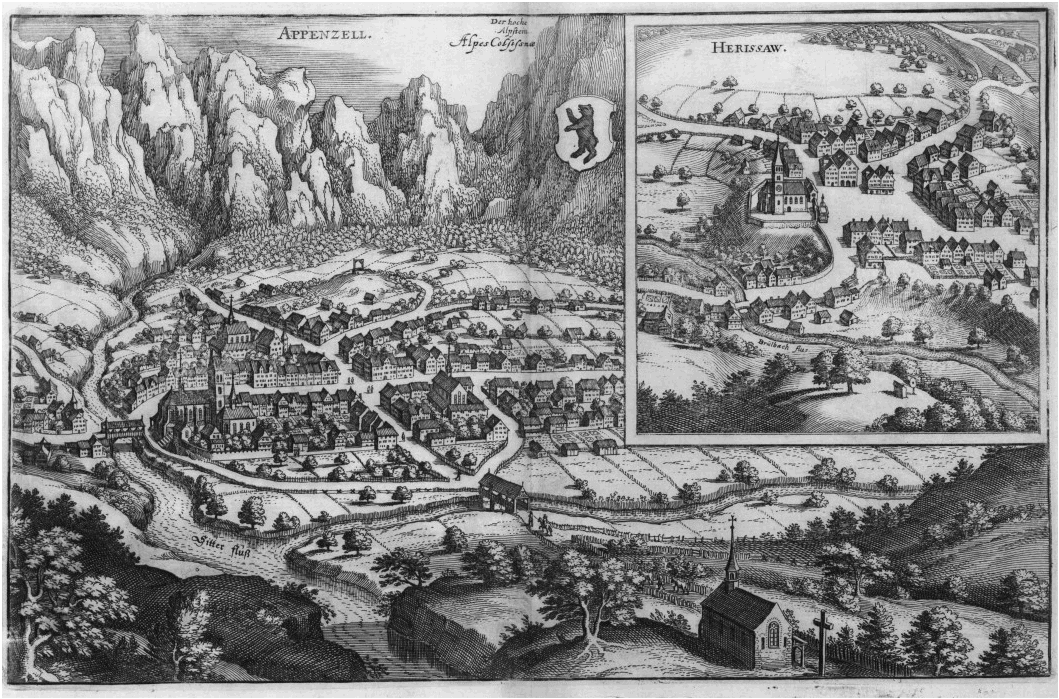
Herisau on a print of Matthäus Merian (in Topographia Helvetiae, Rhaetiae et Valesiae, 1654)

According to the Stemmatologia Sangallensis of Johann Jacob Scherrer (1653–1733) he was 1653–1692 vicar, 1653–1654 German Adjunkt in Geneva, 1655–1655 German assistant in Amsterdam, 1657–1692 Synodalis, 1657–1666 deacon in St. Leonhard, 1657–1692 Collega Disputat., 1657–1692 Collega music., 1660–1660 Bußner Coll. theol. I, 1665–1665 Bußner Coll. theol. II, 1666–1692 vicar in Herisau, (the 13th since the reformation), 1667–1692 Synodalis of Ausserrhoden, 1671–1692 Camerarius of Ausserrhoden and 1684–1692 Ordinari civil registry officer in Ausserrhoden.

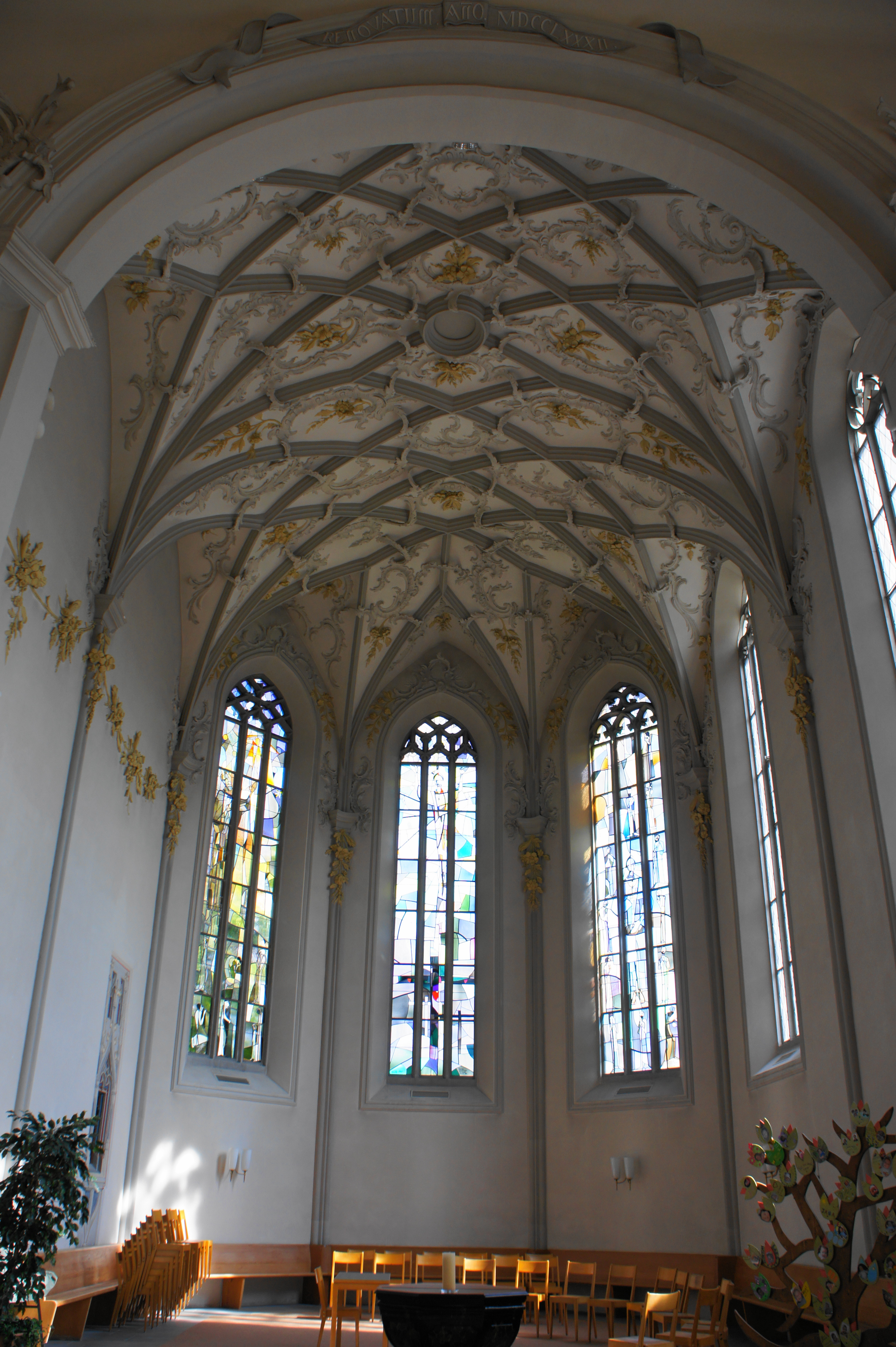
Church in Herisau, where Zollikofer worked from 1666 to 1692

Zollikofers sermon on The unholy fiends' miserable condition (Der unseligen Unholden elender Zustand), held on 5 May 1689 in Herisau and printed in the same year in St. Gallen, is based on the publication Magiologia - Christian warning regarding superstition and sorcery (Magiologia - Christliche Warnung für dem Aberglauben und der Zauberei) of Bartholomäus Anhorn the Younger, in which magical practices are criticised. Witch-hunts were conducted with reference to his sermon.

His master piece A Newly Opened Treasury of Heavenly Incense, or Christian's Companion: Containing Instructions and Devotional Exercises, Applicable to All Persons and Circumstances in Life (Himmlischer Weyhrauch-Schatz) was published in 1691 and reprinted in high numbers over 150 years.

The inscription H. Johannes Zollikofer, Pfarrer in a bell of the church in Herisau, which was cast in 1679, reminds on this vicar.

=== Family ===
Johannes Zollikofer was a son of Georg Zollikofer (1591–1634) and Judith Schobinger. He married on 3 November 1657 Catharina Gonzenbach (1631–1672), a daughter of Heinrich Gonzenbach and Sabina Zwicker. He had with her one baby daughter in 1663, who died without being christened, and 1665 a daughter Judith.

In his second marriage he married on 11 June 1672 Susanna Zollikofer (1644–1685 in Herisau), a daughter of Niklaus Zollikofer and Benigna Zollikofer and had with her four children: Magdalena (1673–1700 in Amsterdam), Georg Niklaus (1676–1706 in Eastern India), Johannes (born 1681), who died as a baby, and another Johannes (born 1683).

In his third marriage he married on 15 June 1686 Elisabeth Zollikofer (1656–1694), daughter of David Zollikofer and Elisabeth Högger and had with her three children: David (born 1688), Elisabeth (1690–1694) and Gottlieb (1691).
