= Conor Morrison (ice hockey) =

Swiss ice hockey player

- Born: 24 February 1989 (age 36) Herisau, Switzerland
- Height: 1.75 m (5 ft 9 in)
- Weight: 78 kg (172 lb; 12 st 4 lb)
- Position: Left wing
- Caught: Left
- Played for: Augsburger Panther; EC Kassel Huskies; Heilbronner Falken
- NHL draft: Undrafted
- Playing career: 2013–2016

Conor Morrison (born 24 February 1989 in Herisau, Switzerland) is a Swiss-born German former professional ice hockey player.

His father is Dave Morrison, a retired professional ice hockey player who is currently the Director of Amateur Scouting for the Toronto Maple Leafs. His grandfather is Jim Morrison, a retired former professional ice hockey defenceman, coach and scout.
