= Jörg Eugster =

Swiss author and blogger (born 1960)

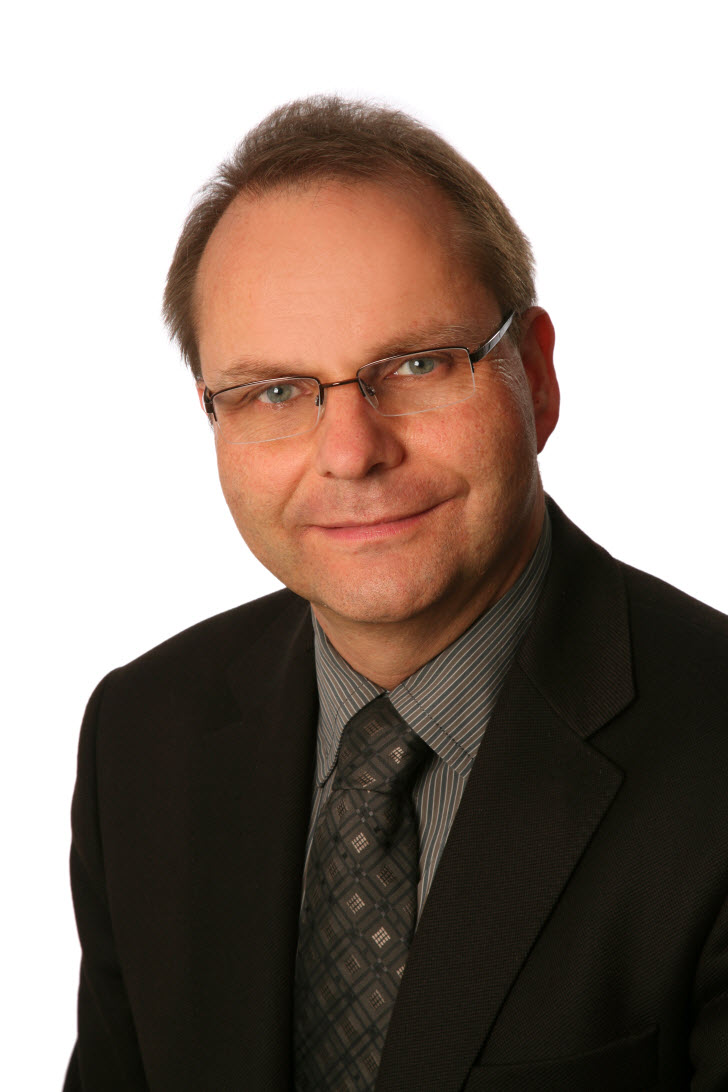
- Joerg Eugster in 2009
- Born: 4 January 1960 (age 65); Herisau, Switzerland
- Occupations: author, blogger, entrepreneur, online consultant, university lecturer

Jörg Eugster (born January 4, 1960) is a Swiss author and blogger.

== Life ==
Eugster was born on January 4, 1960 in Herisau. He graduated from the Lucerne University of Applied Sciences (1997–98). Since 2009 he runs the platform Wifimaku, where he provides e-books – currently 14 – on online marketing. The expert knowledge of 24 authors is available for free and always updated. On Google Play Books, since 2013, he has recorded more than 12,000 downloads from 63 countries.

Eugster founded the company Netbusiness Consulting, which is located in Vaduz (Principality of Liechtenstein). In addition, Eugster is the founder of the internet job platform Jobwinner, which he sold to Tamedia (Zürich) in 1999, the largest private media group in Switzerland. He co-founded the dating platform Swissfriends, which he sold in 2008 to the French-speaking publisher Edipresse (Lausanne). The portals founded by Eugster also include the tourism sites topin.travel, swisswebcams.ch, webcams.travel and lookr.com. He is also an expert member of Club 55 – an international network of marketing, sales and management experts. As an online consultant and university lecturer Eugster explores the question where technological and digital trends are heading.

== Publications ==
- Wie fischt man Kunden aus dem Internet. Publisher Marketing & Kommunikation. 2nd edition 2009, ISBN 978-3033012660
- Übermorgen. Eine Zeitreise in unsere digitale Zukunft. Publisher Midas Management 2017, ISBN 978-3907100738
