= Regina Thürlimann =

Swiss art collector

Regina Thürlimann (died 2002) was a Swiss art collector. She went by the nickname "Gin".

== Early life and emigration ==
Regina Thürlimann née Rohner, de Rebstein, was born in Switzerland and married Freddy Homburger in 1939 in Geneva. Together with her husband, Freddy Homburger, she amassed a substantial art collection in Switzerland. They came to the United States in 1941.

== Art collection ==
Works in her art collection included The Road to Versailles, Louveciennes, Snow, by Camille Pissarro (now in the Bührle collection at the Kunsthaus Zurich and a drawing by Claude Gillot, now at the Harvard Art Museum. Other works included Impressionist and Modern Art, Pre-Columbian Art, Southeast Asian and Indian Sculpture, Antiquities, Old Master drawings and prints.

In 1971, the collection was exhibited and a catalogue was published.

Freddy Homburger died in September 2001, and Regina died in January 2002.

In 2002, the collection was auctioned off at Christie's, including works by Raoul Dufy, Edgar Degas, Jean-Baptiste-Camille Corot.

Thürlimann-Homberger also donated to the Otto-Naegeli Prize for scientific achievement.

== See also ==
- Emil Georg Bührle
