= Jakob Heierli =

Swiss archaeologist

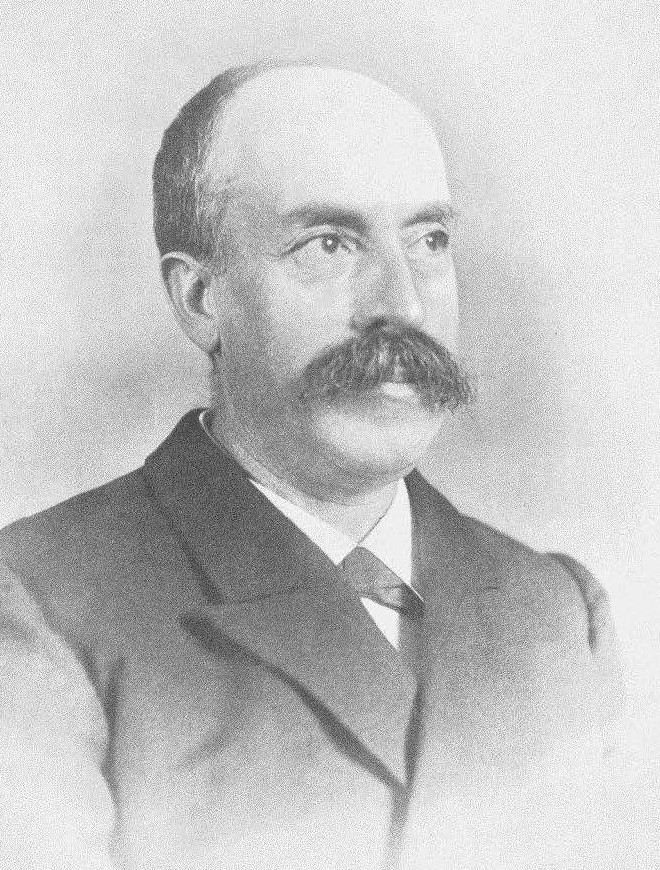
Jakob Heierli

Jakob Heierli (11 August 1853 – 18 July 1912) was a Swiss teacher, prehistorian and archaeologist.

== Biography ==
Jakob Heierli was born on 11 August 1853 in Herisau to Christian Heierli, a weaver, and Katharina Barbara, née Tanner. From 1871 to 1873 he attended the teacher-training college in Kreuzlingen and in 1873 he received his teachering certificate. From 1873 to 1875 he headed the local training school. From 1875 to 1879 he completed the secondary-school teacher-training at the University of Zurich and in 1879 he passed the examination to become a secondary-school teacher. From 1882 until his death he worked as a secondary-school teacher in Hottingen (today a part of Zürich).

From 1880 onwards, Heierli devoted himself to researching and popularizing Swiss prehistory in addition to his work as a teacher. He attended lectures at the University of Zurich, at the Zurich Polytechnic (today ETH Zurich) and took part in several geological expeditions and archaeological excavations.

Heierli was a member of the board of directors of the Antiquarian Society of Zürich until 1904. From 1888 to 1893 he was vice-president of the Ethnographic Society (later Geographic-Ethnographic Society) of Zürich. He was subsequently actuary of the society until his death.

As a docent at the University of Zürich, Heierli presented lectures in prehistory from 1889 to 1912; he also lectured at the Zurich Polytechnic from 1900. In 1901, the University of Zürich awarded him an honorary doctorate “in recognition of his services to research into the prehistory of Switzerland.” In France he was awarded the title “Officier d’Académie,” an order of knighthood reserved for academics and cultural and educational figures. In 1901, Heierli published Urgeschichte der Schweiz [The Prehistory of Switzerland], the first general overview of the subject.

In 1907, Heierli was a co-founder of the Swiss Society for Prehistory (today Archäologie Schweiz). He was its secretary until his death.

Heierli died in Zürich on 18 July 1912, a month short of his 59th birthday. He was survived by his wife of thirty years Julie Heierli-Weber, née Weber, whose field of study was the history of Swiss national costumes.

== Archaeology ==
Jakob Heierli took part in numerous archaeological excavations in Switzerland. He made archaeological maps for the cantons of Zürich, Thurgau, Aargau, Solothurn, Schaffhausen, St. Gallen and Appenzell. At the time of his death, he left sufficient material for an archaeological map of the whole of Switzerland in manuscript.

As Secretary General of the Swiss Society for Prehistory, Heierli compiled the Archäologische Landesdokumentation (National Archaeological Survey), which is now in the archives of Archäologie Schweiz. In this work, he created a dossier for each Swiss community, in which he filed reports of archaeological finds, letters, excavation notes, newspaper reports, etc., according to their respective archaeological epoch.

In his lectures, Heierli always endeavored to attract new people to the subject of Swiss prehistory. He also tried to arouse interest in it in the widest circles through popular scientific lectures and publications.

Heierli also attended various prehistoric excavations abroad and made numerous acquaintances with foreign researchers. He was a corresponding member of numerous foreign societies.
