= Markus Zürcher =

Swiss painter (1946–2013)

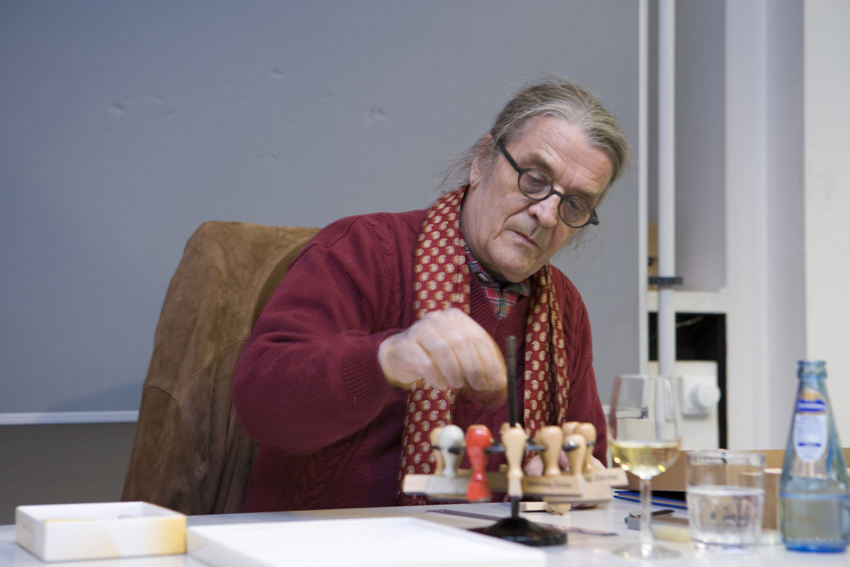
Markus Zürcher, 2009

Markus Zürcher (February 24, 1946 in Herisau – February 16, 2013) was a Swiss painter and representative of conceptual art and minimalism.

Zürcher completed his initial training as Schaufensterdekorateuer in St. Gallen, after which he shifted his residence to Bern. Subsequently, he attended free art courses and worked as stage designer. From 1971 to 1976 he studied painting at the Art Academy in Stuttgart, K.R.H. Sonderborg, then at the Gesamthochschule Kassel, studying sculpture and painting with Eberhard Fiebig, which he finished in 1983 with a diploma.

With linear and minimalist works, he was considered an important representative of the concept art, influenced by Lawrence Weiner, Daniel Buren, Meret Oppenheim and Robert Filliou.

Markus Zürcher was active in the Society of Swiss Painters, Sculptors and Architects, but left in the early 1990s, and retreated largely from the active art scene. Since 2000 he was once more active, instrumental in the field of painting and theoretical, conceptual work.

== Works and projects ==
His early work revealed a pronounced radicalism in dealing with minimal shapes; the use of color was largely avoided. Lithographs were created in limited editions, which emphasized this attitude. His later works, which as a whole had a unified, conceptual structure, actually played with colour.

He had collaborated with writer and author Raphael Urweider.

== Publications ==
- Neue Galerie Kassel (Hrsg.), Markus Zürcher, Zeichnungen, 1986.
- Berner Künstler stellen sich vor, GSMBA (Hrsg.), 1985.
- Werro/Sandoz/Blancone (Hrsg.); Der Blaue Berg - SOS 12, 1984.
- Zaugg/Egger; Lokaltermin Atelier, Verlag Bernische Kunstgesellschaft, 1987.
- Frammenti, Interfacce, Intervalli. Paradigmi della Frammentazione nell' Arte Svizzera. A cura di Viana Conti. Genova: Edizioni osta & nolan 1992, S. 154–155, 202–203.
- Us/Koselleck/Breitenstein (Hrsg.), Bürokartie, 2010, S. 46 ff.
