= Adolf Brunner (composer) =

Swiss composer

Adolf Brunner (Zurich, 25 June 1901-Thalwil, 15 February 1992) was a Swiss composer. He is best known for his conservative Markus-Passion (1971).
