= Bankhaus Veit L. Homburger =

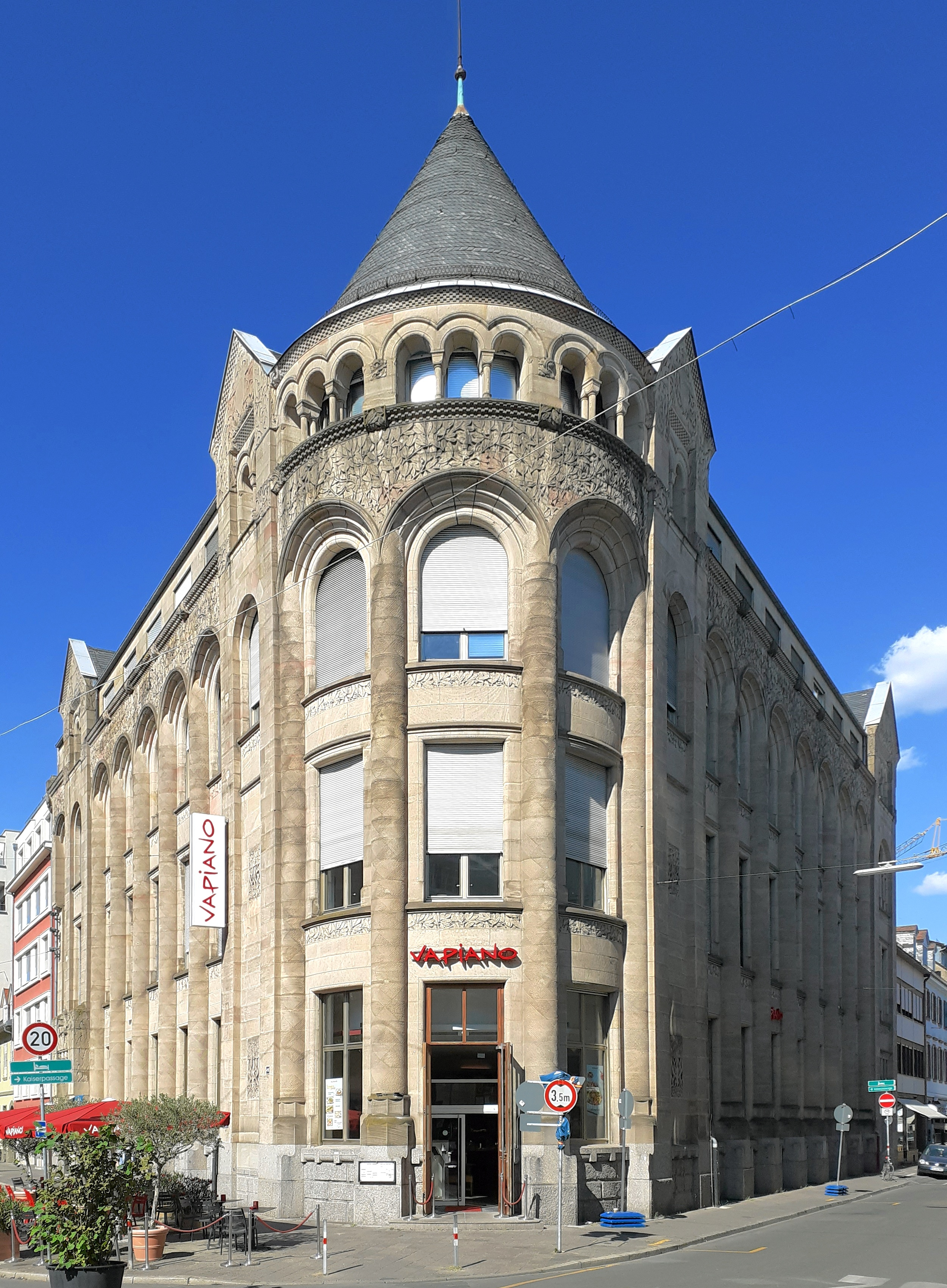
Former Bankhaus Homburger, Karlstraße 11

Bankhaus Veit L. Homburger in Karlsruhe was founded in 1854 by the Jewish citizen Veit Löw Homburger. The bank was liquidated by the National Socialists in 1939, but the bank building at Karlstraße 11 was preserved.

== History ==
The Homburger family was one of the oldest Jewish families in Karlsruhe. The first ancestor of the bank's founder, who was allowed to settle in Karlsruhe in 1722, was Löw from Homburg am Main, called Löw Homburger. Veit Löw Homburger (1810-1878) founded the bank in 1854 when he separated from his two brothers, with whom he ran his father's banking and exchange business. The two brothers Victor Veit Homburger (October 2, 1888 - May 31, 1968) and Paul Homburger (September 12, 1882 - May 19, 1965) each founded their own banks.

Between 1899 and 1901, the architects Curjel & Moser built a new listed building for the Veit L. Homburger bank at Karlstraße 9–11 on the corner of Akademiestraße. The sculptor Oskar Kiefer created the architectural decoration.

The writer Carl Einstein was apprenticed to the Homburger company around 1904.

== Nazi era ==
When the Nazis came to power in 1933, the bank was targeted by anti-Jewish boycotts. The Homburger children and grandchildren were interned or forced into exile, and the bank was Aryanized, that is, transferred to non-Jewish owners in accordance with Nazi racial laws. From the 1940s, the building was used by the Badische Kommunale Landesbank (Bakola), which after various mergers and name changes became the Baden-Württembergische Bank (BW-Bank), which continued to use the building until 2010. In the meantime, an Italian restaurant of the Vapiano chain is located on the ground floor.

== See also ==
- List of cultural heritage monuments in Innenstadt-West, Karlsruhe
- Paul Homberger
- List of banks in Germany

== Literature ==
- Esther Ramon: Die Familie Homburger aus Karlsruhe. In: Heinz Schmitt (Hrsg.): Juden in Karlsruhe. Beiträge zu ihrer Geschichte bis zur nationalsozialistischen Machtergreifung. Badenia-Verlag, Karlsruhe 1988 (2. überarbeitete Auflage 1990), ISBN 3-7617-0268-X, S. 465–468.
