= Roche Tower 2 =

Skyscraper in Basel, Switzerland

- Roche Turm Bau 2
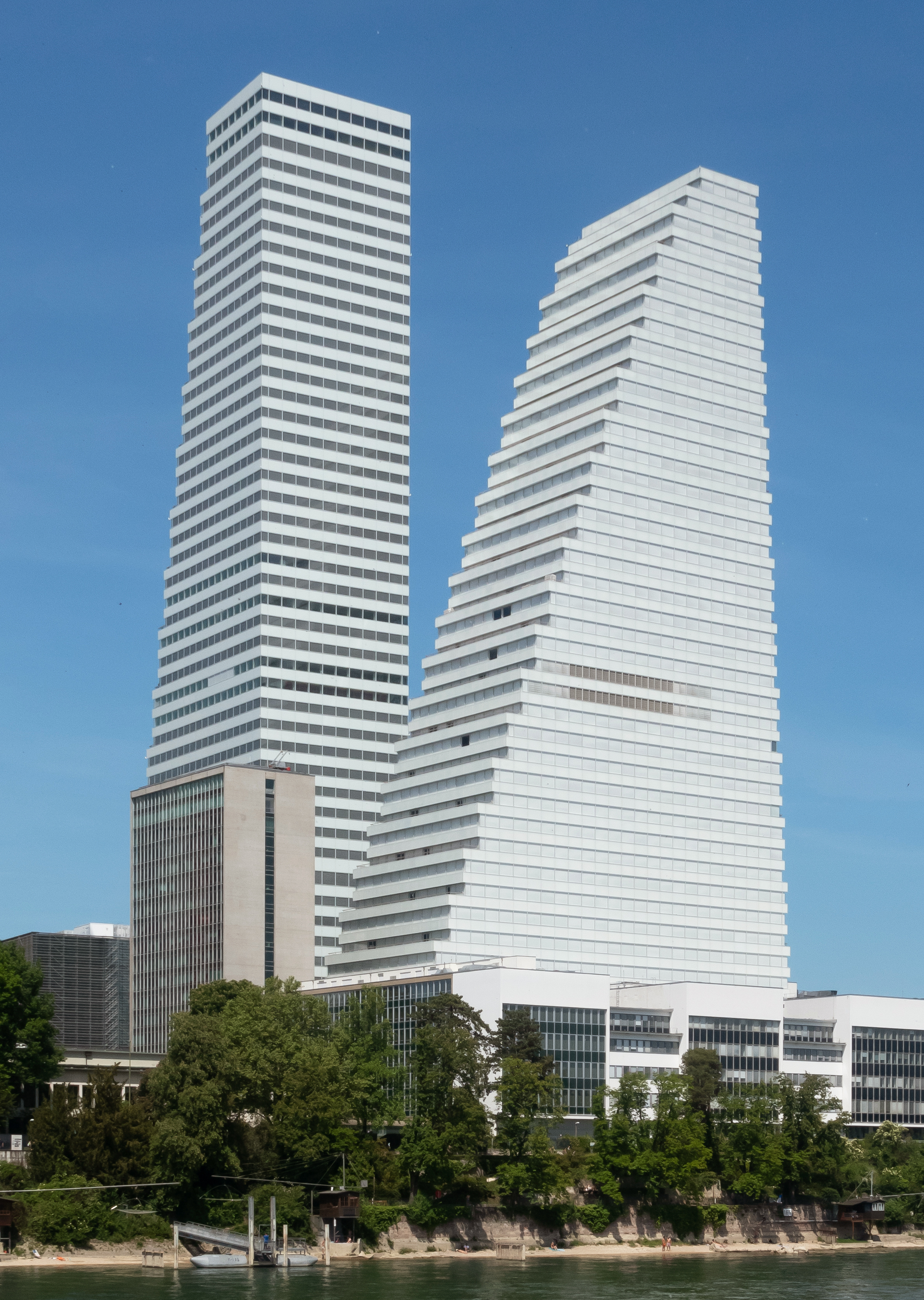
- Roche Tower 2 (left)
- Interactive map of the Roche Tower 2 area

General information
- Status: Completed
- Type: Office
- Location: Basel, Switzerland, Grenzacherstrasse 124
- Coordinates: 47.55945°N 7.60726°E
- Construction started: 2018
- Opened: 2 September 2022
- Cost: CHF 550 million
- Owner: Hoffman-La Roche

Height
- Architectural: 205 m (673 ft)

Technical details
- Floor count: 50

Design and construction
- Architecture firm: Herzog & de Meuron

Roche Tower 2 (German: Roche Turm Bau 2) is an office skyscraper in Basel, Switzerland. At 205 metres (673 ft), it became the tallest building in Switzerland upon its opening on 2 September 2022, surpassing its sibling structure, Roche Tower.

The tower was developed by pharmaceutical company Hoffmann-La Roche and designed by Swiss architecture firm Herzog & de Meuron. It comprises 50 floors and accommodates approximately 3,200 employees. It is also designed to withstand earthquakes up to a magnitude of 6.9.

== Architecture ==
The building has been likened to a "giant shark fin" rising over Basel’s skyline. It follows an “activity-based working” model, with flexible and shared workspaces rather than fixed desks. The ground floor contains a vertical garden designed by botanist and landscape architect Patrick Blanc. The tower incorporates sustainable construction principles, including modern building technology and environmentally conscious materials.

== History ==
In June 2016, the cantonal parliament of Basel-Stadt approved the construction of Roche Tower 2, with 84 votes in favor, two against, and five abstentions. It formed part of a broader CHF 3 billion investment in Roche’s Basel campus, which also included a new research facility. At the time, Roche Tower 2 was expected to be completed by 2021 and to surpass Roche Tower 1 as the tallest building in Switzerland. The project drew attention due to Switzerland’s restrictive urban planning regulations, which limit the construction of high-rise buildings.

== Gallery ==
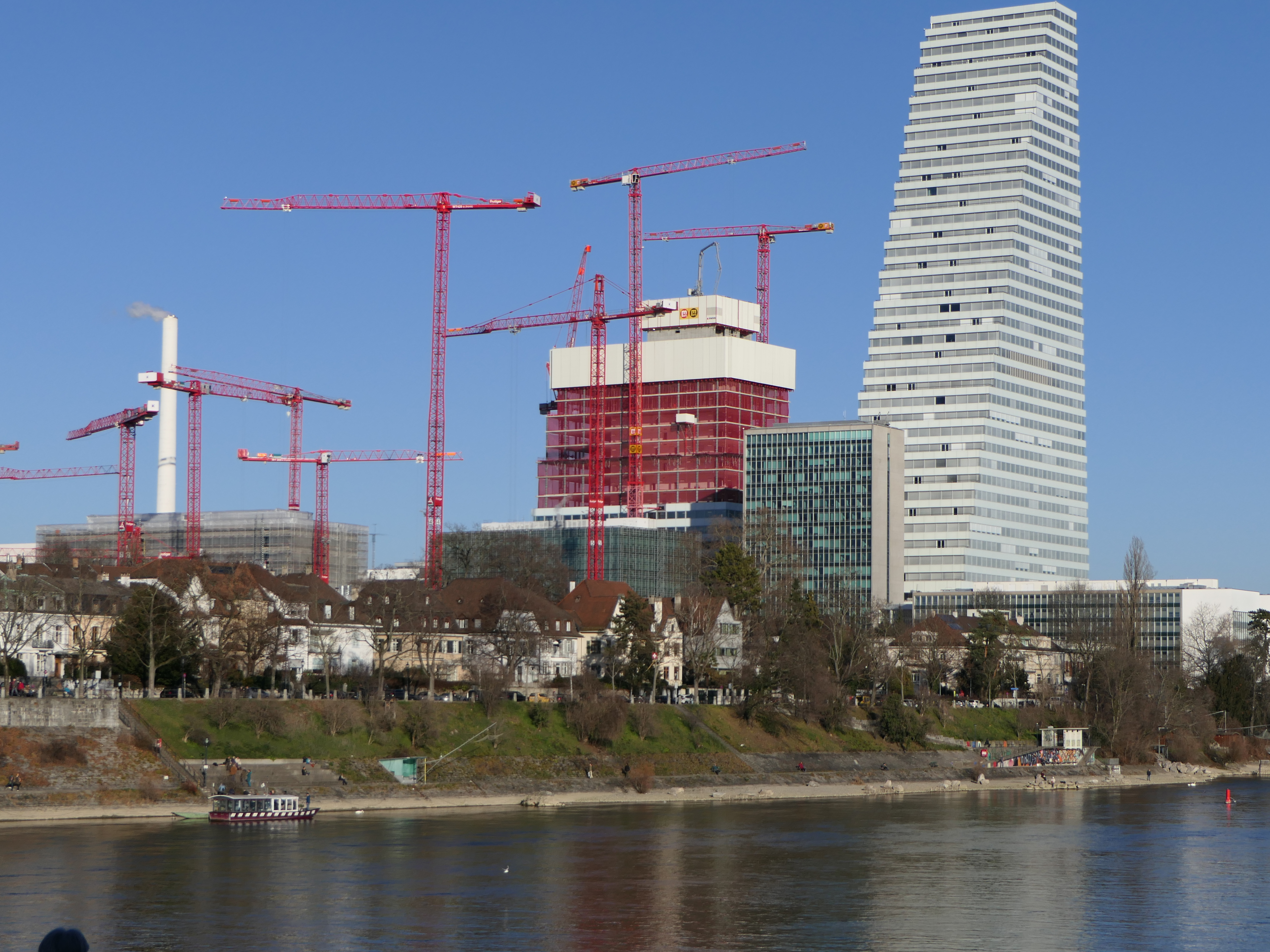
Construction site in January 2020

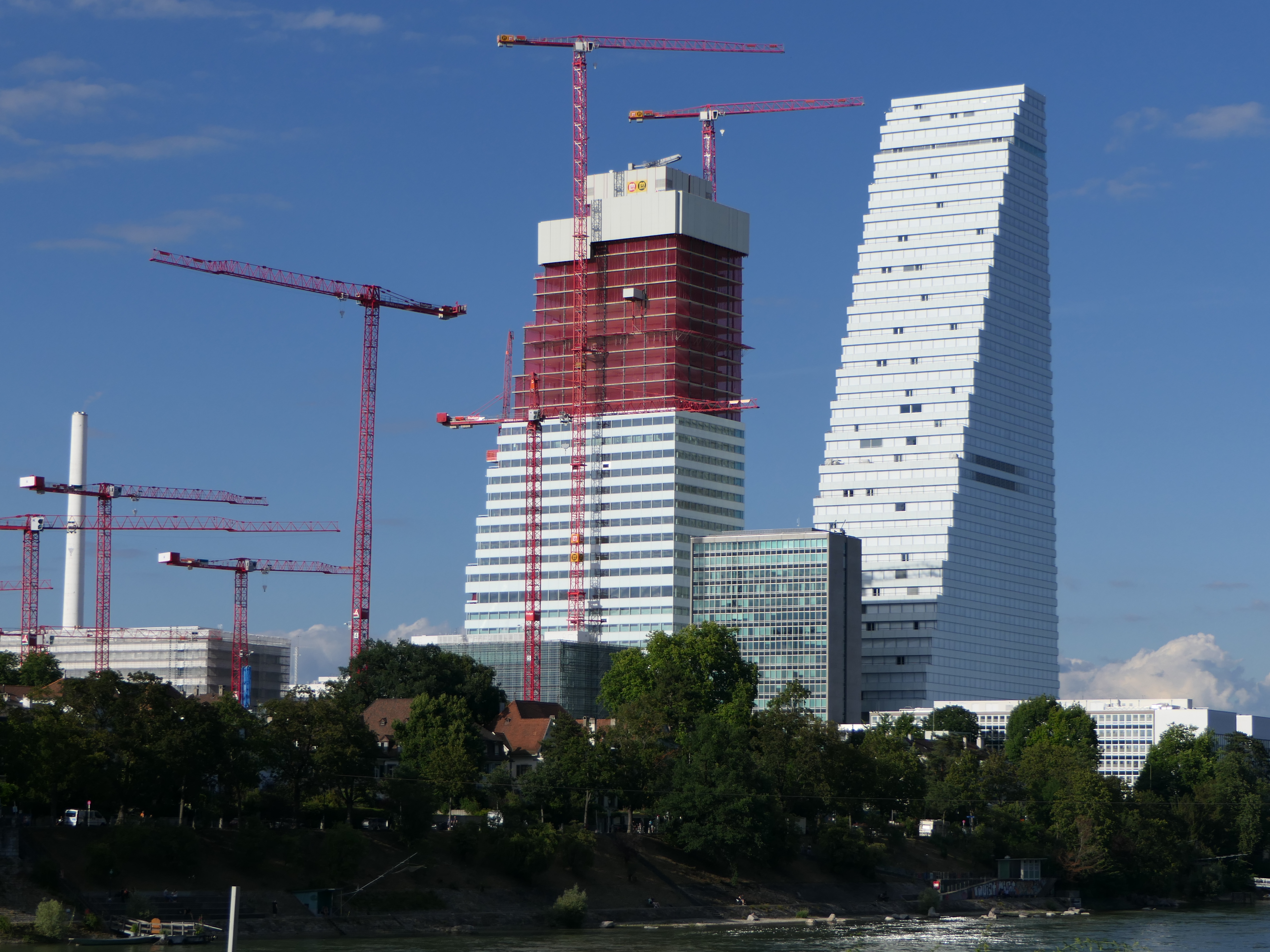
Construction site in June 2020

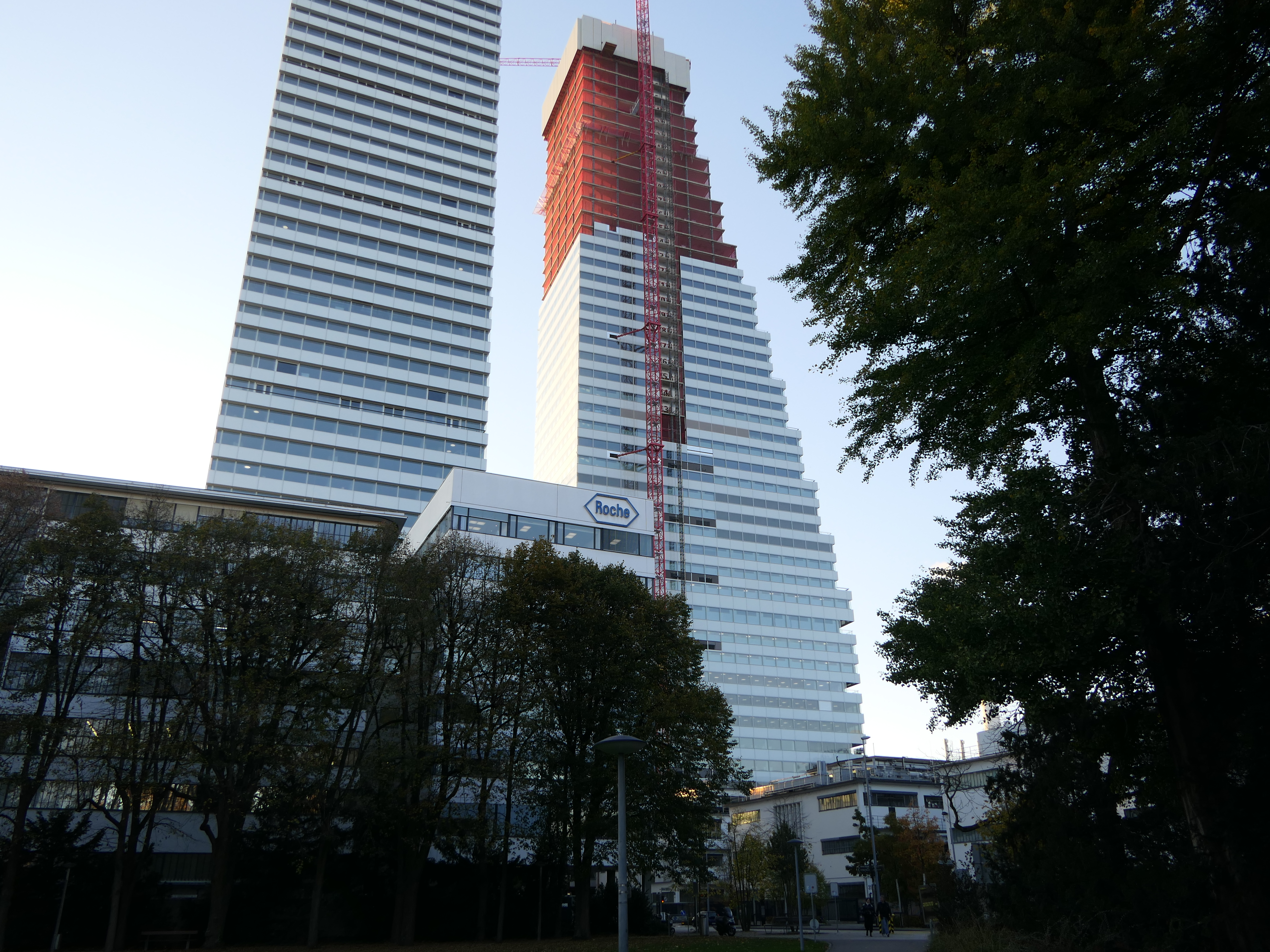
Construction site in October 2020

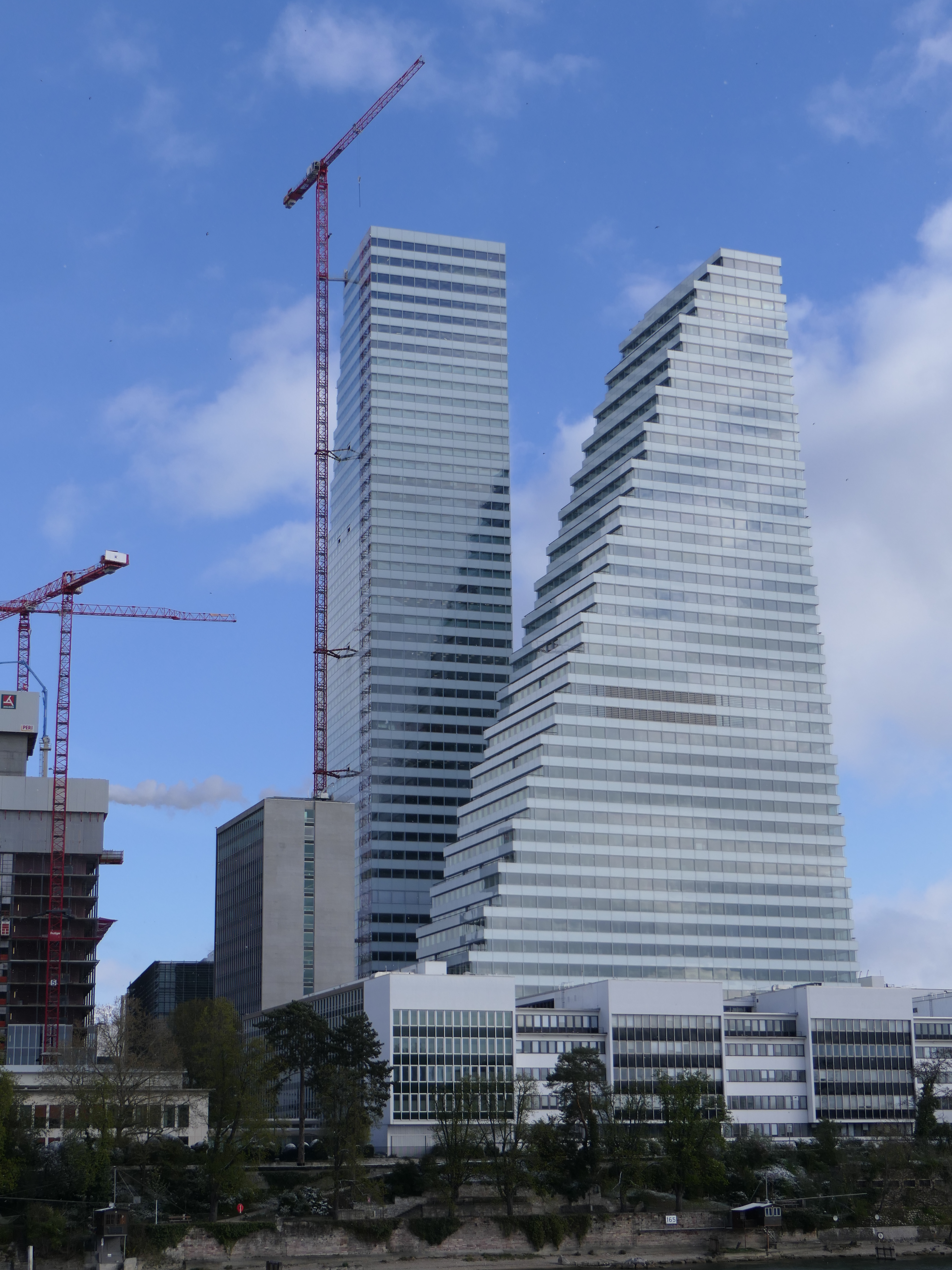
Construction site in April 2021

== See also ==
- List of tallest buildings in Switzerland
- Prime Tower
- Roche Tower
