= List of mayors of Herisau =

Coat of arms of Herisau

This is a list of mayors of the Herisau, Switzerland. The term to designated the mayor of Herisau used to be Gemeindehauptmann, currently Gemeindepräsident.

Mayor (Gemeindepräsident, Gemeindehauptmann) of Herisau
Term	Mayor	Lifespan	Party	Notes
1919–1923	Ferdinand Büchler	(1853–1935)		
1923–1929	Albert Lutz	(1872–1929)		
1929–1945	Ulrich Gschwend			
1945–1961	Hans Bänziger	(1908–1972)		
1961–	Adolf Brunner			
1969–1982	Hans Mettler			
1982–1989	Richard Kunz			
1989–1997	Walter Nyffeler			
1998–2004	Kurt Kägi		FDP/PRD	
2004	Max Nadig			ad interim
2004–2013	Paul Signer	(born 1955)		
2013–2014	Hans Stricker			ad interim
2014–2019	Renzo Andreani		SVP/UDC	
2019–present	Kurt Geser			
