= Freddy Homburger =

Freddy Homburger (8 February 1916 in Sankt Gallen, Switzerland- 25 September 2001 in Cambridge, Massachusetts) was a Swiss-born oncologist. Homburger came to the United States in 1941 to continue his medical education, becoming a citizen in 1952.

In 1948 Homberger was appointed head of Tufts College Medical School cancer research and cancer control units. In 1973, Homburger was studying the cause of cancer and its relation with cigarette smoking. He succeeded in inducing laryngeal cancer in hamsters who smoked; however, the Council for Tobacco Research, which was underwriting his research, forbid him to publish his research results as long as he referred to the growths as "cancerous", and threatened to ruin him financially.

Homburger, and his suppressed research, gained prominence in 1997 in tobacco-related lawsuits.

Homberger was also an artist, an aviator and served as Honorary Consul for Switzerland in Boston from 1966 to 1986.

Homberger and his wife Regina Thürlimann collected art and engaged in philanthropical activity.
