= Herisau =

- Municipality
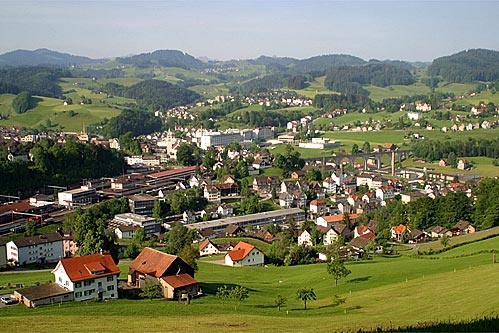

- Flag Coat of arms
- Location of Herisau
- Location within Switzerland Location within Canton of Appenzell Ausserrhoden
- Coordinates: 47°23′N 9°16′E
- Country: Switzerland
- Canton: Appenzell Ausserrhoden
- District: n.a.

Government
  - Executive: Gemeinderat with 7 members
  - Mayor: Gemeindepräsident (list); Kurt Geser (as of June 2019)
  - Parliament: Einwohnerrat with 31 members

Area
  - Total: 25.17 km^{2} (9.72 sq mi)
- Elevation: 771 m (2,530 ft)

Population (December 2008)
  - Total: 15,527
  - Density: 616.9/km^{2} (1,598/sq mi)
- Time zone: UTC+01:00 (CET)
  - Summer (DST): UTC+02:00 (CEST)
- Postal code: 9100
- SFOS number: 3001
- ISO 3166 code: CH-AR
- Surrounded by: Degersheim (SG), Flawil (SG), Gossau (SG), Hundwil, St. Gallen (SG), Schwellbrunn, Stein, Waldstatt
- Website: www.herisau.ch

Herisau (Swiss Standard German pronunciation: [ˈhɛrizaʊ]) is a municipality and the capital of the canton of Appenzell Ausserrhoden in Switzerland. It is the seat of the canton's government and parliament; the judicial authorities are situated in Trogen.

The central hamlet and the houses around the central square, the Protestant church of 1580, the houses Wetter and zur Rose (both 1737), the hamlet Schwänberg and the government building with the state archive are listed as heritage sites of national significance.

Together with other Alpine towns Herisau engages in the Alpine Town of the Year Association for the implementation of the Alpine Convention to achieve sustainable development in the Alpine Arc. Herisau was awarded Alpine Town of the Year 2003.

== History ==
Aerial view from 300 m by Walter Mittelholzer (1920)

Herisau was first mentioned in 837 as Herinisauva, and its church is mentioned in 907. In 1084 Herisau was destroyed as part of battles around the monastery in St. Gallen. In 1248 and 1249 the town was destroyed again, this time by the monastery to establish loyalty. In 1401 Herisau joined an alliance with other places in Appenzell as part of the Appenzell Wars.

Between 1517 and 1518 Herisau managed to buy itself free from the monastery. The town hall was built in 1601. In 1606 the town was largely destroyed by a fire. In 1648 Schwellbrunn separated and became an independent village. Between 1798 and 1803 Herisau was the capital of the canton Säntis.

== Geography ==
Herisau has an area, as of 2006, of 25.2 km^{2} (9.7 sq mi). Of this area, 56.8% is used for agricultural purposes, while 27.1% is forested. Of the rest of the land, 15.5% is settled (buildings or roads) and the remainder (0.6%) is non-productive (rivers, glaciers or mountains).

The municipality is located in the former District of Hinterland. It is located at the crossing point of two major routes through the region, the St. Gallen-Toggenburg road and the Gossau-Appenzell road. In addition to being the capital of the half canton, about one-third of the population of the entire half canton lives in Herisau. It consists of the village of Herisau and scattered hamlets as well as bedroom communities and industrial sections. Before 1648 it controlled about twice the land area as is currently part of the municipality. Until 1648 Schwellbrunn was part of the municipality and until 1720, Waldstatt was part of Herisau.

== Demographics ==
Herisau has a population (as of 2008) of 15,527, of which about 17.9% are foreign nationals. Over the last 10 years the population has decreased at a rate of -5.2%. Most of the population (as of 2000) speaks German (87.0%), with Serbo-Croatian being second most common (3.8%) and Italian being third (3.4%).

As of 2000, the gender distribution of the population was 49.6% male and 50.4% female. The age distribution, as of 2000, in Herisau is; 1,194 people or 7.5% of the population are between 0–6 years old. 1,775 people or 11.2% are 6-15, and 835 people or 5.3% are 16–19. Of the adult population, 945 people or 6.0% of the population are between 20–24 years old. 4,760 people or 30.0% are 25–44, and 3,831 people or 24.1% are 45–64. The senior population distribution is 1,702 people or 10.7% of the population are between 65–79 years old, and 840 people or 5.3% are over 80.

In the 2007 federal election the FDP received 76.7% of the vote.

The entire Swiss population is generally well educated. In Herisau about 66.2% of the population (between age 25-64) have completed either non-mandatory upper secondary education or additional higher education (either university or a Fachhochschule).

=== Historical population ===
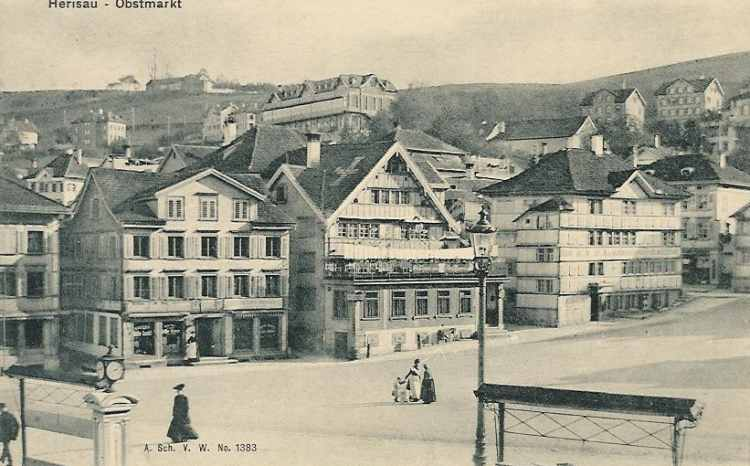
Herisau about 1900

The historical population is given in the following table:

year	population	Swiss Citizens	% German Speaking	% Protestant	% Roman Catholic
1667	3,021				
1734	4,816				
1780	5,933				
1813	6,863				
1830	7,014				
1850	8,387	8,189		97.1%	2.9%
1870	9,705	9,481		92.9%	6.2%
1888	12,937	12,082	98.9%	87.7%	12.0%
1900	13,497	12,426	98.1%	84.9%	14.7%
1910	15,336	13,550	95.0%	81.4%	18.0%
1930	13,599	12,784	98.4%	82.8%	16.6%
1950	13,407	12,819	97.6%	80.6%	18.6%
1970	14,597	12,128	86.0%	66.3%	31.3%
1990	15,624	12,731	84.6%	55.3%	34.1%
2000	15,882	12,535	87.0%	48.3%	32.1%

== Weather ==
Herisau has an average of 154 days of rain per year and on average receives 1,413 mm (55.6 in) of precipitation. The wettest month is July during which time Herisau receives an average of 167 mm (6.6 in) of precipitation. During this month there is precipitation for an average of 13.9 days. The month with the most days of precipitation is May, with an average of 15.3, but with only 142 mm (5.6 in) of precipitation. The driest month of the year is February with an average of 82 mm (3.2 in) of precipitation over 13.9 days.

== Economy ==
Herisau is located in the centre of eastern Switzerland. As early as 1537 it established itself as an important centre of trade and commerce.

Herisau has an unemployment rate of 2.01%. As of 2005, there were 340 people employed in the primary economic sector and about 115 businesses involved in this sector. 2,959 people are employed in the secondary sector and there are 189 businesses in this sector. 4,505 people are employed in the tertiary sector, with 651 businesses in this sector.

== Transport ==
The municipality has three railway stations: Herisau, Schachen (Herisau), and Wilen.

== Sport ==
SC Herisau plays in the Swiss 1. Liga.

== Notable residents ==
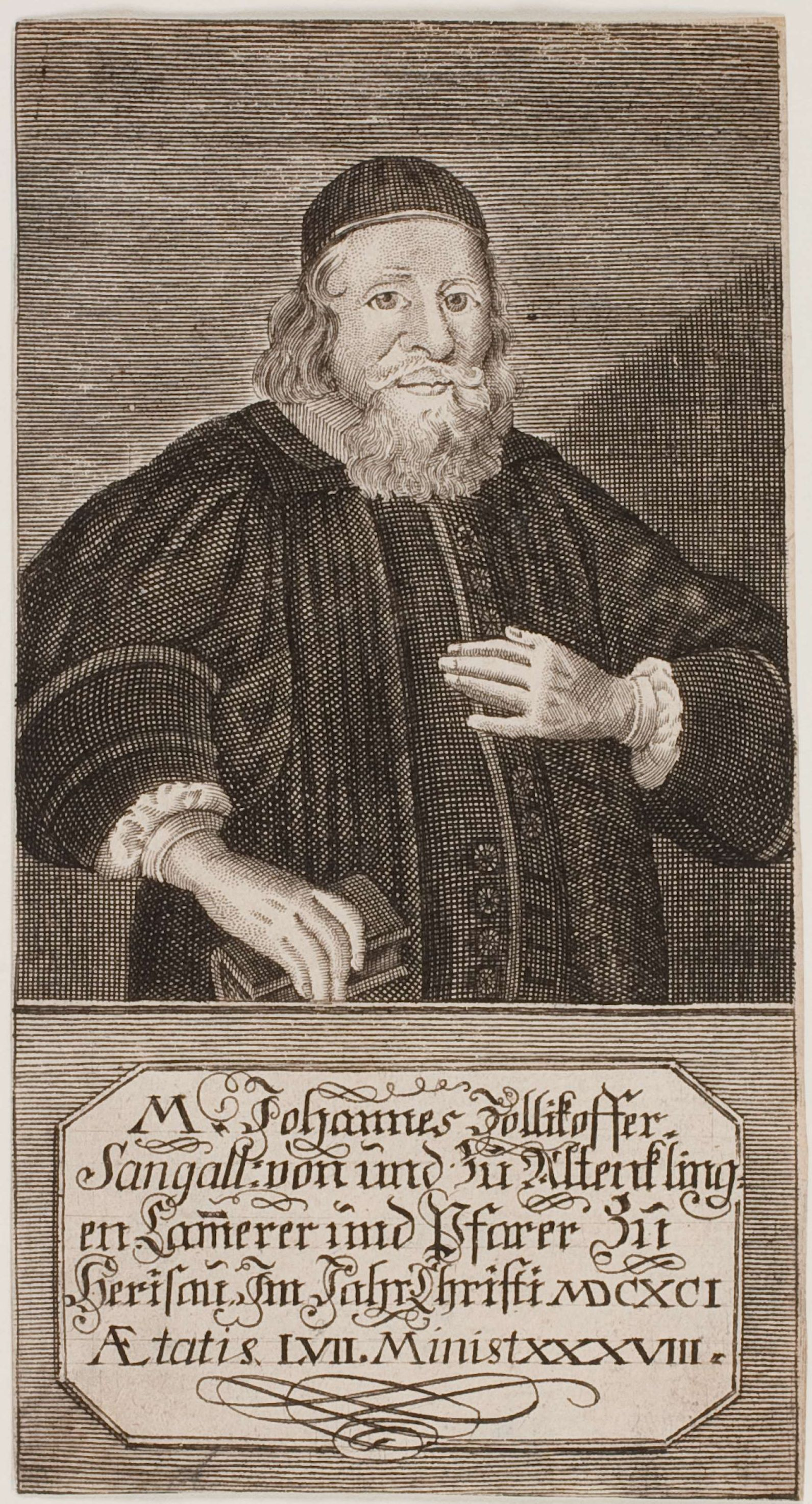
Johannes Zollikofer, 1691

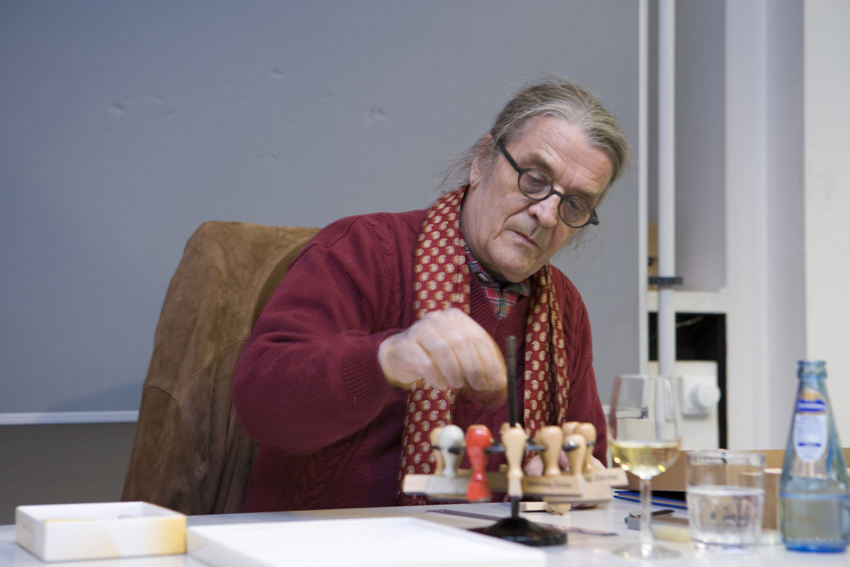
Markus Zuercher, 2009

- Johannes Zollikofer (1633–1692), priest, lived in Herisau from 1666 to his death
- Santiago Roth (1850 – 1924), a Swiss Argentine paleontologist; born in Herisau
- Jakob Heierli (1853–1912), the Swiss archaeologist and prehistorian, was born in Herisau
- Emil Sonderegger (1868–1934), military officer, became involved in far right politics; born in Herisau
- Johannes Baumann, (1874–1953), member of the Swiss Federal Council (1934–1940)
- Adolf Naef (1883–1949), a Swiss zoologist and palaeontologist, worked on cephalopods; born in Herisau
- Hermann Rorschach, (1884–1922), psychologist
- Robert Walser (1878–1956), German speaking Swiss writer
- Nikolaus Senn (1926–2014), former co-director of Schweizerische Bankgesellschaft
- Hans-Rudolf Merz, (born 1942), member of the Swiss Federal Council (2003–2010)
- Markus Zürcher (1946–2013), Swiss visual artist, representatives of conceptual art
- Ruth Erat (born 1951), Swiss teacher, writer, painter and politician
- Paul Giger (born 1952), violinist and composer
- Theresia Rohner (born 1954), campaigned for women's suffrage in Appenzell Innerrhoden
- Annette Gigon (born 1959), a Swiss architect, born in Herisau
- Jörg Eugster (born 1960), a Swiss author and blogger, born in Herisau
- Karin Karinna Bühler (born 1974), Swiss visual artist, born in Herisau

Sport

- Fredy Lienhard, Sr. (born 1947), a Swiss racing driver.
- Jörg Eberle (born 1962), Swiss ice hockey player
- Mathias Rusterholz (born 1971), Swiss athlete, holds the Swiss 400 meter record
- Jonas Hiller, (born 1982), Swiss ice hockey goaltender, currently playing for EHC Biel
- Beat Forster (born 1983), Swiss ice hockey player, currently playing for EHC Biel
- Conor Morrison (born 1989), a professional ice hockey player; born in Herisau
- Timo Meier, (born 1996), Swiss ice hockey player, currently playing for the New Jersey Devils
