= Paul Homburger =

German Jewish lawyer and art collector (1882-1965)

- Born: 1882; Karlsruhe
- Died: 1965; New York
- Occupation: Art collector

Dr. Paul Philipp Homburger (1882-1965) was a German Jewish lawyer, banker and art collector who was persecuted by the Nazis

== Family and professional life ==
The Homburger family was one of the oldest Jewish families in Karlsruhe. The first ancestor of the bank's founder, who was allowed to settle in Karlsruhe in 1722, was Löw from Homburg am Main, called Löw Homburger. Veit Löw Homburger (1810-1878) founded the Bankhaus Veit L. Homburger in 1854 when he separated from his two brothers, with whom he ran his father's banking and exchange business. The two brothers each founded their own banks. From 1899 to 1901, the architects Curjel & Moser built a new building for the bank Veit L. Homburger at Karlstraße 9–11 on the corner of Akademiestraße, which is now a listed building. The building decoration was created by the sculptor Oskar Kiefer.

Homburger was the executor of the will of Bertha Pappenheim, a patient of Sigmund Freud known as the famous "Anna O.

== Nazi persecution and emigration ==
When the Nazis came to power in Germany in 1933, Homburger was persecuted because of his Jewish heritage. Nazi incited boycotts led to the Aryanization of his family's bank, the seizure of his property and his flight to the United States.

== Death and legacy ==
Homburger died in New York in 1965.

In 2012 the Badisches Landesmuseum Karlsruhe restituted the painting "Portrait of an Ancestor" to the descendants of Dr. Paul Philipp Homburger (1882-1965). The painting was seized in July 1939 by the Nazi run Foreign Exchange Office of the Baden Regional Finance Office in Karlsruhe.

The Homburger bank is on the German heritage monuments list.

== See also ==
- Kurt Martin
- Bavarian State Painting Collections
- List of claims for restitution for Nazi-looted art
- Kunsthalle Karlsruhe
- Bankhaus Homberger
