= Zurich West =

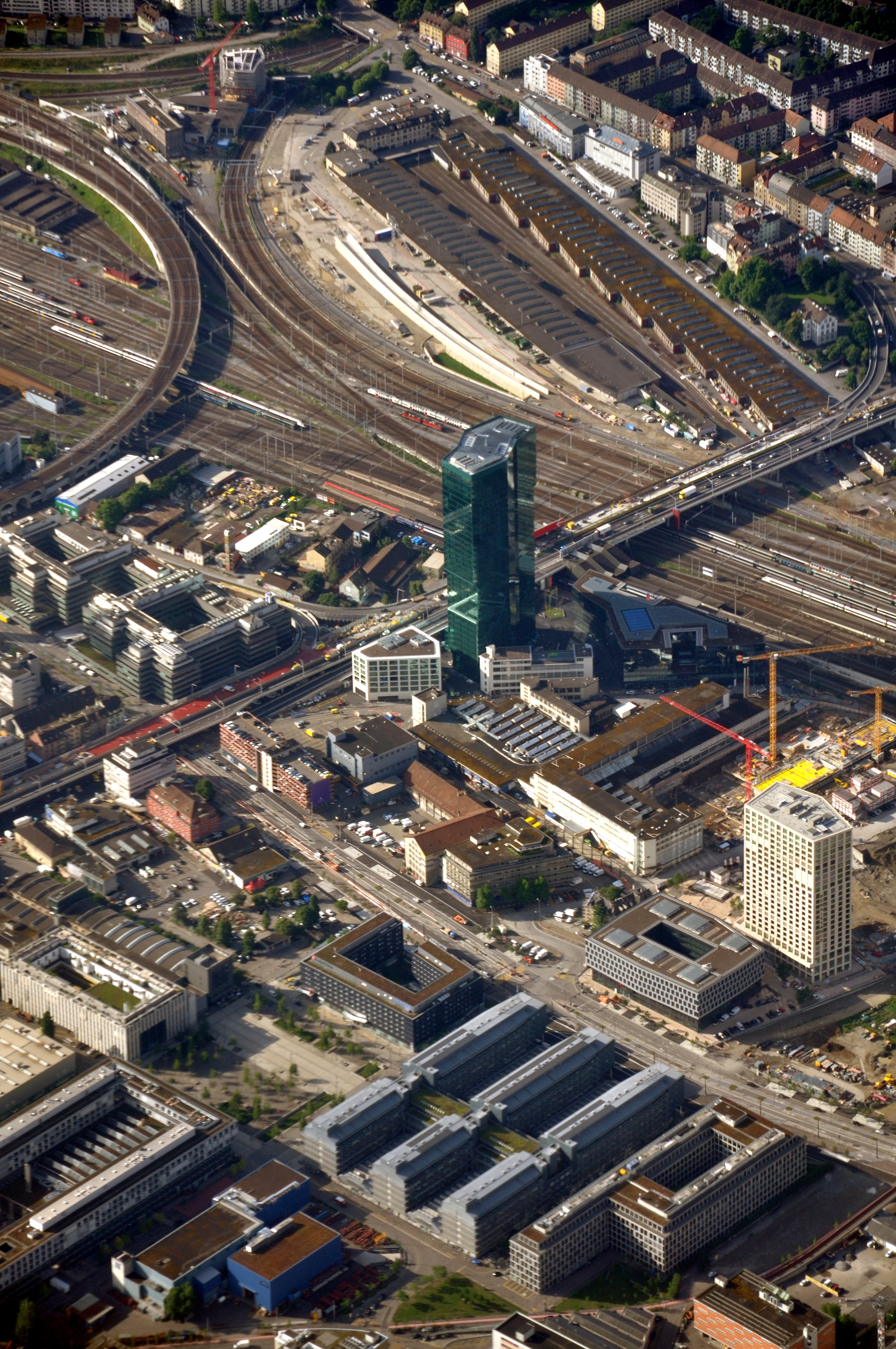
Aerial view

Zürich West (German: Zürich-West) is an area in the Industriequartier, located in the west of Zürich. It is a former industrial site, stretching between the track leading away from Zürich Hauptbahnhof and the Limmat, and experiencing a gradual conversion into a new quarter, including offices, apartments and arts venues.

Zürich West has become the center of economic growth in the Zürich area and is one of eleven central areas of cantonal significance in the canton's structure plan. It includes the Prime Tower as the highest building in Zürich.
