= Duttweiler =

Duttweiler is a Swiss surname. Notable people with this surname include

- Adele Duttweiler (1892–1990), Swiss philanthropist, wife of Gottlieb
- Gottlieb Duttweiler (1888–1962), Swiss businessman and politician, founder of the Migros group
  - Gottlieb Duttweiler Institute
- Werner Duttweiler (born 1939), Swiss athlete
