= Elsa Gasser =

Swiss economist (1896–1967)

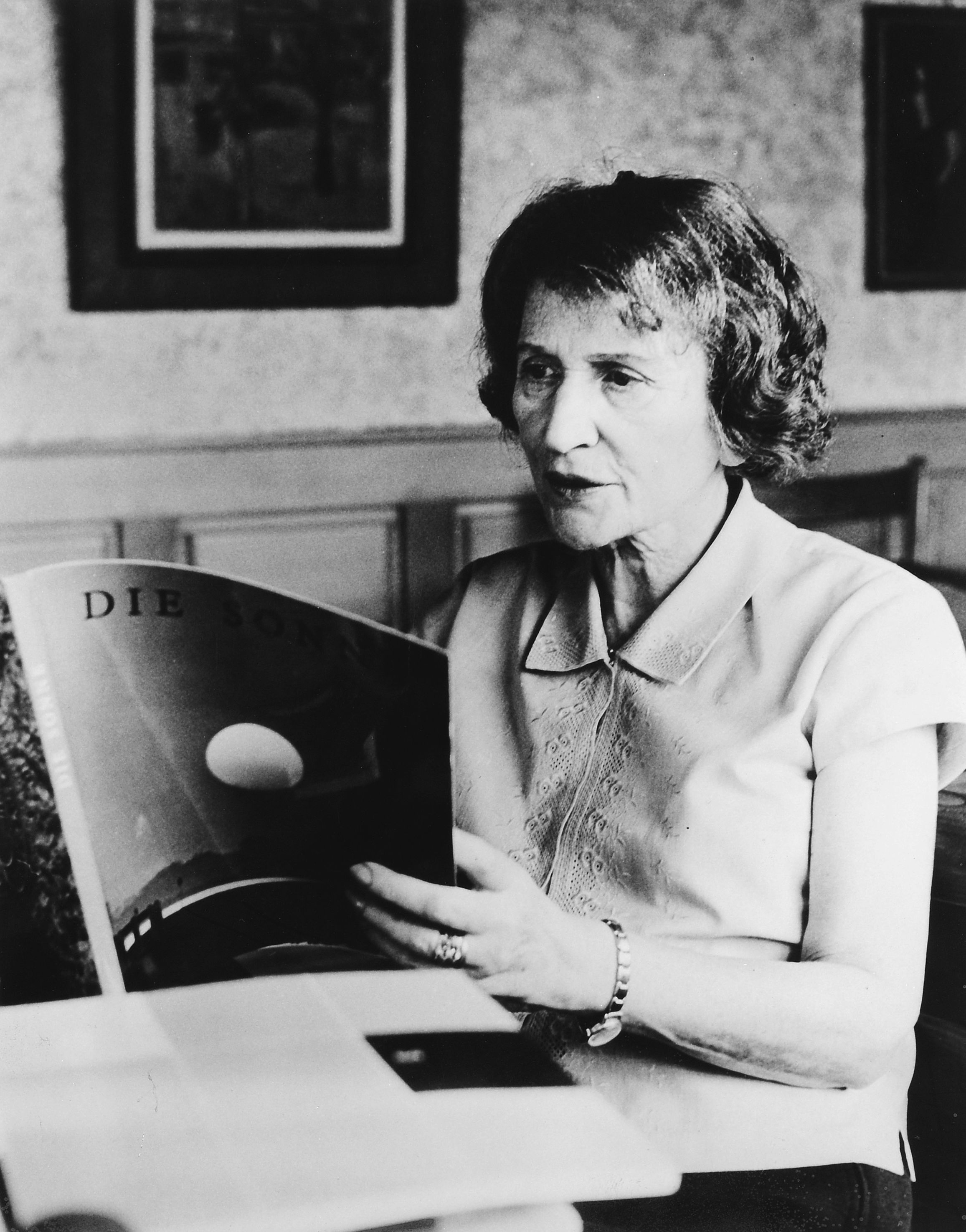
- Born: Elsa Felicya Pfau; 6 June 1896; Kraków, Poland
- Died: 25 August 1967 (aged 71); Zürich
- Occupation: Swiss economist

Elsa Felicya Gasser-Pfau (6 June 1896 – 25 August 1967) was a Polish-born Swiss economist. From the early 1930s, she became an advisor to Gottlieb Duttweiler, the founder of the Migros retail business. In 1948, she convinced him that the firm should introduce a self-service approach, paving the way for Switzerland's most successful supermarket chain. Today Gasser is considered to be responsible for the introduction of supermarkets in Switzerland.

== Early life and education ==
Born in Kraków, Poland, on 6 June 1896, Elsa Felicya Pfau was the daughter of Hersch Ber Pfau. After completing her schooling in Kraków, she moved to Zürich where, after passing the Matura examination in 1915, she studied law and economics at the University of Zurich, earning a doctorate in political science in 1920.

== Career ==
On graduating, Gasser worked at the Zürich Statistics Office and as a business reporter for the Neue Zürchner Zeitung. From 1932, she worked for the Migros retail company where she became the company founder Gottlied Duttweiler's chief advisor and later a member of the company's board.

It was reported that Duttweiler never made an important decision without first consulting Gasser. When in the mid-1940s she first suggested Migros should open a self-service store, he was skeptical but finally agreed. Self-service was introduced in 1946, soon representing two-thirds of the company's sales. Thanks to Gasser, Migros soon became Europe's leading retail company. She is now credited with the introduction of supermarkets into Switzerland.

The Migros company also benefited from Gasser's initiative to integrate the Ex Libris book shop approach to record sales, later contributing to the company's online services. In 1953, she negotiated an exclusive contract for the supply of record players to Ex Libris with Lenco Turntables' co founder Marie Laeng-Stucki. The order for a thousand turntables increased to 50,000 over four years and led to development of a simple, inexpensive record player, marketed at an attractive price under the name Ex Libris Junior.

== Personal life ==
In 1924, Elsa Felicya Pfau married the judge Joseph Beat Gasser.

Elsa Gasser died in Zürich on 25 August 1967.
