= Gottlieb Duttweiler Institute =

Swiss think tank

Coordinates: 47°18′8″N 8°33′8″E

GDI Gottlieb Duttweiler Institute

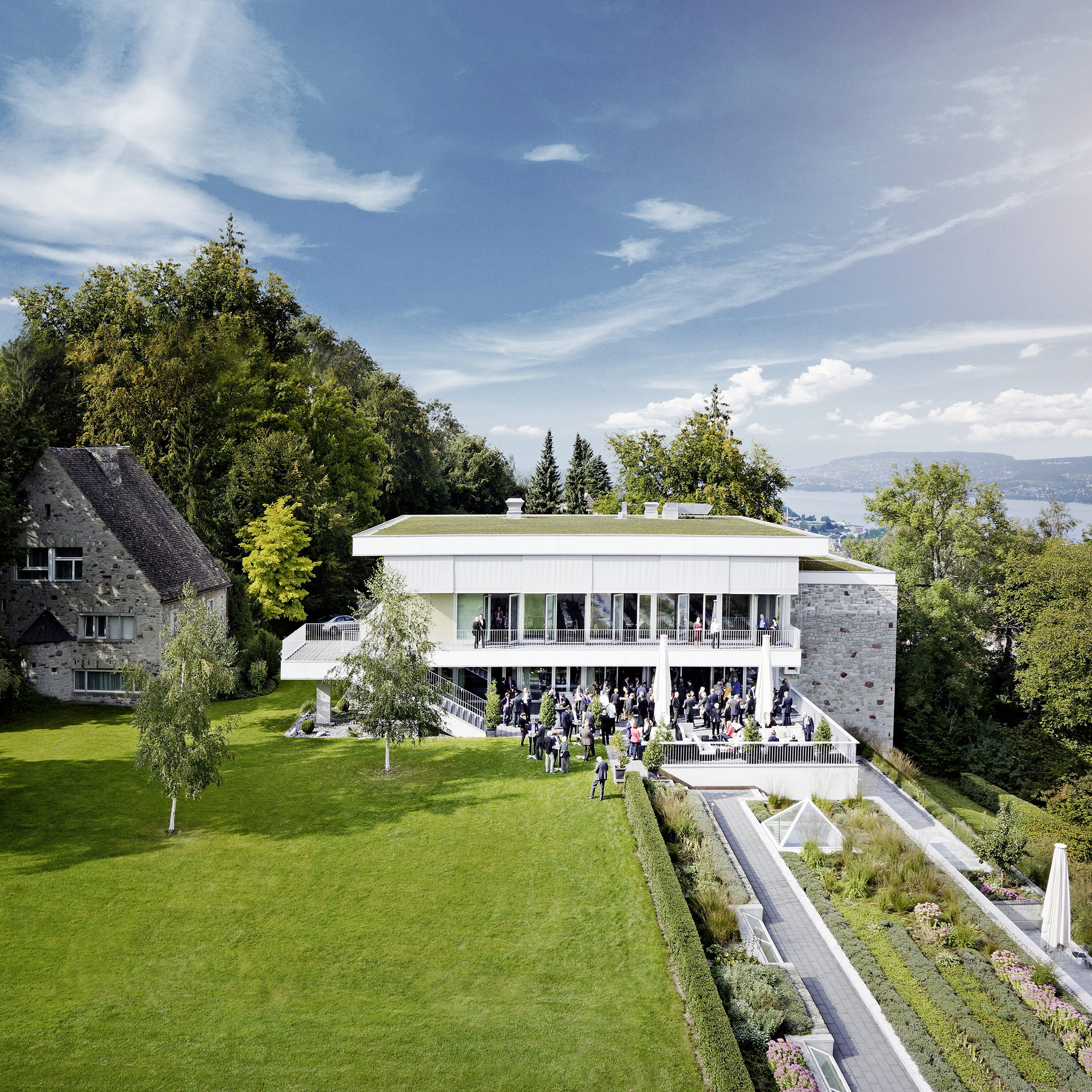
- Gottlieb Duttweile Institute, Rüschlikon, Zurich
- Type: foundation for research for the common wealth
- Purpose: economic and social research, open source, volunteering, urban planning, nutrition, biotechnology, IT
- Website: gdi.ch

The Gottlieb Duttweiler Institute (GDI) is an independent think-tank and the oldest organisation of its kind in Switzerland. It is located in Rüschlikon, near Zurich. The GDI is located on the edge of the Park im Grüene.

Established on 1 September 1963, the research institute was conceived by and named after the founder of Migros, Gottlieb Duttweiler. Taking his principle of "Focus on people and not on capital" as its starting point, the GDI researches and debates issues relating to the fields of consumption, trade and society, and current topics of relevance to business and society. It is owned by the "Im Grüene" Foundation, which is co-financed by Migros, Switzerland's largest retailer. It publishes its research results in numerous studies and conferences and awards the prestigious Gottlieb Duttweiler Prize every few years.

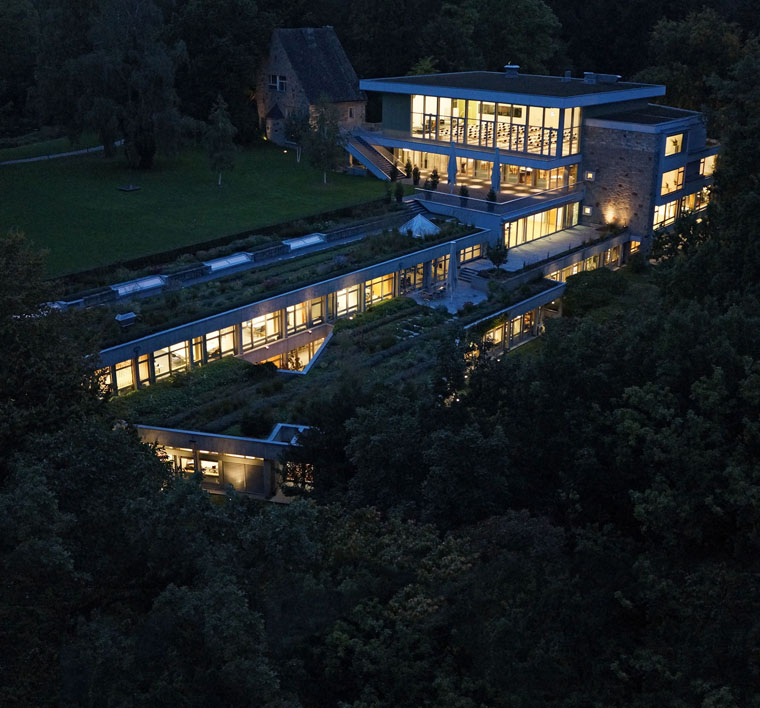
Gottlieb Duttweiler Institute 2015

== Directors ==
- Jennifer Somm (starting 2025, on an interim basis)
- Lukas Jezler (2021–2025)
- David Bosshart (1999–2020)
- Dr. Christian Lutz (1980–1998)
- Dr. Jürg Marx, on an interim basis (1979–1980)
- Hans A. Pestalozzi (1966–1979)
- Hans A. Pestalozzi, on an interim basis (1964–1966)
- Jørgen Thygesen, Virum/Denmark (1963–1964)

== History ==
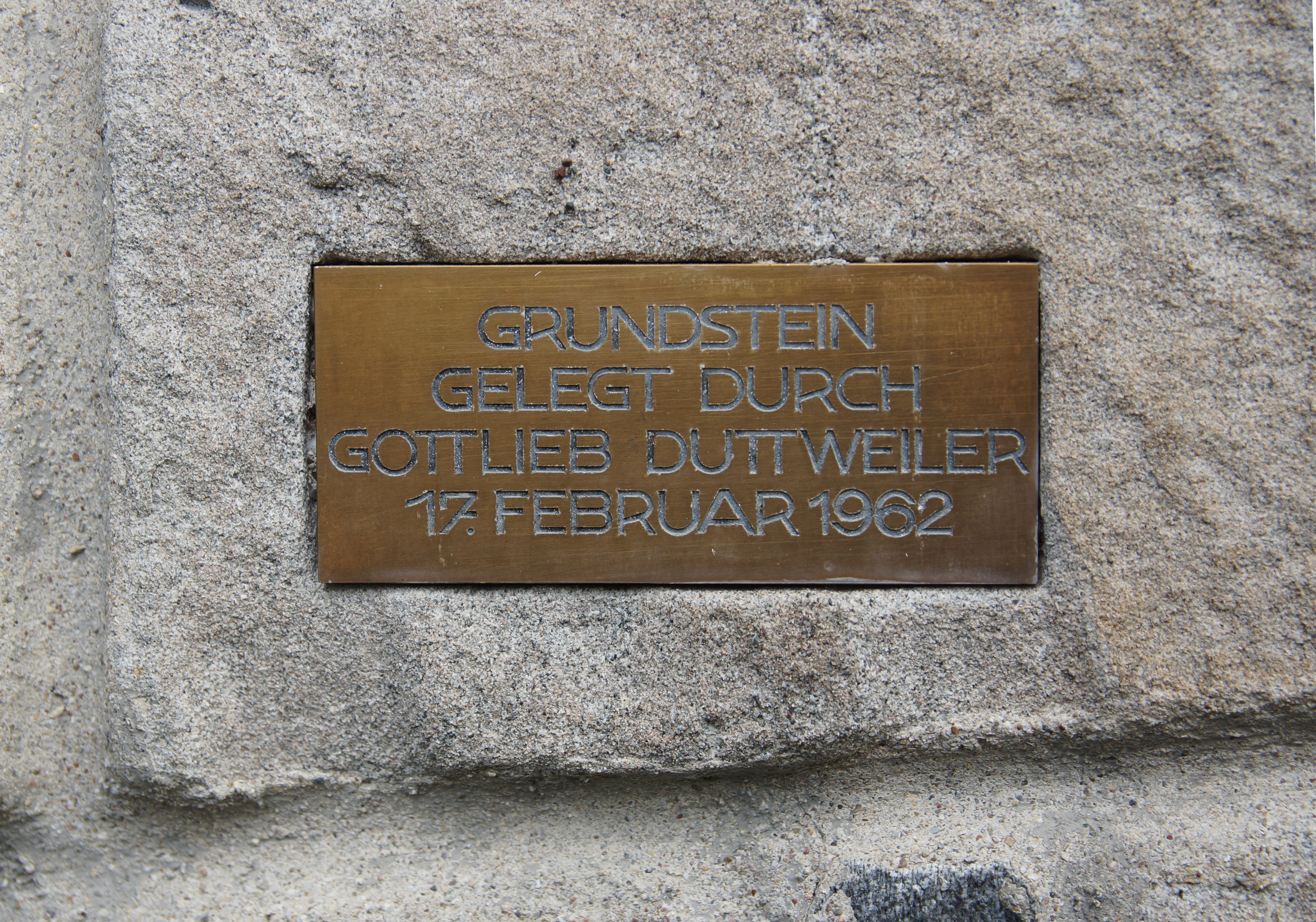
Foundation stone of the Gottlieb Duttweiler Institute

Adele and Gottlieb Duttweiler established the "Im Grüene" Foundation as far back as 1946 with the aim of setting up an institute that could conduct scientific research in the cooperative-society and merchandise-sourcing fields. They wanted to promote events, training courses and meetings that would serve as bridges between people and between nations.

But Gottlieb Duttweiler did not lay the foundation stone for the GDI until 1962, shortly before his death. It was built in the "Im Grüene" Park, the location of the founder's former residence, as an independent research institute for business and social studies. His vision of integrating the economy with society, his enormous inquisitiveness about the future and his thinking on issues of social responsibility have been the basis of the GDI's activities right down to the present day.

== Aims ==
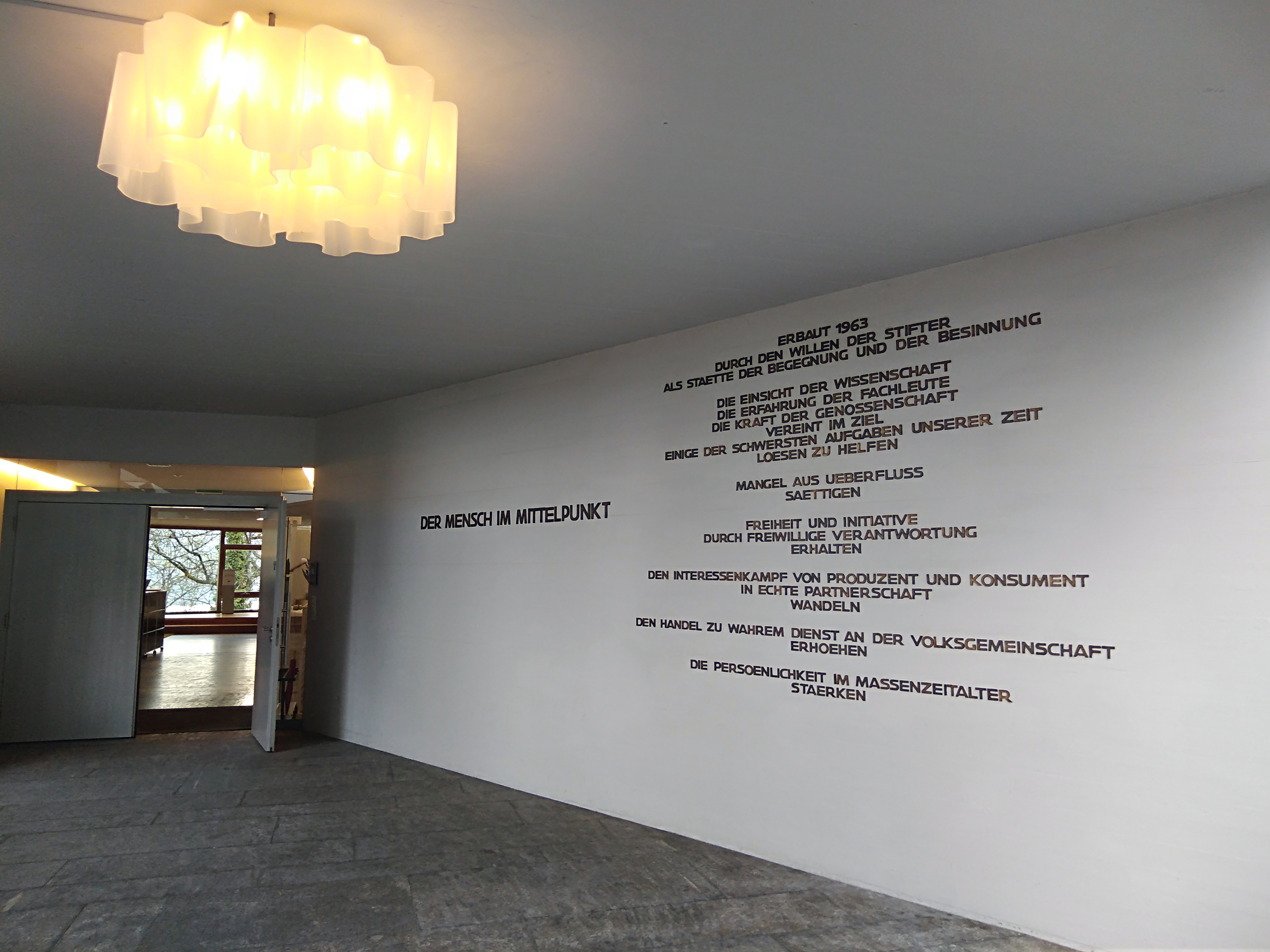
Gottlieb Duttweiler Institute, inscription at the entrance

For almost 40 years, the GDI Gottlieb Duttweiler Institute has carried out independent research. Its goal is to encourage uncommon and unorthodox thinking in order to produce ground-breaking concepts and methods for solving issues. The GDI aims to serve as a gathering spot for innovative ideas and cross-border communication.

Thanks to its networking, the GDI functions as a worldwide knowledge platform for researching and discussing economic and social issues and making the results available to a broader public.

The inscription at the entrance of the institute states the following:

Built 1963 in the spirit of its founders

as a meeting place and a place of reflection the insight of science the experience of professionals the strength of the cooperative unified in the aim of helping to solve some of the hardest challenges of our time

fighting scarcity arising from abundance

gaining freedom and initiative through the voluntary acceptance of responsibility

transforming the conflict of producer and consumer into true partnership

turning trade into a true service to the common good

strengthen the individual in the time of the mass society

— Gottlieb Duttweiler Institute, Inscription at the entrance

== Fields of activity ==
As a meeting place and knowledge hub, the GDI has four main focuses of activity: It is a research centre and innovative think tank, trains executives with leadership programmes, develops innovation strategies with companies and is available as a venue for events.

Experts from business and society meet regularly at the GDI to discuss current trends and future developments. Specialist meetings organised in cooperation with international partners and universities, and evening events dealing with society-related issues, provide further opportunities for exchanging views and experience.

== Topics ==
The Gottlieb Duttweiler Institute focusses its activities on the retail, food and healthcare sectors and examines these from the perspectives of society, technology and the environment.

The GDI has been quick to identify many developments in business and society at an early stage as topics for discussion. As far back as 1964, for instance, it focused on "the introduction of evening opening hours". In 1974, it addressed the subject of organic farming, while "genetic engineering" was a major topic in 1986 and the "Europeanisation of gastronomy" in 2000. In 2005, it produced the "Gold Generation" study, an analysis of the ageing society. The study shows how the values and attitudes of an increasingly aged society change, what kind of lifestyle it cultivates and what makes the "gold generation" happy.

== Conferences ==
The GDI organises regular conferences. They include the "International Retail Summit", the "European Trend Day" and the "International Food Innovation Conference".

== Prize ==
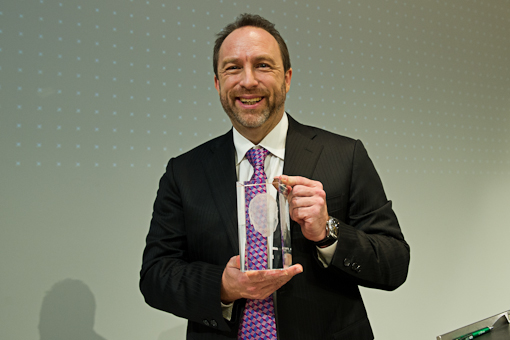
Jimmy Wales at the Gottlieb Duttweiler Awards Show, 2011

The Gottlieb Duttweiler Prize is awarded to extraordinary individuals who have made outstanding contributions to the well-being of the wider community and who are distinguished by courage, persistence, commitment and the successful initiation and implementation of sustainable changes. The Prize is endowed in the amount of 100,000 Swiss Francs. The award-winners include media entrepreneur Roger Schawinski in 1998, German foreign minister Joschka Fischer in 2004 and the former United Nations Secretary-General and winner of the Nobel Peace Prize, Kofi Annan in 2008. The "Switzerland – A Prison" speech that writer Friedrich Dürrenmatt delivered on the occasion of the award of the prize to the then President of Czechoslovakia, Václav Havel, in 1990 aroused great interest. In 2011, the Gottlieb Duttweiler Prize was presented to Wikipedia co-founder Jimmy Wales, and the 2015 award went to World Wide Web inventor Tim Berners-Lee.

=== Awardees ===
- 1970: Fritz Bramstedt, nutritionist, for his "fight" against tooth decay
- 1972: Egon Kodicek, Cambridge, nutritionist
- 1975: Paul Fabri, nutritionist, for his "fight" against obesity
- 1988: Lisbeth and Robert Schläpfer (entrepreneurs), St. Gallen, entrepreneurship in the textile industry
- 1990: Václav Havel, president of Czechoslovakia
- 1993: Esther Afua Ocloo, Ghana, entrepreneur and nutritionist
- 1998: Roger Schawinski, Zurich, Journalist and pioneer in media
- 2004: Joschka Fischer, former foreign minister of Germany
- 2008: Kofi Annan, UN secretary-general, nobel peace prize recipient
- 2011: Jimmy Wales; co-founder of Wikipedia
- 2013: Ernst Fehr, Zurich; scientist
- 2015: Tim Berners-Lee, developer of the world wide web
- 2019: Watson, the computing platform in the field of artificial intelligence developed by IBM
