= Klubschule Migros =

Klubschule
- Switzerland

Information
- Type: Adult education
- Established: 1948
- Founder: Gottlieb Duttweiler, Adele Duttweiler
- Ofsted: Reports
- Staff: ~7,500
- Gender: Mixed
- Website: Official website

Klubschule is a group of adult education programs initiated by Adele and Gottlieb Duttweiler. The literally club school is a brand of the Swiss Migros group which provides courses and programmes at about 50 locations throughout Switzerland.

== History ==
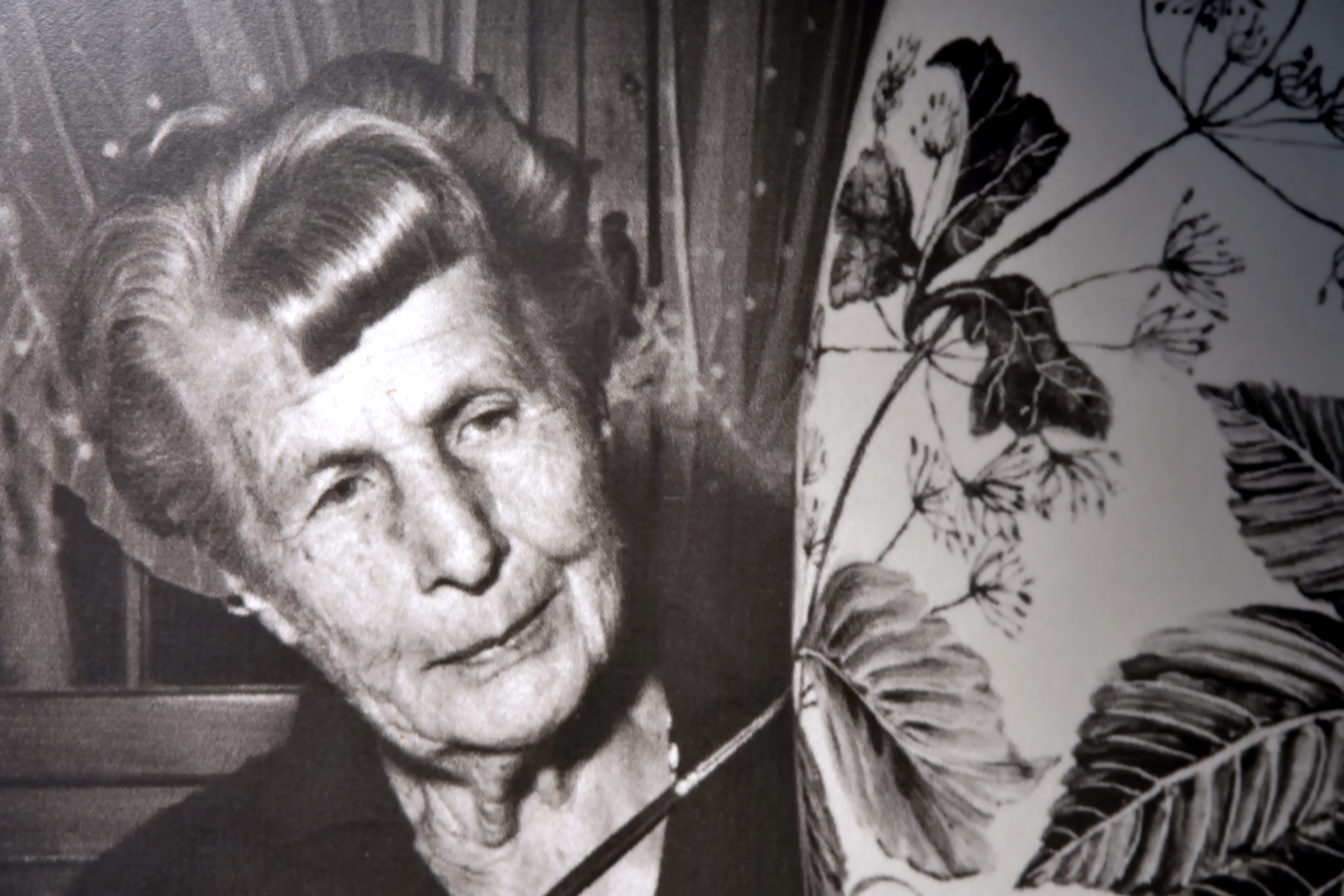
Adele Duttweiler attending a course

Gottlieb Duttweiler and his wife Adele Duttweiler founded the present Migros group, and in 1948 the Migros cooperative started to provide language courses for its members. Today, more than 600 different courses are offered by the Klubschule program, being the largest further education institution in Switzerland. "Providing access to education" for the general public, companies and public services has been an important social and cultural goal.

People attend a course or a training programme at affordable prices that are subsidised through the Migros Kulturprozent system, i.e. by one percent of the turnover of the Migros. As of 2014, Klubschule has a staff of about 1,500 employees and 7,500 course instructors, which held 53,300 courses and programmes that were absolved by 386,700 attendees.

== Courses ==
The program offers courses and training programmes in languages, arts and handicrafts, health and fitness, by about 7,500 course instructors. The range of courses and training programmes is essentially divided into five main areas, namely languages, culture and creativity, exercise and health, management and economics, information technology and new media, and training for trainers. Some of the courses and seminars lead to federally recognized diplomas as the school's programs are eduQua certified.

In 2007 Klubschule became an educational partner in professional training, resulting in nationally and internationally recognised certifications. As of 2008 every fifth student enrolled via the Internet, and therefore an improved website was started in 2009, as well as a cooperation with the ZHdK university in such diverse offerings as animated film and Facebook for beginners, and IT courses focussed on women. Nationwide informatics courses even started in 1984, and a cooperation with Google Switzerland was launched in 2009, as well as the TableTalks of the Klubschule's business-oriented department to meet and talk with personalities from the realms of industry, politics and society.

PodClub is an additional free podcast language service with podcasts in English, French, German, Italian and Spanish, and offer current and authentic productions adapted to the language skill levels of students.
