= Die Schweiz – ein Gefängnis =

Switzerland – A Prison (in German: Die Schweiz – ein Gefängnis) is a speech delivered by Friedrich Dürrenmatt (1921–1990) on November 22, 1990, at the Gottlieb Duttweiler Institute (GDI) on the occasion of awarding the Gottlieb Duttweiler Prize to the Czechoslovak human rights activist Václav Havel (1936–2011). The ironic and provocative speech is considered perhaps his most famous one.

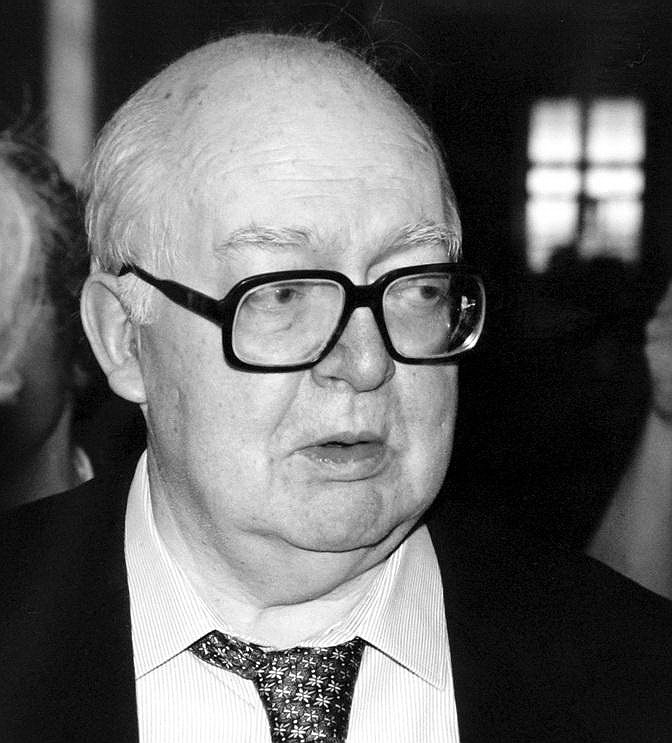
Friedrich Dürrenmatt (1989)

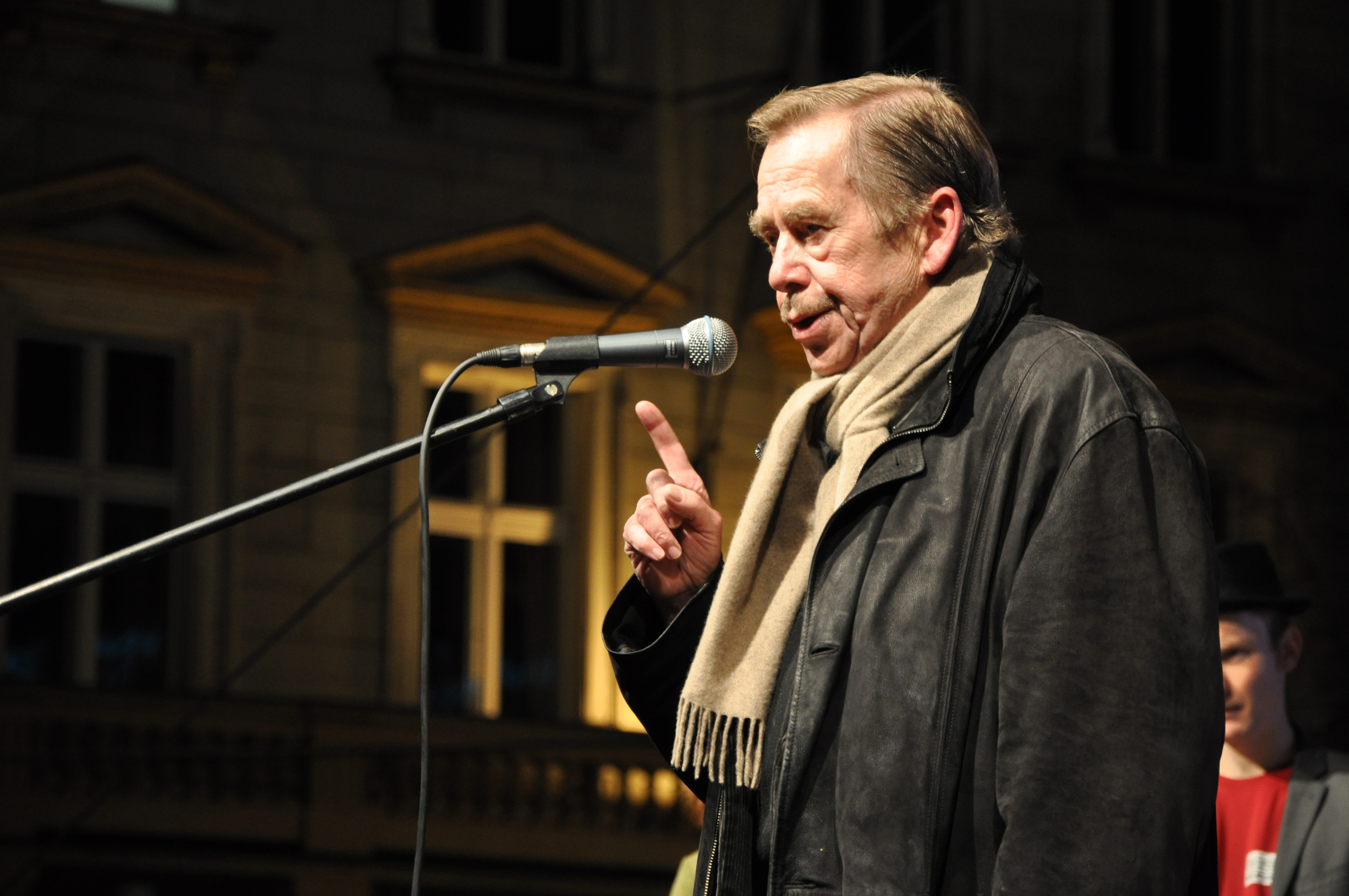
Václav Havel (2009)

== Introduction ==
In his speech, the Swiss German author and dramatist Dürrenmatt combined his tribute to Havel's struggle for freedom with sharp criticism of Switzerland, which he characterized as a “prison,” whose citizens were both guards and inmates. Against the backdrop of the upcoming 700th anniversary of the Bundesbrief (in his words, ‘the alleged prison foundation seven hundred years ago’), he mockingly asked whether Switzerland was celebrating its freedom or its prison and pointed to the country's unresolved role in the Second World War.

The address provoked strong reactions; press reports noted annoyed guests but also admiration for Dürrenmatt's courage. The Süddeutsche Zeitung published the full text of the speech, contributing to the debate in German-speaking countries. The “Prison Speech” is regarded as a highlight of Swiss political literature, a state-critical legacy of the author, and Dürrenmatt's final public appearance. Dürrenmatt died some weeks later (December 14, 1990).

Due to his political statements, Dürrenmatt had been spied on by the Swiss Federal Police during the Secret files scandal for fifty years, a fact he also addressed in his speech on Havel.

In the same year (1990) Dürrenmatt gave also a speech in honour of Mikhail Gorbachev ("Kants Hoffnung/Kant's Hope").

Since this speech, Dürrenmatt's prison metaphor has widely spread. In a presentation introducing a 2023 European debate between GLP politician Nicola Forster and former Federal Councillor Christoph Blocher (SVP) for example, the young Swiss politician and activist Sanija Ameti accused the latter—referring to Dürrenmatt's prison metaphor—of sparing neither a franc nor any distortion of facts in order to [...] freeze the country in 'prison mode'.

== See also ==
- 700th anniversary of the Old Swiss Confederacy (in German)

== Literature ==
- Friedrich Dürrenmatt: Die Schweiz – ein Gefängnis. Rede auf Václav Havel, mit einem Gespräch des Autors mit Michael Haller sowie einer Rede von Adolf Ogi, Diogenes-Taschenbuch 22 952, Zürich 1997, ISBN 3-257-22952-6.
