= Marie Laeng-Stucki =

Swiss entrepreneur in the sound industry

- Born: Marie Stucki; 30 July 1905; Signau, Switzerland
- Died: 27 August 1974 (aged 69)
- Occupation(s): Entrepreneur in the sound industry, founder of Lenco Turntables
- Spouse: Fritz Laeng

Marie Laeng-Stucki (née Stucki) (30 July 1905 – 27 August 1974) was a Swiss entrepreneur in the sound industry. With her husband Fritz Laeng, she founded Lenco Turntables, a factory specialising in vinyl turntables and injection-moulded parts. The company played a significant role in shaping the Swiss music industry between 1945 and 1974.

== Early life ==
Marie Stucki was born on 30 July 1905 in Signau, in the Canton of Bern, Switzerland. She never knew her father as he died before she was born. Her mother died when she was only 7 years old. The young Marie was separated from her brother and placed in a children's home, where she was subjected to violence and abuse but managed to complete her primary education. After she completed her compulsory education, she left Switzerland for Italy, where she worked as a cleaner and a secretary in hotels in Florence and Naples. Age 22, she returned to Switzerland and worked at l'Hotelwachter in Berne.

== Career ==
In Switzerland she met electrician and photographer Fritz Laeng, who was running a small radio shop in Burgdorf, north-east of Bern. They married in 1929. Their shared passion for radio technology and record players led to them becoming business partners as well. She played an essential part in the development of and success of the company, and was particularly involved in managing the shop and workshop. During the Second World War, Fritz Laeng was conscripted into the Swiss army and Marie Laneg-Stucki ran the business on her own.

In 1946, Marie Laeng-Stucki, her husband Fritz and radio technician Bruno Grütter founded Lenco AG Burgdorf, a record player and injection moulding factory that made record players. Grütter and some employees lived and ate in the Laeng family home. The name Lenco was dreamt up by Laeng-Stucki, using elements of her family's name. She had wanted to use the name Lanco, but the Swiss watch brand LANCO had been in existence since 1873. Early newspaper advertisements used the name Lenco and giving the company's address before the formal formation of Lenco AG.

Laeng-Stucki encouraged the development of a series of record player models and built new business partnerships for product distribution. In 1953, she negotiated an exclusive contract to supply record players to the Migros subsidiary and book division Ex Libris with its then director, Elsa Gasser. A thousand turntables were initially planned, which increased to 50,000 delivered over four years. From 1955 onwards, under Laeng-Stucki's direction, Lenco developed a simple, inexpensive record player, marketed at an attractive price under the name Ex Libris Junior, which secured the company's future. Marie Laeng-Stucki instignated the construction of the company's production sites in Steg (Valais) in Switzerland and Osimo in Italy.

Throughout her life, Marie Laeng-Stucki worked to promote social progress both inside and outside her company. She founded an institution to support disadvantaged children. At the head of a multinational company with over 1,300 employees, she became one of the "most powerful female entrepreneurs in Switzerland". She was often referred to as Mama Laeng. Lengo AG was a progressive organisation, with staff benefits including a pension scheme, company sports teams and events, a library, cashless salary payments, flexible working hours and systematic accident prevention procedures.

== Personal life ==
Marie Stucki married Fritz Laeng in 1929 and was known as Marie Laeng-Stucki after her marriage. The couple had four children, two of whom died at birth. Sons Rudolph and Fritz junior both went into the family business.

She worked in the company she ran with her husband until her death. Marie Laeng-Stucki died on 27 August 1974 in Geneva.

== Commemoration ==
L'Institut pour l'industrie et l'économie d'Osimo in Italy was renamed Instituto Maria Laeng in her honour in 2010. Laeng-Stucki was featured in an exhibition Women of Action (Macherinnen) at the Schloss Burgdorf in 2022.

To commemorate the 50th anniversary of her death, the Museum of Schloss Burgdorf is publishing a Schlossschrift on Marie Laeng, Lenco AG and its employees, produced in collaboration with the Burgdorf Biographical Institute and former Lenco employees.
