= Goldring (audio company) =

Audio Equipment Manufacturing Company

Goldring is an audio equipment manufacturing company that was established in 1906. In 1906, the Scharf brothers started manufacturing phonographs in Berlin, Germany. The company moved to Britain in 1933 and continued manufacturing cartridges and turntables. The Juwel Electro Soundbox phonograph was its own creation and was released in 1926. The Goldring logo was as indication of quality.

In 1954 the company released the Goldring 500 magnetic cartridge. This was British-made.

Goldring cartridges have been sold in the US since the 1950s and are sold all over the world. They range from budget to high-end. The company also sold Swiss-made Lenco turntables in the 1970s. For example, the Lenco L75 was marketed via Goldring as a GL75.

The Scharf brothers changed their name to Sharp and continued their family business until 1987. At this time, Gerry Sharp sold the company to the Goldring distributor Veda-UK (which is now part of Armour Home).

Even though Goldring was mainly known for its moving coil cartridges and moving magnet cartridges, turntables, etc., it also manufactured later sound cones and headphones.

== Current moving magnet cartridges ==
- 1006
- 1012GX
- 1022GX
- 1024
- E1
- E2
- E3

== Current moving iron cartridges ==
- 2100
- 2200
- 2300
- 2400
- 2500

== Current moving coil cartridges ==
- Eroica H
- Eroica LX
- Elite
- Legacy
- Ethos

== Current headphones ==
- DR50
- DR100
- DR150
- GX100
- GX200
- NS1000

== Goldring timeline ==
In 1906, the Scharf brothers began manufacturing in Berlin, Germany, and released their own phonograph, the Juwel Electro Soundbox, which had a Gold Ring logo to denote quality, in 1926. Goldring moved to Britain in 1933. In 1954, the company released 500 British-made magnetic cartridges; the 600 and 700 models followed in 1958 and 1960, respectively. The 1970s saw the release of the Lenco GL85 turntable (1973) and of the 900SE II and 900/E cartridges. In 1987, Goldring was sold to Veda-UK (Armour Home Electronics). Between 1987 and 1990, four more cartridges—Eroica, Epic II, Excel, and Elite—were released. In 2004, the Goldring released its digital GR1 turntable, followed by the GR2 turntable in 2005. In 2006, the company launched its critically acclaimed DR50, DR100, and DR150 headphones.

== See also ==
- List of phonograph manufacturers
- Armour Home Electronics
