= Park im Grüene =

Amusement park in Rüschlikon, Switzerland

- Interactive map of Park im Grüene
- Location: Alsenstrasse 40; Rüschlikon, Canton of Zürich, Switzerland CH-8303
- Coordinates: 47°18′4″N 8°33′7″E
- Status: Operating
- Opened: 1947
- Owner: Migros Genossenschaftsbund
- Operating season: Year round
- Area: 4.5 ha (11 acres)

Attractions
- Water rides: 1
- Other rides: 5
- Website: Official website

Park im Grüene is a public park and a small amusement park in the municipality of Rüschlikon in Switzerland. The park area comprises the former estate of Adele and Gottlieb Duttweiler that went to public use in 1947.

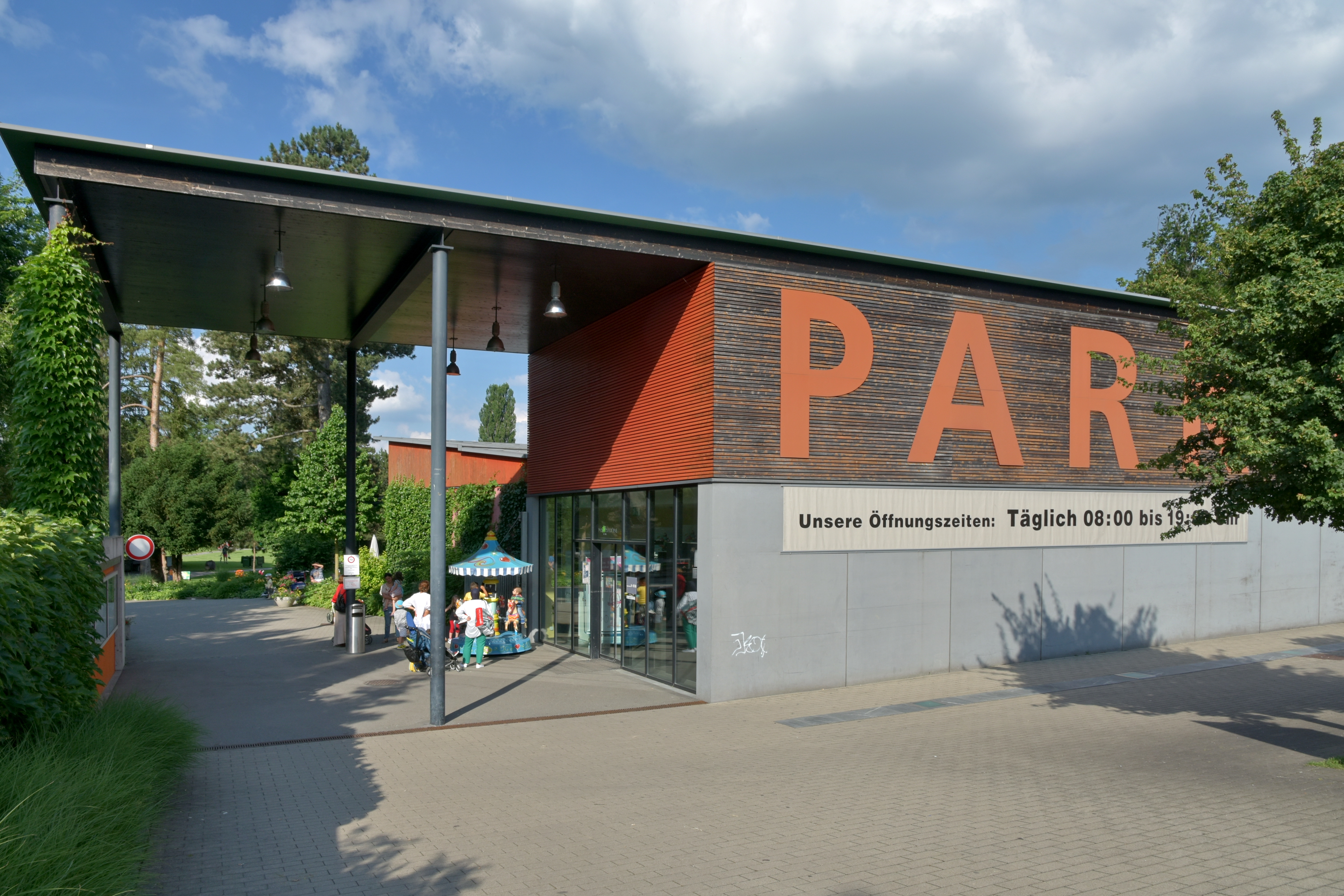
Main entrance

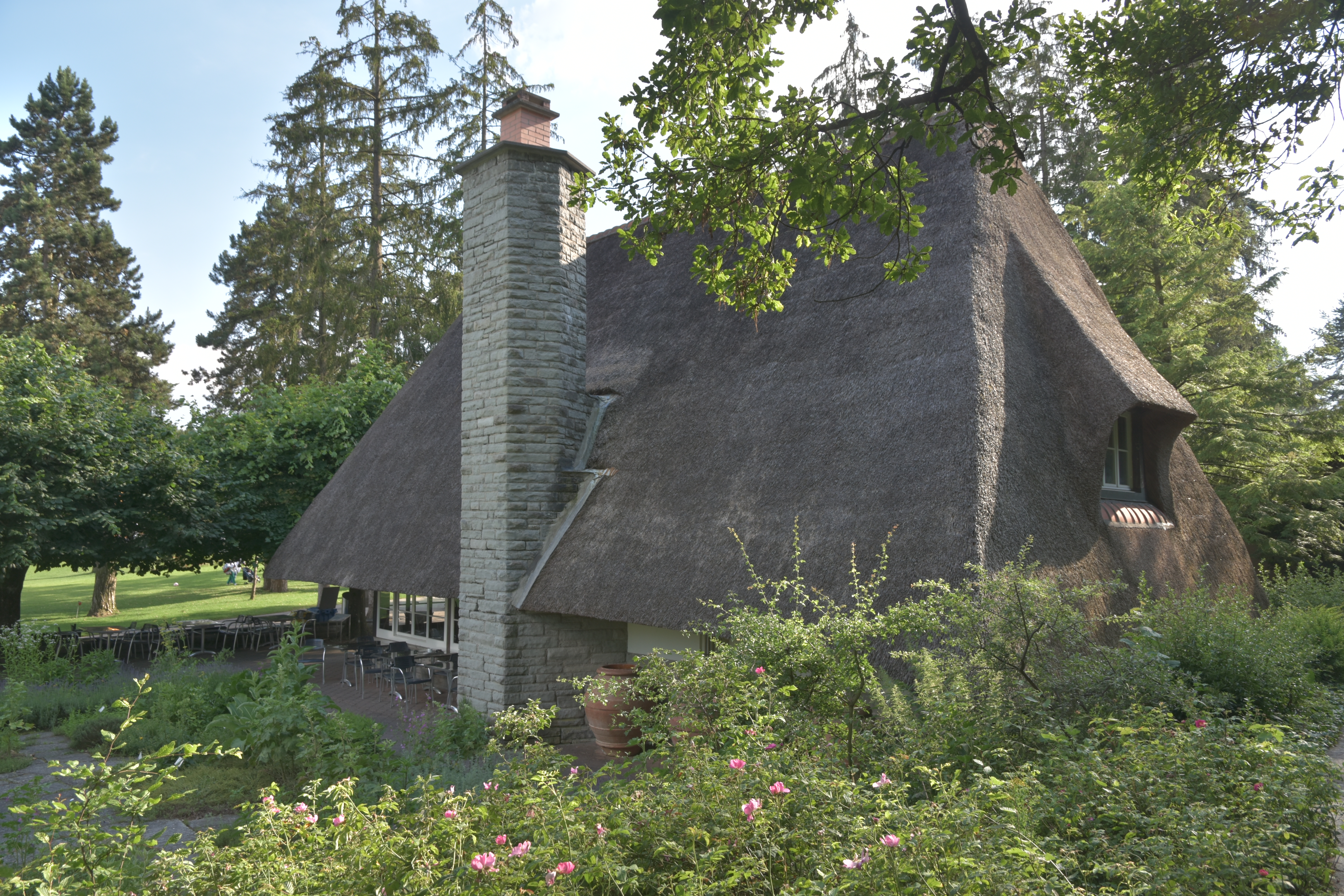
Strohhaus exhibition hall

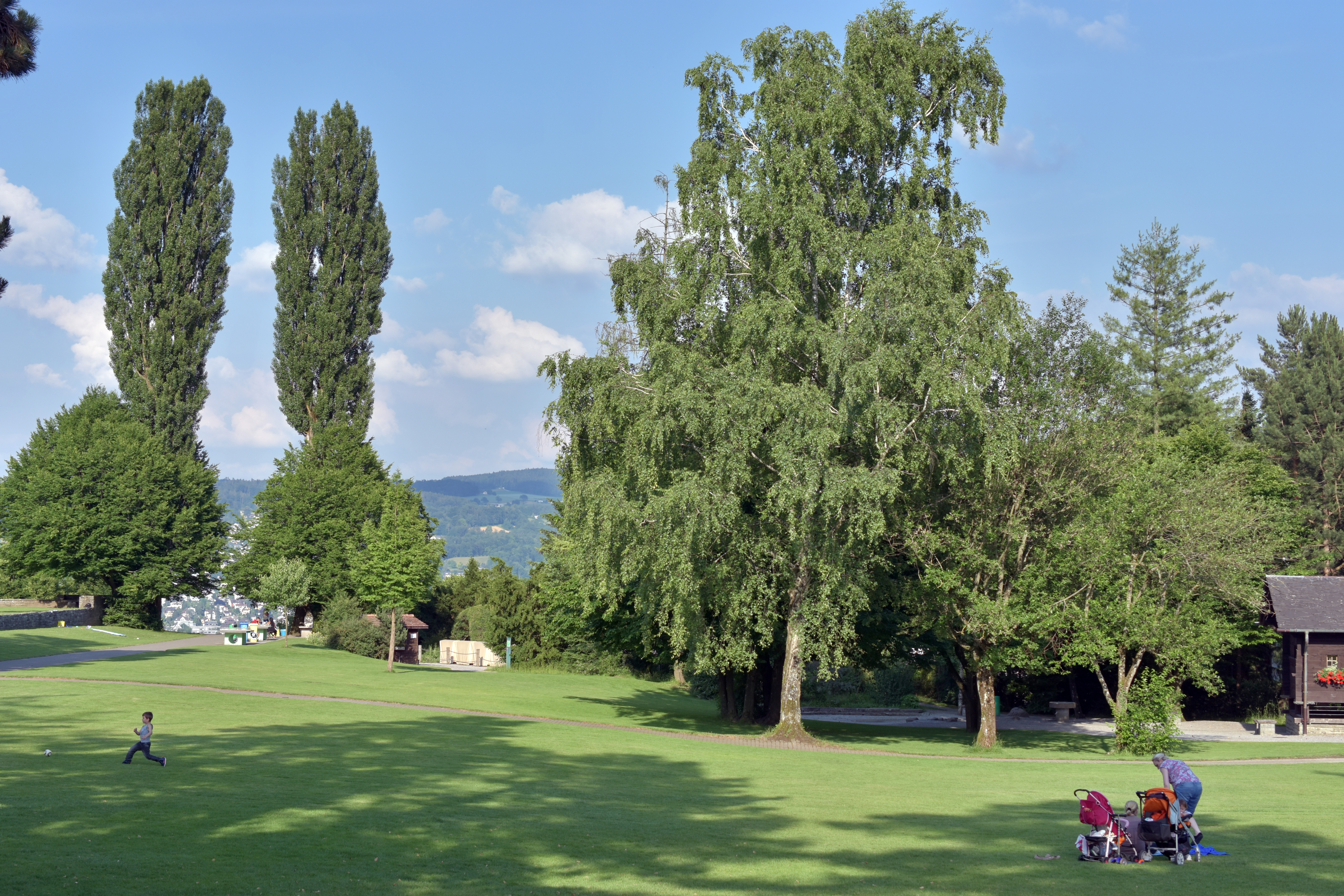
Arboretum

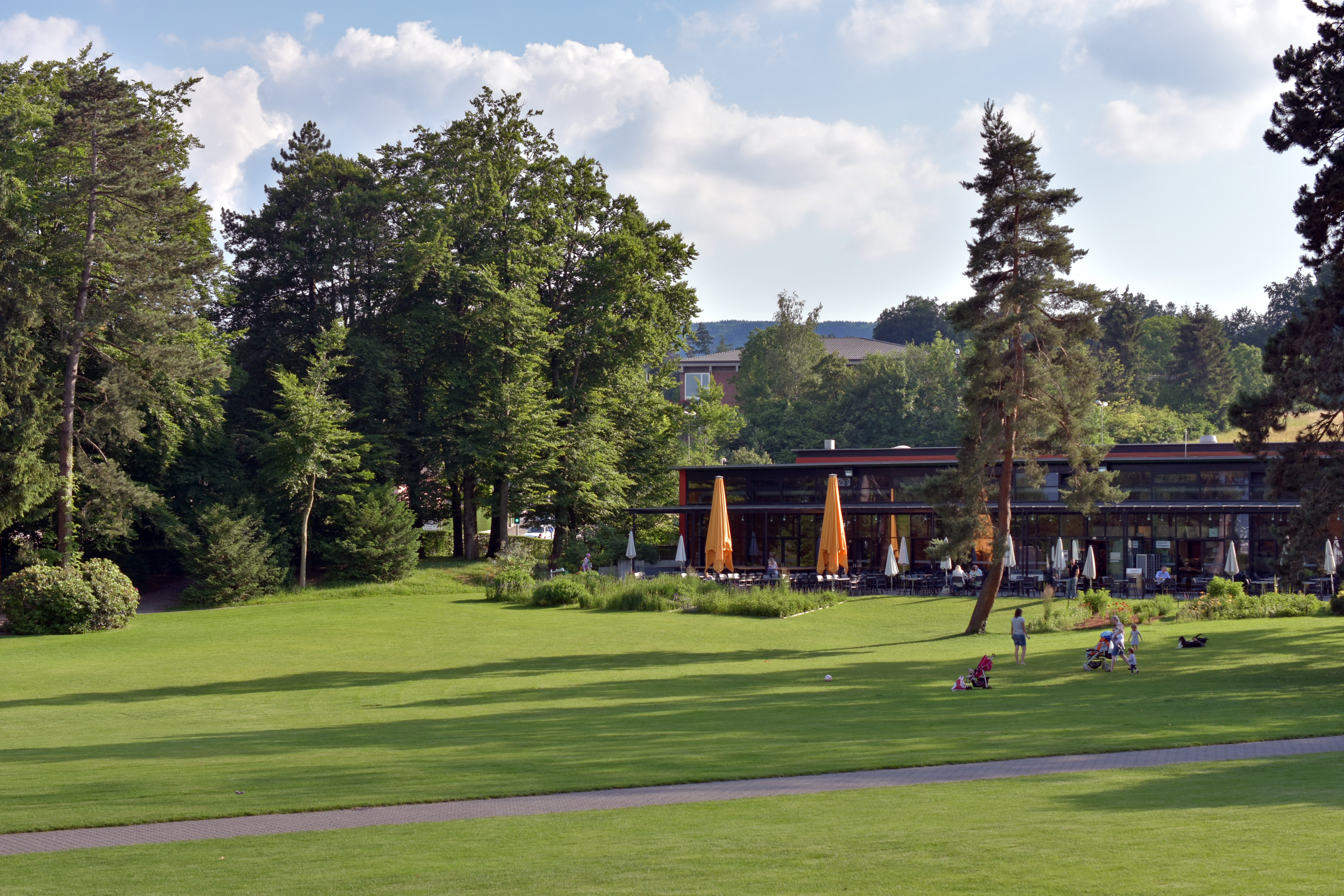
Restaurant

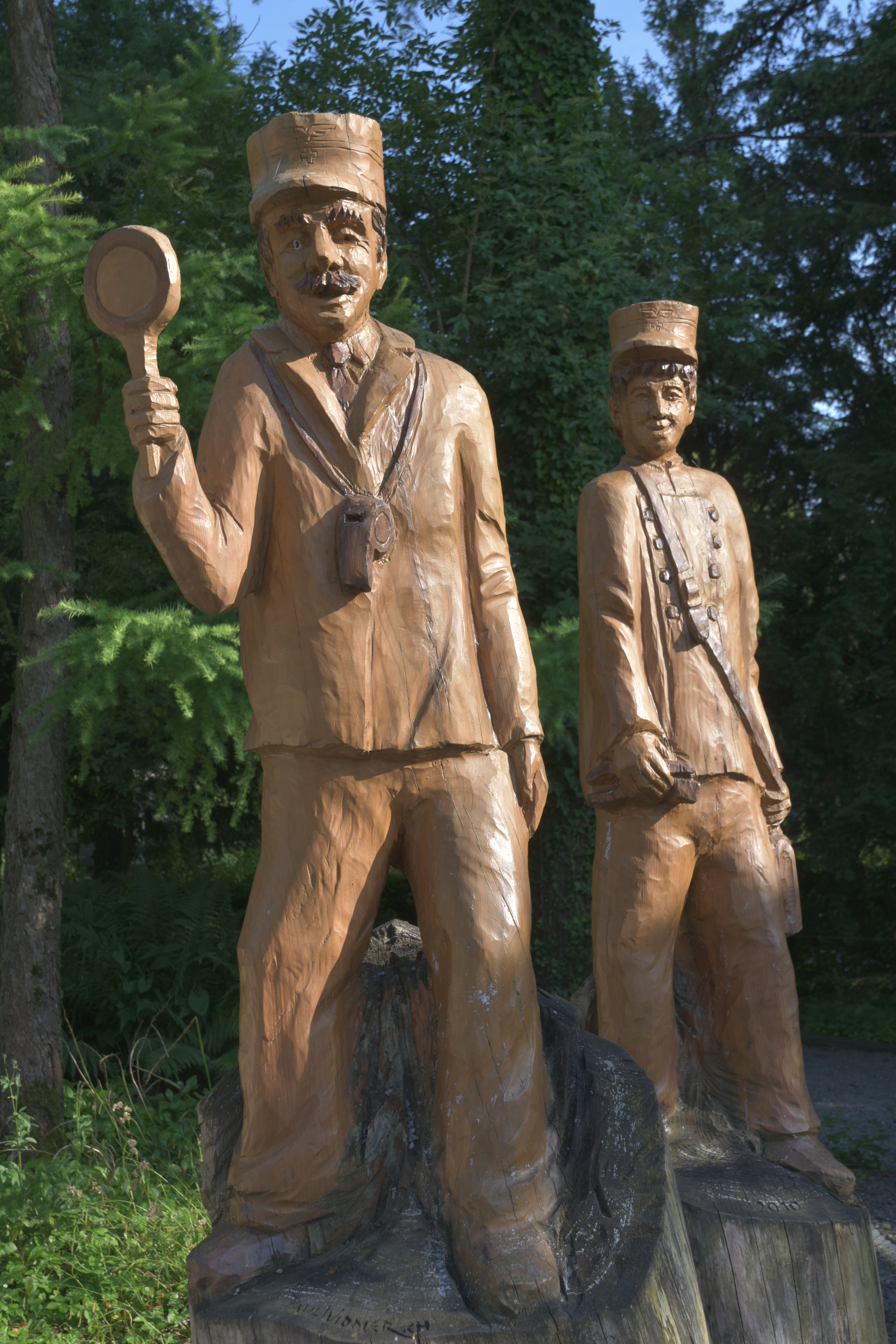
Sculptures at the 'Toy train' terminus

== Location ==
The park area is situated in the municipality of Rüschlikon on the northern Zimmerberg plateau in the Canton of Zürich overlooking Zürichsee and the Sihl Valley. Public transport is provided by the VBZ bus line 165 from Bürkliplatz Zürich and Arboretum Zürich towards Belvoir stop, and by the S-Bahn Zürich line S8 to the Rüschlikon railway station.

== Name ==
The park's Swiss German name literally means Park in the green, but commonly used is Dutti-Park, the popular nickname of Gottlieb Duttweiler.

== History ==
The park area comprises the former estate of Adele and Gottlieb Duttweiler, who gave over the spacious area of their estate to the public use in 1946/47 – hence the admission is free, according to Duttweiler's social understanding. The Gottlieb Duttweiler Institute (GDI) is also part of the «Im Grüene» foundation. It was created on 24 December 1946 Adele and Gottlieb Duttweiler. The foundation's assets include the 4.5 hectares (11 acres) Langhalden estate and an endowment. At the time the foundation was established, the donation had a total value of 520,000 Swiss francs, which after adjusting for inflation is equal to about 2.6 million Swiss Francs today. The Foundation was tasked to make the Langhalden estate available to the general public as a place of recreation. The donor's intentions were realised by turning the estate into the «Im Grüene» Park (known locally as «Dutti-Park»). The GDI is located on the edge of the park.

The construction works for the park area and of the so-called Strohhaus building started in 1933 as the private estate of the Duttweiler Institute. It was used as an economic building and later as a clubhouse, burnt down in 1961 and was rebuilt by the S+M architecture company in the same year. On 8 June 1962 Gottlieb Duttweiler died, and a permanent Dutti exhibition at the popular straw house (German: Strohhaus') was established. Beginning in 1972, the Strohhaus building was also used as cultural centre, for other exhibitions and also as a music hall.

In 2000/1 the park area was expanded, a Migros restaurant was built at the entrance area, a Kasperli theater for children and a donkey ride were established, as well as a parking facility added. In 2001 the Strohhaus building became a memorial monument and was rebuilt to house a permanent exhibition in memory of Adele and Gottlieb Duttweiler.

== Points of interest ==
The park also houses a popular restaurant, a bath and the Duttweiler museum. The large lawns and the vast children's playground also attracts during the summer months puppet shows, donkey rides, a toy train and a water feature. In the summer months, various cultural events are held.

== Literature ==
- Gartenbiografien: Orte erzählen. vdf Hochschulverlag AG, ETH Zürich, Zürich 2013, ISBN 978-3-7281-3579-7.
