= Ex Libris (bookshop) =

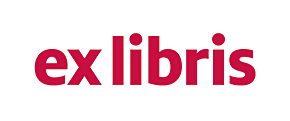
- Industry: Retail
- Founded: 1949
- Founder: Gottlieb Duttweiler
- Headquarters: Dietikon, canton of Zürich, Switzerland
- Number of locations: 78 as of January 2016, 84 as per 2014
- Area served: Switzerland
- Products: books, music, films, video games and electronic equipment
- Services: stores, telephone orders and online distribution via internet and mobilephone apps
- Revenue: CHF 121 Mio (as of January 2016)
- Owner: Migros
- Number of employees: 364 as of January 2016, 387 as of January 2014
- Parent: Migros
- Website: Official website (in German and French)

Ex Libris is a Swiss retail company in the media sector which operates 82 department stores in Switzerland. The group is owned by Migros which is Switzerland's largest retailer and claims to provide the largest online shop of Switzerland.

== History ==
Gottlieb Duttweiler and his wife Adele Duttweiler founded the present Migros group, and in 1949 Duttweiler shared with the former "Buchclub Ex Libris", which was integrated in the Migros group in 1956. Ex Libris provided licensed editions of the most important German-language publishers, including literature in the fields of art, history, sociology and children's literature at low prices. The adoption of a risk part facilitated the publication of works by young Swiss authors, and so the "ch" edition was started to promote cultural exchanges between the four Swiss language regions. From 1979 to 1983 the series "Frühling der Gegenwart" (Spring of the present) was published. It consisted of new editions of Swiss novels and short stories from 1890 to 1950 in 30 volumes. In 1952 Ex Libris began to sell music on vinyl; the original records were imported from England, France and USA, and were put in cases whose covers were designed by Swiss graphic designers. Initially, the edition comprised only Classical music, and later selected dance music, jazz and pop. Around 1990, the last stocks were sold out in the Ex Libris stores.

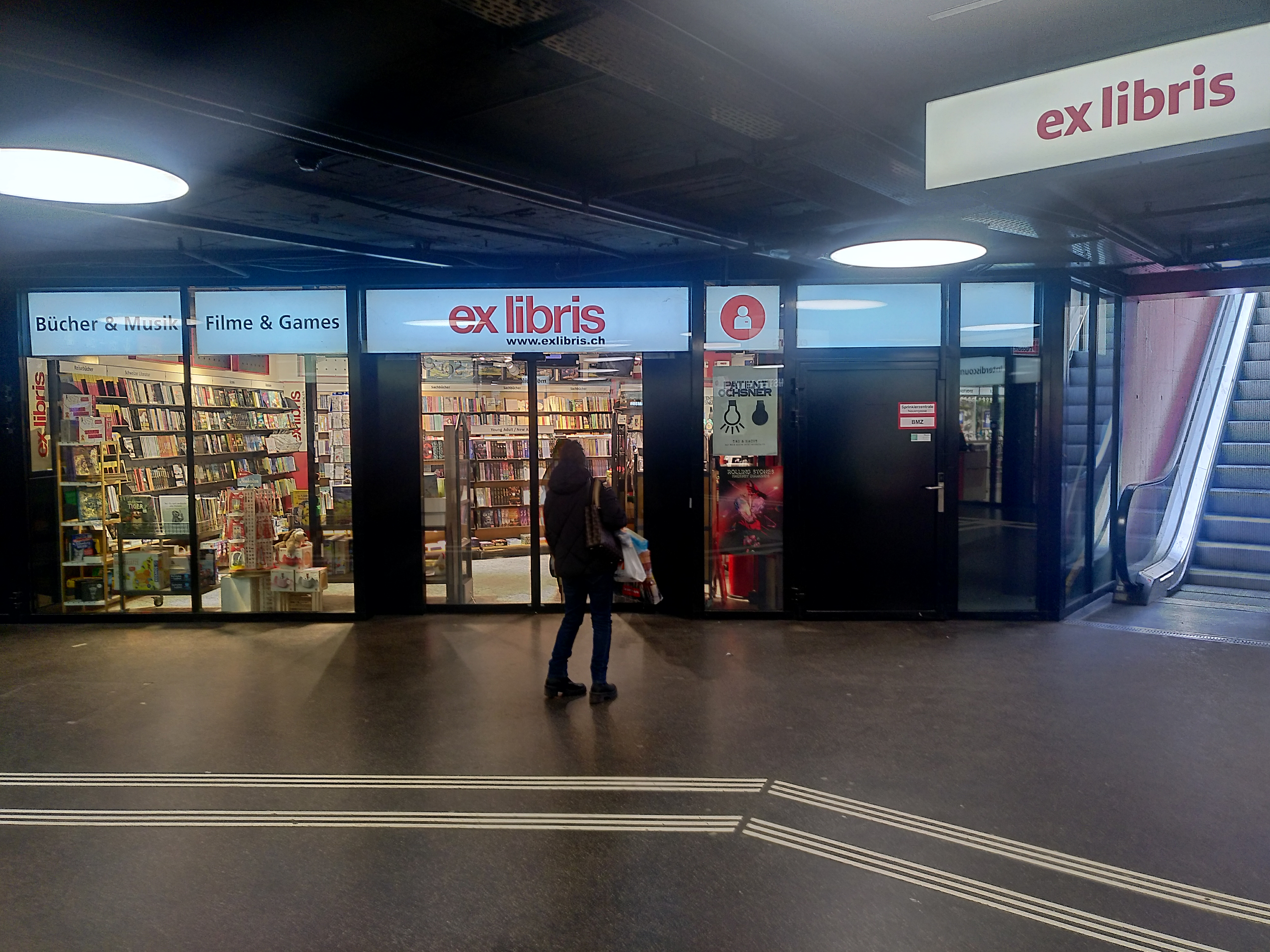
One of the last ex libris shops, Bern 2026

On 10 January 2018 ex libris announced to reduce its stores to only 14 (by 2017 57) stores, and the number of employees would also be reduced by 114 full-time equivalents: The structural change in the trading market was also reflected in Ex Libris' annual results for 2017. Online revenues rose +8% and reached a new record level. On the other hand, they were not able to compensate for the losses in the stationery business, which had fallen by a third in terms of sales and like-for-like sales in the past three years. The Migros subsidiary was therefore forced to adjust its branch structure.

== Sortiment ==
In the present days, Ex Libris offers also films on DVD and Blu-ray, as well as licensed downloads of books and music, in its stores in Switzerland and by its online webshop. Ex Libris claims to be the largest Swiss online shop for books, music, movies, games, and electronics, and features a network in the German-speaking area of Switzerland. In the online shop, the Migros subsidiary provides a multimedia full range of more than 6 million products, plus more than 10 million digital products for download. Each month, more than one million customers use the online shop via the mobilephone app. Furthermore, Ex Libris offers Video on Demand since 2015.
