= Lenco Turntables =

Dutch manufacturer

Lenco Benelux BV
- Founded: 1946; 80 years ago
- Founder: Fritz and Marie Laeng
- Headquarters: Kerkrade, Limburg Netherlands
- Area served: Worldwide
- Key people: Bert Peels (CEO)
- Number of employees: c.a. 100 (2018)
- Website: Lenco.com

Lenco is a brand of audio and video equipment, originally used by the Swiss turntable manufacturer Lenco AG from the 1940s until the 1980s. The name is now owned by Dutch concern Commaxx International NV.

== The Swiss company ==
Lenco AG was founded in 1946 in Burgdorf, Switzerland by married couple Fritz Laeng and Marie Laeng-Stucki, with Bruno Grütter. In 1925 Fritz had set up and run Radio Laeng, a shop selling and renting radios in complete and kit form. The name Lenco was derived from their surname.

The firm initially produced a range of household products moulded in plastic and aluminium before launching its first turntable in 1949 to take advantage of the, then new, LP record format introduced by Columbia Records.

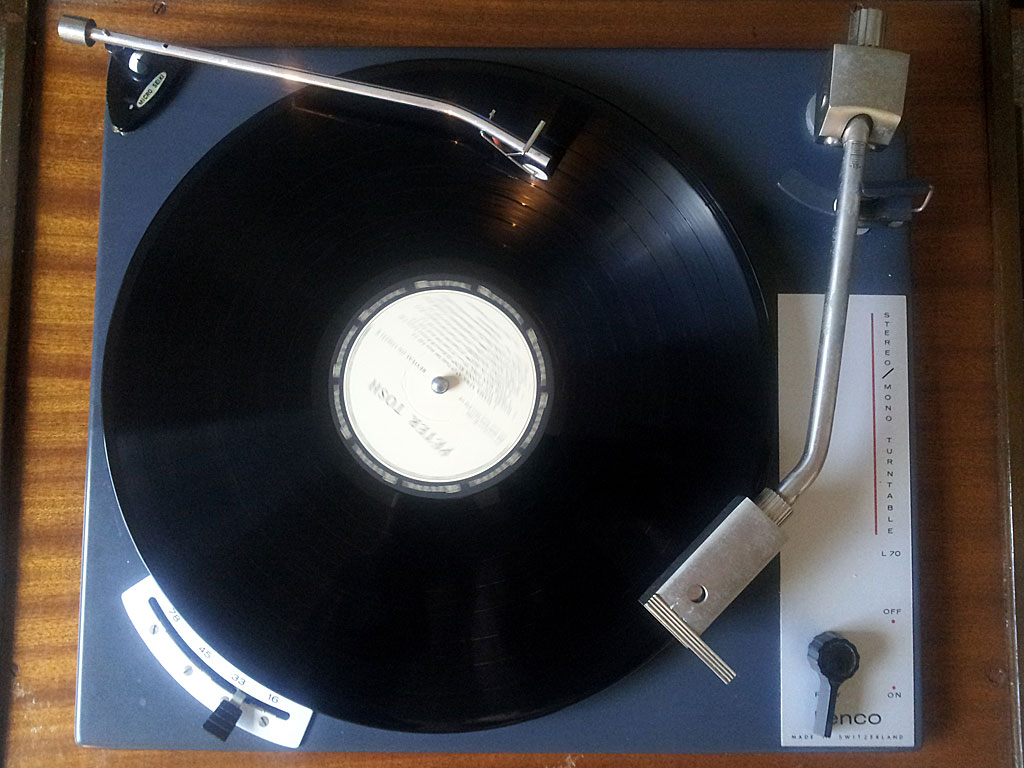
Lenco L70 turntable, produced 1958-1967

From the mid-1950s, Lenco supplied turntables for sale in other countries, initially under the name of a local commercial partner, including Bogen in the United States and Goldring in the United Kingdom, later under its own name.

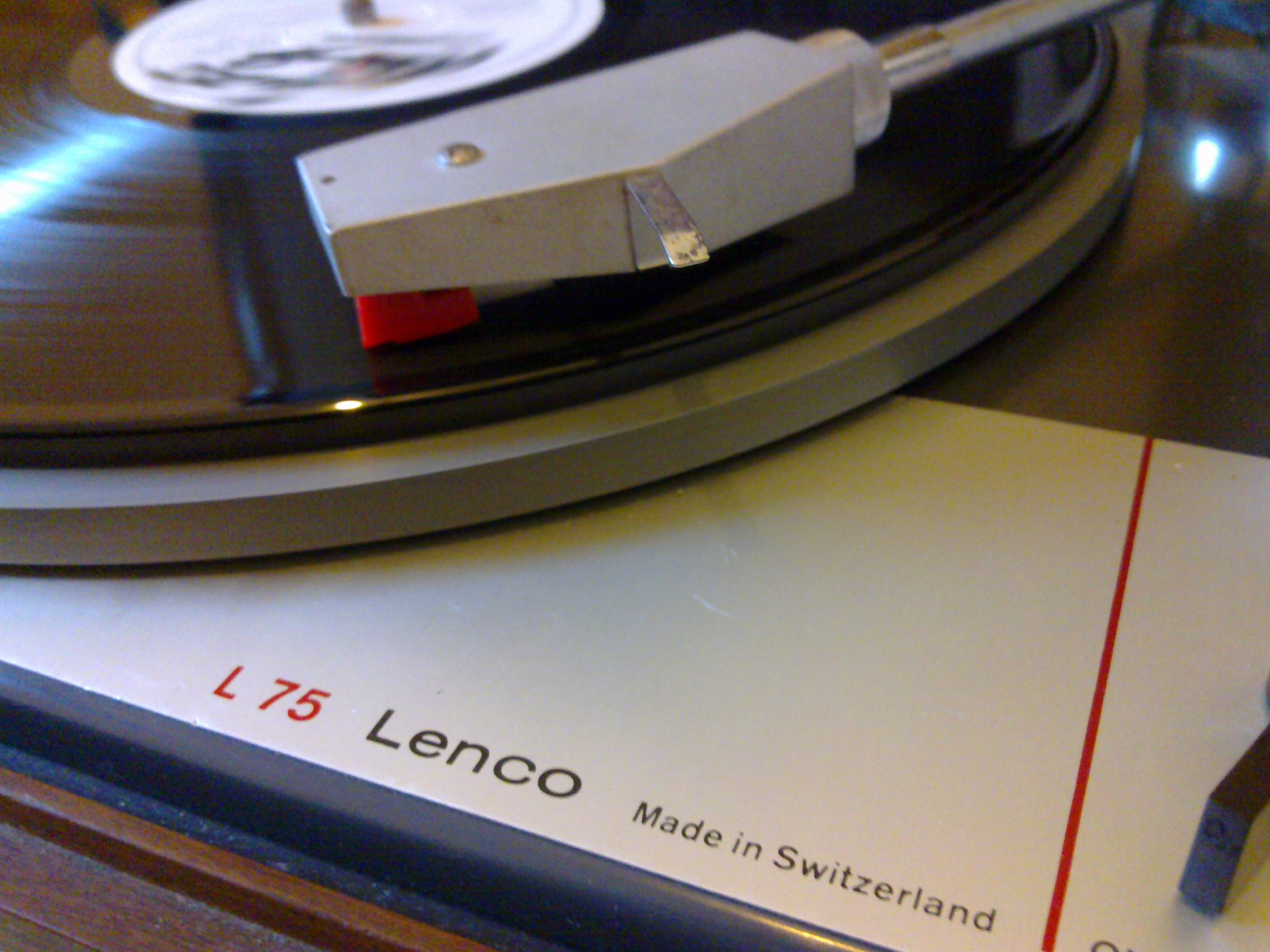
Lenco L75 turntable, produced 1967-1985

In 1961 Lenco opened a factory in Osimo, Italy, where it initially produced electric motors. In the 1970s, the Italian factory started to produce turntables and cassette decks.

The company grew to export its products to over eighty countries around the world.

The mid-1970s downturn in the global economy depressed the demand for high fidelity audio equipment. Coupled with increasing competition from products made in the Far East, Lenco's fortunes declined. Lenco AG Burgdorf was declared bankrupt in 1977, as successor company Lenco Audio AG took over repair, service and warranty duties for existing Lenco equipment until it folded in 1983.

Marie Laeng died in 1974 and Fritz Laeng in 1978.

== Revival of the Lenco name ==
Horst Neugebauer KG, a company from Lahr, Germany, acquired the Lenco name in 1984 and used it on a wide range of products, including amplifiers imported from Korea, with limited commercial success.

In 1997 the name Lenco was acquired by the Lenco STL Group of Venlo in the Netherlands. It was primarily used on low budget products imported from manufacturers in South East Asia.

In 2015 the company was bought by Commaxx International NV and the brand applied to internet radios, DAB+ radios, DVD players, TV sets and other audio equipment, including turntables.

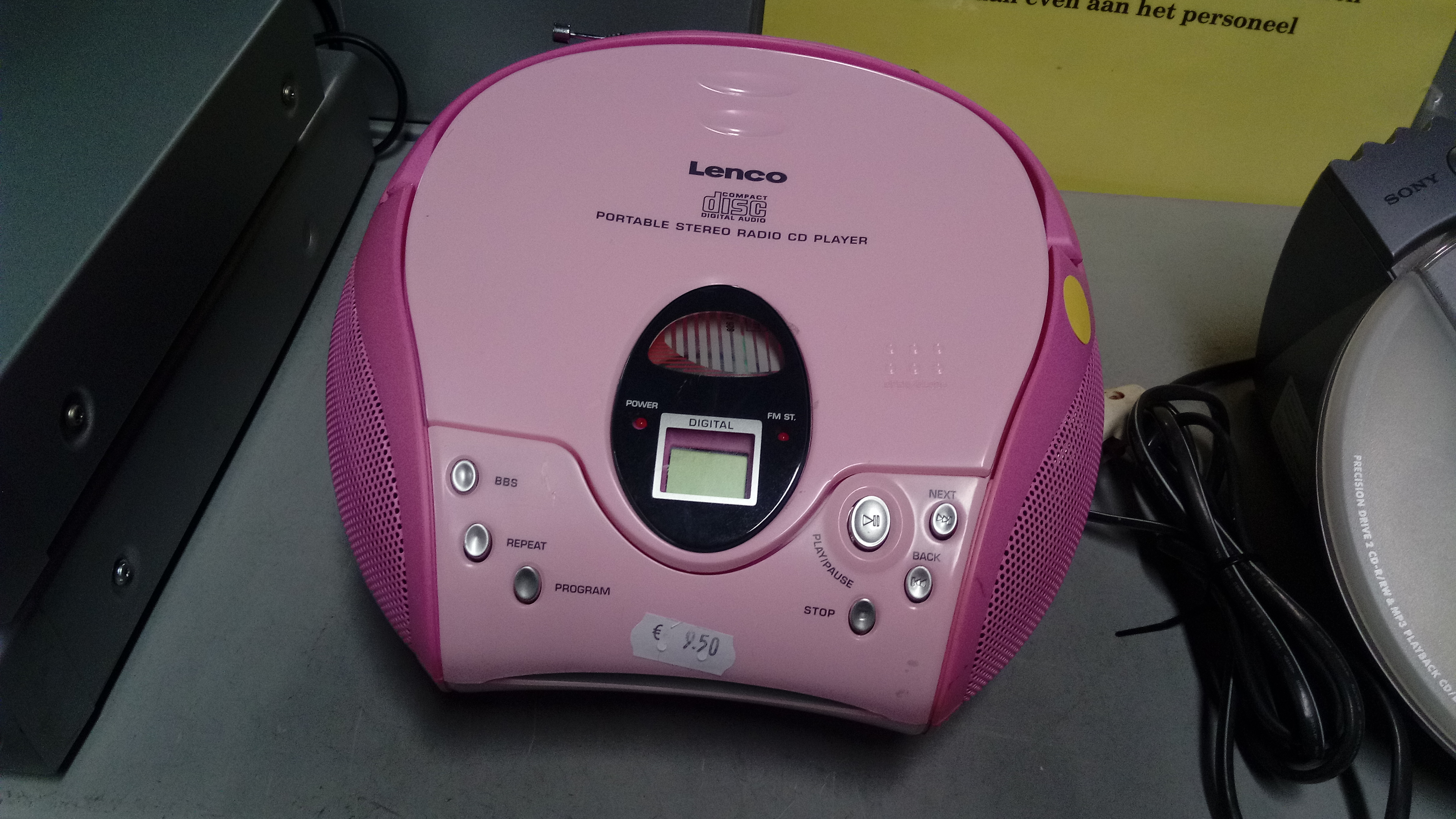
Lenco SCD-24 Radio CD player, 2019

== See also ==
- List of phonograph manufacturers
