= Rüschlikon =

- Municipality
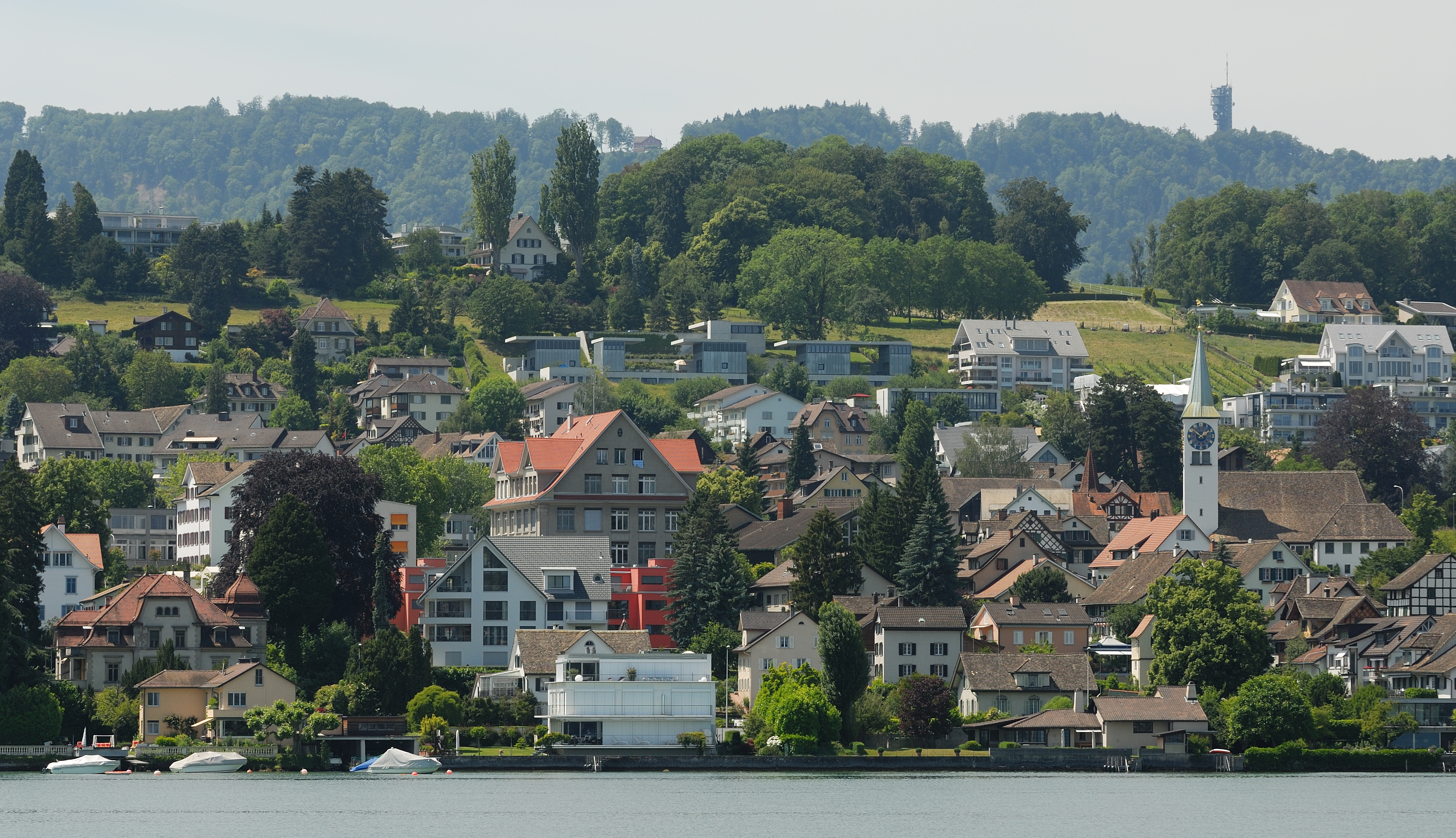

- Flag Coat of arms
- Location of Rüschlikon
- Location within Switzerland Location within Canton of Zürich
- Coordinates: 47.308056°N 8.554167°E
- Country: Switzerland
- Canton: Zürich
- District: Horgen

Government
  - Mayor: Dr. Fabian Müller

Area
  - Total: 2.94 km^{2} (1.14 sq mi)
- Elevation: 406 m (1,332 ft)

Population (December 2020)
  - Total: 6,113
  - Density: 2,080/km^{2} (5,390/sq mi)
- Time zone: UTC+01:00 (CET)
  - Summer (DST): UTC+02:00 (CEST)
- Postal code: 8803
- SFOS number: 139
- ISO 3166 code: CH-ZH
- Surrounded by: Adliswil, Kilchberg, Küsnacht, Langnau am Albis, Thalwil
- Website: www.rueschlikon.ch

Rüschlikon is a municipality in the district of Horgen in the canton of Zürich in Switzerland. It is located on the west shore of Lake Zürich.

== Coat of arms ==
Its coat of arms features a white shield showing a red rose with a yellow center and a green two-leaved stem.

== History ==
Earliest archaeological findings are grave mounds from the early Iron Age Hallstatt culture (800-450BC) on the Zimmerberg mountain. The name of Rüschlikon is Alemannic and first appears in documents around 1153 as Ruoslinchoven. In the early 1980s, Rüschlikon blocked off many of the smaller side streets from Thalwil so that traffic between Zürich and Thalwil would be unable to use them.

The Swiss Re Centre for Global Dialogue is based in Rüschlikon. The centre is built in the grounds of the Villa Bodmer, which was owned by the Swiss industrialist Karl Martin Leonhard Bodmer.

Aerial view from 100 m by Walter Mittelholzer (1919)

The CEO of commodities company Glencore, Ivan Glasenberg, is a resident of Rüschlikon. Glasenberg paid 360 million SFr (£240m) in taxes to Rüschlikon following Glencore's flotation on the London Stock Exchange. The money enabled the residents to cut their taxation rate by 7%, which was approved by large majority after a public vote.

The money attracted criticism from some Rüschlikon residents with regards to Glencore's alleged controversial business practices. The finance director of nearby Winterthur village council, which is due to receive a large proportion of the money via a system that diverts funds to the poorest villages said that "I am not really happy about this money. I can't ignore who is actually paying the price for this and I don't like the fact that a few commodity traders make billions while the people in the producing countries remain bitterly poor."

== Geography ==
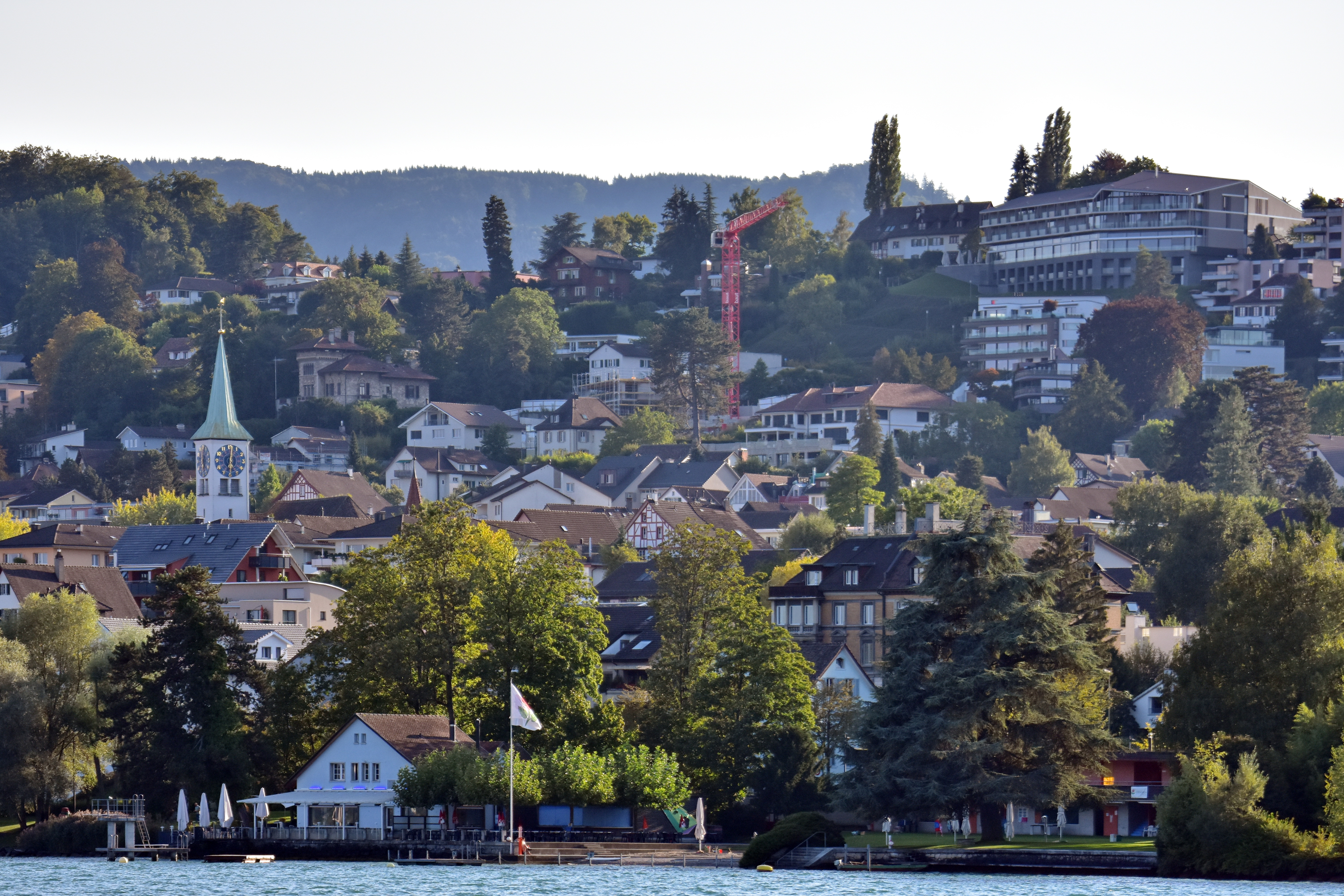
Rüschlikon and its church as seen from Zürichsee-Schifffahrtsgesellschaft (ZSG) ship MS Helvetia

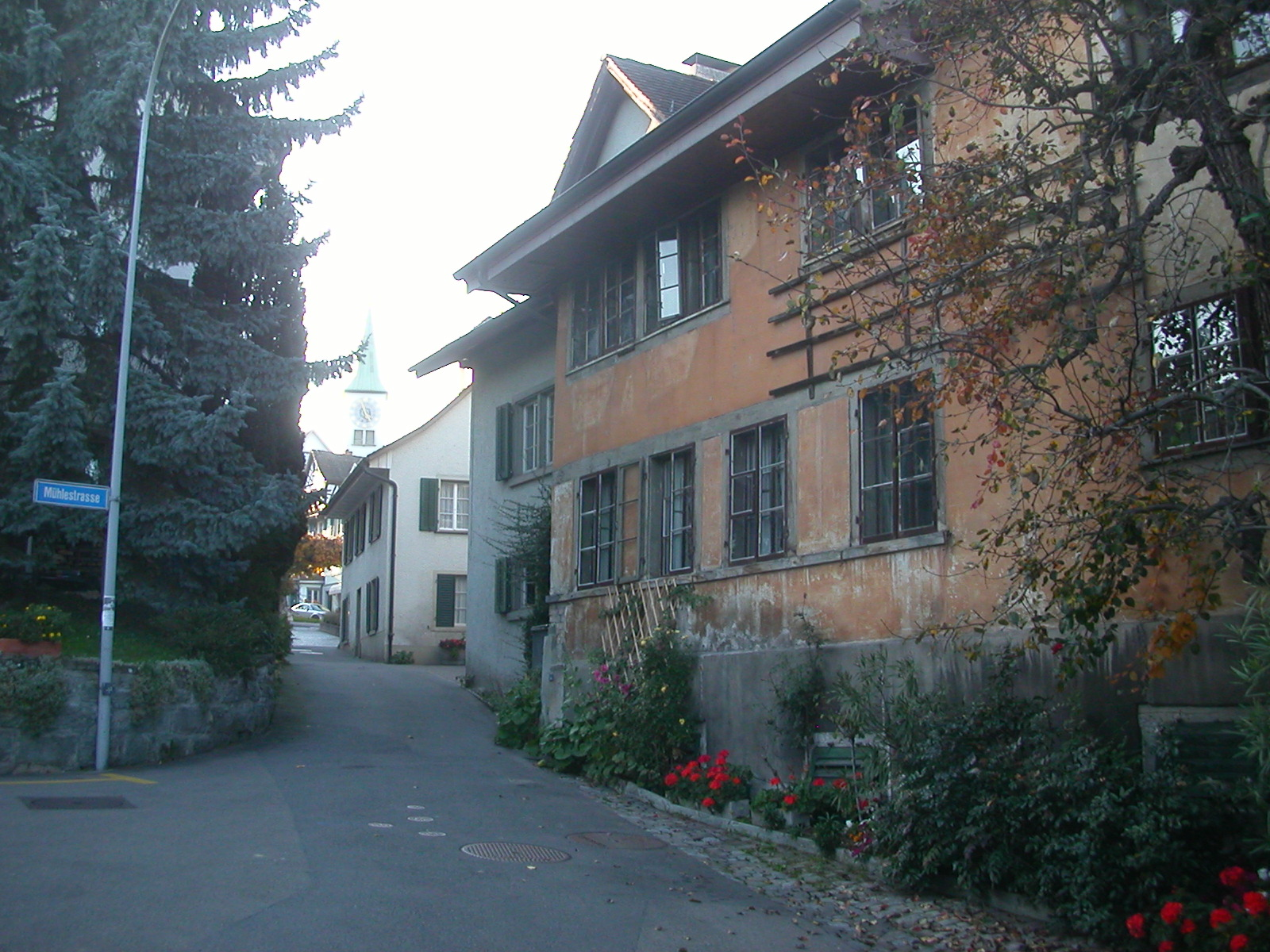
The old part of Rüschlikon

Rüschlikon has an area of 2.9 km^{2} (1.1 sq mi). Of this area, 20.5% is used for agricultural purposes, while 23.3% is forested. Of the rest of the land, 55.5% is settled (buildings or roads) and the remainder (0.7%) is non-productive (rivers, glaciers or mountains). In 1996 housing and buildings made up 41.5% of the total area, while transportation infrastructure made up the rest (13.3%). Of the total unproductive area, water (streams and lakes) made up 1% of the area. As of 2007 44.2% of the total municipal area was undergoing some type of construction.

Rüschlikon is bordered on the north by Kilchberg, on the east by Lake Zürich, on the south by Thalwil, and on the west by Adliswil and Langnau am Albis. A steep slope rises from lake Zürich towards the Zimmerberg and, at its peak, the hill called Chopf, then slopes down towards the river Sihl. Although mostly a dormitory town for Zürich, Rüschlikon has a very small but characteristic town center, parks by the lake and considerable wooded areas and farms, mostly in the hills. The farms include cattle, horses, sheep, and a few exotic animals, as well as areas under cultivation.

== Politics ==
In the 2007 election the most popular party was the SVP which received 32.6% of the vote. The next three most popular parties were the FDP (26.8%), the SPS (13.5%) and the CVP (9.3%).

The president of the commune of Rüschlikon is Bernhard Elsener (CVP).

== Demographics ==
Rüschlikon has a population (as of 31 December 2020) of 6,113. As of 2007, 22.5% of the population was made up of foreign nationals. As of 2008 the gender distribution of the population was 47.9% male and 52.1% female. Over the last 10 years the population has grown at a rate of 10.4%. Most of the population (as of 2000) speaks German (85.1%), with English being the second most common language (3.9%) and Italian third (2.3%).

The age distribution of the population (as of 2000) is children and teenagers (0–19 years old) make up 19% of the population, while adults (20–64 years old) make up 59.7% and seniors (over 64 years old) make up 21.3%. In Rüschlikon about 85.9% of the population (between age 25-64) have completed either non-mandatory upper secondary education or additional higher education (either University or a Fachhochschule). There are 2243 households in Rüschlikon.

Rüschlikon has an unemployment rate of 2.28%. As of 2005, there were 27 people employed in the primary economic sector and about 5 businesses involved in this sector. 378 people are employed in the secondary sector and there are 37 businesses in this sector. 1781 people are employed in the tertiary sector, with 207 businesses in this sector. As of 2007 60% of the working population were employed full-time, and 40% were employed part-time.

As of 2008 there were 1475 Catholics and 1853 Protestants in Rüschlikon. In the 2000 census, religion was broken down into several smaller categories. From the census, 44.7% were some type of Protestant, with 43.3% belonging to the Swiss Reformed Church and 1.4% belonging to other Protestant churches. 28.6% of the population were Catholic. Of the rest of the population, 0% were Muslim, 5.7% belonged to another religion (not listed), 3.7% did not give a religion, and 16.6% were atheist or agnostic.

The historical population is given in the following table:

year	population
1467	40 households
1671	515
1836	825
1850	909
1900	1,567
1950	3,316
2000	4,858
2010	5,227
2020	6,120

== IBM Zürich research laboratory ==
Rüschlikon is home to the IBM Zurich Research Lab, part of IBM Research, which has brought to Rüschlikon the Nobel Prize in Physics awarded to Heinrich Rohrer and Gerd Binnig in 1986 and to Karl Alexander Müller and Johannes Georg Bednorz in 1987.

== Park im Grüene ==
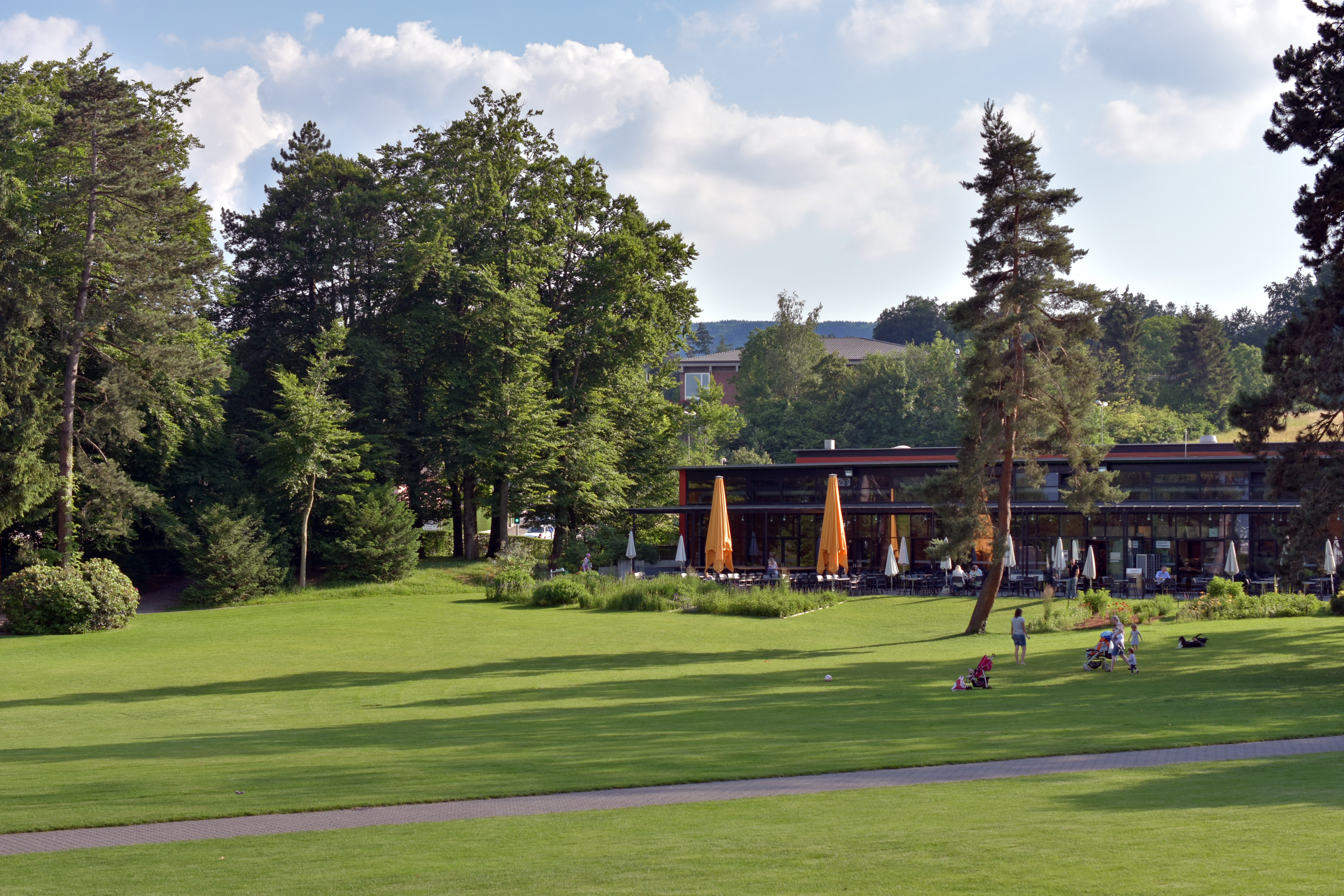
Park im Grüene

The "Dutti-Park" or Park im Grüene was donated by Adele Duttweiler, widow of Gottlieb Duttweiler, the founder of the Migros chain of grocery stores.

== Transport ==
The town is served by frequent rail connections (4 an hour to Zürich in 2016) provided by the Swiss Federal Railways and S-Bahn Zürich, by bus service with the 165 bus to Zürich Bürkliplatz (2 an hour in 2016), and (in the summer) boat service to the other lakeside communities. Rüschlikon railway station is a stop of the S-Bahn Zürich on the S8 and S24 lines. Tourist boat trips, run by the Zürichsee-Schifffahrtsgesellschaft, also sail from Zürich and Rapperswil. The town is also well-linked by regular roads and the A3 highway.
