= Adele Duttweiler =

Swiss philanthropist (1892–1990)

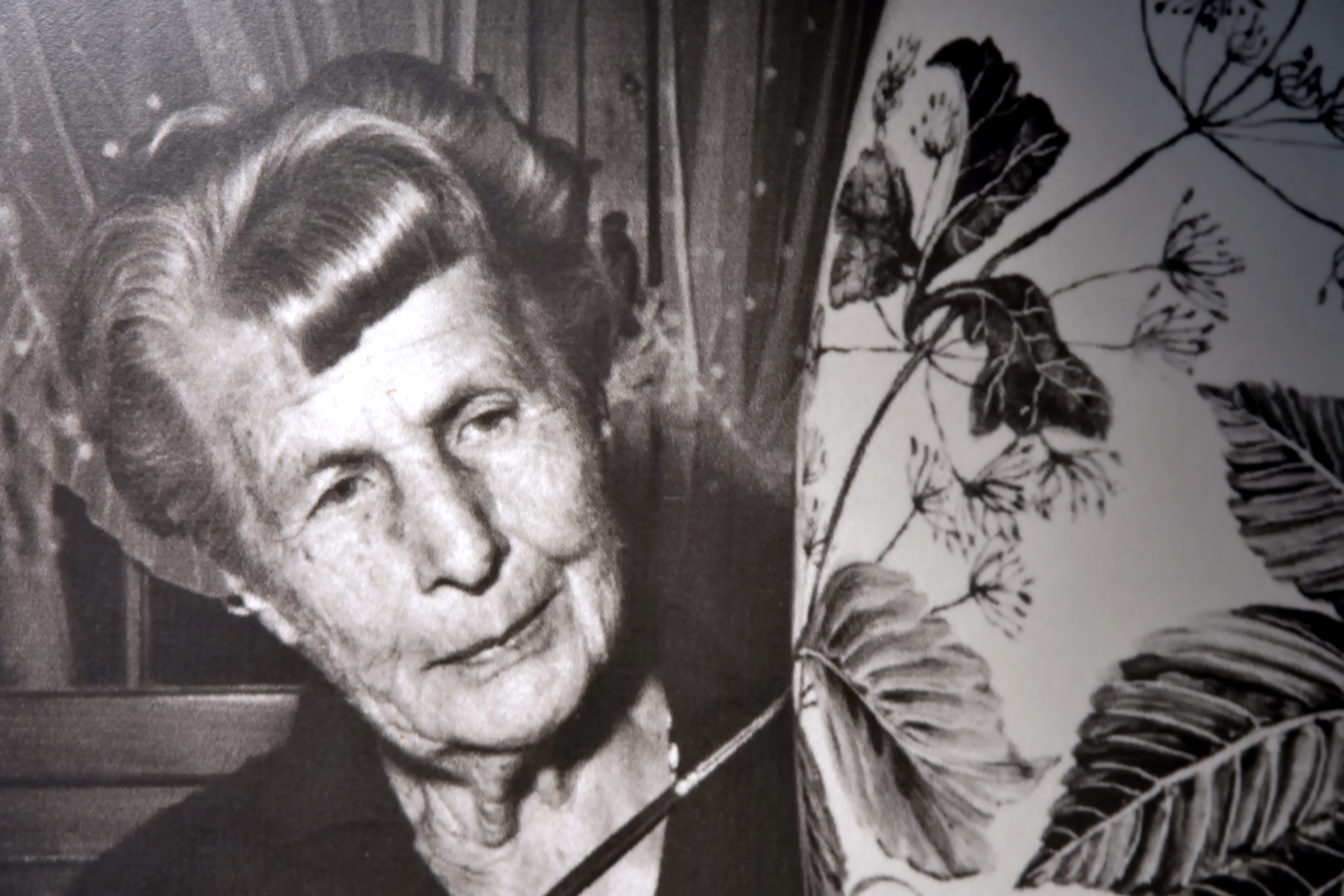
- Adele Duttweiler attending a course of the so-called Klubschule
- Born: Adele Bertschi; 29 December 1892; Horgen, Switzerland
- Died: 27 May 1990 (aged 97); Rüschlikon, Switzerland
- Monuments: Park im Grüene
- Occupations: Swiss businesswoman and philanthropist
- Years active: 1925–1990
- Known for: Migros
- Spouse: Gottlieb Duttweiler
- Awards: Adele-Duttweiler-Preis

Adele Duttweiler (née Bertschi; 29 December 1892 – 27 May 1990) was a Swiss philanthropist. She was married to Gottlieb Duttweiler, founder of the Migros concern and the LdU political party.

== Early life and education ==
Duttweiler was born Adele Bertschi on 29 December 1892 in Horgen on Lake Zürich, one of six children, to Samuel Bertschi (1821–1901), a retired silk ribbon manufacturer, and Marie Bertschi (née Antille). She had four half-siblings in America and five more siblings in Switzerland, of which only three reached adulthood.

Her paternal family originally hailed from Dürrenäsch. In 1854, her father emigrated to the United States aboard the North Wind. Together with his first wife he settled in New York City, where he founded one of the first silk manufacturing companies, employing several hundred people at three locations in Manhattan, including on Broome Street in Lower Manhattan.

Adele was raised on the In Rüsler farm in Horgen amongst her six siblings, of which only three reached adulthood. After primary school, Adele completed the one-year exchange in Romandy, as it was custom for young women at the time to learn the French language whilst working in a household.

== Career and marriage ==
Duttweiler worked as an employee of ETH Zürich in the seeds control department.

As employee of ETH Zürich, Adele Bertschi traveled daily by train from Horgen to Zürich. Around the year 1911, a handsome, young, well-dressed man from Rüschlikon began to sit down opposite the rather shy young acting 19-year-old woman, annoying Adele: "He looked at me with big eyes. I was not really happy, I was still almost a child. But probably just my reticence has irritated him not to give up." When his courtship seemed to show no result, he tried a hackney. As soon as he had learned to ride, he visited his beloved at her home in Horgen. Unfortunately, his appearance attracted more impression to Adele's mother and sister. The mother then invited the imposing but somewhat uncertain tab for lunch. Adele Duttweiler expressed concerns where they seemed attached to her, even in quite commercial matters. He listened to their advice, and his in-the-future-thinking was always added by Adele's sense of the reality of the presence.

In 1912, the then-24-year-old Gottlieb and the almost 20-year-old Adele celebrated their engagement, and on 29 March 1913, the couple were married.

== Migros ==
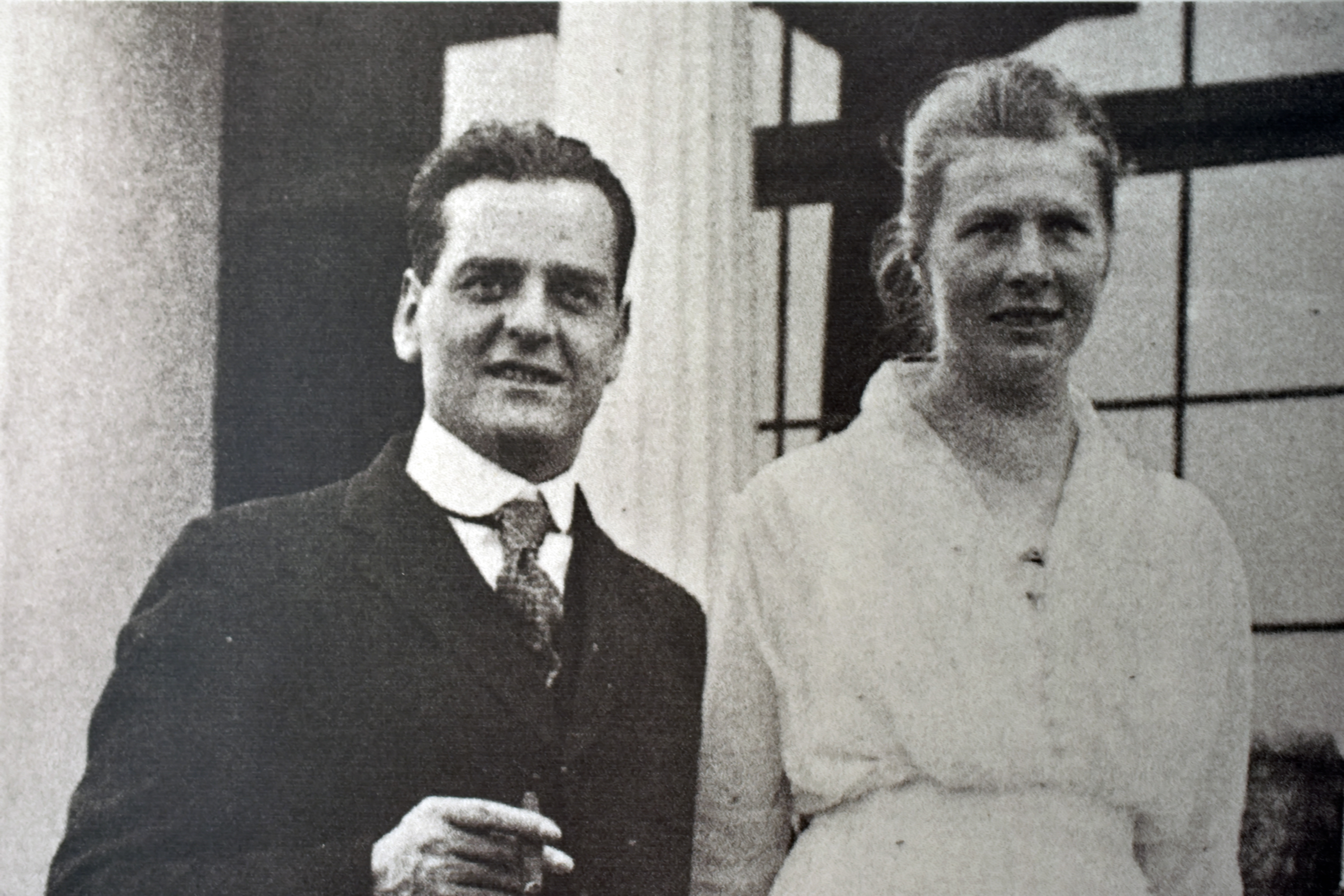
Marriage of Adele and Gottlieb Duttweiler

In 1923 Gottlieb and Adele Duttweiler went to Brazil but had to return to Switzerland in 1924 because of a serious illness of Adele. Then they settled down again in Rüschlikon where the present Migros group was founded in 1925. In 1941 Gottlieb and Adele Duttweiler transferred ownership of Migros to their customers, as a cooperative. In 1946 they passed over their estate to the Im Grüene foundation, and the Park im Grüene was opened to the public in 1947.

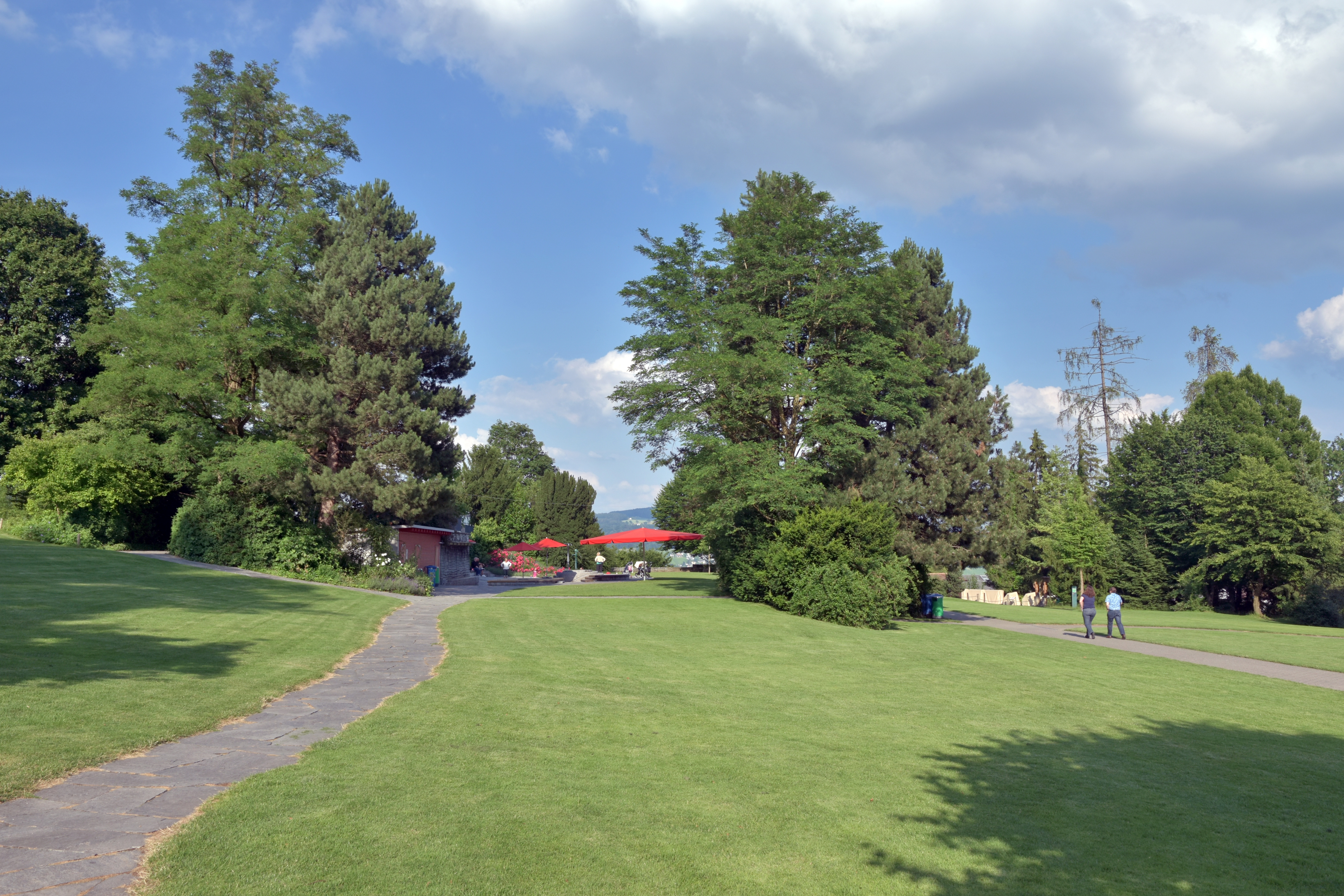
Park im Grüene

The park area comprises the former Langenhalden estate of Adele and Gottlieb Duttweiler, who gave over the spacious area of their estate to the public use in 1946/47 – hence the admission is free, according to Duttweiler's social understanding. The accordingly Im Grüene foundation was established on 24 December 1946. The foundation's assets include the 4.5 hectares (11 acres) Langhalden estate and an endowment. At the time the foundation was established, the donation had a total value of 520,000 Swiss Francs, which after adjusting for inflation is equal to about 2.6 million Swiss Francs today. The Foundation was tasked to make the Langhalden estate available to the general public as a place of recreation. The donor's intentions were realised by turning the estate into the «Im Grüene» Park (known locally as «Dutti-Park»).

The cargo ship Adele of the Reederei Zürich AG was named after her in 1952. In 1950 respectively in 1957, Adele and Gottlieb Dutweiler established the Adele und Gottlieb Duttweiler Stiftung to ensure the future work of the Migros chain as a cooperative according to the founding act.

== Adele-Duttweiler-Preis ==
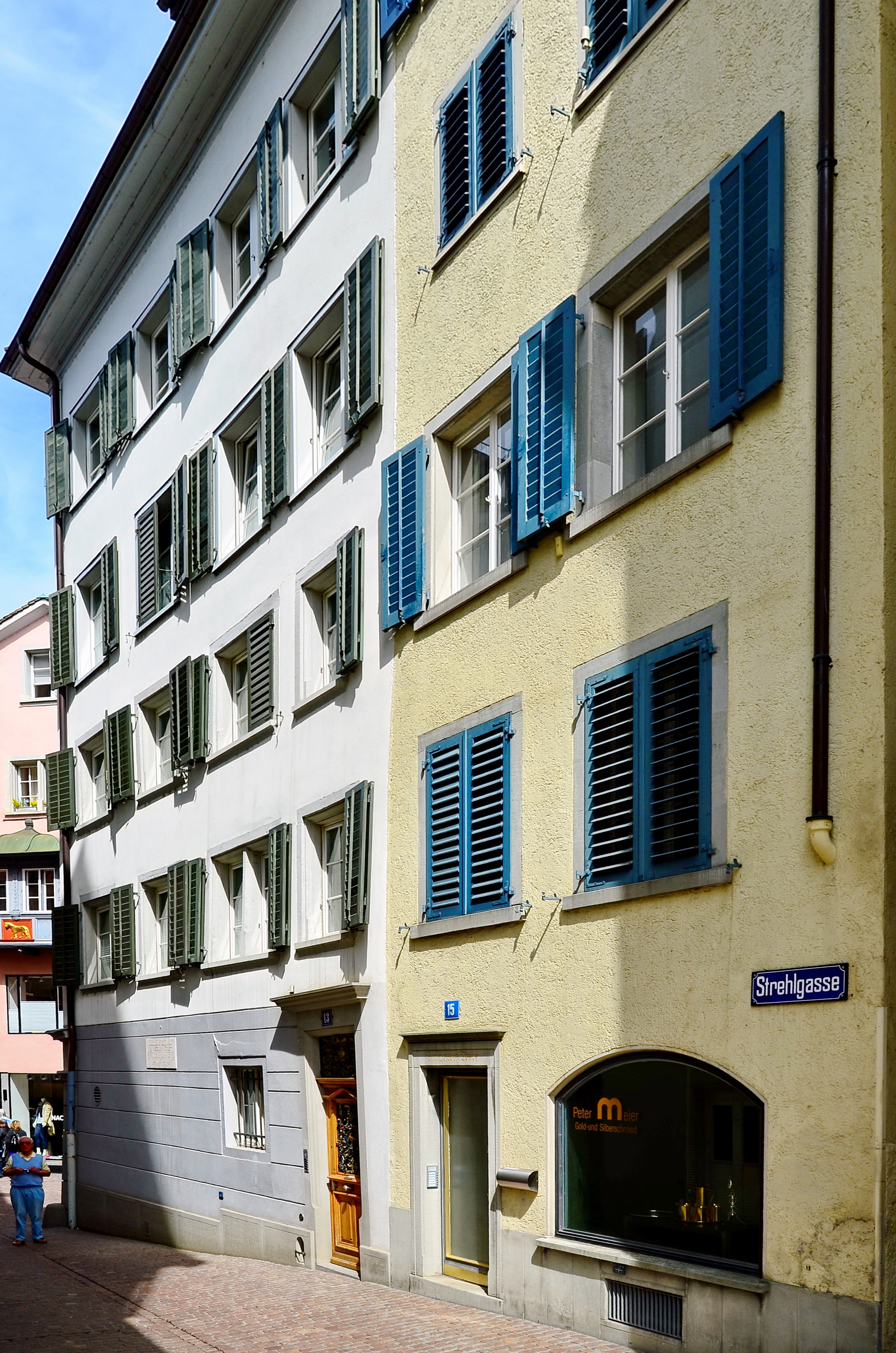
Strehlgasse 13, Lindenhof in Zurich, birthplace of Gottlieb Duttweiler

On 2 July 1974 the Adele-Duttweiler-Preis was awarded for the first time. The award includes prize money of 50,000 Swiss Francs and was initiated by the 12 regional Migros cooperatives, which decided in 1972 to mark the 80th birthday of Adele Duttweiler to donate a prize, to recalls Adele Duttweiler's selfless work. The foundation was established on 9 October 1973 and periodically honours individuals, organizations or institutions who have rendered outstanding services in the social field.

== Late life and death ==
Adele Duttweiler was nominated by her home community Rüschlikon as an honorary citizen on 19 January 1974. On 31 August 1984 the Kurklinik für Erfahrungsmedizin, Al Ronc opened in Castaneda in the Canton of Grison. The present Paracelsus Clinica al Ronc is a health clinic for medical experience that was initiated by Adele Duttwiler. On her 95th birthday she learnt that the Migros cooperative Migros-Genossenschafts-Bund (MGB) bought her husband's birthplace at Strehlgasse 13 in Zürich.

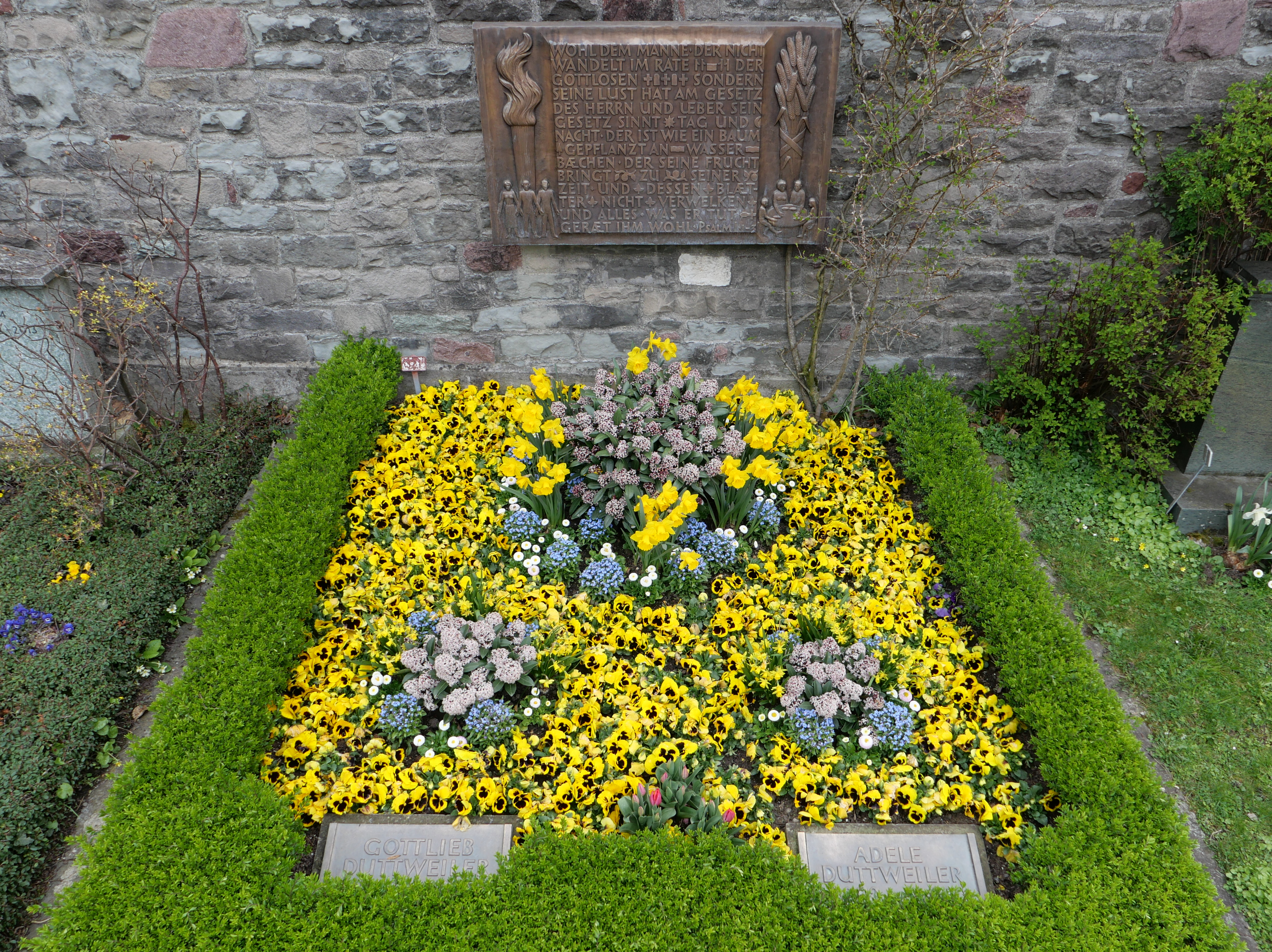
The grave of the couple.

Adele Duttweiler survived her husband by 28 years and died on 27 May 1990 at the age of 97 at her home in Rüschlikon. The burial at the cemetery in Rüschlikon, alongside her husband, was followed by a funeral service in the Fraumünster church, which was filled to the last seat. Jules Kyburz, chairman of the board MGB, portrayed with moving words Adele Duttweiler's life and work, and Reverend Peter Vogelsanger called and remembered the life stages of this unusual woman.

== Aftermath ==
The orange rose Adele Duttweiler was named after her in 2014. The Adele-Duttweiler-Preis for people and organizations that have been particularly active in the social sphere is awarded annually.

== See also ==
- Adele (1952 ship)
- Park im Grüene

== Literature ==
- Alfred A. Häsler: Adele Duttweiler-Bertschi. Ein Jahrhundert-Leben. Edition M, Zürich 1993.
