= Gottlieb Duttweiler =

Swiss businessman and politician

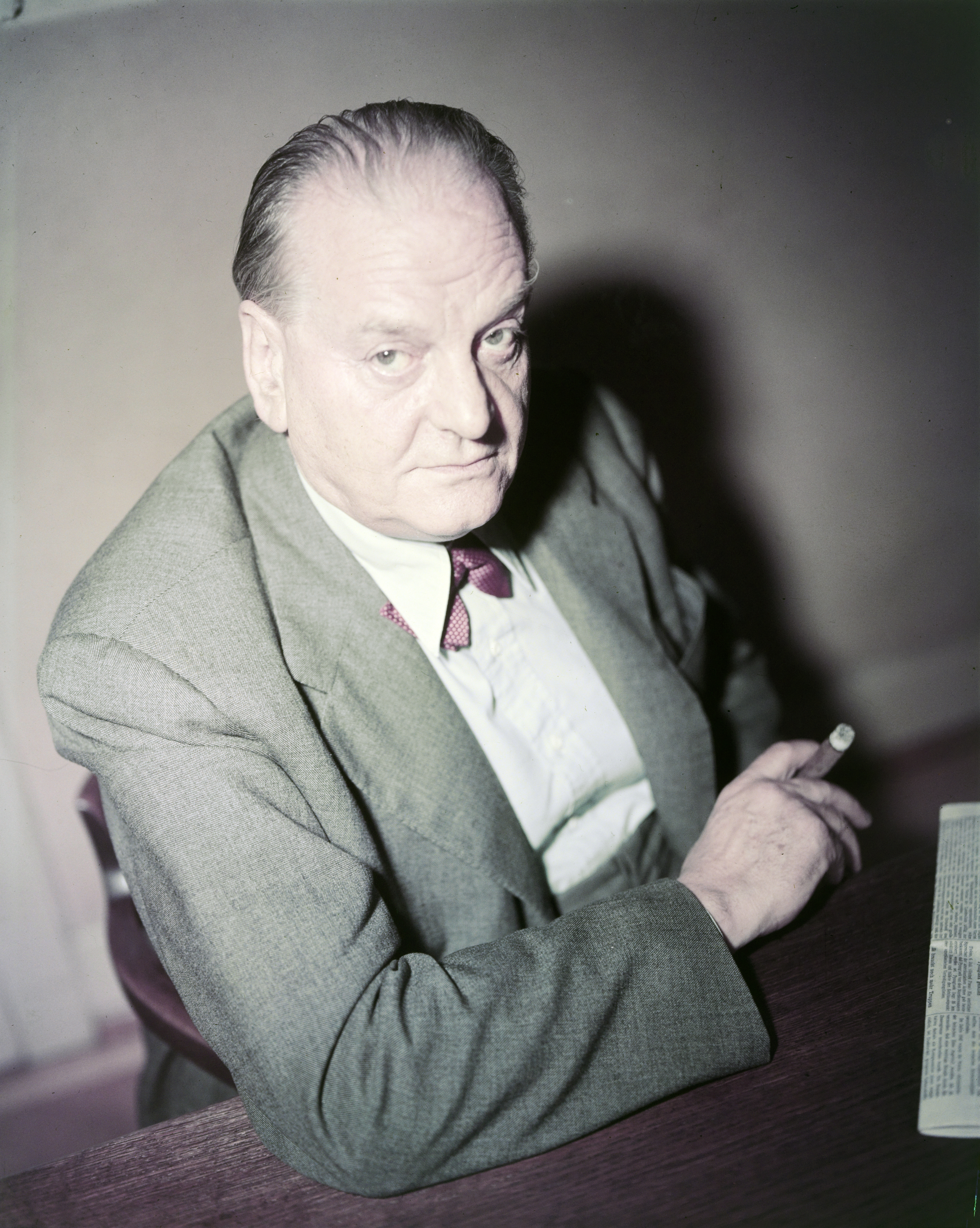
- Gottlieb Duttweiler c. 1956

Personal details
- Born: 15 August 1888 Zürich, Switzerland
- Died: 8 June 1962 (aged 73) Zürich, Switzerland
- Party: Landesring der Unabhängigen (LdU)
- Spouse: Adele Duttweiler
- Occupation: Businessman
- Known for: Migros, LdU

Gottlieb Duttweiler (15 August 1888 – 8 June 1962) was a Swiss businessman and politician, founder of both the Migros chain of grocery stores and the Alliance of Independents (Landesring der Unabhängigen, LDU) party.

== Life and work ==
Duttweiler was born in Zürich. Starting with five vehicles in 1925, his Migros eventually opened stores and is today one of the main grocery chains in Switzerland. The original secret to his success was bringing daily necessities to the consumer by excluding the middlemen. As a result, many producers initially chose to boycott Migros, and Duttweiler's Migros would itself manufacture or package those missing products. In 1941, Gottlieb and his wife Adele Duttweiler transferred ownership of Migros to their customers, as a cooperative. Duttweiler also required that Migros contribute a percentage of profits (actual from the total revenue) to cultural, athletic, and hobby-related activities. This led to the Migros-club-schools and several hobby courses.

He also initiated the so-called Park im Grüene or Dutti-Park at the site of the later institute that was named after Gottlieb Duttweiler. In 1949, he participated at the former Buchclub Ex Libris, which was integrated in the Migros group in 1956. The Zürich-based Reederei Zürich AG ordered at the H. C. Stülcken Sohn shipyard in Hamburg, Germany, the cargo ship Adele which was launched in Hamburg on 15 July 1952, the ship was christened by Adele Duttweiler, the wife of Gottlieb Duttweiler, on behalf of the Federation of Migros Cooperatives (Migros Genossenschaftsbund). In 1958, he founded the Migros Bank.

Duttweiler also founded the political party Alliance of Independents (Landesring der Unabhängigen) in 1936. Duttweiler was a supporter of the women's suffrage in Switzerland. According to the Migros legend, alone Duttweiler discovered the women's needs in 1925. Following a dispute raged between the new Migros the established retailers which Duttweiler deemed as enemies of the women due to their practice of selling overpriced products. Following family fathers shall have boycotted him and housewives secretly bought at his shops. Adele and Gottlieb Dutweiler established the Adele und Gottlieb Duttweiler Stiftung to ensure the future work of the Migros chain as a cooperative according to the founding act.

Duttweiler died in Zürich. The Gottlieb Duttweiler Institute in Rüschlikon was founded after his death.

== Gallery ==
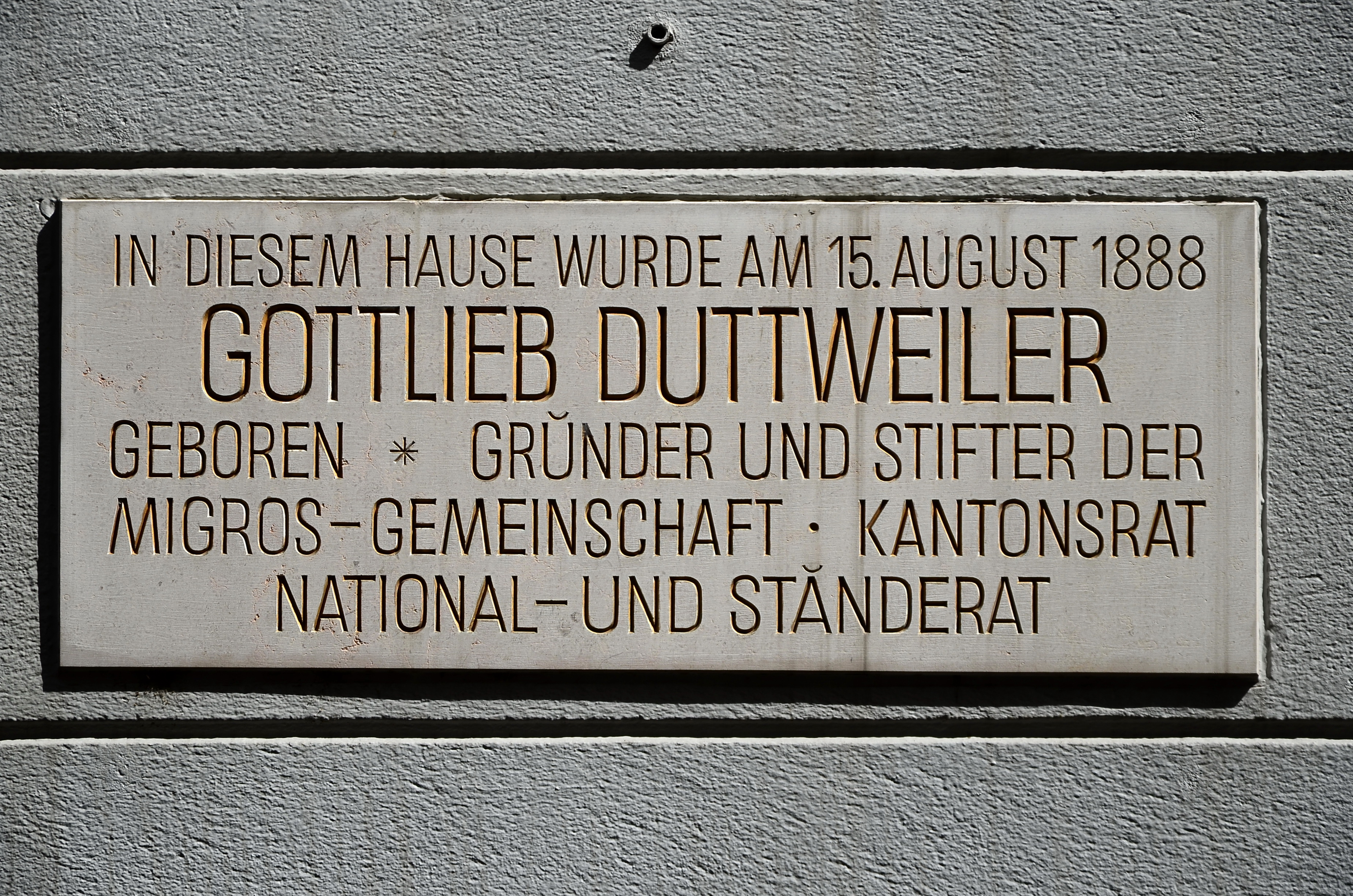
Plaque at Strehlgasse 13, Lindenhof in Zürich, birthplace of Duttweiler

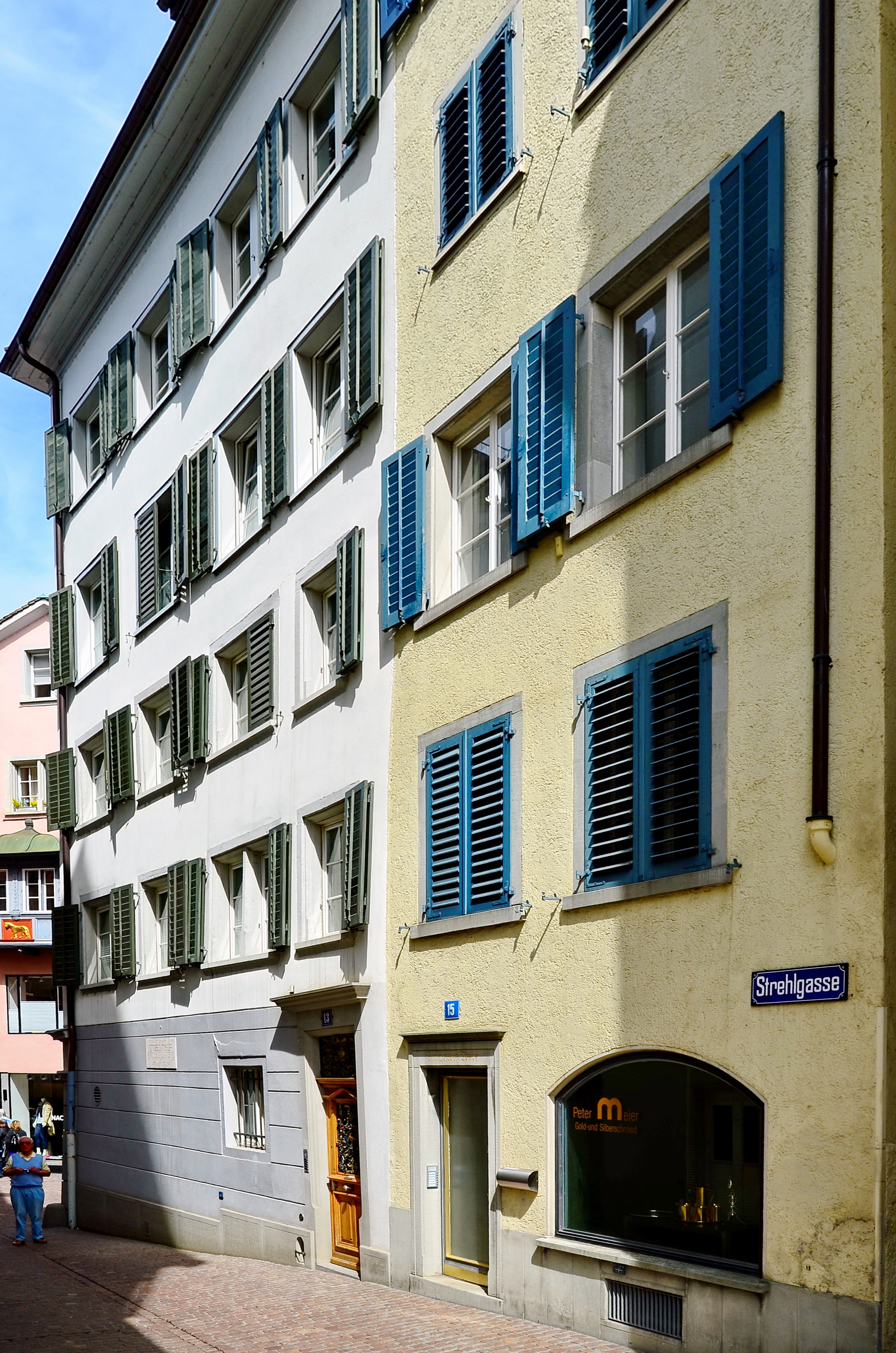
Strehlgasse 13

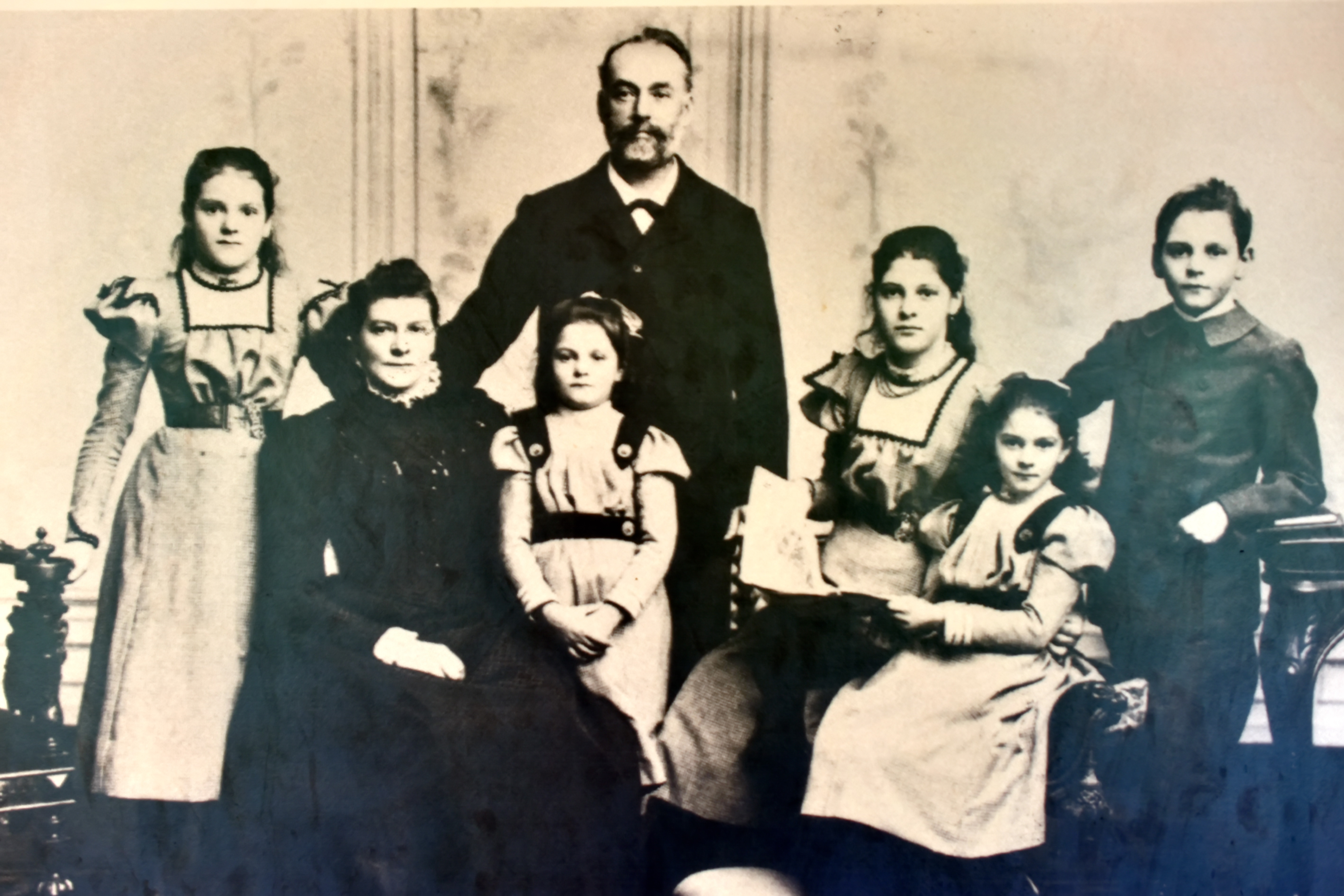
The Duttweiler family with Gottlieb to the right

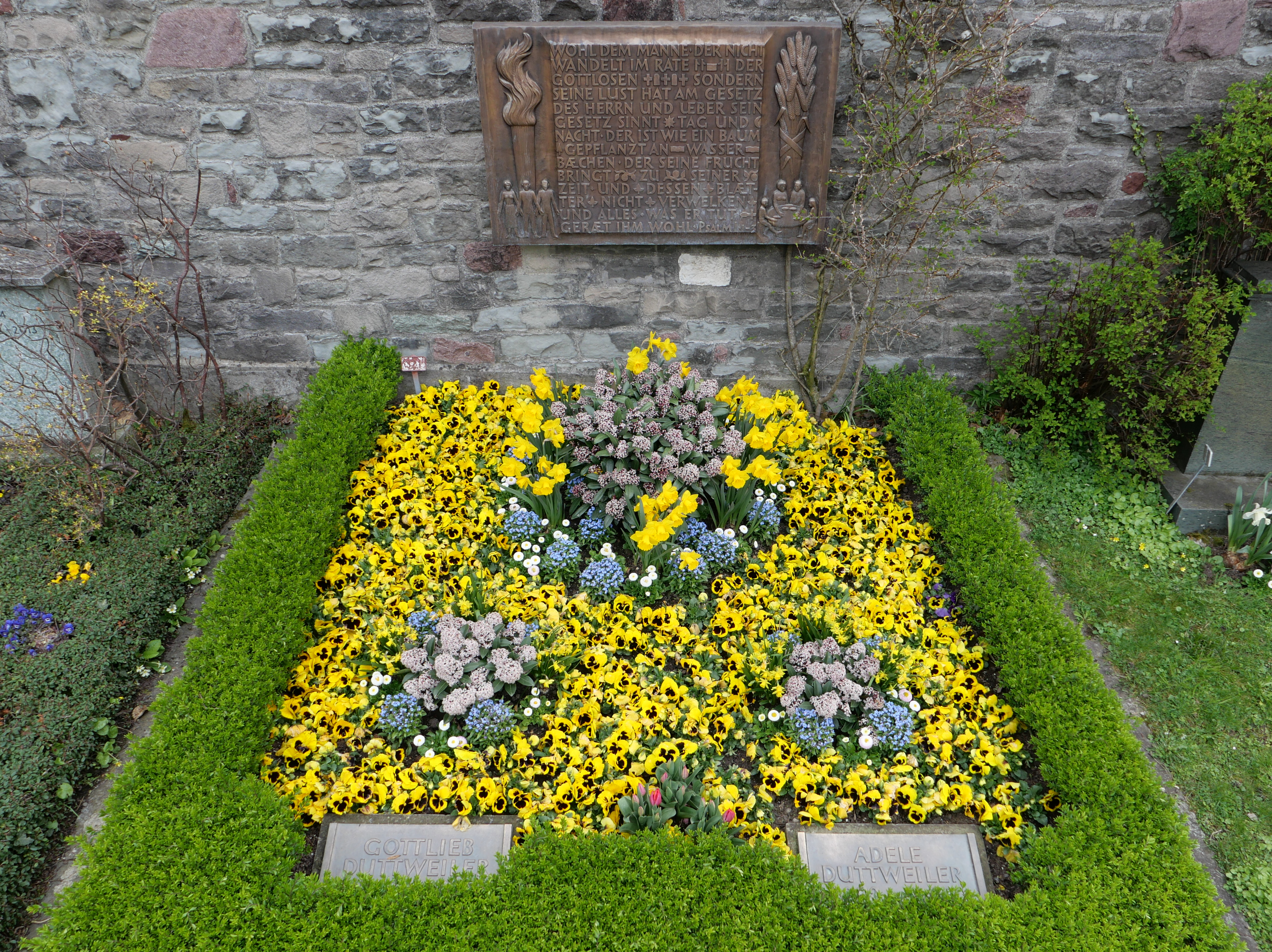
The grave of Duttweiler and his wife at the cemetery of Rüschlikon.
