= Midor =

Defunct Swiss food and drink company

Midor AG
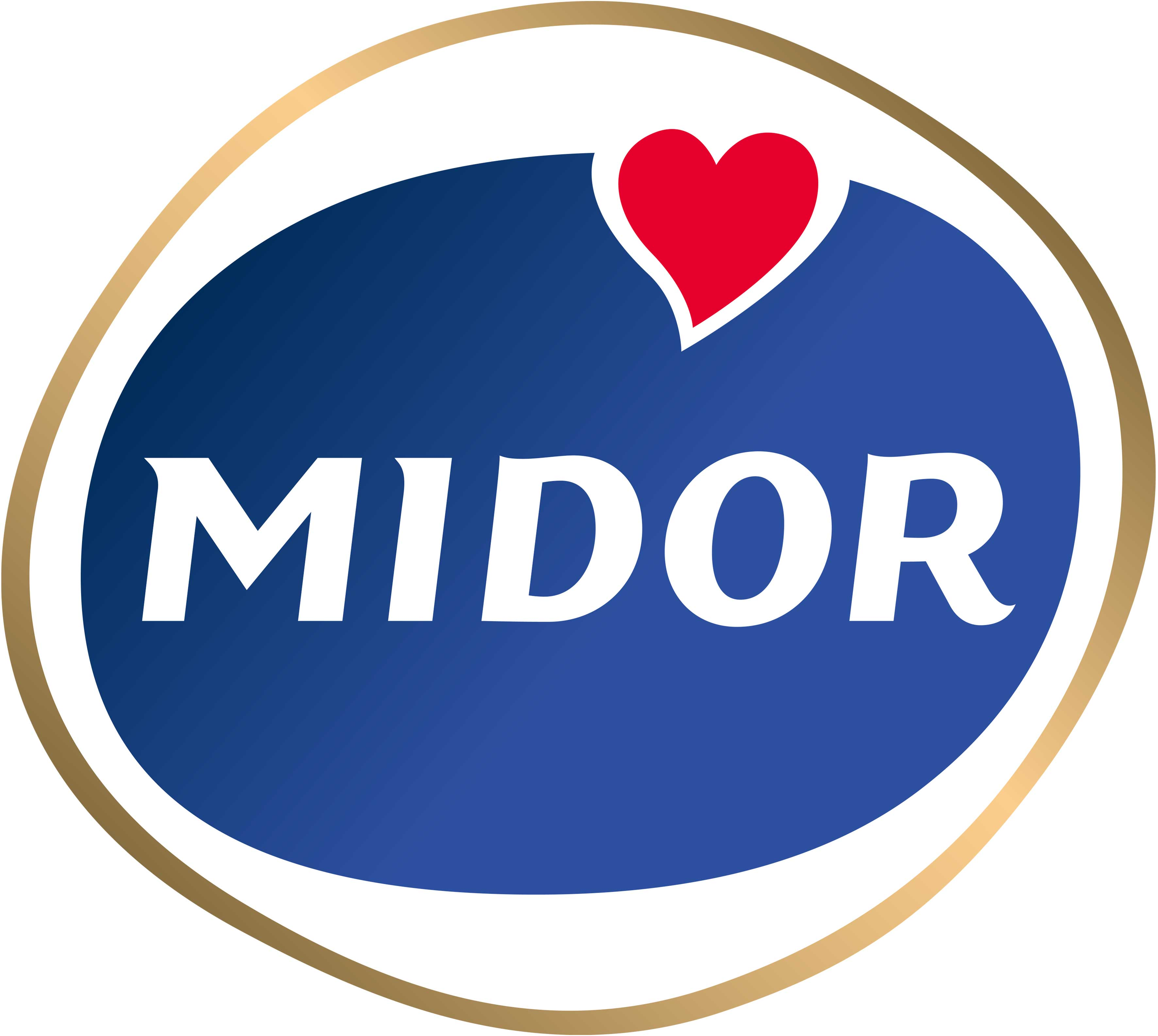
- Founded: 1928
- Defunct: 2021
- Fate: Merger to Delica AG
- Headquarters: Meilen, canton of Zurich, Switzerland
- Number of employees: 612 (2020)

Midor AG was a company of the Swiss retail group Migros, which developed and produced biscuits, ice cream and snacks. It supplied customers in Switzerland and 19 other countries. Midor also produced numerous products for Migros brands and large corporations in Switzerland and abroad. Midor was founded in 1928 and belonged to the M-Industrie Gruppe (M-Industry group). It employed around 600 people at its location in Meilen at Lake Zurich.

The Migros industrial companies Delica, Chocolat Frey, Riseria Taverne and Totale Capsule Solutions were merged with Midor to form the new Delica AG on 1 June 2021.

== History ==
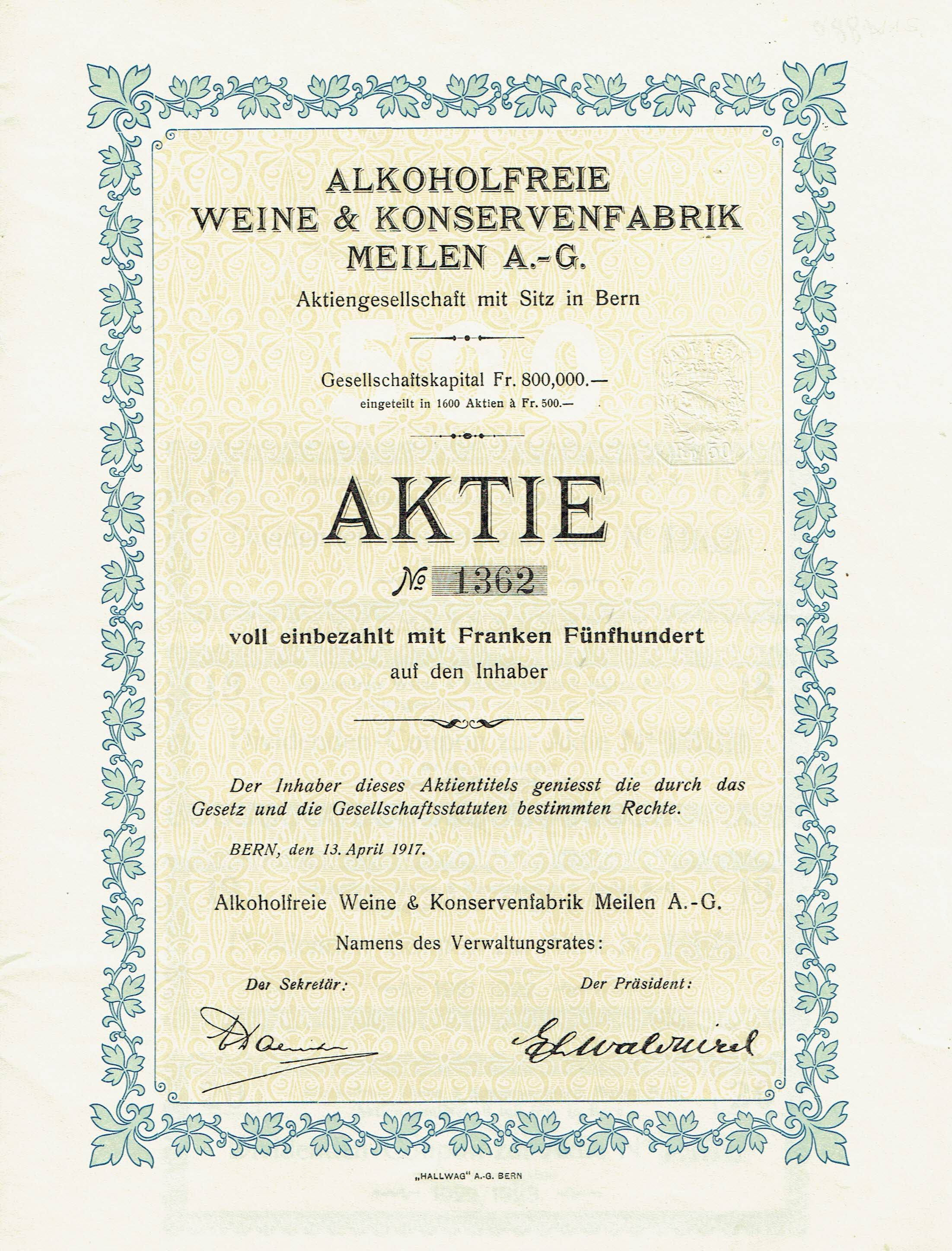
Share for 500 francs of Alkoholfreie Weine & Konservenfabrik Meilen AG dated April 13, 1917

On 13 June 1896, the Erste schweizerische Aktiengesellschaft zur Herstellung unvergorener und alkoholfreier Trauben- und Obstweine (First Swiss Stock Corporation for the Production of Unfermented and Alcohol-Free Grape and Fruit Wines) was founded in Bern with a share capital of 250,000 francs. Their goal was to produce unfermented grape and fruit juices on a large scale using the "Wädenswiler-process" developed by Hermann Müller-Thurgau. The first factory was built the same year on Laupenstrasse in Bern. In 1899 the company changed its name to Gesellschaft zur Herstellung alkoholfreier Weine (Association for the Production of Non-Alcoholic Wines), with the term "non-alcoholic wines" being a common description for cider at the time. A new factory was built on Lake Zurich near Meilen train station. After canning was also started in 1916/17, the company name was changed to Alkoholfreie Weine & Konservenfabrik AG, Meilen (Alcohol-free Wine & Conserves Factory AG, Meilen).

In 1928, the company was on the verge of bankruptcy. For 50,000 francs, Gottlieb Duttwuiler, the founder of Migros, acquired a creditor position of 400,000 francs from the Schweizerische Kreditanstalt (Swiss credit institution), therefore becoming the main creditor of the company, whose shares were transferred mostly to Migros through inheritance proceedings. The takeover was due to Migros having to produce its own brands in order to circumvent the numerous boycotts of branded goods manufacturers and their associations. The customers were unable to deal with the pressure from the associations, which is why Migros was the only buyer of the products. Duttweiler significantly expanded the production of sweet cider and reduced the price to almost half, to which competitors had to follow in suit. What was once a niche product quickly became a very popular drink.

As suggested by Duttweiler, the name was changed to Produktion AG Meilen (PAG, Production AG Meilen) on 30 October 1929. The PAG soon gave up making sweet cider to make room for the production of other products. Biscuit production started in 1930, and yogurt production began a year later. The production of cooking oil and cooking fat, which also began in 1930, was moved to Basil in 1934. From 1935 onwards, the PAG produced the Fasnachtschüechli, a regional variation of fried dough, which are still sold today and are only available once a year during carnival season. In 1942, PAG integrated the chocolate production previously carried out by Jonatal AG (Jowa today), but in 1955 it handed this, along with confectionery and sweets production, to Chocolat Frey, which also belongs to Migros.

In 1985 the company entered the export business. In 1996, PAG renamed itself Midor AG.

On 1 June 2021, the five companies Midor, Chocolat Frey, Delica, Riseria and Total Capsule Solutions became Delica AG. The main location of the new legally founded company is in Buchs in the canton of Aargau. The existing locations continue to exist as production facilities.

== Products ==
Midor products can be divided up into the following product groups:

- Biscuits
- Ice cream
- Grain based snacks
- Aperitif pastries
- Baking mixtures and dessert powders
- Season specific products
- Rusk

Brands produced by Midor:

- Blévita
- Chocmidor
- Coco ice-Land
- Créa d’Or
- Crème d’Or
- I Gelati
- Megastar
- Petit Beurre
- Seehund-Family
- Swiss Delice
- Tradition Biscuits
