= Giandor =

Chocolate in Switzerland

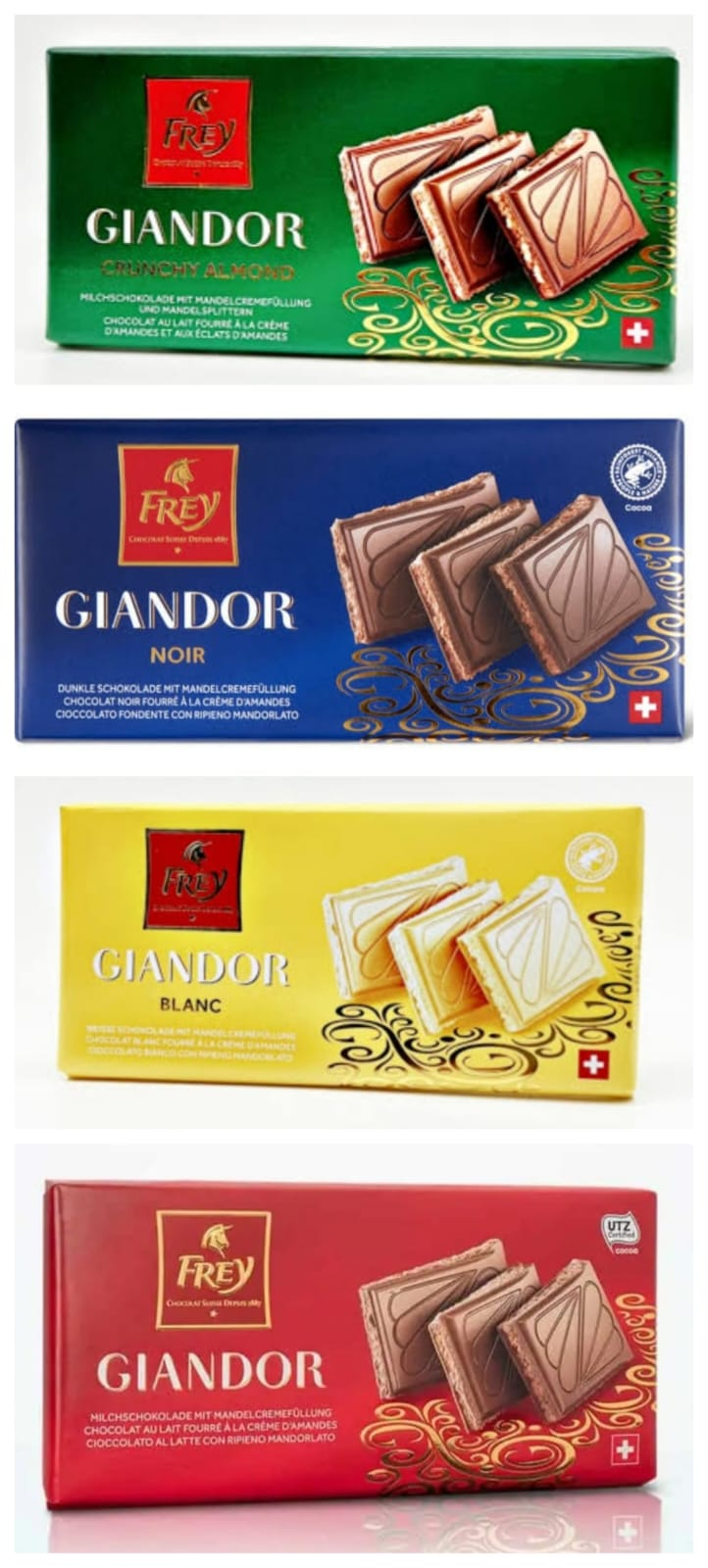
- Type: Swiss Organic Chocolate
- Inception: 1910
- Manufacturer: Frey AG
- Available: Yes
- Website: https://www.migros.ch/en/product/100232500000

Giandor is the name of a chocolate produced in Switzerland by the Swiss company Frey AG, in 1910 Frey AG introduced its new chocolate line named Giandor. Frey AG is a part of the Migros corporation. It is available in Switzerland through the stores of Migros and various local retailers. Giandor is produced in three basic versions: milk, dark, and white chocolate, as well as in various shapes. Giandor chocolate is sold as a certified Bio product, which means that it was organically produced in Switzerland.

== Versions of Giandor Chocolates ==
In the beginning, Frey Ag only launched its milk bar, in the early 90s they launched Giandor Dark, after that in 2000 they introduced Giandor White chocolate to chocolate lovers, and finally, Giandor Crunchy Almond.
