= MZP =

MZP may refer to:

- Péter Márki-Zay, Hungarian politician
- Mizo Zirlai Pawl, a student organization in Mizoram, India
- MZP 1, a variant of the Heckler & Koch HK69A1 grenade launcher
- Green Party of Hungary (Hungarian: Magyarországi Zöld Párt)
- Migros Zentralpackerei AG, a company that merged into the Swiss company Delica
- Mirzapur railway station, code of railway station on the Howrah-Delhi main line and Howrah-Allahabad-Mumbai line in India
- Motueka Aerodrome, IATA code of airport serving Motueka, New Zealand
- Movima language, ISO 639-3 language code
