= Birsfelden =

- Municipality
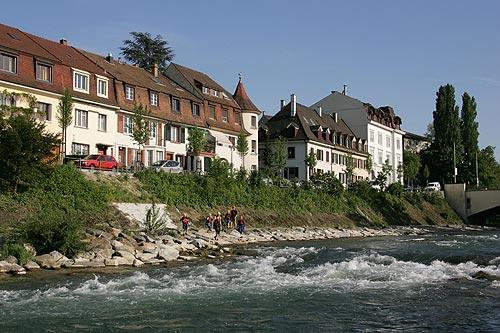

- Flag Coat of arms
- Location of Birsfelden
- Location within Switzerland Location within Canton of Basel-Landschaft
- Coordinates: 47.553333°N 7.62333333°E
- Country: Switzerland
- Canton: Basel-Landschaft
- District: Arlesheim

Area
  - Total: 2.52 km^{2} (0.97 sq mi)
- Elevation: 259 m (850 ft)

Population (June 2021)
  - Total: 10,447
  - Density: 4,150/km^{2} (10,700/sq mi)
- Time zone: UTC+01:00 (CET)
  - Summer (DST): UTC+02:00 (CEST)
- Postal code: 4127
- SFOS number: 2766
- ISO 3166 code: CH-BL
- Surrounded by: Basel (BS), Grenzach-Wyhlen (DE-BW), Muttenz, Riehen (BS)
- Twin towns: Plan-les-Ouates (Switzerland)
- Website: www.birsfelden.ch

Birsfelden (Swiss German: Birsfälde) is a municipality in the district of Arlesheim in the canton of Basel-Country in Switzerland.

== History ==
Birsfelden is first mentioned in 1274 as minor Rinvelden. Around 1500 it was first mentioned as Birsfeld.

== Geography ==
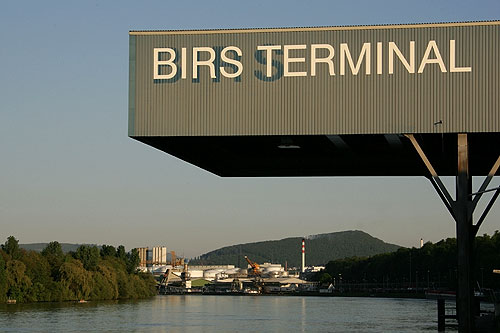
Birs harbor along the Rhine

Aerial view (1954)

Birsfelden has an area, as of 2009, of 2.52 square kilometers (0.97 sq mi). Of this area 0.04 km^{2} (0.015 sq mi) or 1.6% is forested. Of the rest of the land, 2.04 km^{2} (0.79 sq mi) or 81.0% is settled (buildings or roads), 0.46 km^{2} (0.18 sq mi) or 18.3% is either rivers or lakes.

Of the built up area, industrial buildings made up 21.0% of the total area while housing and buildings made up 26.6% and transportation infrastructure made up 13.9%. Power and water infrastructure as well as other special developed areas made up 4.0% of the area while parks, green belts and sports fields made up 15.5%. Out of the forested land, all of the forested land area is covered with heavy forests. Of the agricultural land, 0.0% is used for growing crops. All the water in the municipality is flowing water.

The municipality is located in the Arlesheim district, and is one of the suburbs of Basel. It is south of the Rhine River and on the right bank of the Birs River. It consists of the linear village of Birsfelden with a harbor and power plant on the Rhine. Until 1874, it was part of the municipality of Muttenz.

== Coat of arms ==
The blazon of the municipal coat of arms is Gules, three Mullets of Six Or, in chief a Barullet wavy Argent.

== Demographics ==
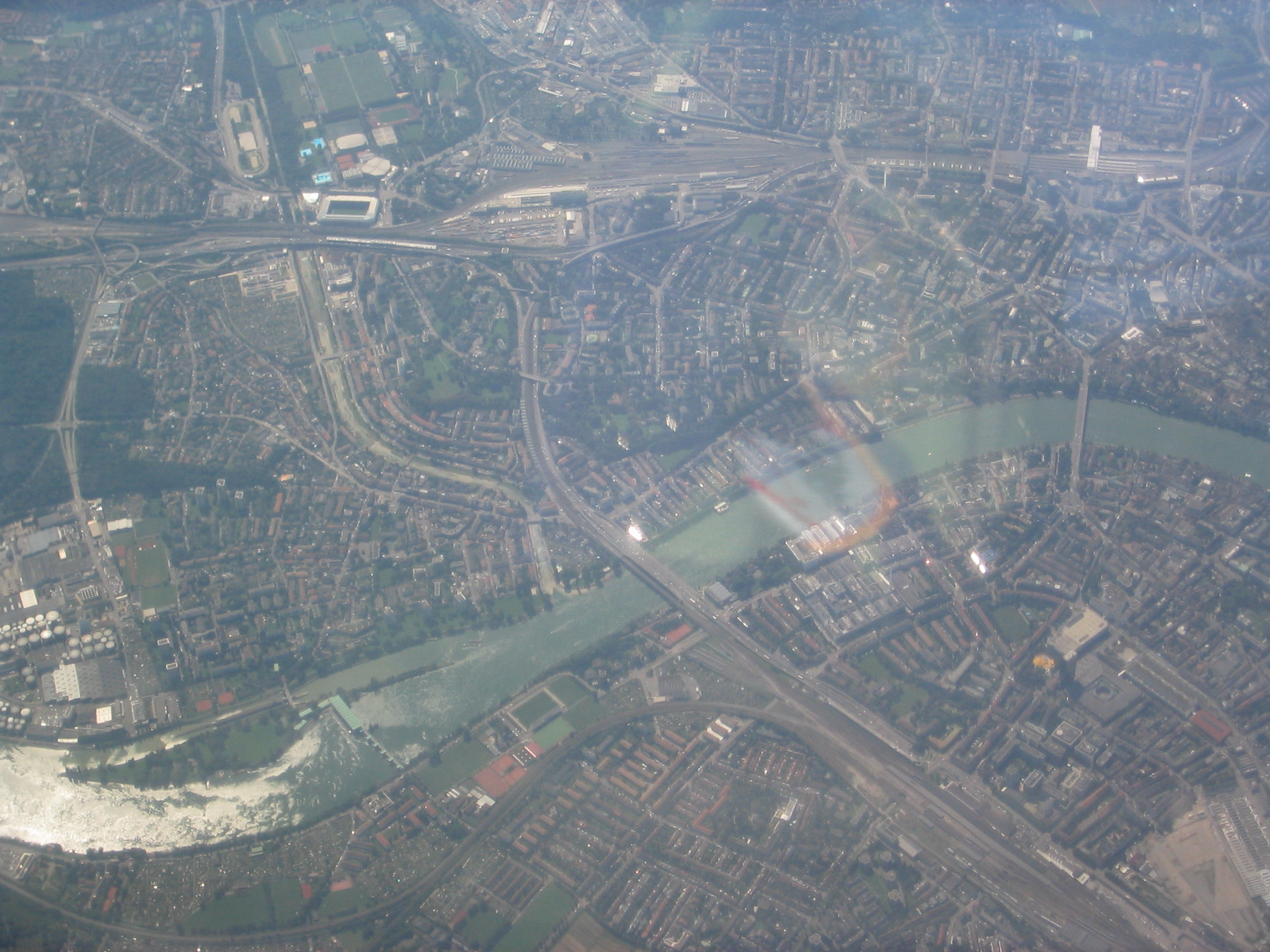
Aerial view of the Rhine at Basel, with Birsfelden in the lower left section.

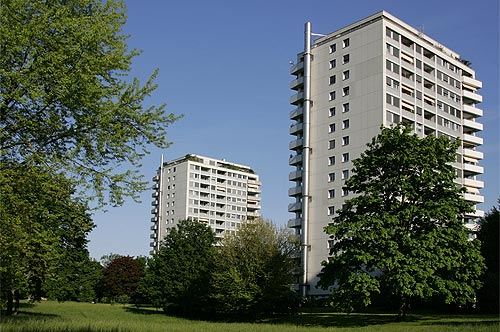
Rheinpark high-rise apartment complex

Birsfelden has a population (as of June 2021) of 10,447. As of 2008, 23.9% of the population are resident foreign nationals. Over the last 10 years (1997–2007) the population has changed at a rate of -4.4%.

Most of the population (as of 2000) speaks German (8,591 or 82.4%), with Italian language being second most common (617 or 5.9%) and French being third (217 or 2.1%). There are 9 people who speak Romansh.

As of 2008, the gender distribution of the population was 48.7% male and 51.3% female. The population was made up of 7,780 Swiss citizens (74.6% of the population), and 2,653 non-Swiss residents (25.4%) Of the population in the municipality 2,397 or about 23.0% were born in Birsfelden and lived there in 2000. There were 1,015 or 9.7% who were born in the same canton, while 4,013 or 38.5% were born somewhere else in Switzerland, and 2,598 or 24.9% were born outside of Switzerland.

In 2008 there were 71 live births to Swiss citizens and 36 births to non-Swiss citizens, and in same time span there were 100 deaths of Swiss citizens and 10 non-Swiss citizen deaths. Ignoring immigration and emigration, the population of Swiss citizens decreased by 29 while the foreign population increased by 26. There were 2 Swiss men who immigrated back to Switzerland and 1 Swiss woman who emigrated from Switzerland. At the same time, there were 68 non-Swiss men and 43 non-Swiss women who immigrated from another country to Switzerland. The total Swiss population change in 2008 (from all sources, including moves across municipal borders) was a decrease of 82 and the non-Swiss population change was an increase of 94 people. This represents a population growth rate of 0.1%.

The age distribution, as of 2010, in Birsfelden is; 570 children or 5.5% of the population are between 0 and 6 years old and 1,092 teenagers or 10.5% are between 7 and 19. Of the adult population, 1,278 people or 12.2% of the population are between 20 and 29 years old. 1,561 people or 15.0% are between 30 and 39, 1,571 people or 15.1% are between 40 and 49, and 1,863 people or 17.9% are between 50 and 64. The senior population distribution is 1,844 people or 17.7% of the population are between 65 and 79 years old and there are 654 people or 6.3% who are over 80. As of 2000, there were 3,822 people who were single and never married in the municipality.

There were 5,165 married individuals, 793 widows or widowers and 649 individuals who are divorced.

As of 2000, there were 5,136 private households in the municipality, and an average of 2.0 persons per household. There were 2,124 households that consist of only one person and 151 households with five or more people. Out of a total of 5,211 households that answered this question, 40.8% were households made up of just one person and 19 were adults who lived with their parents. Of the rest of the households, there are 1,650 married couples without children, 1,046 married couples with children There were 239 single parents with a child or children. There were 58 households that were made up unrelated people and 75 households that were made some sort of institution or another collective housing.

In 2000 there were 370 single-family homes (or 34.5% of the total) out of a total of 1,072 inhabited buildings. There were 519 multi-family buildings (48.4%), along with 111 multi-purpose buildings that were mostly used for housing (10.4%) and 72 other use buildings (commercial or industrial) that also had some housing (6.7%). Of the single-family homes 80 were built before 1919, while 18 were built between 1990 and 2000. The greatest number of single-family homes (162) were built between 1919 and 1945.

In 2000 there were 5,405 apartments in the municipality. The most common apartment size was 3 rooms of which there were 2,501. There were 262 single-room apartments and 466 apartments with five or more rooms. Of these apartments, a total of 5,057 apartments (93.6% of the total) were permanently occupied, while 239 apartments (4.4%) were seasonally occupied and 109 apartments (2.0%) were empty. As of 2007, the construction rate of new housing units was 2 new units per 1000 residents. As of 2000 the average price to rent a two-room apartment was about 793.00 CHF (US$630, £360, €510), a three-room apartment was about 944.00 CHF (US$760, £420, €600) and a four-room apartment cost an average of 1154.00 CHF (US$920, £520, €740). The vacancy rate for the municipality, in 2008, was 0.31%.

The historical population is given in the following chart:

== Heritage sites of national significance ==
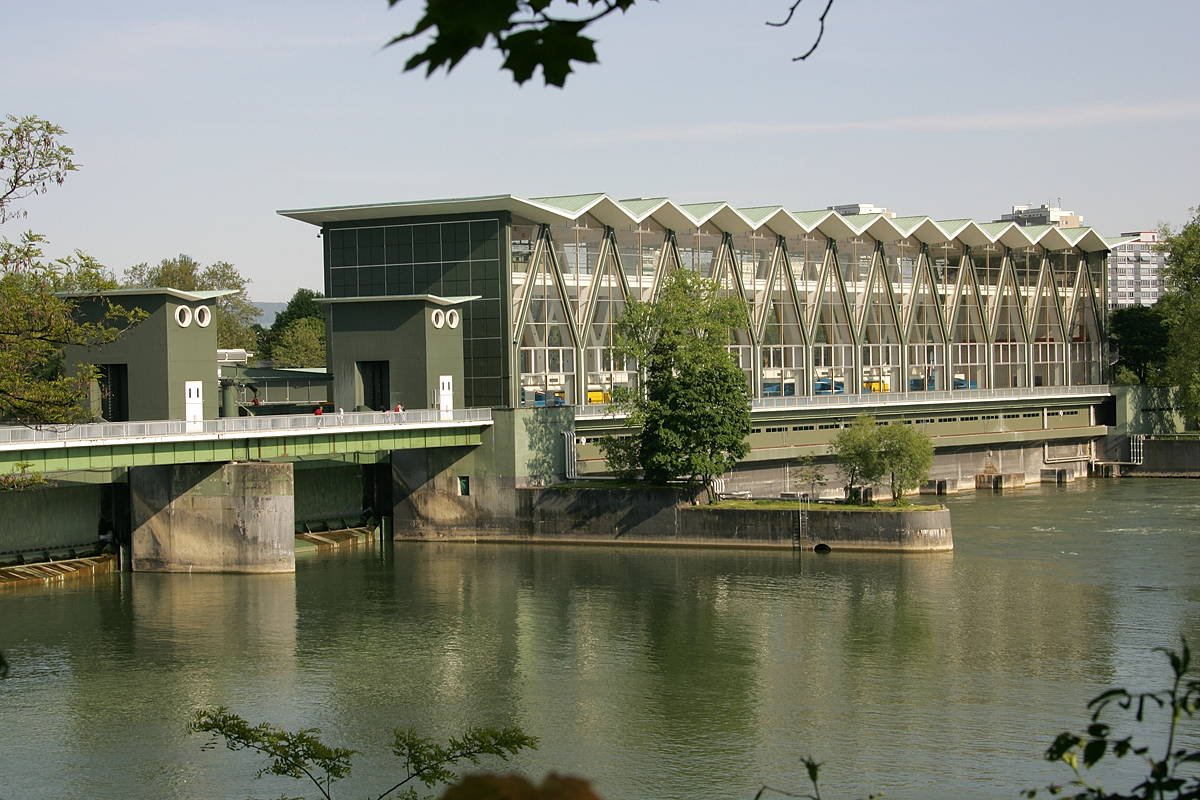
Powerplant Birsfelden

The power plant of Birsfelden, the Catholic Church of Bruder Klaus and the Sternenfeld (part of the Roman era rhine fortifications) are listed as Swiss heritage site of national significance.

== Politics ==
In the 2007 federal election the most popular party was the SP which received 33.88% of the vote. The next three most popular parties were the SVP (26.84%), the Green Party (12.53%) and the CVP (11.73%). In the federal election, a total of 3,071 votes were cast, and the voter turnout was 44.4%.

== Economy ==
As of 2007, Birsfelden had an unemployment rate of 2.87%. As of 2005, there were 4 people employed in the primary economic sector and about 2 businesses involved in this sector. 962 people were employed in the secondary sector and there were 65 businesses in this sector. 2,587 people were employed in the tertiary sector, with 269 businesses in this sector. There were 5,179 residents of the municipality who were employed in some capacity, of which females made up 44.9% of the workforce.

In 2008 the total number of full-time equivalent jobs was 3,412. The number of jobs in the primary sector was 5, of which were in agriculture and 5 were in forestry or lumber production. The number of jobs in the secondary sector was 1,358, of which 876 or (64.5%) were in manufacturing, 25 or (1.8%) were in mining and 404 (29.7%) were in construction. The number of jobs in the tertiary sector was 2,049. In the tertiary sector; 680 or 33.2% were in wholesale or retail sales or the repair of motor vehicles, 402 or 19.6% were in the movement and storage of goods, 80 or 3.9% were in a hotel or restaurant, 58 or 2.8% were in the information industry, 28 or 1.4% were the insurance or financial industry, 172 or 8.4% were technical professionals or scientists, 89 or 4.3% were in education and 266 or 13.0% were in health care.

In 2000, there were 3,846 workers who commuted into the municipality and 4,148 workers who commuted away. The municipality is a net exporter of workers, with about 1.1 workers leaving the municipality for every one entering. About 21.3% of the workforce coming into Birsfelden are coming from outside Switzerland, while 0.3% of the locals commute out of Switzerland for work. Of the working population, 39.1% used public transportation to get to work, and 25.6% used a private car.

Delica AG, part of the Migros group was established in Birsfelden in 1954. In 2009 it employed 273 people and in 2011 it had an annual turnover of 247.3 million CHF.

== Religion ==
From the 2000 census, 3,631 or 34.8% were Roman Catholic, while 3,287 or 31.5% belonged to the Swiss Reformed Church. Of the rest of the population, there were 174 members of an Orthodox church (or about 1.67% of the population), there were 23 individuals (or about 0.22% of the population) who belonged to the Christian Catholic Church, and there were 366 individuals (or about 3.51% of the population) who belonged to another Christian church. There were 9 individuals (or about 0.09% of the population) who were Jewish, and 455 (or about 4.36% of the population) who were Islamic. There were 43 individuals who were Buddhist, 137 individuals who were Hindu and 17 individuals who belonged to another church. 1,863 (or about 17.86% of the population) belonged to no church, are agnostic or atheist, and 424 individuals (or about 4.07% of the population) did not answer the question.

== Education ==
In Birsfelden about 4,379 or (42.0%) of the population have completed non-mandatory upper secondary education, and 1,058 or (10.1%) have completed additional higher education (either university or a Fachhochschule). Of the 1,058 who completed tertiary schooling, 57.6% were Swiss men, 23.6% were Swiss women, 11.7% were non-Swiss men and 7.1% were non-Swiss women. As of 2000, there were 17 students in Birsfelden who came from another municipality, while 323 residents attended schools outside the municipality.

== Notable people ==
- Otto Frank (1889 – 1980 in Birsfelden) businessman, father of Anne Frank
- Walter Müller (1920 in Birsfelden – 2010 in Birsfelden) a Swiss football goalkeeper
- Karl Engel (1923 in Birsfelden - 2006) a Swiss classical pianist, recorded the complete piano music of Mozart and of Robert Schumann
- Patrick Streiff (born 1955 in Birsfelden) bishop of the United Methodist Church of Central and Southern Europe
- Roland Dalhäuser (born 1958 in Birsfelden) a retired high jumper, competed in the 1984 Summer Olympics
- Andreas Meyer (born 1961) Chairman of Swiss Federal Railways (SBB) since 2007, brought up in Birsfelden
