= Patrick Streiff =

Swiss Methodist bishop

Patrick Philipp Streiff (born July 8, 1955 in Birsfelden, Switzerland) is bishop of the United Methodist Church of Central and Southern Europe which comprises the countries Albania, Algeria, Austria, Bulgaria, Czech Republic, Croatia, France, Hungary, Macedonia, Poland, Serbia and Montenegro, Slovakia, Switzerland, and Tunisia.

== Life ==
Patrick Streiff made the schools in Birsfelden and Muttenz. From 1975 to 1979 he studied at the theological seminary of the United Methodist Church in Reutlingen (Germany) and from 1979 to 1983 at the University of Bern (Switzerland).

In 1979 he married Heidi Albrecht, with whom he has four children, Rahel, Corinne, Manuel and Myriam.

Patrick Streiff was ordained elder (pastor) of the United Methodist Church in 1984. He served as pastor in Lausanne-Vevey, Neuchâtel and Biel.

From 1988 he was director of the Centre Méthodiste de Formation Théologique in Lausanne and from 1992 professor of modern Christian history.

In 2005, Patrick Streiff was elected bishop of the United Methodist Church in Central and Southern Europe. He is the successor of Heinrich Bolleter has assumed his office on 1 May 2006.

Beside his service as pastor and professor, Patrick Streiff is also president of the European Section of the "World Methodist Historical Society" and works as consultant in establishing a theological education in French speaking countries of Africa and in Cambodia.

== Works ==
- Reluctant Saint? A Theological Biography of Fletcher of Madeley, Epworth Press 2001, ISBN 0-7162-0546-7
- Methodism in Europe in the 19th and 20th century, Eesti Metodist Kirik, 2003, ISBN 9985-9129-1-8
- Der Methodismus in Europa im 19. und 20. Jahrhundert, EmK-Geschichte, Monografien, Band 50, 2003, ISBN 3-89725-029-2

== See also ==
- List of bishops of the United Methodist Church
