= Denner (supermarket) =

Swiss supermarket chain

- Type: Aktiengesellschaft
- Founded: 1860 (predecessor company); 1969 (Denner AG)
- Founder: Heinrich Reiff-Schwarz
- Headquarters: Zurich, Switzerland
- Key people: Michel Gruber (President of board of directors); Torsten Friedrich (CEO)
- Revenue: 3.9 billion CHF (2024)
- Owner: Federation of Migros Cooperatives (since 2007)
- Number of employees: 6,526(2024)

Denner is a discount supermarket chain in Switzerland. It is Switzerland's third-largest supermarket chain after Migros and Coop with 11.4% market share. It has been owned by the Federation of Migros Cooperatives since 2007.

As of 2022, Denner has 860 stores (591 own stores and 269 running as franchise called Denner Partner) and a revenue of 3.7 billion CHF. Denner is the second largest wine-seller in Switzerland. In 2024, Denner generated net sales of approximately 3.9 billion Swiss francs. The company is led by CEO Torsten Friedrich. Founded in Zollikon in 1860, the company is headquartered in Zurich.

The first predecessor company of today's Denner Group was called "Reiff-Schwarz, Mercerie und Spezereihandel," which subsequently operated branches primarily in the upper Lake Zurich region, the Zürcher Oberland, and the Canton of Glarus. Over the course of time, the company was renamed several times, it was converted into a public limited stock company in 1935, and received its current name, Denner AG, in 1969 under the leadership of lawyer and sole owner Karl Schweri.

== Corporate structure ==
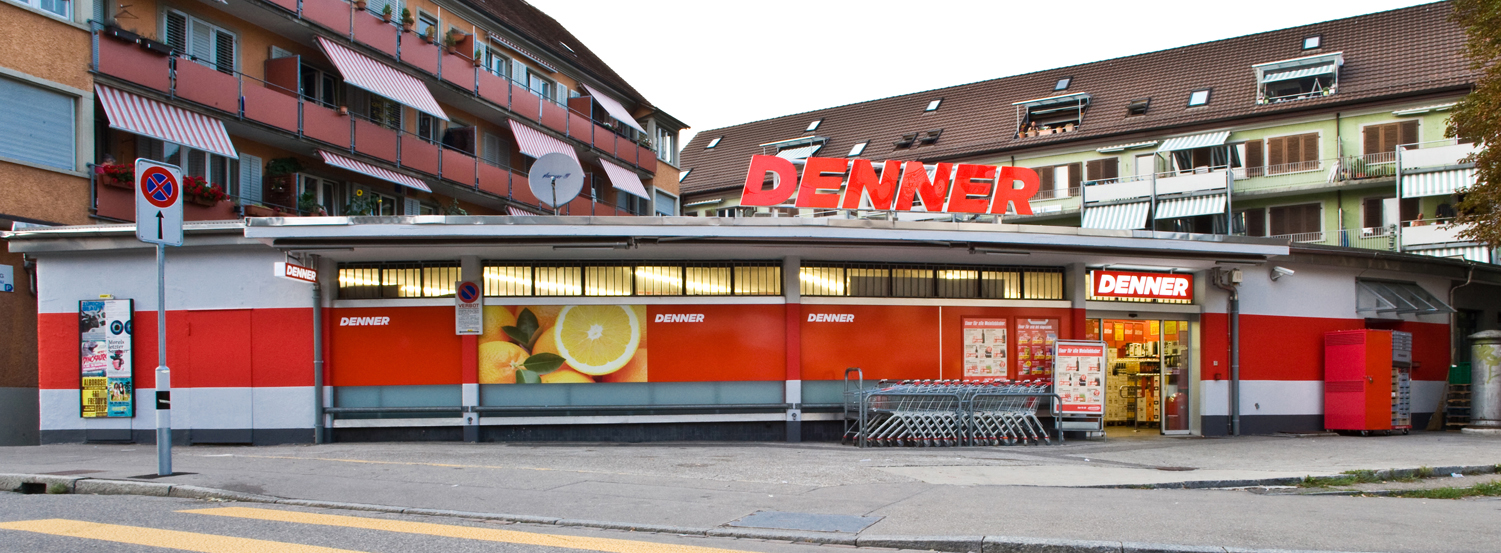
Discount store of the Denner AG in Zurich

=== Range and locations ===
Denner is a discount supermarket with a range of around 1,900 everyday items. At the turn of the millennium, Denner was the first in Switzerland to use extended shelf life (ESL) milk. In 2016, the range was supplemented by IP Suisse products. In 2019, organic foods were added to the range with the Rossmann brand enerBiO. In October 2022, Denner added milk from Bio Suisse to its range.

Since 2019, the discounter has increasingly relied on pre-baked goods, which are baked in the branches before being sold. Denner tried to achieve low sales prices in Switzerland with the use of parallel imports. The company has distribution centers in Mägenwil in Aargau, Frauenfeld in Thurgau, Schmitten in Freiburg, Lyss in Bern, and Dietlikon in Zurich. Some of those branches also have a Swiss Post agency.

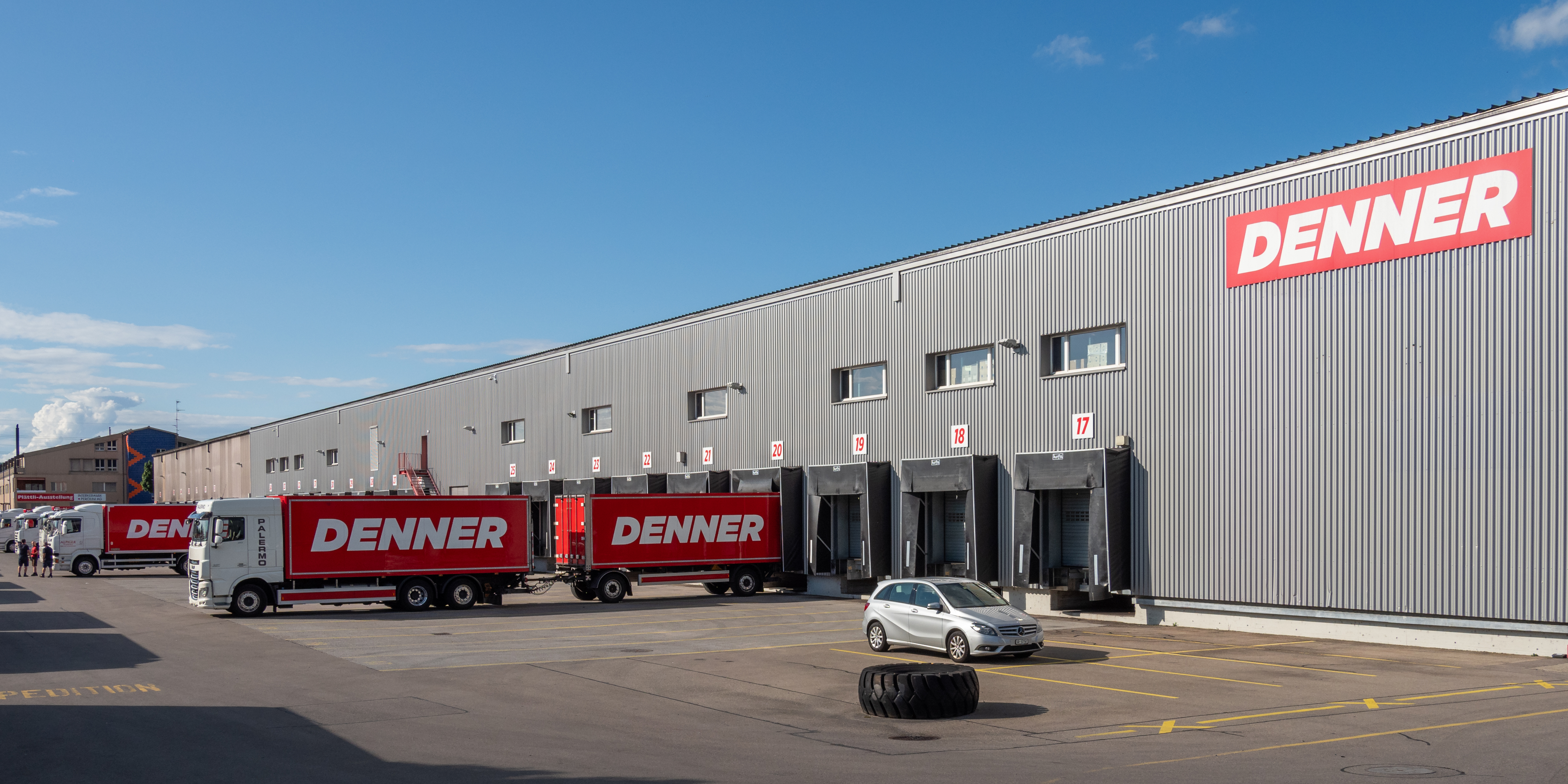
Distribution center in Frauenfeld

=== Corporate Management ===
==== Board of Directors ====
The Board of Directors of Denner AG currently consists of five members:

- Michel Gruber (chairman; also Head of the Retail Department at MGB)
- Christian Biland (Vice Chairman)
- Christine Rittner-Koch (Member)
- Isabelle Zimmermann (Member; also Head of the Finance Department at MGB)
- Anita Weckherlin (Member; also chairwoman of the executive board of the Migros Basel Cooperative)

==== Executive Management ====
The Executive Management of Denner AG currently consists of seven members:

- Torsten Friedrich (CEO)
- Roger Meier (Finance)
- Serge Gafner (Human Resources)
- Stefan Eberhard (Purchasing, ad interim)
- Thomas Rossel (Logistics)
- Christian Staub (Sales)
- Daniel Heinzmann (IT)

== History ==
=== Beginning ===
Heinrich Reiff-Schwarz from Greifensee founded the company "Reiff-Schwarz, Mercerie and Spezereihandel" in Zollikon near Zurich in 1860. It was started in 1860 and later developed by Karl Schweri. In 1863 Jakob Pfister became part owner. When Heinrich Reiff-Schwarz died in 1870, his widow Dorothea Reiff-Schwarz joined the business, which had colonial goods branches mainly in the area of upper Lake Zurich, the Zurich Oberland and in the canton of Glarus. After Dorothea Reiff-Schwarz's death in 1881, her son-in-law Julius Caesar Denner from Biel became a partner. In 1888 the company was renamed "Denner-Reiff & Cie. Consumgesellschaft" in Zurich (owners were Caesar Denner and his cousin Carl Denner) and separated into "Pfister & Co., Consumgesellschaft" on Flössergasse in Zurich (owners were Jakob and Barbara Pfister-Maag).

After Caesar Denner's death in 1914, his son Hans Denner took over management and the company was now called "Denner & Co. Consumgesellschaft". Competition from Migros, which was founded in 1925, the global economic crisis at the end of the 1920s and poor business performance forced Hans Denner to convert the company into a stock corporation in 1935. In the same year the company moved to their current location on Grubenstrasse in Zurich and was given the name "Consum AG. Denner & Co."

=== Schweri era ===
The holding company "Aarauer Handelsgesellschaft AG" (AHG) was founded on 30 May 1944. Karl Schweri (1917–2001) was Vice President of the board of directors. On the same day, the operating company "Import- und Grosshandels AG" (IGA) was founded in Sarnen with a branch in Zurich. The two companies took over "Consum AG" on 13 March 1947 along with "Denner & Co.", "Consum Bär-Pfister & Co. AG", "Domicilium AG" and "Kaufhausgenossenschaft". On 22 July 1947, Schweri was excluded from the activities of AHG and IGA due to internal conflicts with other major shareholders who were also suppliers to IGA and supplied them at overpriced prices. During a five-year power struggle, Schweri secretly acquired shares in IGA, eventually becoming the majority shareholder in 1951 and expelling his former partners. In 1958, 40 "Sommer AG Bern" stores were purchased and integrated into "Denner Grocery AG Bern". The first Denner Supermarkt opened in Zurich-Schwamendingen in 1962.

The system of fixed retail prices for food and luxury foods fell on 2 February 1967 and after lengthy disputes between the IGA, the branded goods industry and its association Promarca, the first food and beverage discounter was opened in Zurich-Altstetten on 24 October 1967. This was the first time that the discount business model was introduced in Switzerland. A year-long battle against the tobacco cartel began with a referendum against a new tobacco tax law. The law, which was put to the vote in the referendum held on 7 February 1968, was rejected on 19 May 1968 with a voter turnout of 36.9 percent and 48.2 percent in favour. In 1969, the IGA was transformed into Denner AG.

In the fall of 1969, Denner announced it would sell a bottle of lager for 50 centimes in the future. As a result, all Swiss breweries that belonged to the beer brewers' association boycotted orders for lager beer in 60 cl bottles. Up to this point, Denner had purchased the 60 cl bottle of lager beer from his suppliers Hürlimann and Löwenbräu Zurich for 46 centimes net. The Swiss beer cartel set the minimum sales price at 70 centimes. The boycott was followed several different legal proceedings. On 28 November 1972, the Federal Court ruled that the boycott was legal. From autumn 1980, cartel members began supplying branded beer again after Denner had committed to complying with the minimum price set at the time of one franc. With effect from 1 November 1981, the beer brewers' association increased the so-called intervention price to CHF 1.10. Denner refused to comply with this increase and continued to sell the 58 cl returnable bottle of lager at Fr. 1.00, which was followed by another delivery ban. Denner demanded that the boycott be revoked as a precautionary measure. A constitutional complaint to the Federal Court was dismissed on 20 July 1982. Beginning in November 1982, a series of lawsuits, counter suits and proceedings surrounding the boycott and claims placed in advertising followed. On 6 May 1986, the Federal Supreme Court overturned a judgment of the Commercial Court of the Canton of Zurich dated 16 November 1984 with reference to the main lawsuit and referred the matter back to the lower court for a new decision. The legal dispute ended finally in 1993 with Denner's victory.

After a 20-year legal battle, Schweri forced the end of fixed prices for tobacco in 1996. During the legal battle, Denner distributed coupons for tobacco products that were promised to be paid out once the fixed prices were abolished. In 1971, a distribution centre was opened in Toffen, Bern, and two years later another in Mägenwil, after which the Altstetten distribution centre became obsolete. Schweri expanded the management structures in 1972 and appointed a corporate board team. The press officer Helga Hnidek (the wife of city councilor Ernst Bieri) was the first woman appointed as director by a Swiss company, right in the midst of the Swiss women's movement. Four years later, he promoted her to CEO.

In 1973, the company expanded internationally under the name Denner Handelsgesellschaft mbH Wien (Denner Trading Company Ltd. Vienna), which it sold again in 1978.

=== Denner Satellit and growth ===
In 1977, the first "Denner Satellit" was opened in Endingen, Aargau; "Denner satellites" are stores operated by legally and financially independent retailers, which are located primarily in rural areas and carry part of the Denner range at Denner prices as well as additional product lines. Denner founded the "Konsumenten-Ombudsmann" foundation in 1977 with initial capital of half a million Swiss francs. Former National Councillor Franz Josef Kurmann headed this politically neutral and economically independent ombudsman office, which was intended to protect consumer interests, free from any influence.

In 1984 Denner acquired the largest toy retail chain in Switzerland, the Franz Carl Weber trading group. In 1982, Denner's sales exceeded one billion Swiss francs for the first time. In 1993 Denner acquired "Mothercare Switzerland AG" with 15 stores. The chain, which specialized in baby items and maternity clothing, was renamed "Babycare AG" and was sold to Takomi SA in 2001. In 1994, Denner took over the Waro retail chain, which was sold to Coop at the end of 2002. The seven optics branches in Zurich, Basel and Frauenfeld were sold in February 1996 to Zürcher Kochoptik AG, which belongs to the Jelmoli Holding, because Denner wanted to concentrate on the discount, Waro and Franz Carl Weber areas.

In 1988/1989 Denner supported the referendum against the new viticulture decree, which would set wine import quotas for another 10 years. The law came to a vote on 1 April 1990 and was rejected by 46.7 percent, with a vote turnout of 40.8 percent. Denner launched three popular initiatives in 1997: the Federal People's Initiative "for accelerating direct democracy (processing deadlines for popular initiatives in the form of a detailed draft)", the Federal People's Initiative "for lower hospital costs", and the Federal People's Initiative "for lower drug prices". All initiatives were rejected.

On 1 August 1998, Philippe Gaydoul, Schweri's then 26-year-old grandson, became CEO of Denner AG, changed Denner's strategy and began selling more branded items again. The group was also reorganised: from this point on, the strategic management of Denner, Waro and Franz Carl Weber was with Rast Holding. In the same year, Denner took over 49 of 60 stores in the loss-making Billi-Top discount chain from the Zurich AG, which is part of the Coop Group. At the end of 2000, Philippe Gaydoul also took over as President of the holding company from his grandfather Karl Schweri after his death. Mario Bonorand replaced Philippe Gaydoul as president of Rast Holding in 2002, but Gaydoul remained managing director of Denner AG. In 2002, Denner began modernizing its branches, and the first pilot branch was opened in Zurich on 27 February of the same year. The appearance of the more than 300 Denner branches was renewed from 2003 to the end of 2004 under the motto "New Denner". In 2004, the sales of its 580 outlets exceeded CHF 1.8 billion.

In 2005 Denner acquired its rival discount chain Pick Pay from the German Rewe Group for 56 million francs; the Competition Commission approved the takeover on 14 October 2005 without any conditions. The 146 Pick Pay branches and the logistics centre in Egerkingen were taken over and the "Pick Pay" brand was discontinued. "Pick Pay Reisen" became "Denner Reisen" at the beginning of 2006. Franz Carl Weber's remaining branches were sold to the French Ludendo Group in 2006. In November 2006, Denner opened the first "D-Vino wine bar" in Seefeld, Zurich, which offered over 200 different wines. The selection was expanded with locations on Bahnhofstrasse and Limmatplatz. Denner sold the three wine bars in July 2009 to "D-Vino Weinbars AG", which kept the concept.

In 2006, Denner founded the Swiss Retail Interest Group (IG DHS) with five other Swiss companies (Charles Voegele, Coop, Manor, Migros and Valora).

=== Takeover by Migros ===
on 12 January 2007, it was announced that Migros has purchased a majority stake in Denner. Migros would take over 70 percent of Denner's share capital, the other 30 percent remained owned by Gaydoul's family holding company, and Denner continued to be an autonomously managed business entity with the previous managing director Philippe Gaydoul. The Competition Commission (COMCO) examined the matter and seven legal reports were prepared - five on behalf of COMCO and two at the request of Migros. On 3 September 2007, the COMCO approved the acquisition with conditions for seven years in order to limit the negative effects of the merger. At the end of 2007, Denner launched "Primess", a range of private-label products in the premium segment. In 2013, the Primess line disappeared from the permanent range and was relaunched in 2014 as a seasonal holiday line. On 30 November 2009, the Competition Commission upheld a complaint filed by Denner in 2005: In order to avoid price agreements, Denner was allowed to procure the GABA Group's products (e.g. Elmex) where they were cheapest.

In December 2010, Denner was the first Swiss retailer to offer coffee capsules that were compatible with Nespresso machines. On 10 January 2011, the companies Société des Produits Nestlé SA in Vevey and Nestlé Nespresso SA in Lausanne obtained a preliminary injunction on sales at the commercial court of the canton of St. Gallen, with objections primarily to the shape of the capsule and the slogan. The preliminary injunction measures were lifted in March 2011 by the President of the St. Gallen Commercial Court because it was shown that the shape of the capsule was technically necessary. Nestlé and Nespresso appealed to the Federal Supreme Court against the St. Gallen Commercial Court's decision on measures, which was partially approved on 28 June 2011. The Federal Supreme Court held that the lower court – the St. Gallen Commercial Court – could decide on the sales ban. Denner filed a request to lift the temporary sales ban, whereupon the St. Gallen Commercial Court lifted the temporary sales ban of 22 July 2011. In May 2012, Denner was awarded the Prix K-Tipp by the Swiss consumer magazine K-Tipp for the most customer-friendly campaign of the year with regard to the coffee capsule dispute. The legal dispute was finally decided in Denner's favour by the St. Gallen Commercial Court in 2013.

At the end of 2009, Gaydoul Holding's ownership share (30 percent) was transferred to Migros, which now owns 100 percent of Denner AG. Also at the end of the year, Philippe Gaydoul handed over operational management of Denner AG to Peter Bamert, the former CEO of Ex Libris. In January 2011, Peter Bamert handed over management to the previous CFO Mario Irminger, and in March 2012 Philippe Gaydoul resigned as chairman of the board of directors. He was succeeded by Oswald Kessler. Mario Irminger resigned as CEO of Denner at the end of April 2023, as he became CEO of the Migros Cooperative Association in May 2023. The finance director Adrian Bodmer took over Irminger's position on an interim basis. At the beginning of 2025, Torsten Friedrich, former CEO of Lidl Switzerland, was elected as Irminger's successor.

Since 2014, Denner has been allowed to receive supplies from Migros Industrie without restrictions. In the same year it was decided to revise the appearance and range of the Denner stores. By the end of 2016, all Denner-owned stored were remodelled. Following the remodelling of the Denner-owned stores, the strategic realignment of the "Denner Satellites" followed and at the same time their renaming to "Denner Partner".

Denner Reisen was discontinued in 2014. In June 2024, the Federation of Migros Cooperatives announced that Migros, Denner, Migrolino, and Migros Online would centralize parts of their procurement. To supply western Switzerland more efficiently and relieve the distribution center in Schmitten, in the canton of Fribourg, a new distribution center would be built in Aclens, in the canton of Vaud. The foundation stone was laid in September 2024, and it is expected to be operational by 2027.

After the entrance of the worldwide-known retailers Aldi and Lidl (2004 and 2009), Denner successfully defended its leading role in the discount category.

"One for all" ("Einer für Alle") is the company claim, as it describes itself as the "Retail's Robin Hood", who is fighting for cheaper prices for the customers.

At the end of 2016, the leading Swiss discounter Denner had 510 of its own discounter branches in all four language regions of Switzerland and in the Principality of Liechtenstein, as well as independent retailers who are supplied by the company Denner and operate under the names Denner Satellit and "Denner Partner" (279 branches). 20 locations are also operated in the franchise model as Denner Express or Denner partners. At the end of 2017, Denner had 811 points of sale. With over 300 wines in its range, Denner is the second-largest wine retailer in Switzerland after Coop. At the end of 2018, Denner employed a total of 5,075 people and 105 apprentices. Net sales in 2016 were 2.97 billion Swiss francs and 138.3 million purchases were registered. At the end of 2018, Denner had 817 branches.
