= Hans A. Pestalozzi =

Hans Adolf Pestalozzi (February 7, 1929 – July 14, 2004) was a Swiss social critic of late 20th century capitalism, which eventually led to his becoming a bestselling author (Nach uns die Zukunft, Auf die Bäume ihr Affen).

== Biography ==
Pestalozzi was born in Zürich. After his university education at University of St. Gallen, he started working for Migros. In the 1960s he also built up the Gottlieb Duttweiler Institut, a think tank named after the Migros founder (who had died in 1962). The institute was established to investigate the range of possible shortcomings and negative effects of capitalism, in particular within Western consumer society, so that they could be combated more effectively.

Pestalozzi fulfilled that task very thoroughly, especially in his lectures, so much so that in 1977 he was fired by Migros. Rather than looking for a new job, he became a freelance writer and self-proclaimed "autonomous agitator" who sided with the fledgling European youth, peace and ecological movements. He preached "positive subversion" and, in a Kantian manner, tried to convince people that using their own intelligence was the right thing to do. Moreover, he demanded a guaranteed minimum income for everybody.

Hans A. Pestalozzi died a recluse by suicide in his home near Wattwil, Canton of St. Gallen.
