= Heinrich Bolleter =

Swiss bishop

Heinrich Bolleter (born May 13, 1941, Zürich, Switzerland) was from 1989 to 2006 the bishop of the United Methodist Church of Central and Southern Europe which comprises the countries Albania, Algeria, Austria, Bulgaria, Croatia, Czech Republic, France, Hungary, Macedonia, Poland, Serbia and Montenegro, Slovakia, Switzerland, and Tunisia.

== Life ==
Heinrich Bolleter grew up in Zürich. Having been engaged in the youth work of the Methodist Church in Zürich-Oerlikon, he decided to embrace church service. He studied from 1962 to 1965 at the theological seminary of the then Methodist Episcopal Church (Bischöfliche Methodistenkirche) in Frankfurt (Germany), with special studies in individual psychology and journalism.

1966 he married Martha Zellweger with whom he has three children, Harald Bolleter, Muriel Guntelach and Yvonne Rüegger.

1969 he was ordained elder of the United Methodist Church. He served as pastor in Baden, Zürich, Thalwil and Zofingen. During his time in Thalwil, he was also editor of the Methodist journal Kirche + Welt where he professed an open church in the tradition of Methodism.

1989 Heinrich Bolleter was elected Bishop of the United Methodist Church of Central and Southern Europe, where he has to take care of 14 countries in Europe and Northern Africa. He was the successor of Franz Werner Schaefer and the third European bishop in the Methodist Church of Central and Southern Europe.

Heinrich Bolleter saw himself always as a mediator between Evangelical tendencies of the small churches and the ecumenism of the big churches and showed this again and again by his engagement in inter-church relationships. He served as president of the Evangelical Association of Swiss Evangelical Free Churches and of the ecumenical Working Group of Christian Churches in Switzerland.

On May 1, 2006 Heinrich Bolleter retired from his bishop's office. His successor is Patrick Streiff. Bolleter is Geneva secretary of the World Methodist Council.

== See also ==
- List of bishops of the United Methodist Church
