= List of supermarket chains in Switzerland =

This is a list of supermarket chains in Switzerland.

Supermarket	Founded/Came to Switzerland	Owned by	Information
Aldi	2005	Aldi	
Coop	1893	Coop	Second largest
Crai	1973	Crai	Only in Ticino
Denner	1881	Federation of Migros Cooperatives (since 2007)	Third largest
Lidl	2009	Lidl	
Manor	1902	Maus Frères SA	
Migros	1925	Federation of Migros Cooperatives	Largest
Spar	1989	Spar	
Volg	1886	Volg	

== See also ==
- List of supermarket chains

== Bibliography ==
- (in French) Marc Benoun, Le commerce de détail suisse , collection « Le savoir suisse », Presses polytechniques et universitaires romandes, 2015 (ISBN 9782889151462).
