= Chocolat Frey =

Swiss food manufacturer

Chocolat Frey AG

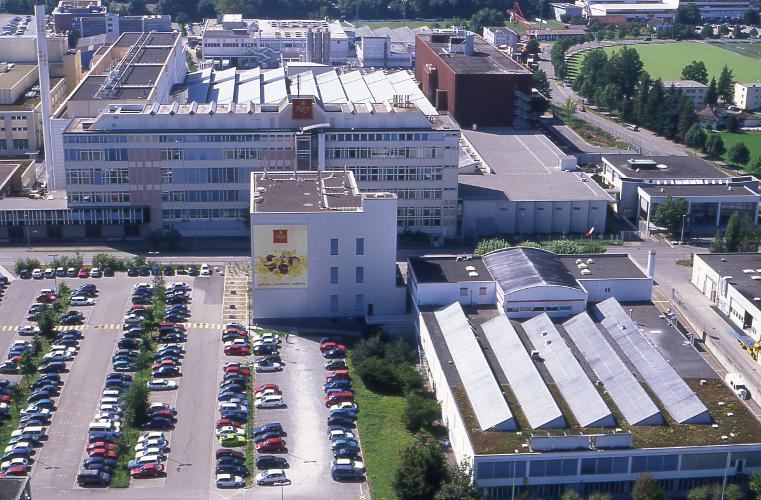
- Frey Headquarters in Buchs, Aargau
- Type: Subsidiary
- Industry: Food
- Founded: 1887; 139 years ago
- Headquarters: Buchs, Switzerland
- Key people: Hans-Ruedi Christen (CEO)
- Revenue: CHF 396 million (2015)
- Number of employees: 1017 (2015)
- Parent: Migros
- Website: chocolatfrey.com

Chocolat Frey AG, commonly Frey, based in Buchs in the Swiss Canton of Aargau, manufactures chocolate and chewing gum. The products of the leading chocolate manufacturer on the Swiss chocolate market are sold both in Switzerland and abroad under the brand name of Frey as well as additional private labels. The company, founded in 1887, is a business enterprise of the M-Industry and has been a part of the Migros Group since 1950.

Frey is both renowned for its original products and for its imitations of other well-known products, notably the Branche, Toblerone and Ragusa bars.

The products were primarily manufactured for the Migros cooperatives and sold in their branches. In addition, catering establishments, bulk consumers and the processing industry were also supplied. Exports accounted for more than a third of sales.

The Migros industrial companies Delica, Midor, Riseria Taverne and Totale Capsule Solutions merged with Chocolat Frey to form the new Delica AG on June 1, 2021. Since the merger, "Chocolat Frey" has been a Delica AG brand.

== History ==
=== Establishment ===
Early advertisement for Frey (1892)

Frey was founded in 1887 by the brothers Robert (31 December 1861 – 3 March 1940) and Max Frey (9 March 1863 – 17 December 1933). Both had already gained experience with the manufacture of chocolate before establishing the family business. After his training as a commercial employee with the company S.A. de la Fabrique des Chocolats Amédée Kohler et fils in Lausanne, Robert dealt with machines for the manufacture of chocolate in the engineering works Riccard & Greiss in Paris. Max completed his commercial apprenticeship with the company Cramer-Frey in Zurich, for which he was eventually also active in Brazil. On 17 December 1887, they founded the general partnership R. & M. Frey in Aarau. The first factory was on the Balänenweg in their parents' house in Aarau. From 1900, a former cotton mill in the Telli section became the main production facility.

The development of the conche in 1879 advanced the industrial production of chocolate greatly. Robert was already familiar with this technique and he was able to integrate it in his company. Furthermore, from the very beginning production was carried out by electric machines. The invention of milk chocolate by Daniel Peter in 1875, allowing the use of more local resources, also favored the establishment of Frey. The importance of cocoa was diminished with the use of less expensive ingredients such as milk, nuts and dried fruits.

=== First half of the 20th century ===
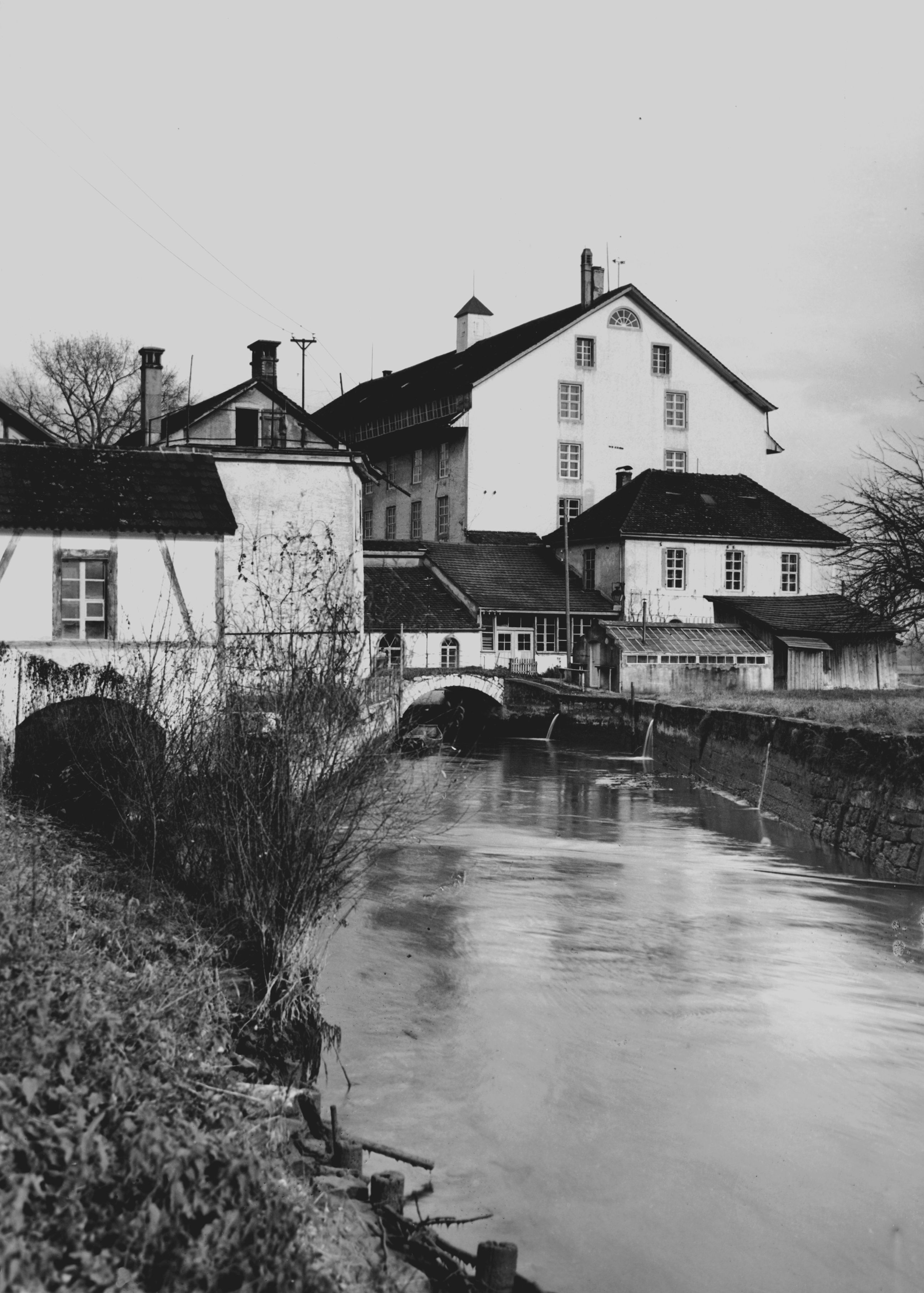
The former factory in Telli with the canal and power plant, pictured in the 1930s

Beginning in 1900, R. & M. Frey produced in the Telli neighbourhood of Aarau. They acquired the former cotton mill there that was built in 1836/37 by Friedrich Frey-Herosé, who later became a federal councillor. In 1906 the firm decided to become a public company. From then on they manufactured chocolate bars and chocolate powder, but also soups and tonics. However, the latter were removed from the range of products later to focus on the manufacture of chocolate.

During the First World War the company benefited from Switzerland's neutral position. Open customs facilitated the export of chocolate. However, the procurement of raw materials such as cocoa proved to be much more difficult. As a result of good sales prices abroad, business interruptions could be prevented. Through export, turnover could even be almost doubled, from 882,000 Swiss francs (CHF) (1916) to CHF 1,465,000 (1918). Back then the chocolate was available in Germany, France and Sweden, and later on also in England. With the end of the war exports slumped severely. Germany and France were too preoccupied with the reconstruction and were no longer trading partners, leaving only England. This forced the company to downgrade sales to the domestic market. At the beginning of the 1920s, the company teetered on the brink of collapse. Production stood still for days at a time. It was not until the economy recovered around the mid-1920s, that the board of directors took heart to develop the foreign market again. However, this attempt failed due to the global economic crisis. During these years Robert Frey junior (born February 18, 1901) gradually took over the company management. His father had already familiarised him with the company early on. This way he was able to ensure that the public company remained family-owned. In 1932 Robert Frey senior retired from the board of directors. Only one year later his brother Max Frey died aged 70.

The company also had a tough struggle during the Second World War. Foreign trade was complicated by the war. New import regulations for cocoa and sugar limited the Swiss chocolate market a great deal. Furthermore, many employees as well as executives were called up for military service, so that the company lacked sufficient personnel to advance. Although demand increased slightly after the end of the war, it could not be met due to the lack of manpower.

Thanks to the distinctive economic upswing at the end of the Second World War, the company's situation improved. In 1946 for the first time the board of directors came up with the idea of looking around for partners. Four years later Migros took over the company. Frey is the oldest acquired company of Migros. Initially the alliance appeared to be debatable, as until then Migros owned its own chocolate factory with Jonatal AG. However, for Frey the signing of the agreement was an important decision. Although the chocolate factory had to adopt the new owner's terms and conditions, the company management remained in the hands of Robert Frey junior. In addition, the company's development was promoted.

=== Second half of the 20th century ===
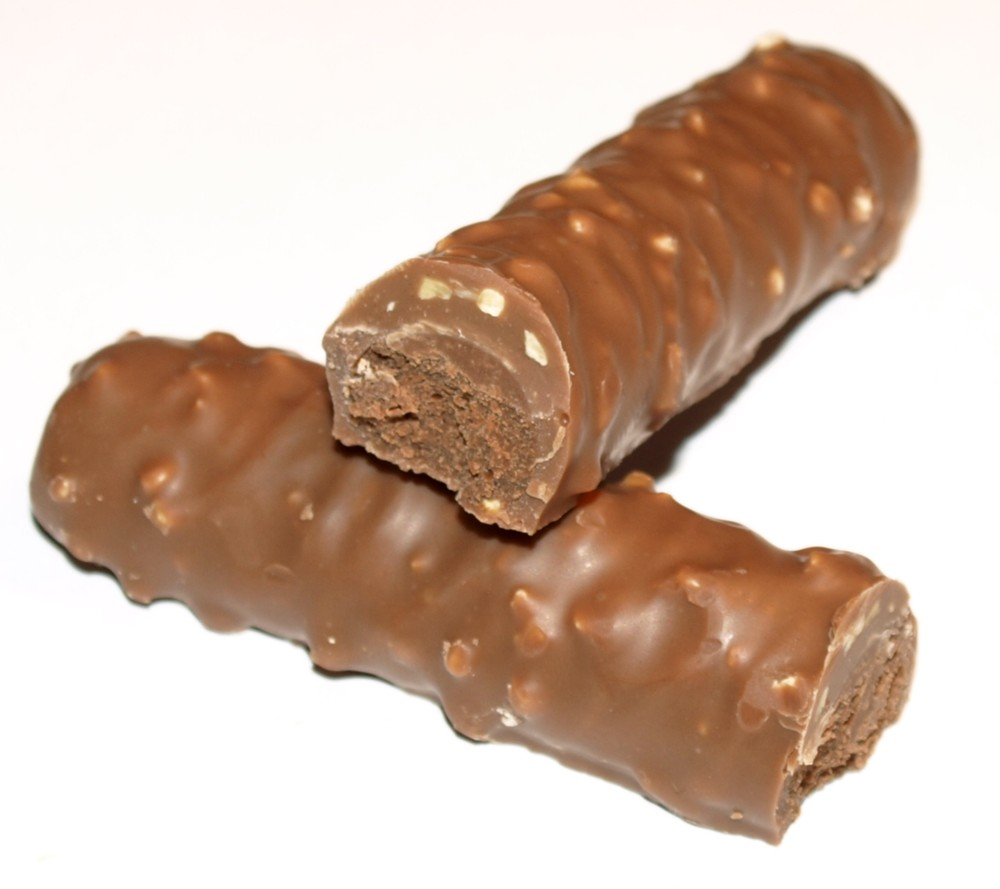
A Frey Branche, inspired from the Cailler Branche

In 1963 the construction of the present headquarters began and the plant was relocated from Aarau to Buchs in the Canton of Aargau. At the same time the entire chocolate, confectionery and sweets manufacture, which Migros had operated until then, was centralised in one location. With this, the company mutated into a modern and successful industrial firm. Since 1974, as the only Swiss manufacturer it has also produced chewing gum, which today accounts for around 10% of Frey's total annual turnover.

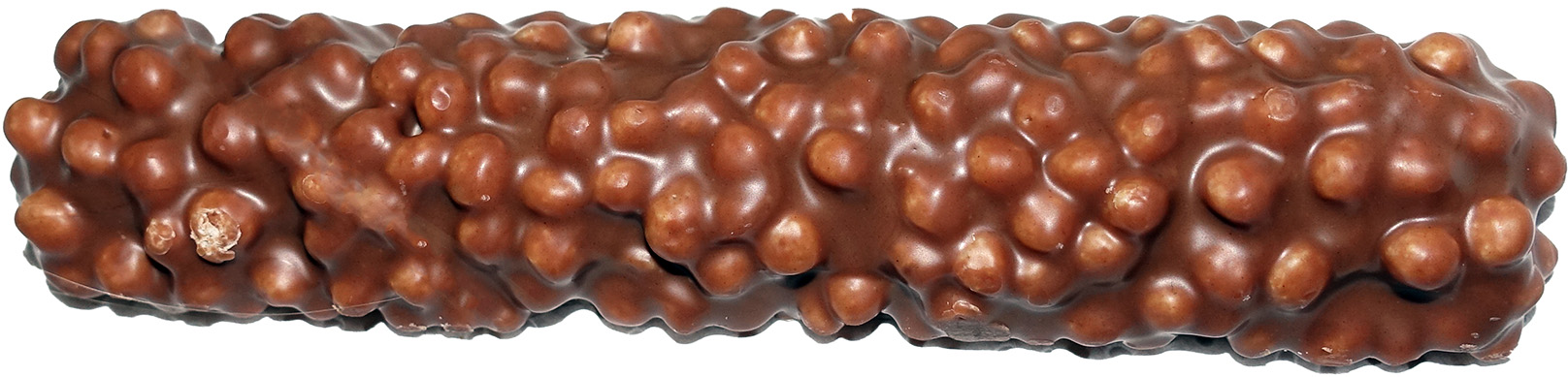
A Risoletto, a popular combination bar launched in 1967, three years after the Nestlé Chokito

In the 1980s two-figure increases in turnover filled the business accounting ledgers. In 1985 the company's turnover exceeded the CHF 200 million threshold for the first time and the firm soon took over leadership on the domestic chocolate market. These good preconditions facilitated investments. Various structural and quality-related changes were implemented and the issue of environmental protection gained in importance. In line with this the company has been procuring district heating from the nearby refuse incineration plant since 1984. Since then the company has managed virtually without heating oil. In addition, the plant was upgraded with a new SBB (Swiss Railways) rail connection. The 1980s were of great importance for international trade as well. For the first time since the Second World War foreign trade was re-established. The United Kingdom, the USA, Denmark, Austria and Japan, later also France and South East Asia, imported the chocolate of Frey. However, for the time being export remained a modest secondary business. During the 1990s, the international trade was expanded and professionalised. In 1997 the company launched its new project ‘Chocolat Frey goes international’, with the aim of export contributing to Frey’s profitability in the long term. A key account management system was introduced for key customer liaison and support.

=== 21st century ===
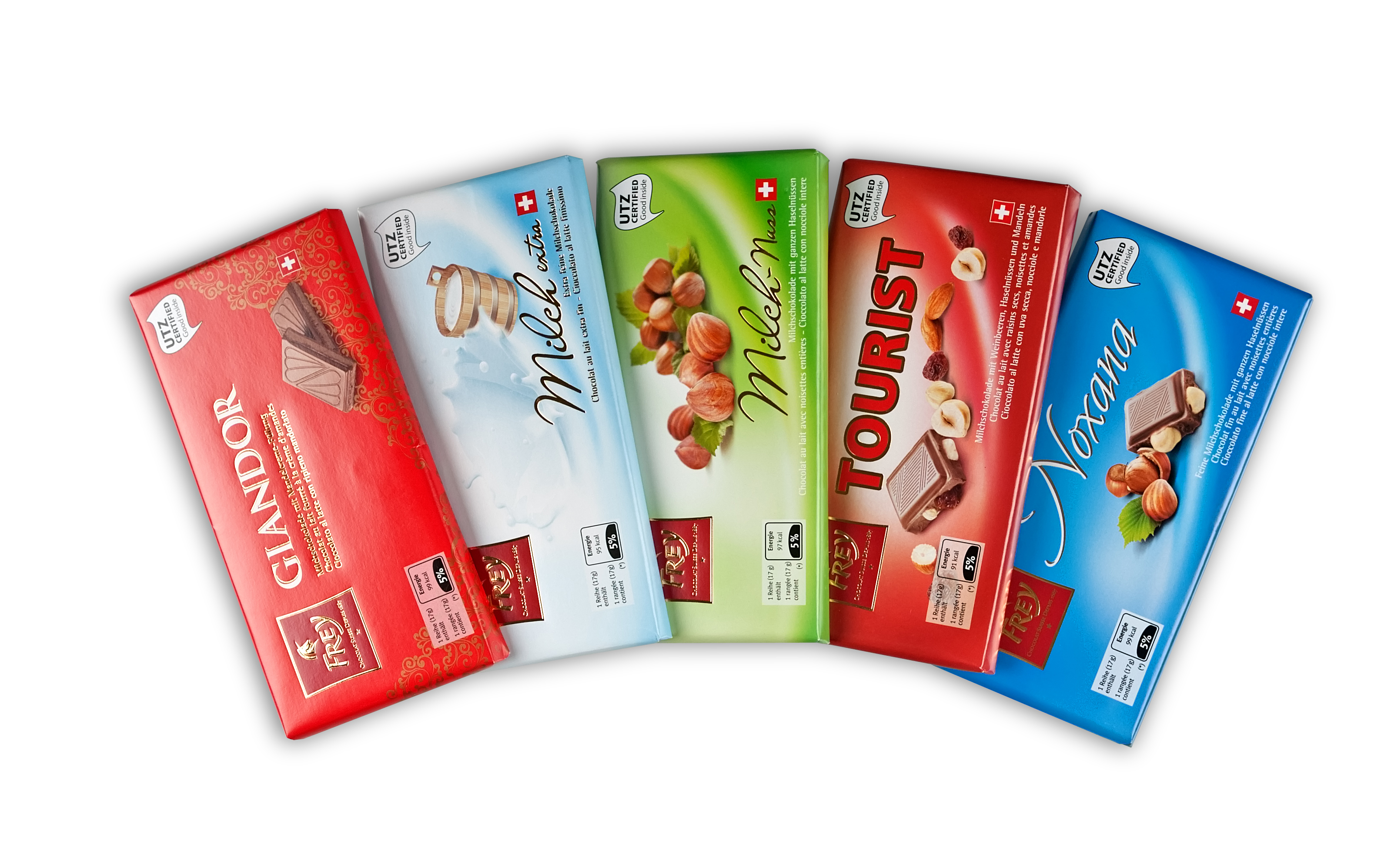
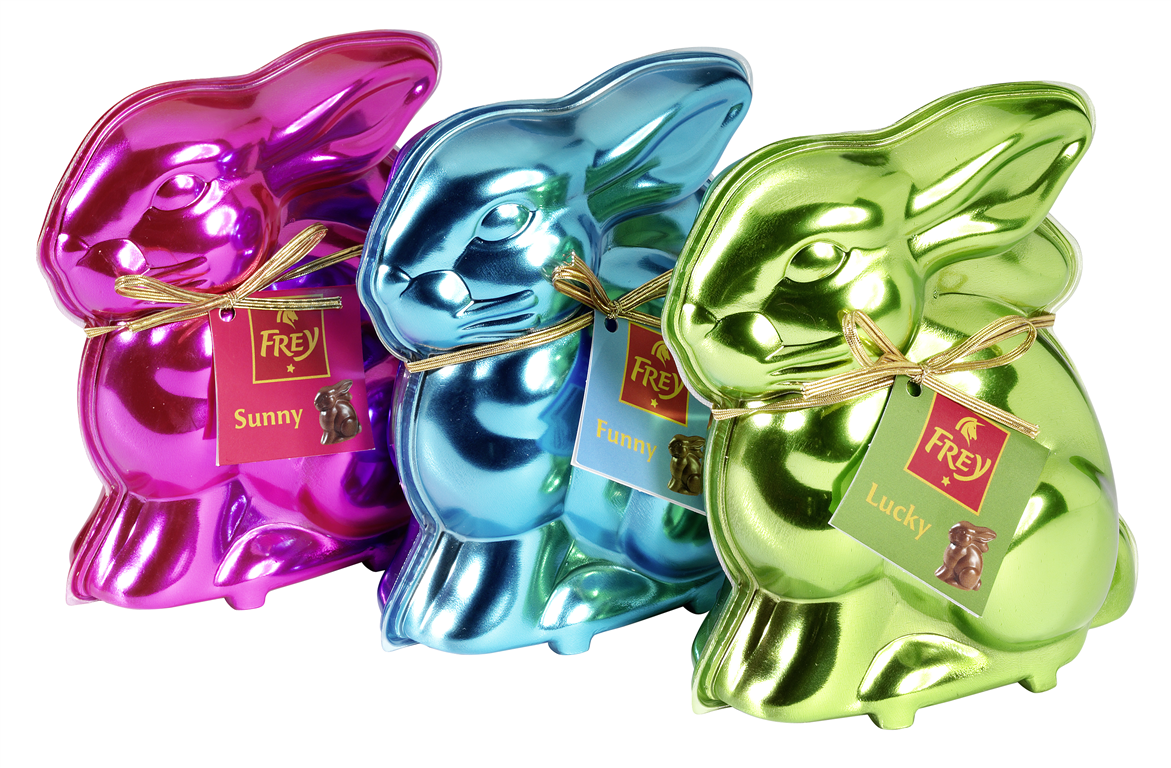
(Left): Chocolate bars; (right): the bunnies Sunny, Funny and Lucky from the Easter range

International trade with private labels continued to be expanded after the start of the 21st century. The Netherlands, Scandinavia, Canada and Germany were new additions. The foreign market became the company's most important growth factor. Since 2007 in addition to the private labels, the brand Frey has been offered again internationally, both in the travel retail business, i.e. in duty-free shops at airports and through sales in collaboration with international trade partners worldwide. In 2008 the two companies Frey and Delica, both specialised in ‘indulgence’ foods, closed ranks. In order to strengthen the international market position and to utilise synergies to their best potential, it stood to reason to place both companies under one overall direction – a position held by the CEO of Frey. Nonetheless, Delica AG will remain a corporate body, as do the two sites of Buchs and Birsfelden. In 2020, the company achieved more than one third of its total turnover abroad. The products are sold in over 50 nations on all five continents. More than 42,000 tons of chocolate, confectionery products, semi-finished products and chewing gum leave the production facilities in Buchs annually. On the domestic market the company is the number 1 among Swiss chocolate manufacturers with a 34,9% market share (according to Chocosuisse 2013). Chewing gum also accounts for part of the total turnover as around 10% are achieved in the chewing gum segment, around 2/3 of this with private labels in the international business.

In 2012 Frey celebrated its 125th anniversary.

Frey opened its new visitor center in Buchs at Easter 2014, which was closed again in August 2020. A multi-purpose building was implemented on the premises by Migros. Also in 2014, Frey acquired North American SweetWorks Confections and its manufacturing facilities in Buffalo and Toronto.

Chocolat Frey has been a brand since the merger into Delica AG in 2021. This was repositioned in the run-up to the merger because it could not keep up with Lindt. Prices were reduced and products from Lindt and Toblerone were added to the Migros range as of April 2021. Swiss has been supplied with chocolate since 2015 (as of 2021).

== Company ==
=== Headquarters ===
In 1966 the manufacturing base of Frey relocated from Aarau to the newly built factory in Buchs in the Canton of Aargau. To date Buchs is the only manufacturing base for chocolate and chewing gum. However, the area was continually developed and extended. Today it comprises several buildings on an area totalling around 70,000 m^{2}, for storing and processing cocoa and manufacturing chocolate and chewing gum. In addition (on a further lot of approx. 10,000 m^{2}), the company has its own railway connection to the SBB (Swiss Railways) for the supply of raw materials and delivery of semi-finished and finished products.

=== Key figures ===
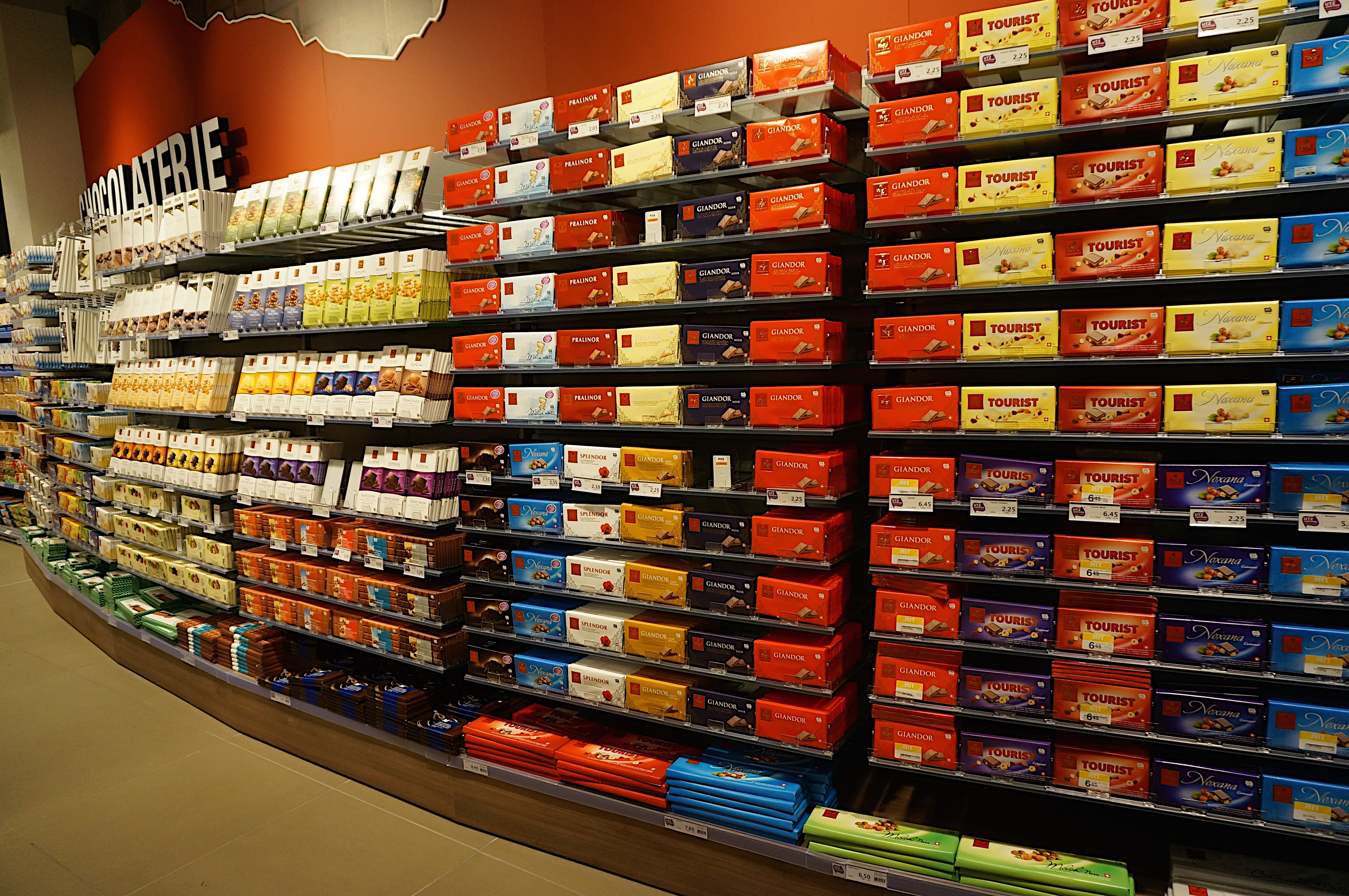
A Migros chocolate department, where most of the Frey products are sold

More than 500,000 bars of chocolate leave the production premises in Buchs/Aargau daily. Annualised, this means more than 41,000 tons spread over 2,400 different products. In addition to chocolate and pralines, Frey’s core products, the company manufactures semi-finished products (couvertures, chocolate and cocoa powders and liquors, fillings etc.) for further processing in industry and trade, chewing gum under the brands Skai and Candida as well as private labels. With a market share of approximately 35% (according to Chocosuisse, 2015), Frey is the leading chocolate manufacturer on the Swiss market. The company employs more than 1000 members of staff and in 2015 achieved a gross turnover of CHF 396 million.

=== Certifications ===
Frey is certified in accordance with:

- ISO 9001
- ISO 14001
- FSSC 22000 (Food Safety System Certification)
- IFS (International Food Standard)

=== Logo ===
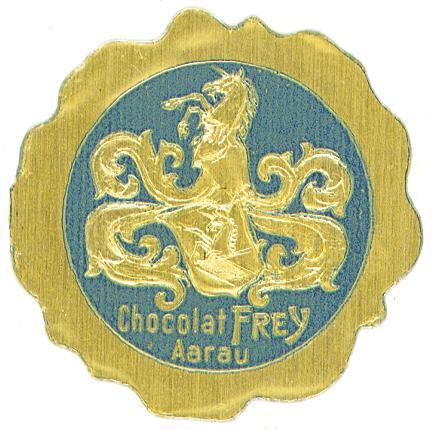
Historic logo of Frey

With the unicorn’s head the company logo of Frey includes an element of the family crest of the brothers Max and Robert Frey. As the family name of ‘Frey’ was used as a brand name as well, it was also integrated into the logo. In addition, the company's traditional character of chocolate manufacturing is established through the time reference of ‘CHOCOLAT SUISSE DEPUIS 1887’ (‘SWISS CHOCOLATE SINCE 1887’), which is displayed below the family name against a red background.

== Sustainability ==
Frey bases its understanding of sustainability on the three-pillar model. Sustainable development can only be achieved by considering economic, social and ecological criteria in equal measure and along the entire value chain. Since 2011 Frey has acquired cocoa beans through the program of UTZ Certified, ensuring the compliance with social minimum standards and better wages for the cocoa farmers. Thanks to the utilisation of district heating instead of crude oil, respective structural measures, raising awareness and training of personnel as well as consistent controlling, energy consumption could be decreased by almost a quarter over the past few years, thus lowering the emission of CO_{2} significantly. In line with this, Frey was awarded ‘CO_{2}-reduced company’ certification by the commercial environment agency for its voluntary endeavours in favour of climate protection. As a logical consequence, the company was awarded environmental certification according to ISO 14001 in 2008.

=== Commitment ===
With its commitment to the SOS Children's Village in Ghana, Frey supports orphaned and abandoned children. In 2007 the company financed the construction of one of currently twelve family houses in the SOS Children's Village Asiakwa, Ghana, and since then has secured the annual running costs of this house. It was put into operation in April 2008 and currently provides 10 children with a family environment with a ‘mother’ as a caregiver.

== Criticism ==
Food additives such as Titanium(IV) oxide (E171) in chewing gum are being criticised. In August 2019, Migros announced that the controversial additive would initially no longer be added to a large part of the range of its in-house chewing gum brand Skai. Since April 2021, no Skai chewing gum has been produced with E171. The M-Classic chewing gum should also be produced without E171 by the end of 2021.

== See also ==
- List of bean-to-bar chocolate manufacturers
