= Delica (enterprise) =

- Company type: Public company
- Industry: Food, logistics
- Founded: 1954
- Headquarters: Birsfelden (Basel-Landschaft), Switzerland
- Key people: Hans-Ruedi Christen (CEO)
- Revenue: CHF 269.5 million (2013)
- Number of employees: 331 (2013)
- Website: www.delica.ch

Delica AG, based in Birsfelden (near Basel), is a business enterprise of the M-Industry and belongs to the Swiss trading group Migros. Its field of activities comprises the procurement, refinement, packaging and marketing of raw materials and commodities from around the world, with particular emphasis on coffee and non-perishable foods such as dried fruits and mushrooms, nuts and kernels, spices, as well as legumes.

Delica supplies retail traders, wholesalers, food manufacturers and catering companies. In 2013 the company had a turnover of over 269 million Swiss Francs, of which 23.8 million came from exports.

In June 2021 it legally merged with 4 other enterprises in the Migros-Industry Segment 4, to form the new Delica AG with headquarters in Buchs AG.

== History ==
Migros Lagerhaus Genossenschaft (MLG) was founded in 1954. The Federation of Migros Cooperatives (FMC) bought a site for MLG on the former Basel-Sternenfeld airfield in Birsfelden, which had been shut down in 1953. This site was located directly on the banks of the Rhine, where a mooring and shipping terminal was built for the subsidiary Reederei Zürich AG (RZ), a shipping company founded in the same year. Since its opening, the warehouse complex of MLG consisted of cold storage rooms and dry storage facilities for nuts, coffee, tea, spices and dried fruits, as well as the centralised coffee roasting house and the packaging lines for the products delivered.

Migros Zentralpackerei AG (MZP) was established in 1964 on the same premises and took over the coffee roasting house and packaging lines from MLG. In addition, MZP took on the task of producing paper packaging for all Migros cooperatives.

The frozen poultry section and the GIFA warehouse were moved to the central distribution centre of Migros-Verteilbetrieb Neuendorf AG (MVN) in 1972 and 1974, respectively. In 1977 the operations and distribution centre of the Migros Cooperative Basel was transferred from the site in Birsfelden to Münchenstein, upon which MLG took over the properties.

On 1 January 1987, MLG and MZP merged to become Migros Betriebe Birsfelden AG (MBB). MBB took over the marketing, sales and procurement divisions from FMC on 1 June 2004. As a commercial enterprise, MBB also offered logistics services (handling, storage, customs clearance) to third parties. 20 years after the merger, on 1 January 2007, MBB changed its name to Delica AG. In November 2006, the packaging production was outsourced to the newly founded InnoPacking AG in Pratteln by means of a management buyout.

In October 2008, the FMC management agreed to a partial merger between Delica and its affiliated company Chocolat Frey, which took effect on 1 January 2009. Since then, both companies have been run by one and the same management team, while the administration has been centralised to a large extent at the headquarters of Chocolat Frey in Buchs in the canton of Aargau.

== Products ==
Delica's product range comprises coffee, tea, spices, legumes (beans, lentils, peas), nuts, dried fruits and dried mushrooms. Coffees make up Delica's best-selling product group. Since their launch in 2004, the Delizio coffee capsules have overtaken Delica's traditional ground and unground coffee beans and instant coffee in terms of turnover. Moreover, the Delizio coffee capsule system was launched internationally under the name of Cremesso in September 2009, and is now sold in several countries in Europe, the Middle East and Asia. In 2012, Delica AG introduced Café Royal, an premium brand compatible with the Nespresso coffee capsule system. Since 2019, coffee capsules have also been made from aluminium in addition to plastic. The Café Royal brand also advertised with Robbie Williams as a testimonial until 2019.

With some 12,200 tonnes of processed green coffee, acquired through the program of UTZ Certified, and a packaging capacity of 27 million sales units per year, Delica is one of Switzerland's largest coffee roasting companies. Up to 100 tonnes of coffee can be processed each day in its three roasting plants. With about 9,000 tonnes of processed non-perishables and a capacity of more than 37 million sales units per year, Delica is also one of the biggest domestic packing companies of non-perishable products.

As a commercial enterprise, Delica also acts as a middleman for the affiliated companies that belong to FMC. In addition, goods for wholesalers and third-party food producers are imported and processed, and about 10% are exported.

== Commitment ==
Delica supports the program on family strengthening implemented by SOS Children's Villages in Ca Mau (Vietnam). Its aim is to protect children who are at risk of losing parental care. The families receive financial support in order to cover the costs of food, clothing and school material for their children. In Ca Mau about 200 children currently benefit from this program.

In 2016, Delica started the “La Laguna” project in Honduras, supporting 300 coffee farmers over a period of five years with the cultivation, harvesting, processing, transport and sale of coffee. In addition, Delica has made direct investments in improved coffee processing infrastructure to enable high-quality processing to be able to directly purchase coffee from farmers.

== See also ==
- Migros
