= Buchs, Aargau =

Buchs
- Municipality
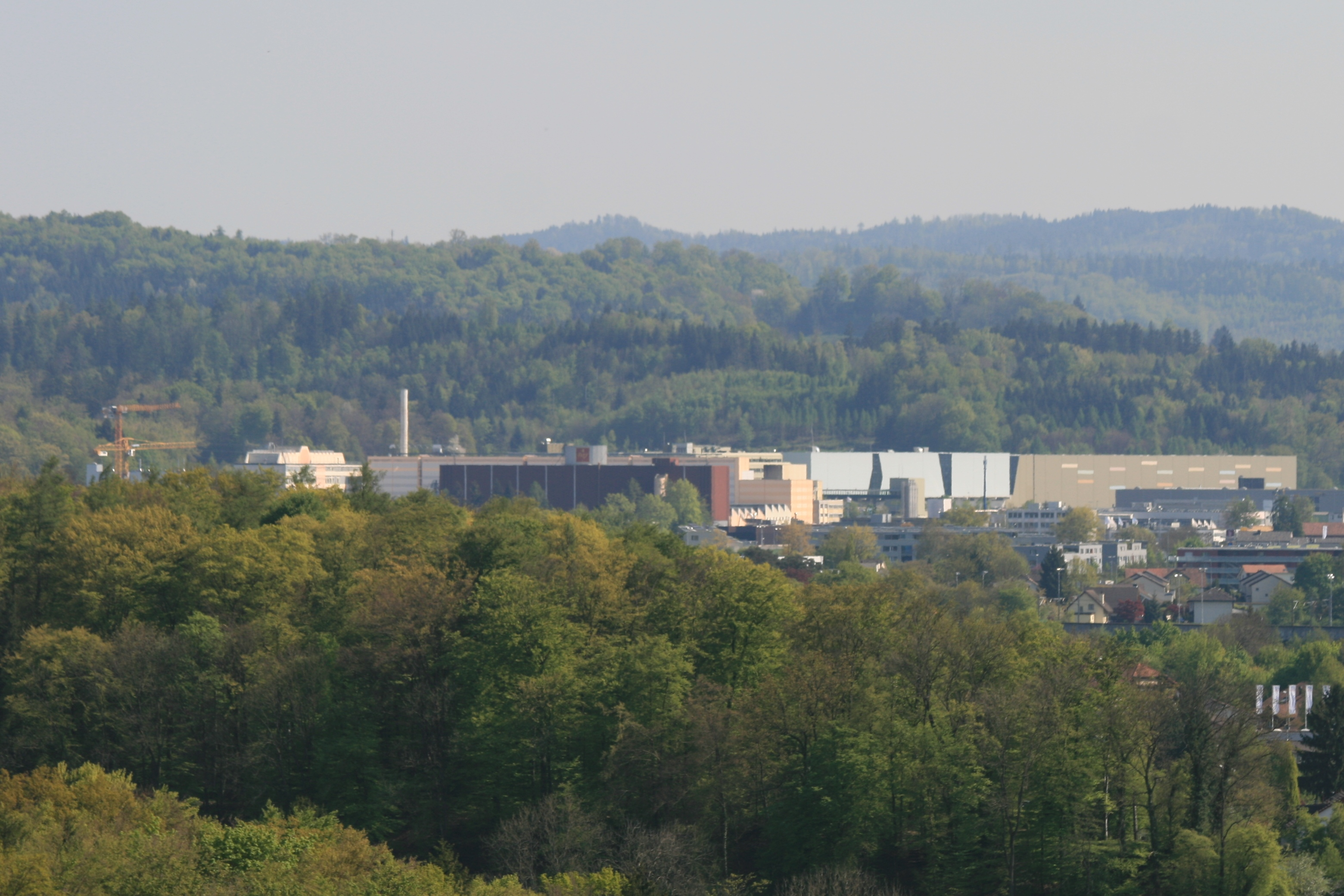

- Flag Coat of arms
- Location of Buchs
- Location within Switzerland Location within Canton of Aargau
- Coordinates: 47°23′N 8°05′E
- Country: Switzerland
- Canton: Aargau
- District: Aarau

Area
  - Total: 5.36 km^{2} (2.07 sq mi)
- Elevation: 383 m (1,257 ft)

Population (December 2020)
  - Total: 8,121
  - Density: 1,520/km^{2} (3,920/sq mi)
- Time zone: UTC+01:00 (CET)
  - Summer (DST): UTC+02:00 (CEST)
- Postal code: 5033
- SFOS number: 4003
- ISO 3166 code: CH-AG
- Surrounded by: Aarau, Rohr, Rupperswil, Suhr
- Website: buchs-aargau.ch

Buchs (German pronunciation: [bʊks]) is a municipality in the district of Aarau of the canton of Aargau in Switzerland.

It is located near the river Suhre and borders with the municipalities of Aarau, Rupperswil and Suhr. The municipality is accessed by the A1 motorway via the Aarau-Ost exit.

Aerial view (1953)

== History ==
Buchs is first mentioned in 1225 as Buhse. In 1361 it was mentioned as Buchs.

== Coat of arms ==
The blazon of the municipal coat of arms is Argent a Box-tree Vert eradicated issuant from Coupeaux of the same. The coat of arms contains an example of canting, the tree is a box-tree (German: Buchsbaum) which refers to the municipal name.

== Geography ==
The center of the village is located at the river Suhre, which joins the river Aare two kilometers farther north. The older populated areas are the "Oberdorf" west of, and the "Ausserdorf" east of, the river; this is surrounded by the newer areas. The area of Buchs lies in the plains of the Suhre, the eastern part is covered by the "Suretwald" forest.

Buchs has an area, as of 2006, of 5.3 km^{2} (2.0 sq mi). Of this area, 13.5% is used for agricultural purposes, while 46.2% is forested. Of the rest of the land, 40.2% is settled (buildings or roads) and the remainder (0.2%) is non-productive (rivers or lakes).

The highest elevation, 394 meters, is located at the south-west border in the "Steinfeld" area, the lowest elevation, 371 meters, is located where the Suhre leaves the area of Buchs in the north.

== Demographics ==
Buchs has a population (as of 31 December 2020) of 8,121. As of 2008, 31.3% of the population was made up of foreign nationals. Over the last 10 years the population has grown at a rate of 3.7%. Most of the population (as of 2000) speaks German (80.3%), with Italian being second most common ( 6.0%) and Serbo-Croatian being third ( 4.3%). Of the rest of the population 2.6% spoke Turkish, 1.2% Spanish, 0.7% Albanian, 0.6% French, 0.5% Portuguese.

The age distribution, as of 2008, in Buchs is; 615 children or 9.4% of the population are between 0 and 9 years old and 716 teenagers or 10.9% are between 10 and 19. Of the adult population, 946 people or 14.5% of the population are between 20 and 29 years old. 976 people or 14.9% are between 30 and 39, 1,020 people or 15.6% are between 40 and 49, and 855 people or 13.1% are between 50 and 59. The senior population distribution is 586 people or 9.0% of the population are between 60 and 69 years old, 482 people or 7.4% are between 70 and 79, there are 294 people or 4.5% who are between 80 and 89, and there are 49 people or 0.7% who are 90 and older.

As of 2000, there were 340 homes with 1 or 2 persons in the household, 1,538 homes with 3 or 4 persons in the household, and 756 homes with 5 or more persons in the household. The average number of people per household was 2.24 individuals. In 2008 there were 912 single family homes (or 28.9% of the total) out of a total of 3,153 homes and apartments.

The entire Swiss population is generally well educated. In Buchs about 66.7% of the population (between age 25–64) have completed either non-mandatory upper secondary education or additional higher education (either university or a Fachhochschule). Of the school age population (in the 2008/2009 school year), there are 434 students attending primary school, there are 123 students attending secondary school, there are 166 students attending tertiary or university level schooling in the municipality.

The historical population is given in the following table:

Historical population
Year	Pop.	±%
1764	416	—
1850	935	+124.8%
1900	1,592	+70.3%
1920	2,231	+40.1%
1930	2,720	+21.9%
1941	3,255	+19.7%
1950	3,899	+19.8%
1970	6,742	+72.9%
1990	5,853	−13.2%
2000	6,175	+5.5%

== Climate ==
Climate data for Buchs/Aarau (1991–2020)
Month	Jan	Feb	Mar	Apr	May	Jun	Jul	Aug	Sep	Oct	Nov	Dec	Year
Mean daily maximum °C (°F)	3.2 (37.8)	5.2 (41.4)	10.4 (50.7)	14.7 (58.5)	19.4 (66.9)	22.7 (72.9)	25.4 (77.7)	24.7 (76.5)	20.1 (68.2)	14.5 (58.1)	7.6 (45.7)	4.0 (39.2)	14.3 (57.7)
Daily mean °C (°F)	0.7 (33.3)	1.5 (34.7)	5.6 (42.1)	9.3 (48.7)	13.9 (57.0)	17.1 (62.8)	19.2 (66.6)	18.5 (65.3)	14.5 (58.1)	10.1 (50.2)	4.7 (40.5)	1.8 (35.2)	9.7 (49.5)
Mean daily minimum °C (°F)	−1.9 (28.6)	−1.9 (28.6)	1.2 (34.2)	4.1 (39.4)	8.5 (47.3)	11.7 (53.1)	13.4 (56.1)	13.1 (55.6)	9.8 (49.6)	6.7 (44.1)	2.0 (35.6)	−0.5 (31.1)	5.5 (41.9)
Average precipitation mm (inches)	63.1 (2.48)	52.6 (2.07)	61.3 (2.41)	63.2 (2.49)	98.5 (3.88)	92.2 (3.63)	98.4 (3.87)	98.3 (3.87)	69.6 (2.74)	72.0 (2.83)	69.1 (2.72)	81.4 (3.20)	919.7 (36.21)
Average snowfall cm (inches)	10.6 (4.2)	12.6 (5.0)	5.0 (2.0)	0.1 (0.0)	0 (0)	0 (0)	0 (0)	0 (0)	0 (0)	0.1 (0.0)	3.5 (1.4)	10.3 (4.1)	42.2 (16.6)
Average precipitation days (≥ 1.0 mm)	10.6	9.1	11.0	11.1	12.3	12.0	11.5	11.0	9.2	10.1	10.3	11.5	129.7
Average snowy days (≥ 1.0 cm)	2.9	3.1	1.6	0.1	0	0	0	0	0	0	1.0	2.6	11.3
Average relative humidity (%)	85.7	82.5	77.6	74.2	73.6	73.3	72.5	76.3	80.9	85.1	85.3	85.7	79.4
Mean monthly sunshine hours	41.2	74.2	133.2	166.8	180.6	200.2	219.8	204.1	148.7	86.3	42.8	31.1	1,529
Source 1: NOAA
Source 2: MeteoSwiss

== Government ==
In the 2007 federal election the most popular party was the SVP which received 35.9% of the vote. The next three most popular parties were the SP (19.6%), the FDP (13.1%) and the CVP (10.9%).

=== Legislative ===
In place of a village meeting (Gemeindeversammlung), a citizen assembly (Einwohnerrat) of 40 members is elected by the citizens, and follows the policy of proportional representation. It is responsible for approving tax levels, preparing the annual account, and the business report. In addition, it can issue regulations. The term of office is four years. In the last two elections the parties had the following representation:

Party	2001	2005
SVP	11	11
FDP	7	8
SP	7	8
CVP	4	5
EVP	4	4
Jungliberale Bewegung	4	3
Forum Buchs	3	1

At the district level, some elements of the government remain a direct democracy. There are optional and obligatory referendums, and the population retains the right to establish an initiative.

=== Executive ===
The executive authority is the municipal council (Gemeinderat). The term of office is four years, and its members are elected by a plurality voting system. It leads and represents the municipality. It carries out the resolutions of the assembly, and those requested by the canton and national level governments.

The five members (and their party) for the period 2006-2009 are:

- Heinz Baur (FDP), President (Gemeindeammann)
- Hansruedi Werder (Jungliberale Bewegung), Vice President
- Urs Affolter (FDP)
- Barbara Keusch (CVP)
- Jörg Kissling (SP)

== Economy ==
Buchs offers approximately 4100 jobs, whereof 1% in agriculture, 48% industry and 51% services. The industrial areas are mainly located near the railway line in the north, and in the "Wynenfeld" in the south-eastern part. The largest employers are the Chocolat Frey AG, the Jowa bakery and the Mibelle AG cosmetics manufacturer, all of them belonging to Switzerland's largest retailer Migros. Express and mail delivery company TNT has its Swiss head office and hub in Buchs. The waste incineration plant KVA (Kehricht-Verbrennungs-Anlage) Buchs incinerates the waste of 82 municipalities.

As of 2007, Buchs had an unemployment rate of 2.81%. As of 2005, there were 21 people employed in the primary economic sector and about 4 businesses involved in this sector. 1,997 people are employed in the secondary sector and there are 61 businesses in this sector. 2,096 people are employed in the tertiary sector, with 181 businesses in this sector.

As of 2000 there was a total of 3,231 workers who lived in the municipality. Of these, 2,491 or about 77.1% of the residents worked outside Buchs while 2,892 people commuted into the municipality for work. There were a total of 3,632 jobs (of at least 6 hours per week) in the municipality.

== Traffic ==
A bus line of the Aarau town bus company Busbetrieb Aarau AG connects Buchs to Aarau.

In 1877 the railway company Schweizerische Nationalbahn opened a standard gauge branch line from Aarau via Buchs to Suhr, connecting it with their main line Singen – Winterthur – Wettingen – Lenzburg – Zofingen. It was later taken over by the Swiss Federal Railways (SBB). The Aarau-Buchs-Suhr branch was closed down in 2004. It is currently being replaced by a narrow gauge railway line of the Wynental branch of AAR bus+bahn.

By car, Buchs is accessed by the A1 motorway via the Aarau-Ost exit.

== Religion ==
From the 2000 census, 2,031 or 32.9% are Roman Catholic, while 2,436 or 39.4% belonged to the Swiss Reformed Church. Of the rest of the population, there are 13 individuals (or about 0.21% of the population) who belong to the Christian Catholic faith, 8.1% are Muslim, 4.4% are Orthodox Christian and 1.0% are another religion.
