= Migros =

Swiss retail company

Federation of Migros Cooperatives

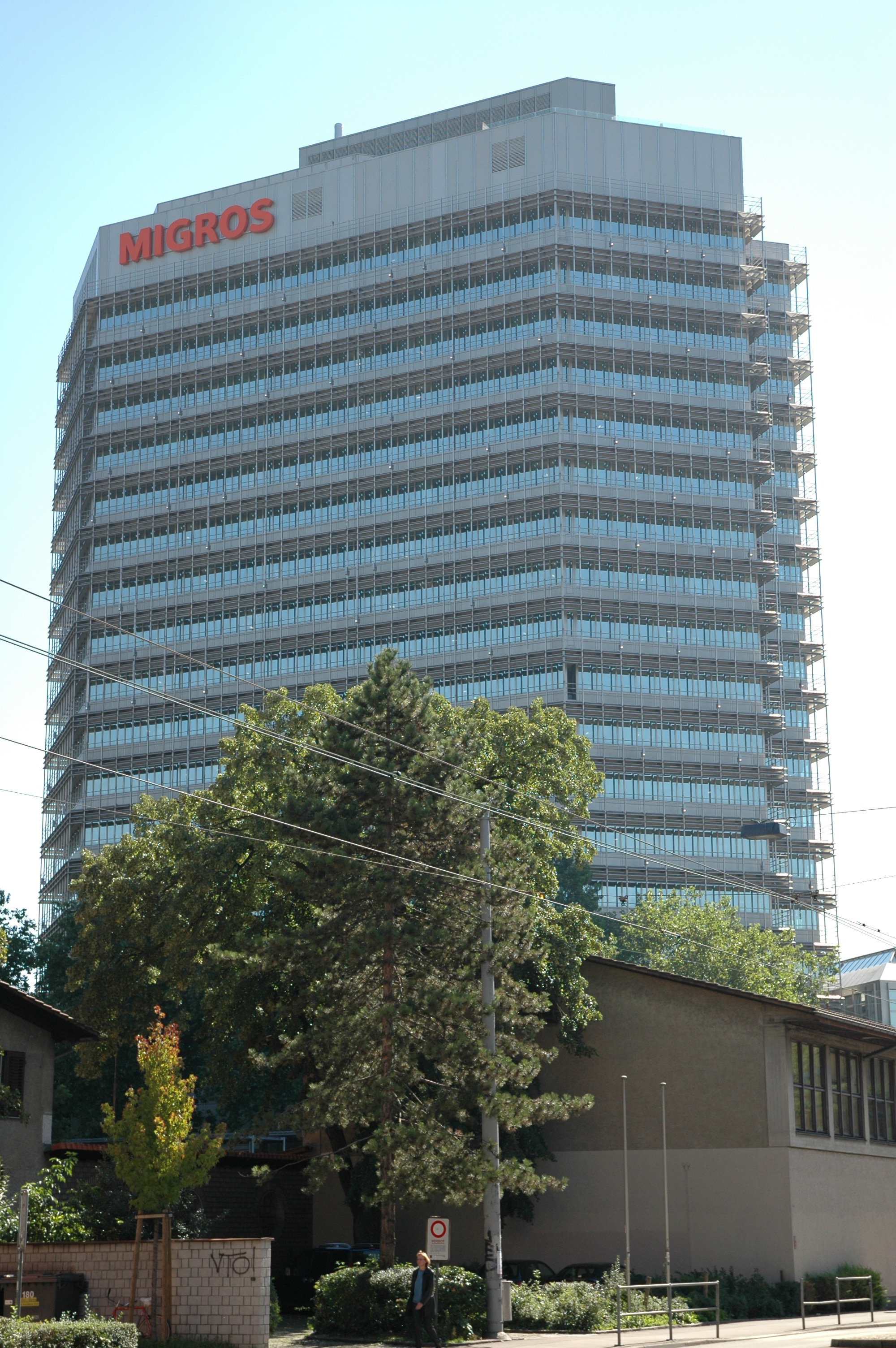
- Migros headquarters in Zurich
- Native name: (in German) Migros-Genossenschafts-Bund (in French) Fédération des coopératives Migros (in Italian) Federazione delle cooperative Migros
- Type: Cooperative federation
- Industry: Retail
- Founded: August 1925 (101 years ago)
- Founder: Gottlieb Duttweiler
- Headquarters: Zurich, Switzerland
- Products: Supermarkets, food industry, petrol, electronics, books, home-wares, etc.
- Revenue: 32.00 billion CHF (2024)
- Operating income: 668 million CHF (2021)
- Number of employees: 97,541 (2021)
- Website: www.migros.ch

Migros (German pronunciation: [ˈmiɡro]) is Switzerland's largest retail company, its largest supermarket chain and largest employer. It is also one of the forty largest retailers in the world. It is structured in the form of a cooperative federation (the Federation of Migros Cooperatives), with more than two million members.

It co-founded Turkey's largest retailer, also named Migros, which became independent of Migros Switzerland in 1975.

The name comes from the French "mi" for half or mid-way and "gros", which means wholesale. Thus the word connotes prices that are halfway between retail and wholesale, along with the business model (medium-scale semi-wholesale). The logo of the company is a large orange M. Migros is often referred to as "the orange giant" (German: oranger Riese, French: géant orange, Italian: gigante arancio).

== History ==
Migros was founded in 1925 in Zurich as a private enterprise by Gottlieb Duttweiler, who had the idea of selling just six basic products at low prices to householders who, in those days, did not have ready access to markets of any kind. At first he sold only coffee, rice, sugar, pasta, coconut oil and soap from five lorries that went from one village or hamlet to another. The strategy to cut the intermediate trade and their margins led to the broad resistance of his competitors who goaded the producers to boycott him. As a reaction to this threat, Migros started creating its own line of goods beginning with meat, milk and chocolate.

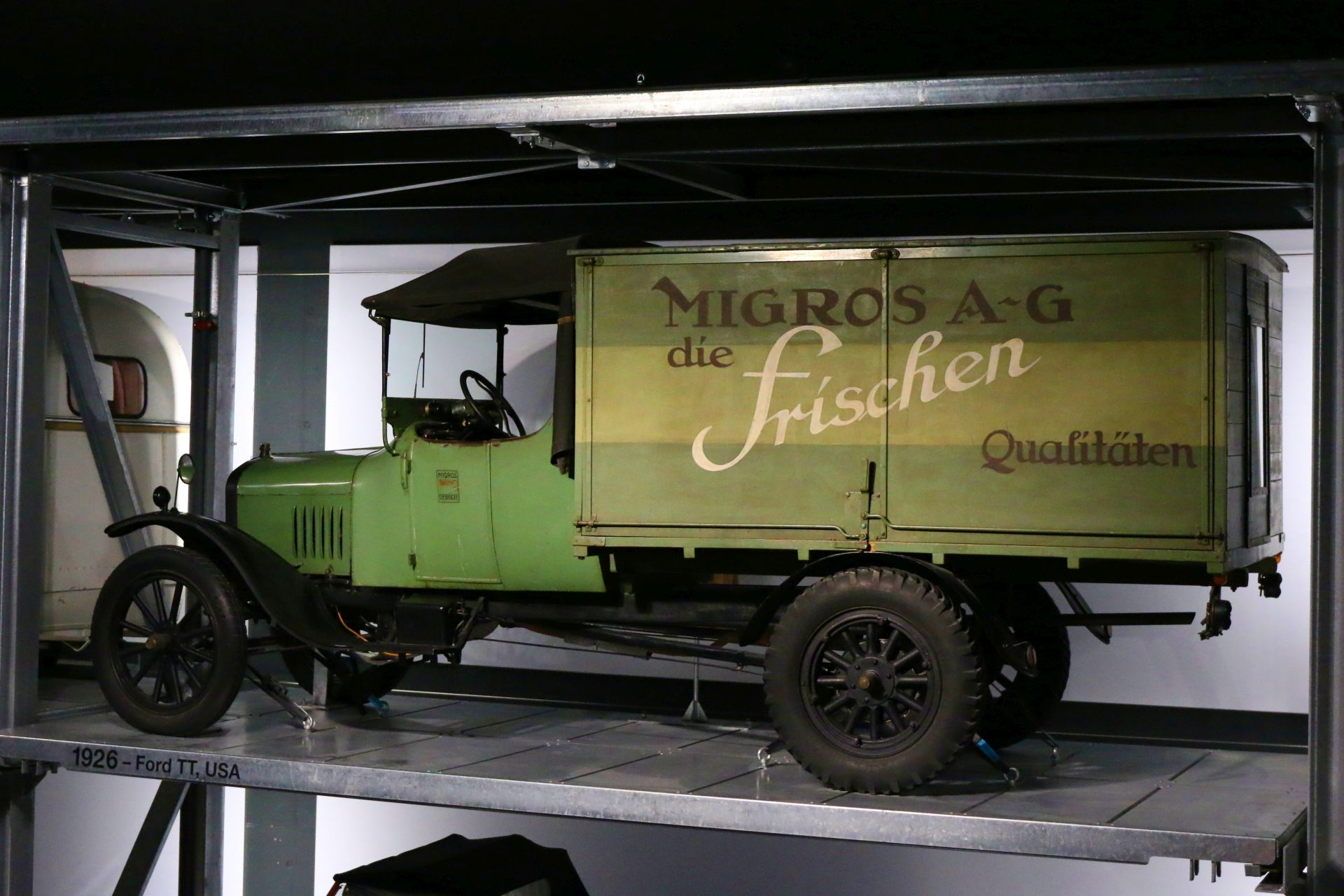
A Migros Ford TT from 1926

Duttweiler and his drivers expanded their inventory and, in 1926, the first retail store opened its doors in Zurich. His second store, in Ticino, presaged the future as it was founded as a cooperative. By 1941, the energetic entrepreneur had built a number of markets but, in that year, he basically gave the business to his customers by transforming everything from his privately owned enterprises into regional cooperatives, headed by the Federation of Migros Cooperatives.

As early as 1935, Duttweiler showed his zest for expansion by founding the Hotelplan travel agency. In 1942, the Migros brand was applied to a weekly magazine, Wir Brückenbauer (lit. 'We Bridgebuilders', now known as Migros Magazine). Other ventures were restaurants in 1952, filling stations (Migrol) in 1954, language schools (Eurocentres) in 1956, the Migros Bank in 1957 and an insurance company in 1959.

In 1948, the economist Elsa Gasser convinced Duttweiler to introduce the self-service approach in Migros stores, paving the way for the development of Switzerland's most successful supermarket chain.

On behalf of the Migros Federation, the Zurich-based Reederei Zürich AG ordered at the H. C. Stülcken Sohn shipyard in Hamburg, Germany, the cargo ship Adele which was launched on 15 July 1952; the ship was christened by Adele Duttweiler, the wife of Gottlieb Duttweiler.

In 1954 Migros entered the Turkish market, forming Migros Türk in partnership with the Istanbul City Council. This was sold to the Turkish conglomerate Koç Holding in 1975 and is the largest retailer in Turkey. Between 2008 and 2011, Koç Holding sold most of its shares of Migros Türk to BC Partners. It would not be until 1993 that Migros would open another foreign supermarket, this time in Thoiry, near Geneva.

1986 saw Migros' first recreation park, Säntispark, in Abtwil.

In 1995, Migros introduced its organic label "Migros Bio" (products which follow the Bio Suisse guidelines). In 2017, it added a specific label for organic products containing at least 90% Swiss ingredients ("Migros Bio Suisse").

In October 2012, one of the federations, Genossenschaft Migros Zürich, expanded in the German market by acquiring the Hessian food store chain Tegut. In the same year, Migros opened the first Swiss store of German organic supermarket chain Alnatura. In 2013, however, the company announced the sale to the REWE retail group of its four Migros-branded stores in Germany, the first of which had established in 1995 in Lörrach, near Basel.

In 2016, Migros announced that it would phase-out free plastic bags at check-out. Migros had tested the measure in the Canton of Vaud since 2013: the measure had reduced the number of plastic bags distributed by ninety percent (and saved 100,000 francs per year). Migros was the first to introduce the measure across the country, on 1 November 2016. The company also announced that profits from the remaining sale of plastic bags would be invested in environmental projects.

In 2024-2025, Migros sold several companies of the group (bike, do-it-yourself, electronics, furniture, and sport shops, travel agencies, and cosmetics factories) to focus on four fields within Switzerland (grocery stores, non-food retail, banking, and health).

In 2026, due to lack of profitability of the Tegut chain since the purchase back in 2013, Genossenschaft Migros Zürich sold off two-thirds of the company's 300 branches to German rival Edeka and liquidated the rest of the chain to focus on its home market.

=== Philosophy ===
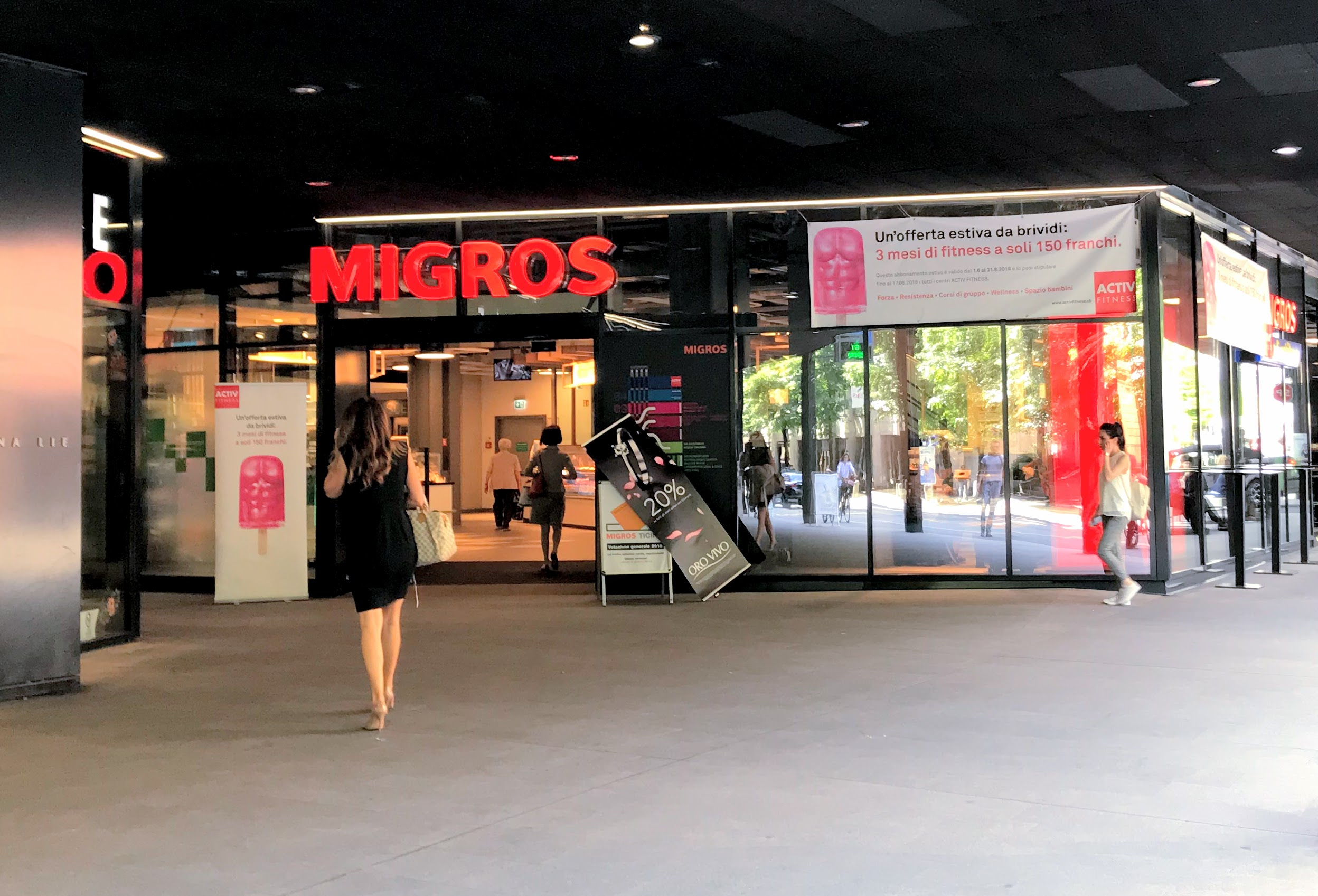
A Migros supermarket in Lugano, Switzerland

Gottlieb Duttweiler was concerned about the health of his customers and decided that Migros would not sell any alcoholic beverages nor any tobacco. It is still the case today; although Denner, owned by the Migros group, does sell alcoholic beverages and cigarettes.

Here is a summary of some characteristics of Migros and its "responsible" philosophy guided by Gottlieb and Adele Duttweiler's "fifteen theses":

- Does not sell any alcoholic beverages nor any tobacco (It does so on its online shop, however);
- Does not pay any dividends;
- If the earnings before interest and taxes (EBIT) reaches 5% of the market value of the company, the supermarkets have to lower their prices;
- Organised as a cooperative (federation of regional cooperatives), with more than two million shareholders;
- Every adult living in Switzerland can become a member (receive a share for free) and vote at the general assembly;
- Uses 1% of its revenue to social and cultural projects.

Migros was also a prominent supporter of women's suffrage in Switzerland, it financed a considerable amount of the yes campaigns in the different cantons and also the two national referendums in 1959 and 1971. It counted with an in-house women suffrage committee and for the yes campaign of the successful national referendum in 1971, Migros gave out paper bags printed with advertising for the yes campaign. In its weekly company magazine, which counted with a circulation of about 600,000 magazines, it published articles supporting women's suffrage ahead of the referendum for several weeks.

Adèle and Gottlieb Duttweiler's "fifteen theses" (1950), without being legally binding, are an ethical heritage of Migros. They contain values and guidance such as a goal of "serving the community", "The general principle that we profess is to place people at the center of the economy" and "The general interest will be placed higher than the interests of the Migros cooperatives".

The company attracted controversy, however, when in 1977 it fired its most outspoken internal critic, Hans A. Pestalozzi, who was then working for the Gottlieb Duttweiler Institute, a think tank whose goal was to investigate the shortcomings of capitalism in modern society.

In 2021, Migros began considering alcohol sales in its supermarkets. A June 2022 vote was held and the sale of alcohol was rejected by each of the ten regional cooperatives by an overwhelming majority of their members.

== Migros today ==
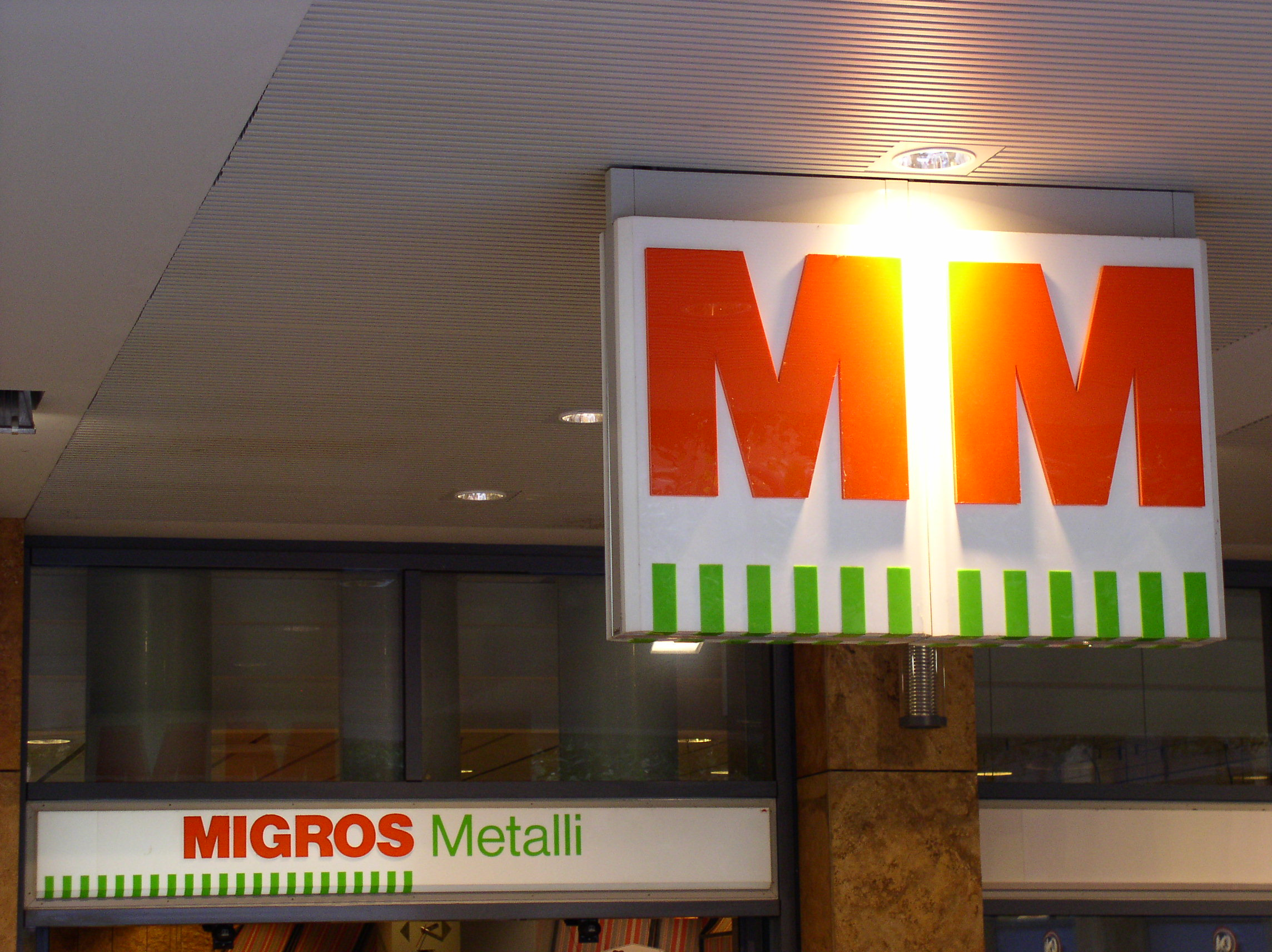
The front of a Migros store in the Metalli shopping center in Zug, Switzerland, using an older logo

To this day, Migros keeps the cooperative society as its form of organisation. A large part of the Swiss population are members of the Migros cooperative – around 2 million of Switzerland's total population of 8.4 million, thus making Migros a supermarket chain that is owned by its customers. More than 90% of the assortment of goods is produced by ninety subsidiaries of Migros.

It has obligated itself to spend one percent of its annual turnover for financing cultural projects in a broad sense; the sub-organisation taking care of this is called Migros Kulturprozent ("cultural percent").

The supermarkets are categorized in the three size classes of M, MM and MMM. The firm's loyalty card is the M-cumulus card (a play on the word accumulate and a type of cloud formation).

=== M-Budget and Migros Sélection ===
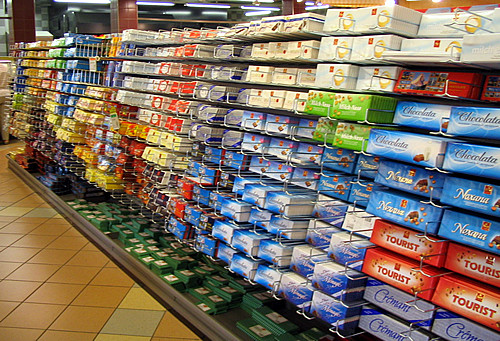
A chocolate (Frey) aisle in a branch of Migros in Interlaken. The M-Budget chocolate is just visible on the bottom shelf.

In 1996, influenced by the budget ranges in supermarket chains in Australia, Migros made their budget range called M-Budget with seventy products aimed at those with low incomes and large families. Now it has grown to 330 products including mountain bikes, snowboards, mp3 players, milk chocolate, jeans, shoes and lighters. M-Budget products have a standardized packaging color scheme, consisting of a grass green background with the Migros logo in small white text repeated over it.

Many of these products are released in limited quantities rather than as a permanent part of the Migros lineup. Whether they become permanent depends on their performance. Combined with Migros’s strong brand recognition, this can increase interest in less common items. As a result, some M-Budget products are treated as collectibles, since there is no guarantee they will be produced again.

To promote the range in the early 2000s Migros developed M-Budget Party tickets costing 9.90 CHF including free non-alcoholic drinks (cola, lemonade and orange juice) and snacks (crisps, chocolate and cakes).

In 2005, together with Swisscom, Migros launched M-Budget Mobile, a pay-as-you-go MVNO mobile virtual network operator.

Also in 2005, Migros introduced a premium line called Migros sélection, featuring for the most part food products typically associated with higher budgets and prepared in different fashions than is available through general stock. Sélection products also have their distinctive packaging, with pearl white and gold color schemes.

In April 2006, Migros announced the M-Budget credit card, an initiative between the Federation of Migros Cooperatives, GE Money Bank and MasterCard, originally with an annual fee of CHF 4.40, which was very low compared to credit card annual fees of CHF 100 for a MigrosBank MasterCard Argent credit card. The card was ready by the autumn 2006. After Coop, the biggest competitor of Migros, announced a credit card without any annual fee, Migros scrapped its annual fee.

In 2014 the company again followed its main competitor Coop and started implementing self-service checkout.

== Companies ==
French version of the Migros Bank logo

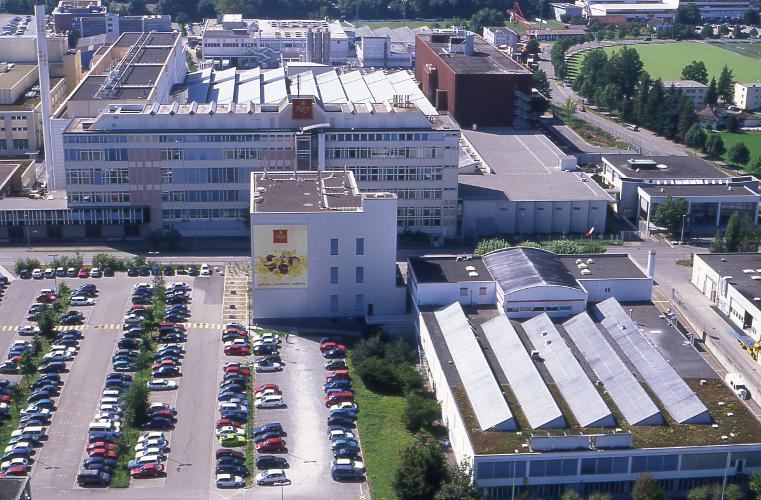
The headquarters of Frey, the Migros chocolate manufacturer, in Buchs

Retail

- Migros supermarkets
- Migrolino: convenience stores (mostly connected to the petrol stations)
- Denner (bought 70% stake in 2007, became a wholly owned subsidiary in 2009)
- Digitec Galaxus: consumer electronics and telecommunication shops, household, DIY, garden and sports equipment, and online shop
- LeShop.ch: online supermarket (cooperation started in 2004, bought 80% stake in 2006)

Finance

- Migros Bank: bank
- Change Migros: currency exchange

Health

- Medbase
- Bestsmile: Swiss dental startup, teeth straightening, dental consultation, acquired by Migros in March 2022

Other

- Migros Klubschule (Migros Club Schools): adult education centres
- Eurocentres: language schools
- Ex Libris: bookshops
- FitnessPark: fitness centres
- Glattzentrum: shopping mall near Zurich
- Golfpark: public golf courses
- Florissimail: postal flower service
- Migrol: petrol stations
- Monte Generoso Railway: railway owned by Migros

=== M-Industry ===
A large part of the products sold in the Migros supermarkets are produced by its own companies (M-Industry), mostly in Switzerland. In 2017, M-Industry comprised 32 companies, 25 of which were in Switzerland, and produce more than 20,000 products for the Migros supermarkets.

M-Industry companies include:

- Aproz: mineral waters, fruit drinks, fruit juices
- Bischofszell: iced tea, fruit juices, convenience food, crips, jams
- Delica: coffees, dried fruits, nuts, spices
- Estavayer Lait SA (ELSA): milk, yogurts
- Frey: chocolate, chewing gums
- Jowa: breads, pastries
- La Risiera: rice
- Micarna: meat and fish
- Midor: biscuits and ice creams
- Mifroma: Raccard, Gruyère and Appenzeller cheese

M-Industry products are exported to fifty countries, including China (under the name Orange Garten, Chinese: 欧瑞家; pinyin: Ōuruìjiā, in partnership with Tmail).

=== Globus group (formerly owned by Migros) ===
Globus Group became part of Migros in 1997, but was sold to Signa Holding and Central Group in 2020.

- Interio: furniture stores, sold separately to Austrian XXXLutz Group in 2019 before being discontinued for good in 2020.
- Globus: premium department stores
- Globus Herren: menswear stores
- Office World: office supplies (not the British Office Worlds, owned by Staples)
- Globi: a cartoon character who is mascot of the Globus Group, often referred to as Switzerland's Mickey Mouse.

=== Former ===
These brands were part of the Migros group in the past but have been closed or sold:

- m-electronics: electronics stores. Closed in 2024, with just over half of the locations taken over by MediaMarkt.
- SportXX: sports shops. Sold to Oschner Sport in 2025.
- Hotelplan: tour operator, sold in 2024
- Micasa: furniture stores, sold in 2024
- Obi: do it yourself stores, sold in 2024
- Melectronics, sold in 2024
- Bike World, sold in 2024
- Mibelle: cosmetic products, sold in 2025
- Do it+Garden: do-it-yourself stores and garden centres, liquidated in 2025.

== Competitors ==
Migros's main competitor, Coop (Switzerland's second-largest supermarket chain), also has a cooperative structure like Migros, but with a more centralized organization. Smaller competitors include the Manor department-store chain, and more recently German hard discounter Aldi. A further competitor, Lidl, established its first Swiss supermarkets in March 2009.

In January 2007 Migros acquired 70 per cent Denner's shares, effectively merging the largest and third-largest food retail chains in Switzerland. According to both companies, the move took place in order for the Denner chain to better compete with increasing foreign competition.

== See also ==
- List of supermarket chains in Switzerland
- Park im Grüene
