= Economy of Switzerland =

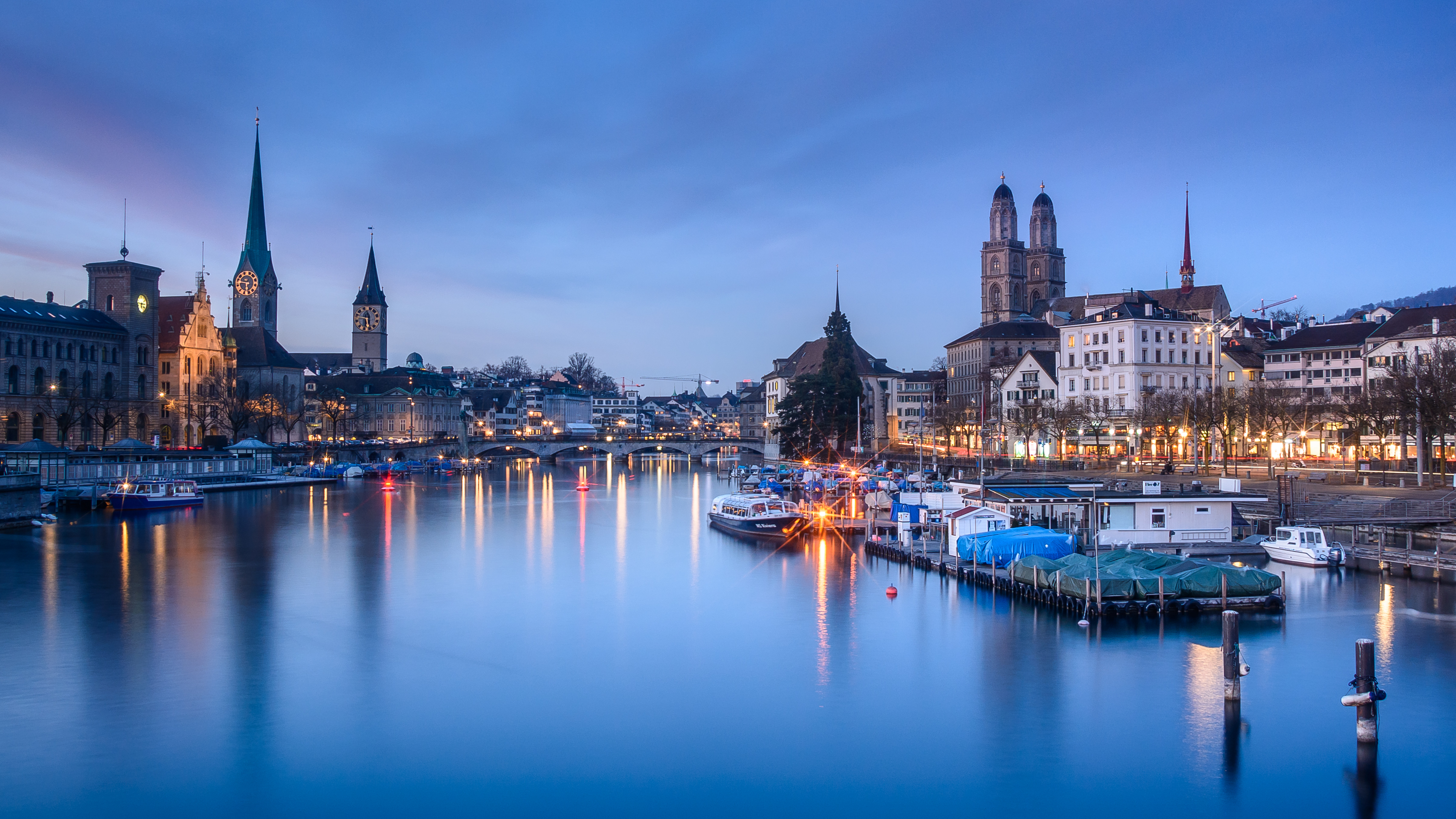
- The city of Zürich, the most important economic center of the country
- Currency: Swiss franc (CHF)
- Fiscal year: Calendar year
- Trade organisations: EFTA, WTO and OECD
- Country group: Advanced economy; High-income economy; Welfare state

Statistics
- Population: ▲8,981,565 (2024)
- GDP: ▲$1.06 trillion (nominal, 2025); ▲$881.08 billion (PPP, 2025)
- GDP rank: 21st (nominal, 2025); 39th (PPP, 2025)
- GDP growth: 1.3% (2026f)
- GDP per capita: ▲$116,410 (nominal, 2025); ▲$97,580 (PPP, 2025)
- GDP per capita rank: 3rd (nominal, 2025); 6th (PPP, 2025)
- GDP per capita growth: 0.0% (2024)
- GDP by sector: Agriculture: 0.7%; Industry: 25.6%; Services: 73.7%; (2017)
- Inflation (CPI): ▲0.6% (2026)
- Population below national poverty line: 8.4% in poverty (2024); 18.8% at risk of poverty or social exclusion (AROPE 2022); 31.9% in poverty before all social transfers (2024)
- Gini coefficient: 31.1 medium (2022)
- Human Development Index: 0.967 very high (2022) (1st); 0.891 very high IHDI (2022)
- Corruption Perceptions Index: ▲82 out of 100 points (2023) (7th)
- Labour force: 4,971,981 (2019); ▲83.0% employment rate (2023)
- Labour force by occupation: Agriculture: 3.3%; Industry: 19.8%; Services: 76.9%; (2015)
- Unemployment: ▲4.9% (2025)
- Youth unemployment: ▲9.0% (2025)
- Average gross salary: CHF 8,286 / €8,854 monthly (2024)
- Average net salary: CHF 6,798 / €7,265 monthly (2024)
- Main industries: Machinery; chemicals; watches; textiles; precision instruments; tourism; banking; insurance; pharmaceuticals

External
- Exports: $468.7 billion (2020) (Note: trade data exclude trade with Switzerland)
- Export goods: Machinery, chemicals, metals, watches, agricultural products
- Main export partners: Germany 15.2%; United States 12.3%; China 8.2%; India 6.7%; France 5.7%; United Kingdom 5.7%; (2017)
- Imports: $291.1 billion (2020)
- Import goods: Machinery, chemicals, vehicles, metals, agricultural products, textiles
- Main import partners: Germany 20.9%; United States 7.9%; Italy 7.6%; United Kingdom 7.3%; France 6.8%; China 5%; India 4.1%; (2017)
- FDI stock: $1.489 trillion (31 December 2017 est.); Abroad: $1.701 trillion (31 December 2017 est.)
- Current account: $66.55 billion (2017 est.)
- Gross external debt: $1.664 trillion (31 March 2016 est.)

Public finance
- Government debt: 41.8% of GDP (2017 est.) (Note: general government gross debt; gross debt consists of all liabilities that require payment or payments of interest and/or principal by the debtor to the creditor at a date or dates in the future; includes debt liabilities in the form of Special Drawing Rights (SDRs), currency and deposits, debt securities, loans, insurance, pensions and standardized guarantee schemes, and other accounts payable; all liabilities in the GFSM (Government Financial Systems Manual) 2001 system are debt, except for equity and investment fund shares and financial derivatives and employee stock options)
- Foreign reserves: $1.25 trillion (January 2023) (3rd)
- Budget balance: 1.1% (of GDP) (2017 est.)
- Revenue: 242.1 billion (2017 est.)
- Spending: 234.4 billion (2017 est.) (Note: Includes federal, cantonal and municipal accounts)
- Economic aid: Donor: ODA 3 billion CHF (0.50% of GDP)
- Credit rating: Standard & Poor's: AAA (Domestic); AAA (Foreign); AAA (T&C Assessment); Outlook: Stable; Moody's: Aaa; Outlook: Stable; Fitch: AAA; Outlook: Stable; Scope: AAA; Outlook: Stable
- All values, unless otherwise stated, are in US dollars.

Switzerland has a highly developed free-market economy. The Swiss economy has ranked first in the world on the Global Innovation Index in 2026, holding the title consecutively since 2019 and third in the 2020 Global Competitiveness Report. According to United Nations data for 2016, it is the third richest landlocked country in the world after Liechtenstein and Luxembourg. Together with the latter and Norway, they are the only three countries in the world with a nominal GDP per capita above US$90,000 that are neither island nations nor ministates. Among OECD nations, Switzerland holds the 3rd-largest GDP per capita. Switzerland has a highly efficient and strong social security system; social expenditure stood at roughly 24.1% of GDP.

== History ==
=== 19th century ===
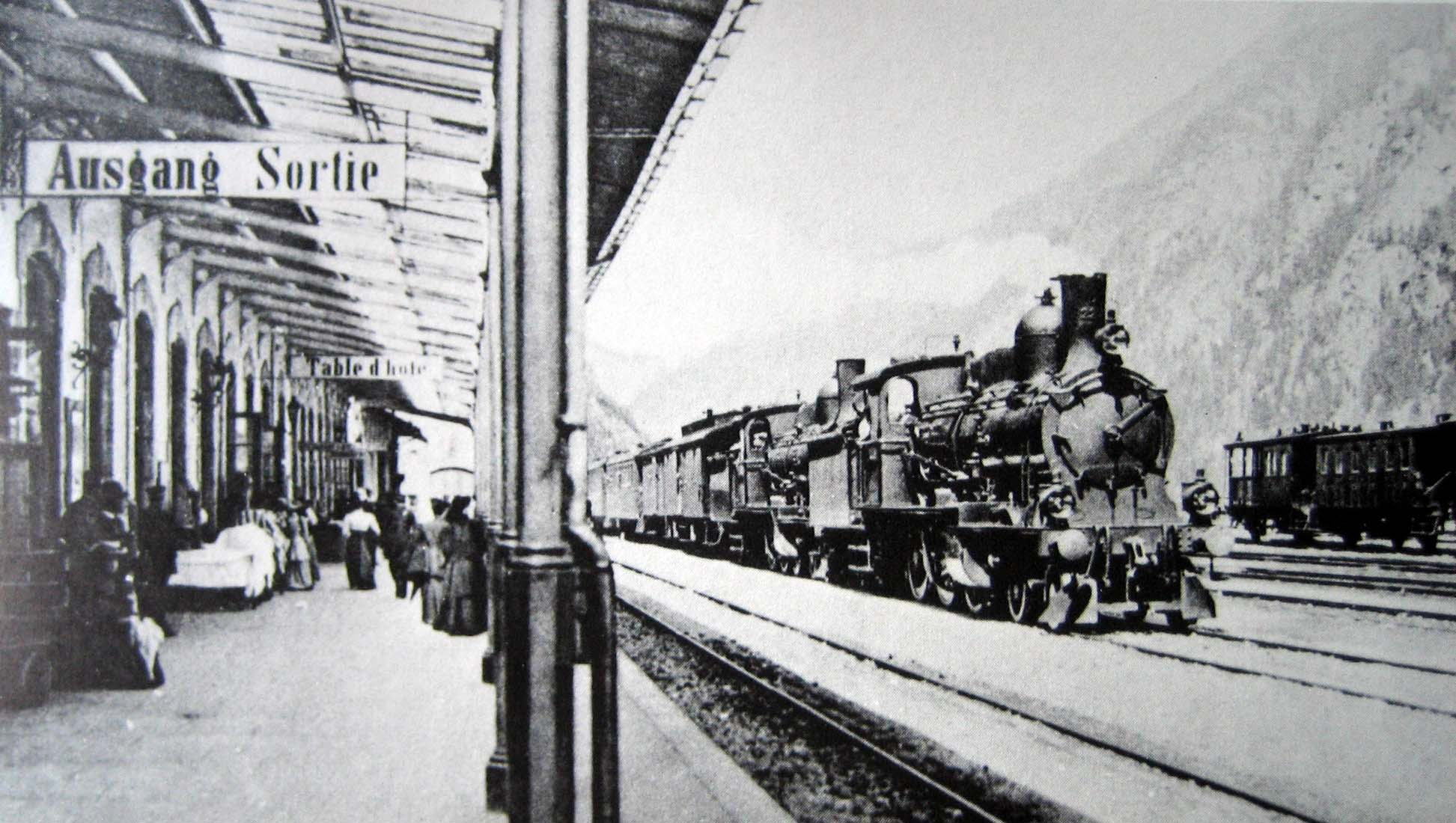
Gotthard line in 1882

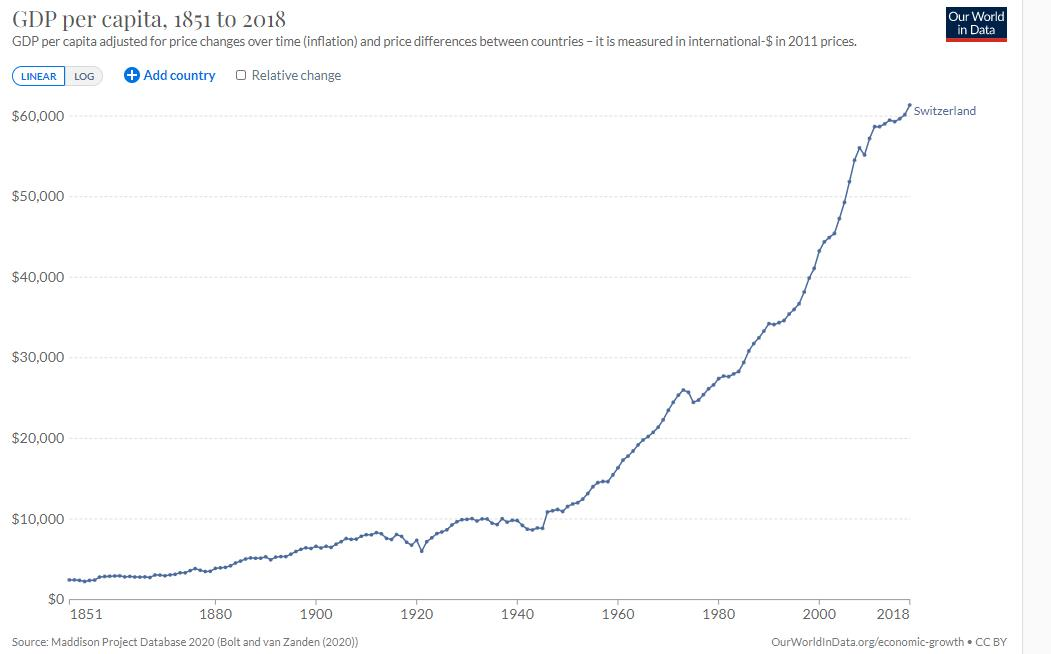
Development of real GDP per capita, 1851 to 2018

Switzerland as a federal state was established in 1848. Before that time, the city-cantons of Zürich, Geneva, and Basel in particular began to develop economically based on industry and trade, while the rural regions of Switzerland remained poor and underdeveloped. While a workshop system had been in existence throughout the early modern period, the production of machines began in 1801 in St. Gallen, with the third generation of machines imported from Great Britain. But in Switzerland, hydraulic power was often used instead of steam engines because of the country's mountainous topography and lack of significant deposits of coal. By 1814, hand weaving had been mostly replaced by the power loom. Both tourism and banking began to develop as economic factors at about the same time. While Switzerland was primarily rural, the cities experienced an industrial revolution in the late 19th century, focused especially on textiles. In Basel, for example, textiles, including silk, were the leading industry. In 1888, women made up 44% of wage earners. Nearly half the women worked in the textile mills, with household servants the second largest job category. The proportion of women in the workforce was higher between 1890 and 1910 than it was in the late 1960s and 1970s.

Railways played a major part in industrialization; the first railway opened in 1847, between Zürich and Baden. Despite the competition between private players, Switzerland was covered with more than 1000 km of track by 1860. Nevertheless, the network was barely coordinated because of the decentralised system.

=== 20th century ===
The industrial sector began to grow in the 19th century with a laissez-faire industrial/trade policy, Switzerland's emergence as one of the most prosperous nations in Europe, sometimes termed the "Swiss miracle", was a development of the mid 19th to early 20th centuries, among other things tied to the role of Switzerland during the World Wars.

Switzerland's total energy consumption, which was dropping from the mid-1910s to the early 1920s, started to increase again in the early 1920s. It stagnated during the 1930s before falling again during the early 1940s; but rapid growth started once again in the mid-1940s.

In the 1940s, particularly during World War II, the economy profited from the increased export and delivery of weapons to Germany, France, the United Kingdom, and other European countries. However, Switzerland's energy consumption decreased rapidly. The co-operation of the banks with the Nazis (although they also co-operated extensively with the British and French) and their commercial relations with the Axis powers during the war were later sharply criticised, resulting in a short period of international isolation of Switzerland. Switzerland's production facilities were largely undamaged by the war, and afterwards both imports and exports grew rapidly.

In the 1950s, annual GDP growth averaged 5% and Switzerland's energy consumption nearly doubled. Coal lost its rank as Switzerland's primary energy source, as other imported fossil fuels, such as crude and refined oil and natural and refined gas, increased.

In the 1960s, annual GDP growth averaged 4% and Switzerland's total energy consumption nearly doubled again. By the end of the decade oil provided over three-quarters of Switzerland's energy.

In the 1970s the GDP growth rate gradually declined from a peak of 6.5% in 1970; GDP then contracted by 7.5% in 1975 and 1976. Switzerland became increasingly dependent on oil imported from its main suppliers, the OPEC cartel. The 1973 international oil crisis caused Switzerland's energy consumption to decrease in the years from 1973 to 1978. In 1974 there were three nationwide car-free Sundays when private transport was prohibited as a result of the oil supply shock. From 1977 onwards GDP grew again, although Switzerland was also affected by the 1979 energy crisis which resulted in a short-term decrease in Switzerland's energy consumption. In 1970 industry still employed about 46% of the labor force, but during the economic recession of the 1970s the services sector grew to dominate the national economy. By 1970 17.2% of the population and about one quarter of the work force were foreign nationals, though job losses during the economic recession decreased this number.

In the 1980s, Switzerland's economy contracted by 1.3% in 1982 but grew substantially for the rest of the decade, with annual GDP growth between about 3% and 4%, apart from 1986 and 1987 when growth decreased to 1.9% and 1.6% respectively.

Switzerland's economy was marred by slow growth in the 1990s, having the weakest economic growth in Western Europe. The economy was affected by a three-year recession from 1991 to 1993, when the economy contracted by 2%. The contraction also became apparent in Switzerland's energy consumption and export growth rates. Switzerland's economy averaged no appreciable increase (only 0.6% annually) in GDP.

After enjoying unemployment rates lower than 1% before 1990, the three-year recession also caused the unemployment rate to rise to its all-time peak of 5.3% in 1997. In 2008, Switzerland was in second place among European countries with populations above one million in terms of nominal and purchasing power parity GDP per capita, behind Norway (see list). Several times in the 1990s, real wages decreased since nominal wages could not keep up with inflation. However, beginning in 1997, a global resurgence in currency movement provided the necessary stimulus to the Swiss economy. It slowly gained momentum, and peaked in the year 2000 with 3.7% growth in real terms.

=== 21st century ===
In the early 2000s recession, being so closely linked to the economies of Western Europe and the United States, Switzerland could not escape the slowdown in these countries. After the worldwide stock market crashes in the wake of the 9/11 terrorist attacks, there were more announcements of false enterprise statistics and exaggerated managers' wages. The rate of GDP growth dropped to 1.2% in 2001; 0.4% in 2002; and minus 0.2% in 2003. This economic slowdown had a noticeable impact on the labour market.

Many companies announced mass dismissals and thus the unemployment rate rose from its low of 1.6% in September 2000 to a peak of 4.3% in January 2004, although well below the European Union (EU) rate of 9.2% at the end of 2004.

On 10 November 2002 the economics magazine Cash suggested five measures for political and economic institutions to implement to revive the Swiss economy:

1. Private consumption should be promoted with decent wage increases. In addition to that, families with children should get discounts on their health insurance.

2. Switzerland's national bank should revive investments by lowering interest rates. Besides that, monetary institutions should increasingly credit consumers and offer cheaper land to be built on.

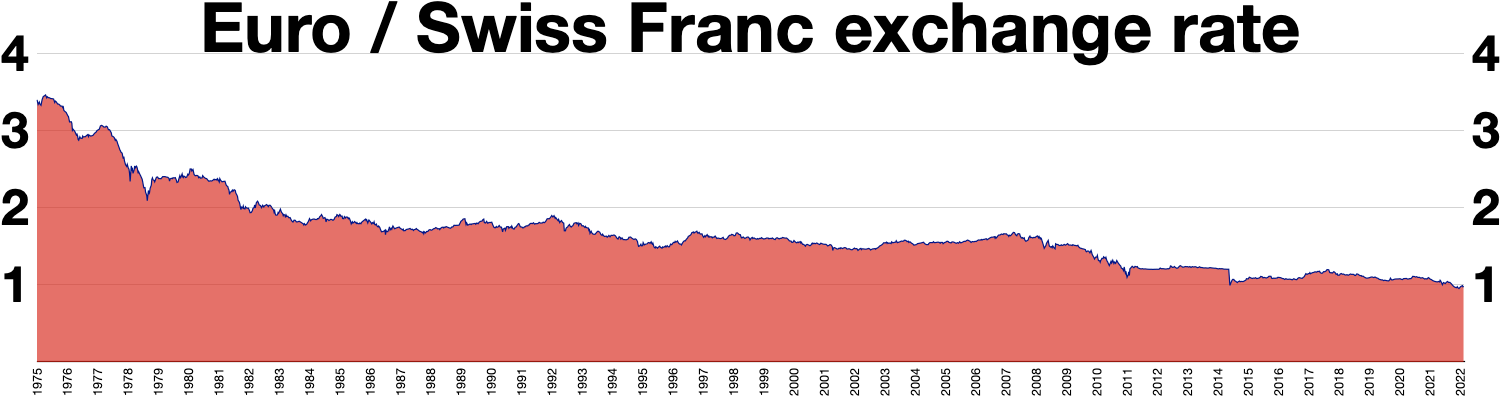
Euro to Swiss Franc exchange rate. In 2022, the Swiss National Bank reported a record loss of CHF 132 billion ($142 billion), mostly on its holdings of the Euro currency.

3. Switzerland's national bank was asked to devalue the Swiss Franc, especially compared to the Euro.

4. The government should implement the anti-cyclical measure of increasing budget deficits. Government spending should increase in the infrastructure and education sectors. Lowering taxes would make sense in order to promote private household consumption.

5. Flexible work schedules should be instituted, thus avoiding low demand dismissals.

These measures were applied with successful results while the government strove for the Magical Hexagon of full employment, social equality, economic growth, environmental quality, positive trade balance and price stability. The rebound which started in mid-2003 saw growth rate growth rate averaging 3% (2004 and 2005 saw a GDP growth of 2.5% and 2.6% respectively; for 2006 and 2007, the rate was 3.6%). In 2008, GDP growth was modest in the first half of the year while declining in the last two quarters. Because of the base effect, real growth came to 1.9%. While it contracted 1.9% in 2009, the economy started to pick up in Q3 and by the second quarter of 2010, it had surpassed its previous peak. Growth for 2010 was 2.6%

The stock market collapse of 2007-2009 deeply affected investment income earned abroad. This translated to a substantial fall in the surplus of the current account balance. In 2006, Switzerland recorded a 15.1% per GDP surplus. It went down to 9.1% in 2007 and further dropped to 1.8% in 2008. It recovered in 2009 and 2010 with a surplus of 11.9% and 14.6% respectively. Unemployment peaked in December 2009 at 4.4%. In August 2018 the unemployment rate was 2.4%.

The chart below shows the trend of the gross domestic product of Switzerland at market prices:

Year	GDP (billions of CHF)	Exchange rate (CHF per US$)
1980	184	1.67
1985	244	2.43
1990	331	1.38
1995	374	1.18
2000	422	1.68
2005	464	1.24
2006	491	1.25
2007	521	1.20
2008	547	1.08
2009	535	1.09
2010	546	1.04
2011	659	0.89
2012	632	0.94
2013	635	0.93
2014	644	0.92
2015	646	0.96
2016	659	0.98
2017	668	1.01
2018	694	1.00
2019	717	0.99
2020	750	0.94
2021	780	0.91
2022	885	0.95
2023	885	0.90

== Data ==
The following table shows the main economic indicators in 1980–2024. Inflation below 5% is in green.

Year	GDP (in bn. US$PPP)	GDP per capita (in US$PPP)	GDP (in bn. US$nominal)	GDP per capita (in US$nominal)	GDP growth (real)	Inflation rate (in %)	Unemployment (in %)	Government debt (in % of GDP)
1980	119.3	18,921.0	122.5	19,426.6	▲5.1%	▲4.0%	0.2%	n/a
1981	▲126.9	▲20,028.6	▼112.1	▼17,699.8	▲1.6%	▲6.5%	▼0.2%	n/a
1982	▲132.9	▲20,856.0	▲114.9	▲18,027.7	▼-1.3%	▲5.7%	▲0.4%	n/a
1983	▲139.0	▲21,677.9	▼114.5	▼17,865.4	▲0.6%	▲3.0%	▲0.9%	n/a
1984	▲148.4	▲23,084.4	▼109.4	▼17,019.4	▲3.1%	▲2.9%	▲1.1%	n/a
1985	▲158.8	▲24,591.4	▲111.0	▲17,187.9	▲3.7%	▲3.4%	▼1.0%	n/a
1986	▲164.9	▲25,433.0	▲159.1	▲24,529.6	▲1.8%	▲0.7%	▼0.8%	n/a
1987	▲171.6	▲26,309.8	▲199.1	▲30,520.6	▲1.5%	▲1.4%	0.8%	n/a
1988	▲183.5	▲27,943.3	▲215.4	▲32,794.3	▲3.3%	▲1.9%	▼0.7%	n/a
1989	▲199.1	▲30,083.0	▼208.1	▼31,440.4	▲4.4%	▲3.2%	▼0.6%	n/a
1990	▲214.3	▲32,105.6	▲265.9	▲39,842.8	▲3.7%	▲5.4%	▼0.5%	33.3%
1991	▲219.5	▲32,479.1	▲269.0	▼39,811.0	▼-0.9%	▲5.9%	▲1.1%	▲35.1%
1992	▲224.1	▲32,754.3	▲279.8	▲40,883.2	▼-0.1%	▲4.0%	▲2.5%	▲39.5%
1993	▲229.1	▲33,167.1	▼272.0	▼39,375.5	▼-0.1%	▲3.3%	▲4.5%	▲44.4%
1994	▲237.1	▲34,015.9	▲301.2	▲43,226.5	▲1.3%	▲0.9%	▲4.7%	▲47.1%
1995	▲243.4	▲34,675.3	▲353.0	▲50,287.8	▲0.6%	▲1.8%	▼4.2%	▲50.0%
1996	▲249.0	▲35,259.4	▼340.2	▼48,171.7	▲0.5%	▲0.8%	▲4.7%	▲51.3%
1997	▲258.9	▲36,567.3	▼294.7	▼41,623.1	▲2.2%	▲0.5%	▲5.2%	▲53.7%
1998	▲269.5	▲37,982.7	▲303.1	▲42,719.7	▲2.9%	▲0.0%	▼3.9%	▲56.0%
1999	▲277.8	▲38,999.4	▼297.5	▼41,765.2	▲1.7%	▲0.8%	▼2.7%	▼52.7%
2000	▲295.7	▲41,280.3	▼279.2	▼38,970.2	▲4.1%	▲1.6%	▼1.8%	▼52.2%
2001	▲307.3	▲42,698.6	▲286.7	▲39,832.2	▲1.6%	▲1.0%	▼1.7%	▼51.1%
2002	▲311.9	▲42,990.1	▲309.5	▲42,656.6	▼-0.1%	▲0.6%	▲2.5%	▲57.7%
2003	▲317.8	▲43,454.0	▲362.1	▲49,512.2	▼-0.1%	▲0.6%	▲3.7%	▼56.9%
2004	▲334.7	▲45,448.7	▲403.4	▲54,782.3	▲2.6%	▲0.8%	▲3.9%	▲57.8%
2005	▲354.9	▲47,868.9	▲418.1	▲56,379.1	▲2.8%	▲1.2%	▼3.8%	▼54.9%
2006	▲381.1	▲51,093.4	▲441.7	▲59,212.3	▲4.2%	▲1.1%	▼3.3%	▼48.5%
2007	▲406.8	▲54,171.9	▲490.8	▲65,364.9	▲3.9%	▲0.7%	▼2.8%	▼44.8%
2008	▲425.7	▲56,069.3	▲566.9	▲74,664.6	▲2.7%	▲2.4%	▼2.6%	44.8%
2009	▼418.6	▼54,346.1	▼553.7	▼71,886.6	▼-2.3%	▲-0.5%	▲3.7%	▼43.1%
2010	▲437.2	▲56,157.5	▲598.2	▲76,830.1	▲3.2%	▲0.7%	▼3.5%	▼41.5%
2011	▲454.8	▲57,785.8	▲715.7	▲90,936.6	▲1.9%	▲0.2%	▼2.8%	▲41.9%
2012	▲475.3	▲59,748.6	▼686.4	▼86,280.5	▲1.2%	▲-0.7%	▲2.9%	▲42.6%
2013	▲498.9	▲62,058.4	▲706.4	▲87,873.4	▲1.8%	▲-0.2%	▲3.2%	▼42.0%
2014	▲519.4	▲63,806.8	▲726.7	▲89,270.3	▲2.3%	▲0.0%	▼3.0%	▲42.1%
2015	▲540.5	▲65,779.4	▼693.9	▼84,229.4	▲1.6%	▲-1.1%	▲3.2%	▲42.2%
2016	▲558.5	▲67,065.6	▼687.6	▼82,570.7	▲2.1%	▲-0.4%	▲3.3%	▼40.9%
2017	▲576.6	▲68,481.3	▲695.3	▲82,576.4	▲1.4%	▲0.5%	▼3.1%	▲41.8%
2018	▲602.1	▲70,974.5	▲725.8	▲85,561.0	▲2.9%	▲0.9%	▼2.5%	▼39.8%
2019	▲632.7	▲74,042.1	▼721.9	▼84,481.0	▲1.2%	▲0.4%	▼2.3%	▼39.6%
2020	▼630.1	▼73,212.3	▲739.0	▲86,138.9	▼-2.3%	▲-0.7%	▲3.2%	▲43.3%
2021	▲711.4	▲82,057.3	▲814.7	▲93,966.5	▲5.6%	▲0.6%	▼3.0%	▼41.0%
2022	▲785.9	▲89,933.4	▲828.4	▲94,798.8	▲3.1%	▲2.8%	▼2.2%	▼37.2%
2023	▲820.3	▲93,054.8	▲894.8	▲101,510.0	▲0.7%	▲2.1%	▼2.0%	▼33.3%
2024	▲851.1	▲95,836.6	▲942.3	▲106,097.6	▲1.3%	▲1.3%	▲2.4%	▼31.9%

== Economic sectors ==
Origin of the capital at the 30 biggest Swiss corporations, 2018. The majority of large Swiss companies have foreign CEOs.
1. Switzerland (39.0%)
2. North America (33.0%)
3. Europe (24.0%)
4. Rest of the world (4.00%)

The Swiss economy follows the typical developed country model with respect to the economic sectors. Only a small minority of the workers are involved in the primary or agricultural sector (1.3% of the population, in 2006) while a larger minority is involved in the secondary or manufacturing sector (27.7% in 2012). The majority of the working population are involved in the tertiary or services sector of the economy (71.0% in 2012).

Top 5 retail e-commerce sites in Switzerland by revenue in 2025 (% of CHF14.2 billion total turnover).
1. Galaxus (galaxus.ch) (16.2%)
2. Zalando (zalando.ch) (12.8%)
3. Digitec (digitec.ch) (7.40%)
4. Temu (temu.com/ch) (7.00%)
5. Amazon (amazon.de) (6.70%)
6. All 10 others (49.9%)

=== Industrial sector ===
Switzerland has an extensive industrial sector, with globally competitive companies in various industrial sectors. Most noticeably, food processing like Nestlé, machines and robot manufacturers such as ABB, Bobst SA and Stadler Rail, chemicals for industrial and construction use like Sika AG, or military equipment such as Ruag.

Switzerland also has one of the most competitive pharmaceutical industries in the world. Major Swiss pharmaceutical companies include Novartis and Roche.

=== Agriculture ===
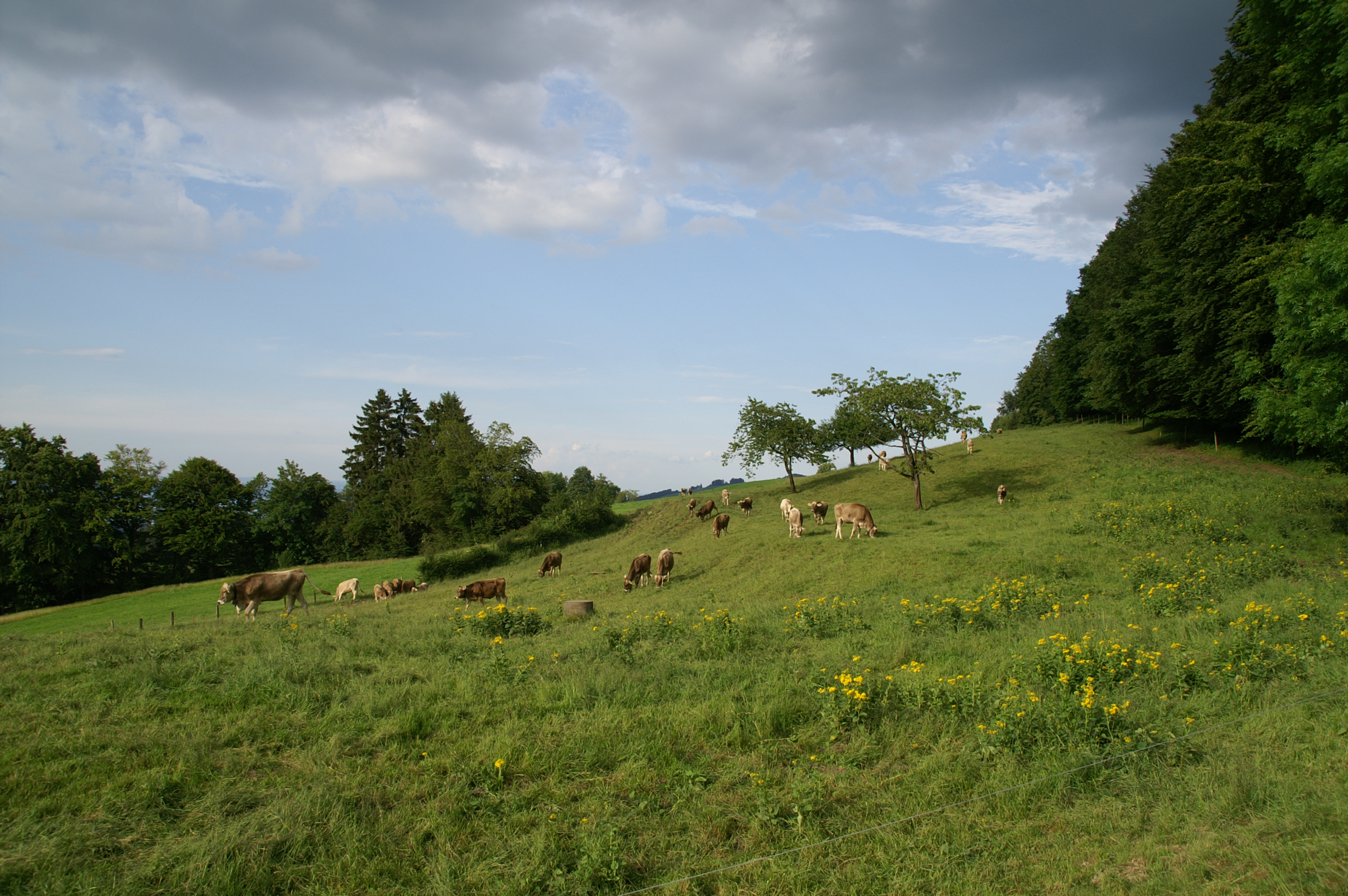
Swiss free-range cattle

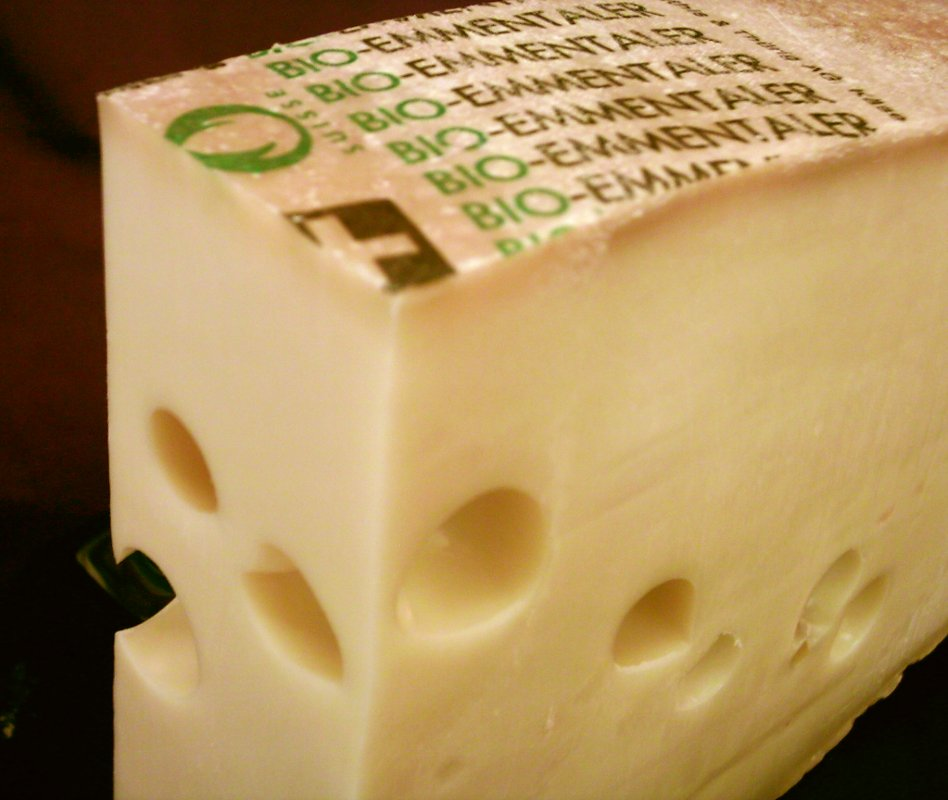
Emmentaler cheese. While some Swiss types are AOP restricted, generic Emmentaler is produced around the world.

Switzerland is highly protective of its agricultural industry. High tariffs and extensive domestic subsidisations encourage domestic production, which currently produces about 60% of the food consumed in the country. Cheeses and dairy are emblematic products of Swiss agriculture. Wine is another.

According to the Organisation for Economic Co-operation and Development (OECD), Switzerland is subsidising more than 70% of its agriculture compared to 35% in the EU. The 2007 Agricultural Program increased subsidies by CHF 63 million to CHF 14.092 billion.

Protectionism acts to promote domestic production, but not to reduce prices or the cost of production, and there is no guarantee the increased domestic production is actually consumed internally; it may simply be exported, to the profit of the producers. 90 to 100% of potatoes, vegetables, pork, veal, cattle and most milk products are produced in the country. Beyond that, Swiss agriculture meets 65% of the domestic food demand. In 2016 the Swiss government spent about 5.5% of its total budget (over CHF 3.5 billion) on supporting food production.

The first reform in agricultural policies was in 1993. Among other changes, since 1998 Switzerland has linked the attribution of farm subsidies with the strict observance of good environmental practice. Before farmers can apply for subsidies, they must obtain certificates of environmental management systems (EMS) proving that they: "make a balanced use of fertilizers; use at least 7% of their farmland as ecological compensation areas; regularly rotate crops; adopt appropriate measures to protect animals and soil; make limited and targeted use of pesticides." 1,500 farms are driven out of business each year. But the number of organic farms increased by 3.3 percent between 2003 and 2004, and organic sales increased by 7 percent to $979 million. Moreover, Swiss consumers consider less important the drawback of higher prices for organic food compared to conventional locally produced food.

=== Tourism ===
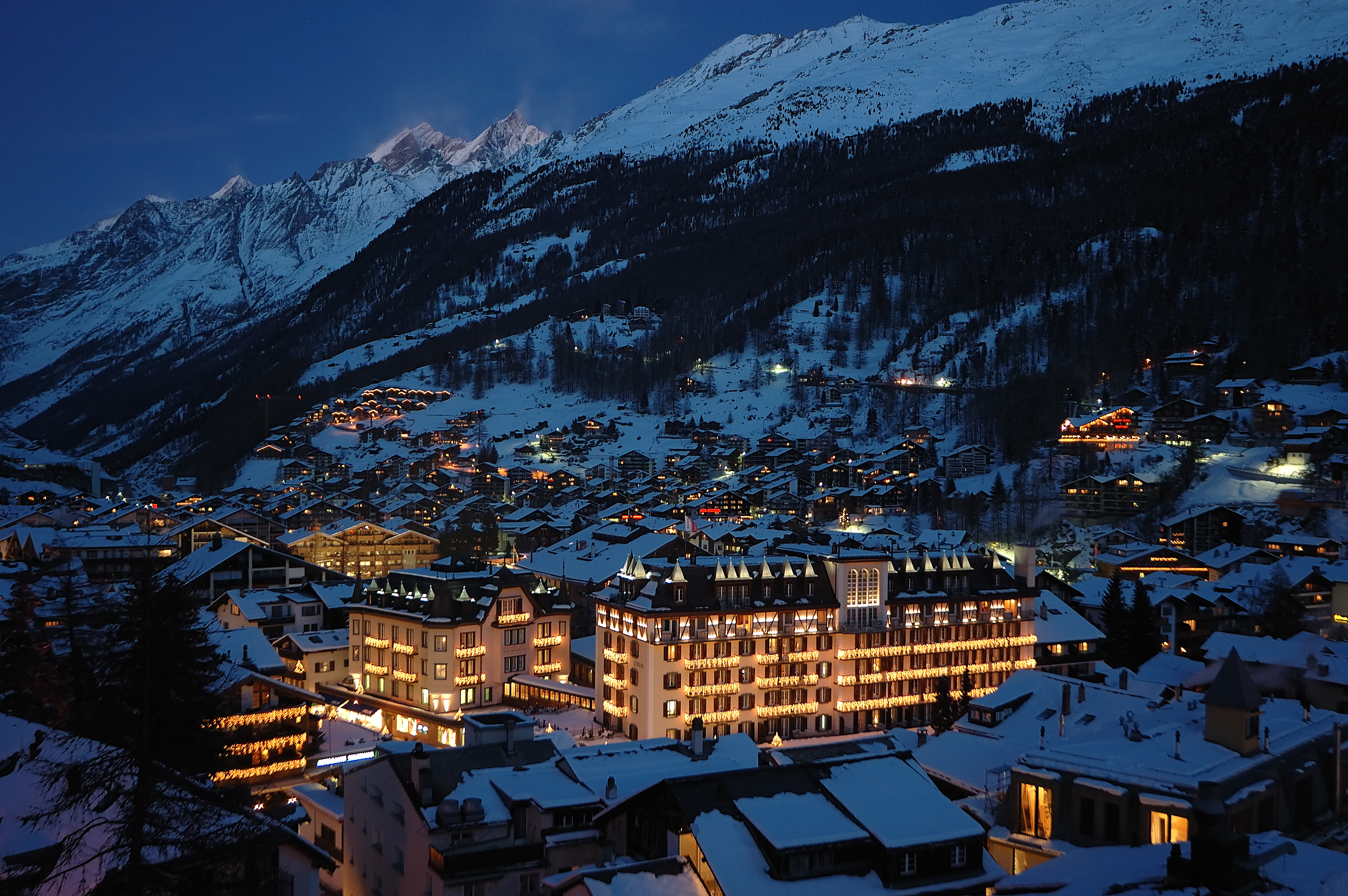
The Mont Cervin Palace in Zermatt

Switzerland has highly developed tourism infrastructure, especially in the mountainous regions and cities, making it a good market for tourism-related equipment and services.

14% of hotels were in Grisons, 12% each in the Valais and Eastern Switzerland, 11% in Central Switzerland and 9% in the Bernese Oberland. The ratio of lodging nights in relation to resident population ("tourism intensity", a measure for the relative importance of tourism to local economy) was largest in Grisons (8.3) and Bernese Oberland (5.3), compared to a Swiss average of 1.3. 56.4% of lodging nights were by visitors from abroad (broken down by nationality: 16.5% Germany, 6.3% UK, 4.8% USA, 3.6% France, 3.0% Italy)

The total financial volume associated with tourism, including transportation, is estimated to CHF 35.5 billion (as of 2010) although some of this comes from fuel tax and sales of motorway vignettes. The total gross value added from tourism is 14.9 billion. Tourism provides a total of 144,838 full time equivalent jobs in the entire country. The total financial volume of tourist lodging is 5.19 billion CHF and eating at the lodging provides an additional 5.19 billion. The total gross value added of 14.9 billion is about 2.9% of Switzerland's 2010 nominal GDP of 550.57 billion CHF.

=== Banking and finance ===
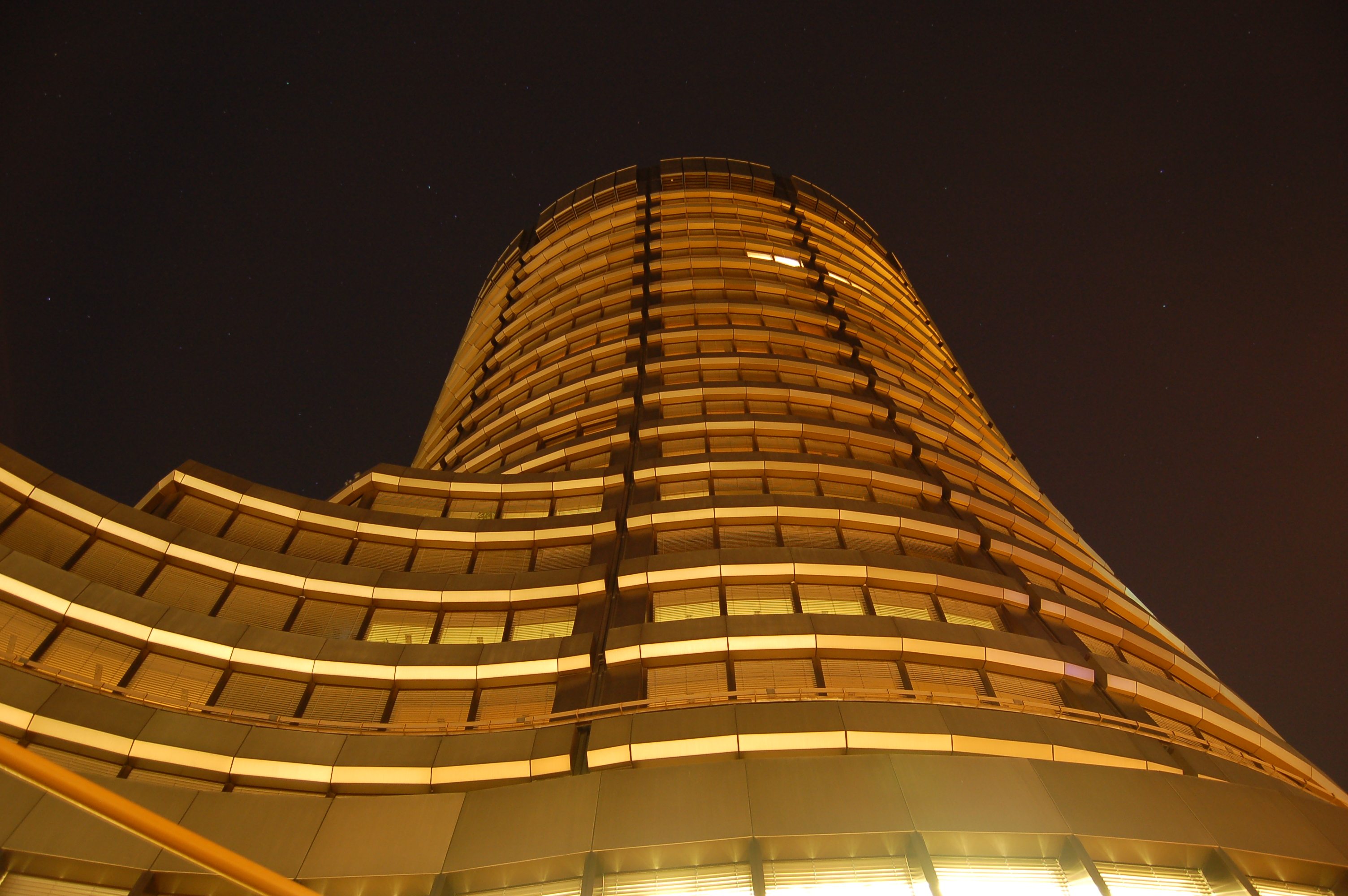
The Bank for International Settlements in Basel

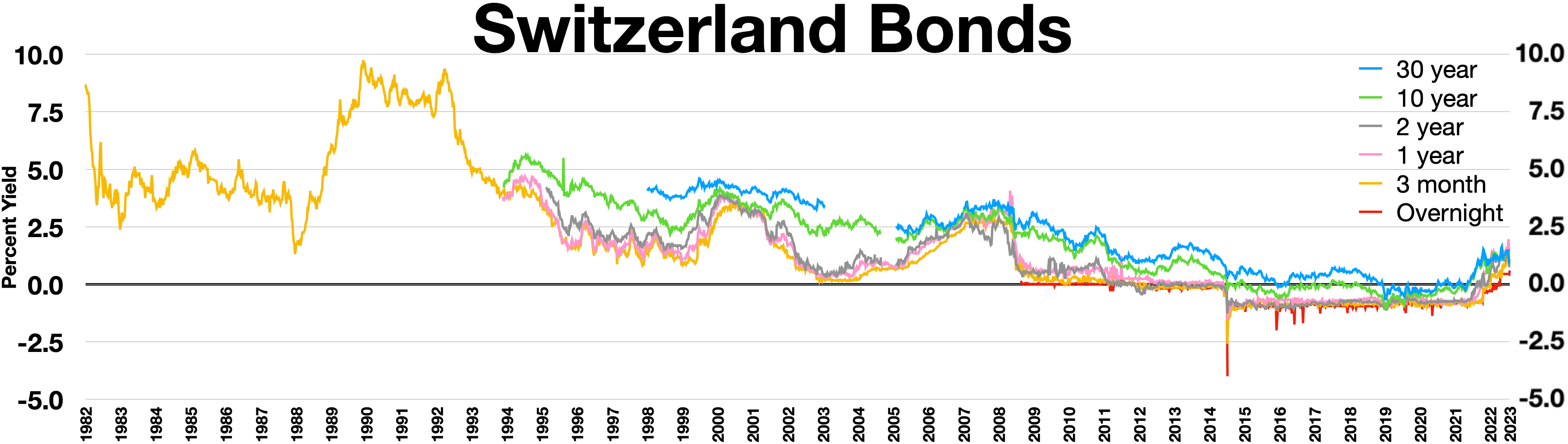
Switzerland bonds 30 year 10 year 2 year 1 year 3 month Overnight

In 2003, the financial sector comprised an estimated 11.6% of Switzerland's GDP and employed approximately 196,000 people (136,000 of whom work in the banking sector); this represents about 5.6% of the total Swiss workforce.

Swiss neutrality and national sovereignty, long recognized by foreign nations, have fostered a stable environment in which the banking sector was able to develop and thrive. Switzerland has maintained neutrality through both World Wars, is not a member of the European Union, and was not even a member of the United Nations until 2002. Currently an estimated 28 percent of all funds held outside the country of origin (sometimes called "offshore" funds) are kept in Switzerland. In 2009 Swiss banks managed 5.4 trillion Swiss Francs.

Most of the financial sector is centred in Zürich and Geneva. Zürich specialises in banking (UBS, Credit Suisse, Julius Baer) as well as insurance (Swiss Re, Zurich Insurance), whilst Geneva specialises in wealth management (Pictet Group, Lombard Odier, Union Bancaire Privée), and commodity trading, trade finance, and shipping (Cargill, Mediterranean Shipping Company, Louis Dreyfus Company, Mercuria Energy Group, Trafigura, Banque de Commerce et de Placements).

The Bank of International Settlements, an organization that facilitates cooperation among the world's central banks, is headquartered in the city of Basel. Founded in 1930, the BIS chose to locate in Switzerland because of the country's neutrality, which was important to an organization founded by countries that had been on both sides of World War I. In May 2006, foreign banks operating in Switzerland managed 870 billion Swiss francs worth of assets. In 2014, this number was estimated to be 960 billion Swiss francs.

In 2023, Switzerland lost credibility as a banking system after the collapse of Credit Suisse, acquired by the Swiss competitor UBS, and the way the affair was handled by the Swiss National Bank.

==== Connection to illegal activities ====
Swiss banks have served as safe havens for the wealth of dictators, despots, mobsters, arms dealers, corrupt officials, and tax cheats of all kinds.

=== Commodities trading ===
Switzerland is a major global hub for commodities trading. Such trading represents 4% of Swiss GDP (2022). Products traded either physically or financially include agriculture, minerals, metals and oil/energy. Some 40% of all oil shipments are traded through Switzerland, along with 60% of metals and grains (2022). Alternate sources give Switzerland's share of agricultural commodities trade at 35% (2023).

10,000 persons work directly in the commodity trade business in Switzerland (with a further 35,000 indirectly): mostly around Lake Geneva, Zug and Lugano.

Corporate loans and revolving credit facilities granted to the five main Swiss energy trading houses (Glencore, Mercuria, Gunvor, Vitol and Trafigura) between 2013 and 2019 exceeded $360 billion.

Switzerland is also a major hub for gold trading. Some of the largest refiners are Valcambi, PAMP/MKS, Argor-Heraeus and Metalor.

Agricultural commodities trading is dominated by ADM, Bunge, Cargill, Cofco and Louis Dreyfus. Shipping firm MSC, logistics company Kühne + Nagel and Danzas and quality control firm SGS S.A. are also major players in this sector.

However some types of organization in commodities trading have been involved in corruption and exploitation, and operate with little or no transparency or oversight.

== Workforce ==
The Swiss economy is characterised by a skilled and generally 'peaceful' workforce. One quarter of the country's full-time workers are unionised. Labour and management relations are amicable, characterised by a willingness to settle disputes instead of resorting to labour action. They take place between trade unions and branch associations, that are themselves often grouped in Union of Employers, like the Fédération patronale vaudoise or the Fédération des Entreprises Romandes Genève. About 600 collective bargaining agreements exist today in Switzerland and are regularly renewed without major problems. However, there is no country-wide minimum wage across sectors, but some collective bargaining agreement may contain minimum wage requirements for specific sectors or employers. A May 2014 ballot initiative which would have required a Swiss minimum wage to 22 Swiss francs an hour (corresponding to a monthly income of about 4000 Swiss francs) failed to pass, gaining only 23.7% support on the ballot. On 27 September 2020 voters in the Canton of Geneva approved a minimum wage of 23 Swiss franc per hour or about 4,000 per month.

With a peak in the number of bankruptcies in 2003, however, the mood was pessimistic. Massive layoffs and dismissals by enterprises resulting from the global economic slowdown, major management scandals and different foreign investment attitudes have strained the traditional peaceful Swiss labour relations. Swiss trade unions have encouraged strikes against several companies, including Swiss International Air Lines, Coca-Cola, and Orange. Total days lost to strikes, however, remain among the lowest in the OECD.

A study estimated that Switzerland will have a shortfall of hundreds of thousands of workers by 2030. According to statistics, one in four Swiss has a second job.

== Income and wealth distribution ==
In 2013 the mean household income in Switzerland was CHF 120,624 (c. USD 134,000 nominal, US$101,000 PPP), the mean household income after social security, taxes and mandatory health insurance was CHF 85,560 (c. USD 95,000 nominal, US$72,000 PPP). The OECD lists Swiss household gross adjusted disposable income per capita US$32,594 PPP for 2011.

As of 2016, Switzerland had the highest average wealth per adult, at $561,900. The top 1% richest persons own 35% of all the wealth (2015). This increased to 42% in 2023. According to the UBS Global Wealth Report in 2026, Swiss adults have an average wealth equivalent to $910,382 (CHF733,000), ahead of the U.S. and Luxembourg, while the median wealth is only $145,555. This number is an "average" and does not account for the expanding gap in wealth distribution in Switzerland, according to the same report.

The "net wealth" of Switzerland was $5.4 trillion as measured by the net worth of its richest citizens. Among this group are 740 super-rich people with assets of at least $100 million. Switzerland has 580,000 millionaires in total, which is 60,000 more than Germany, whose population is about 10 times larger.

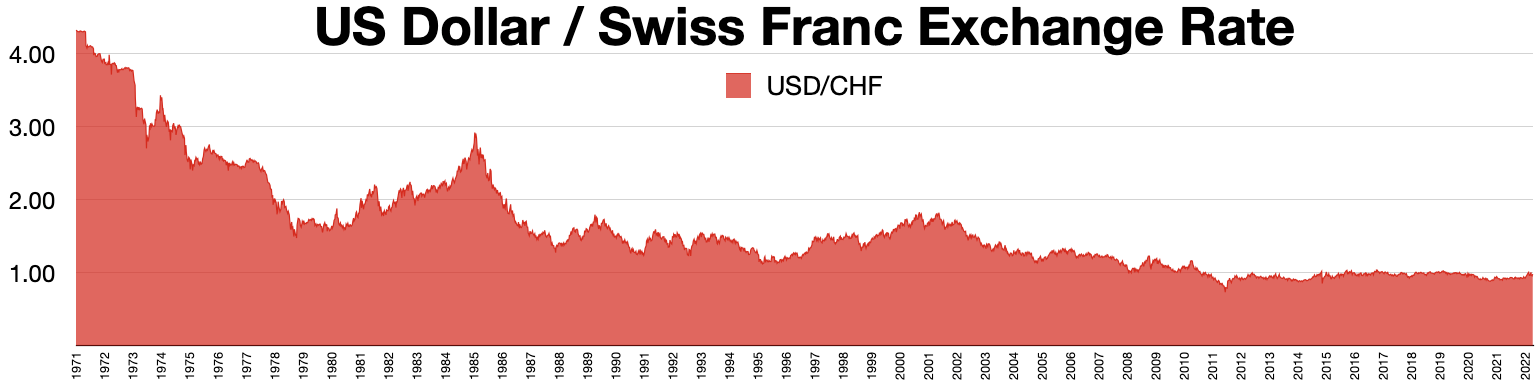
US Dollar / Swiss Franc exchange rate

This wealth was assisted by the exchange rate movements between the US Dollar and the Swiss franc, which caused capital in Swiss francs to more than double its value in dollar terms during the 2000s and especially during the 2008 financial crisis, without any direct increase in value in terms of domestic purchasing power.

The high average wealth is determined by the few who are extremely wealthy; the median (50th percentile) wealth of Swiss adults is five times lower than the average, at US$100,900 (US$70,000 PPP as of 2011).

The Statistical Office defines the majority of the population as “neither rich nor poor and the average Swiss earns just enough to afford the high cost of living in Switzerland”. According to some Swiss statistics "28% [of Swiss families] have nothing left to save at the end of the month".

As of 2022, one in seven Swiss pensioners was living in poverty. Some 46,000 Swiss pensioners have already fallen into poverty and a further 295,000 are in danger of joining them. The official poverty line is drawn at CHF2,279 ($2,300) per month to pay for rent, health insurance, clothes and food.

About 8.2% of the population live below the national poverty line, defined in Switzerland as earning less than CHF3,990 per month for a household of two adults and two children, and a further 15% are at risk of poverty.

Income and wealth distribution in Switzerland reflects a high-income economy with relatively moderate inequality and strong social outcomes. The Swiss Federal Statistical Office reports a Gini coefficient of 31.5 in 2023, a level that has remained stable over the past decade and indicates balanced income dispersion for a market-oriented system. Switzerland's wage structure is supported by coordinated wage negotiations, extensive vocational training, and high labor force participation, which contribute to low unemployment and broadly shared earnings. Extreme poverty is nearly nonexistent, although national poverty rates slightly above 15 percent reflect high living costs rather than severe material deprivation. Wealth inequality is more pronounced due to the concentration of financial assets, but broad household access to occupational pensions and mandatory private savings reduces disparities in retirement security. Taken together, Switzerland's institutional framework, labor market design, and targeted social programs support relatively equitable income distribution despite limited reliance on expansive welfare spending.

Unlike France and Spain, Switzerland has one of the lowest homeownership rates in Europe (around 36%).

== Trade ==
Exports of Switzerland by product category (2019) Chemical products Transportation Machines Mineral products Plastics and rubbers Metals Foodstuffs Precious metals Textiles Instruments Animal products Vegetable products Paper goods Footwear and headwear Miscellaneous Stone and glass Wood products Animal and vegetable bi-products Animal hides Arts and antiques Weapons

The CIA World Factbook estimates Switzerland's 2011 exports at $308.3 billion and the 2010 exports at $258.5 billion. Imports are estimated to be $299.6 billion in 2011 and $246.2 billion in 2010. According to the World Factbook numbers, Switzerland is the 20th largest exporter and the 18th largest importer.

The United Nations Commodity Trade Statistics Database has lower numbers for Switzerland's exports and imports. The UN calculates exports at $223.5 billion in 2011 and $185.8 billion in 2010. The value of all imports in 2011 was $197.0 billion and in 2010 it was $166.9 billion.

Switzerland's largest trading partner is Germany. In 2017, 17% of Switzerland's exports and 20% of its imports came from Germany. The United States was the second largest destination of exports (10% of total exports) and the second largest source of imports (7.8%). China was the third largest destination of exports (9.2%) but only provided 4.8% of imports.

The next largest destinations of exports include India (7.3%), France (5.4%), Hong Kong (5.4%), the United Kingdom (4.5%) and Italy (4.4%). Other major sources of imports include: Italy (7.6%), the United Kingdom (7.1%), France (6.0%), China (mentioned above), the United Arab Emirates (3.7%) and Hong Kong (3.4%).

As a developed country with a skilled labor force, the majority of Swiss exports are precision or 'high tech' finished products. Switzerland's largest specific SITC categories of exports include medicaments (13%), heterocyclic compounds (2.2%), watches (6.4%), orthopaedic appliances (2.1%), and precious jewellery (2.5%). While watches and jewellery remained an important part of the economy, in 2017 about 24% of Swiss exports were gold bullion or coins. Agricultural products that Switzerland is famous for such as cheese (0.23%), wine (0.028%), and chocolate (0.35%) all make up only a small portion of Swiss exports. Switzerland is also a significant exporter of arms and ammunition, and the third largest for small calibers which accounted for 0.33% of the total exports in 2012.

Switzerland's main imports include gold (21%), medicaments (7.4%), cars (4.0%), precious jewellery (3.7%), and other unclassified transactions (18%). While Switzerland has a long tradition of manufacturing cars, there are currently no large-scale assembly line automobile manufacturers in the country.

Top 25 imports and exports for Switzerland for 2017

Top 25 Imports into Switzerland for 2017
Ranking	SITC4	Product names (SITC)	Value (billion USD)	%
1	9710	Gold	52.96	21.0%
2	9310	Unclassified Transactions	46.33	18.0%
3	5417	Medicaments	18.69	7.4%
4	7810	Cars	9.98	4.0%
5	8973	Precious Jewellery	9.19	3.7%
6	6672	Diamonds	3.13	1.2%
7	8960	Artwork	3.05	1.2%
8	5156	Heterocyclic Compounds	2.59	1.0%
9	8851	Watches	2.47	1.0%
10	7643	TV and Radio Transmitters	2.38	1.0%
11	8510	Footwear	2.12	0.8%
12	7721	Circuit Breakers and Panels	2.02	0.8%
13	8996	Orthopedic Devices	1.91	0.8%
14	8720	Medical Instruments	1.72	0.7%
15	7284	Machinery for Specialized Industries	1.71	0.7%
16	8219	Miscellaneous Furniture	1.67	0.7%
17	8939	Miscellaneous Articles of Plastic	1.61	0.6%
18	3510	Electric Current	1.58	0.6%
19	3330	Crude Petroleum	1.56	0.6%
20	5989	Chemical Products	1.51	0.6%
21	5530	Perfumery and Cosmetics	1.23	0.5%
22	6842	Processed Aluminium	1.23	0.5%
23	7821	Trucks and Vans	1.19	0.5%
24	7932	Ships and Boats	1.15	0.5%
25	7924	Large Aircraft	1.10	0.4%

Top 25 exports from Switzerland for 2017
Ranking	SITC4	Product names (SITC)	Value (billion USD)	%
1	9710	Gold	69.04	24.0%
2	9310	Unclassified Transactions	54.97	19.0%
3	5417	Medicaments	36.64	13.0%
4	8851	Watches	18.63	6.4%
5	8973	Precious Jewellery	7.27	2.5%
6	5156	Heterocyclic Compounds	6.29	2.2%
7	8996	Orthopedic Devices	5.99	2.1%
8	7284	Machinery for Specialized Industries	4.24	1.5%
9	7721	Circuit Breakers and Panels	3.45	1.2%
10	8720	Medical Instruments	2.74	1.0%
11	711	Coffee	2.34	0.8%
12	8960	Artwork	2.02	0.7%
13	7492	Valves	1.82	0.6%
14	6672	Diamonds	1.78	0.6%
15	5514	Scented Mixtures	1.68	0.6%
16	5530	Perfumery and Cosmetics	1.67	0.6%
17	1110	Miscellaneous Beverages	1.58	0.6%
18	6842	Processed Aluminium	1.49	0.5%
19	7149	Parts of Gas Turbines and Reaction Engines	1.37	0.5%
20	7849	Vehicles Parts and Accessories	1.32	0.5%
21	5147	Amide Function Compounds	1.30	0.5%
22	7452	Miscellaneous Non-Electrical Machines	1.28	0.4%
23	8939	Miscellaneous Articles of Plastic	1.27	0.4%
24	5989	Chemical Products	1.23	0.4%
25	5413	Antibiotics	1.14	0.4%

Top 25 trading partners for Switzerland for 2017

Top 25 trading partners importing into Switzerland for 2017
Ranking	Country	Value (billion USD)	%
1	Germany	54.61	20.0%
2	USA	21.30	7.8%
3	Italy	20.70	7.6%
4	United Kingdom	19.26	7.1%
5	France	16.45	6.0%
6	China	13.22	4.8%
7	United Arab Emirates	9.98	3.7%
8	Hong Kong	9.34	3.4%
9	Ireland	7.73	2.8%
10	Austria	7.70	2.8%
11	Belgium-Luxembourg	5.76	2.1%
12	Japan	5.69	2.1%
13	Spain	5.37	2.0%
14	Netherlands	5.24	1.9%
15	Thailand	4.32	1.6%
16	Uzbekistan	3.68	1.3%
17	Zambia	3.64	1.3%
18	Czech Republic	2.54	0.9%
19	Peru	2.47	0.9%
20	Poland	2.39	0.9%
21	Russia	2.32	0.9%
22	South Africa	2.32	0.9%
23	Singapore	2.01	0.7%
24	Canada	1.98	0.7%
25	Ghana	1.84	0.7%

Top 25 trading partners exporting from Switzerland for 2017
Ranking	Country	Value (billion USD)	%
1	Germany	48.15	17.0%
2	USA	28.37	10.0%
3	China	26.15	9.2%
4	India	20.89	7.3%
5	Hong Kong	15.52	5.4%
6	France	15.27	5.4%
7	United Kingdom	12.91	4.5%
8	Italy	12.56	4.4%
9	Austria	8.81	3.1%
10	Japan	7.58	2.7%
11	Singapore	7.45	2.6%
12	Turkey	6.73	2.4%
13	Belgium-Luxembourg	6.45	2.3%
14	Israel	4.67	1.6%
15	Spain	4.31	1.5%
16	Netherlands	4.00	1.4%
17	United Arab Emirates	3.98	1.4%
18	Thailand	3.59	1.3%
19	Canada	3.39	1.2%
20	South Korea	2.93	1.0%
21	Malaysia	2.72	1.0%
22	Russia	2.29	0.8%
23	Brazil	1.98	0.7%
24	Other Asia	1.86	0.7%
25	Saudi Arabia	1.84	0.7%

== Economic policy ==
=== Recent economic measures ===
On 6 June 2025, following the collapse and following UBS takeover of Credit Suisse, the Federal Council outlined a series of amendments to existing legislation, aiming to prevent such a crisis from happening again. This collection of proposed amendments, called "Too Big To Fail measures", is specifically intended to address the risks caused by banks and other institutions that are critical to Swiss and global financial infrastructure. The four banks that are currently deemed "systemically important banks" are UBS, Postfinance, Raiffeisen, and the Zurich Cantonal Bank. Among the proposed measures is a requirement to fully finance the purchase of and continued involvement in foreign subsidiaries with capital, rather than partially using debt as is the current standard. An expert report was commissioned by the State Secretariat for International Finance on the potential effects of this measure for banks such as UBS. The report indicates that among potential consequences to this increased requirement for capital is a temporary increase of borrowing costs. However, it also highlights how such a measure would increase the resilience of Swiss banks in the case of a crisis.

A preliminary version of the measures in the Too Big To Fail (TBTF) package were first set forward in April 2024. However, the Federal Council waited to announce a final version of the plan until June 2025, waiting for input from a report from the Parliamentary Investigation Committee. The measures in the TBTF plan are divided into three categories according to their role in ensuring banking stability. The first, "Strengthening prevention" involves measures such as legislation to prevent encouragement for risk-taking in senior banking executives in systemically important banks, such as with variable bonuses. This proposed legislation makes such bonuses subject to retention periods and even cancellation and repayment in the event of misconduct. This area of the package also provides for an increase in clear allocation of responsibility within senior management structures of all banks in order to increase accountability and prevent misconduct. The second, "Strengthening liquidity" includes measures such as requirements to prepare collateral to ensure liquidity of the central bank, with increased requirements for systemically important banks based on risk. The third and final area addressed in the Too Big To Fail package is "Expanding the crisis toolkit", with measures that include requirements for recovery planning on the part of the banks and revision of legislature to include criteria for such recovery plans, and similar such requirements and legislation for resolution planning. These measures affect both "going concern" issues, where the bank is still viable, and "gone concern" issues, when the bank is being liquidated and wound down. In all, there are 31 proposed measures, consisting of amendments to current legislation and ordinances alike. The TBTF package is expected to enter into force in stages, with amendments to existing ordinances already in consultation until September 2025. The first stage is expected to enter into force in 2027 at the earliest. The next stage, legislative amendments on foreign capital requirements, is to be drafted in late 2025, and is expected to enter into force in 2028. The last stage, consisting of the remaining legislative amendments, is to be drafted in early 2026. This last stage is expected to enter into force in 2028/2029.

=== Terrorism ===
Through the United States-Swiss Joint Economic Commission (JEC), Switzerland has passed strict legislation covering anti-terrorism financing and the prevention of terrorist acts, marked by the implementation of several anti-money laundering procedures and the seizure of al-Qaeda accounts.

=== European Union ===
Apart from agriculture, there are minimal economic and trade barriers between the European Union and Switzerland. In the wake of the Swiss voters' rejection of the European Economic Area Agreement in 1992, the Swiss Government set its sights on negotiating bilateral economic agreements with the EU. Four years of negotiations culminated in Bilaterals, a cross-platform agreement covering seven sectors: research, public procurement, technical barriers to trade, agriculture, civil aviation, land transport, and the free movement of persons. Parliament officially endorsed the Bilaterals in 1999 and it was approved by general referendum in May 2000. The agreements, which were then ratified by the European Parliament and the legislatures of its member states, entered into force on 1 June 2002. The Swiss government then embarked on a second round of negotiations, called the Bilaterals II, approved by the Swiss electorate on 5 June 2005, which further strengthens the country's economic ties with the organisation.

Switzerland has since brought most of their practices into conformity with European Union policies and norms in order to maximise the country's international competitiveness. While most of the EU policies are not contentious, police and judicial cooperation to international law enforcement and the taxation of savings are controversial, mainly because of possible side effects on bank secrecy.

Swiss and EU finance ministers agreed in June 2003 that Swiss banks would levy a withholding tax on EU citizens' savings income. The tax would increase gradually to 35% by 2011, with 75% of the funds being transferred to the EU. Recent estimates value EU capital inflows to Switzerland to $8.3 billion.

== Institutional membership ==
Switzerland is a member of a number of international economic organizations, including the United Nations, the World Trade Organization, the International Monetary Fund, the World Bank, and the Organisation for Economic Co-operation and Development.

== International comparison ==
Country	Distribution of employment by sector (%)			Unemployment rates (%)			Average hours worked per week
Country	Agricultural	Manufacturing	Services	Overall	Females	Males	Average hours worked per week
Switzerland (2006)	3.8	23	73.2	4.0	4.7	3.4	41.6
European Union-25 countries (2006)	4.7	27.4	67.9	8.2	9	7.6	40.5
Germany (2014)	2.1	24.4	73.5	5.2	4.9	5.5	41.2
France (2006)	3.9	24.3	71.8	8.8	9.5	8.1	39.1
Italy (2006)	4.2	29.8	66	6.6	8.5	5.2	39.3
United Kingdom (2006)	1.3	22	76.7	5.3	4.8	5.7	42.4
United States (2005)	1.6	20.6	77.8	5.1	5.6	5.9	41
Myanmar (2021–2022)	22.5	22.8	54.7	1.8	2.1	1.6%	49.0

== Regional disparities ==
Canton	Tax index for all federal, cantonal and church taxes 2006	Median church, local and cantonal tax rate (2011) by family status and pre-tax income				Pop. under 20 as % of pop. aged 20–64 (2007)	National income per person in CHF 2005	Change in national income per person 2003–2005
Canton	Tax index for all federal, cantonal and church taxes 2006	Unmarried		Married with 2 children		Pop. under 20 as % of pop. aged 20–64 (2007)	National income per person in CHF 2005	Change in national income per person 2003–2005
Canton	Tax index for all federal, cantonal and church taxes 2006	80,000 CHF	150,000 CHF	80,000 CHF	150,000 CHF	Pop. under 20 as % of pop. aged 20–64 (2007)	National income per person in CHF 2005	Change in national income per person 2003–2005
Switzerland	100	14.43	21.12	4.9	12.29	34.59	54,031	5.3
Zurich	82.9	11.01	17.31	4.50	10.52	31.12	68,803	4.6
Berne	123.1	14.75	21.96	6.79	14.23	33.05	45,643	5
Lucerne	119	13.49	18.04	5.07	11.18	37.19	43,910	5.3
Uri	144.2	11.95	15.76	5.91	10.84	37.06	45,711	5.3
Schwyz	66.5	8.53	13.04	3.33	7.77	36.95	50,170	6.3
Obwald	146.5	11.21	14.88	7.11	11.01	40.88	39,645	4.7
Nidwald	79.1	10.73	15.07	3.66	9.39	34.55	73,285	15.6
Glaris	134.8	11.99	17	5.51	11.22	36.85	73,236	10.9
Zoug	50.3	5.95	12.98	1.13	4.91	35.45	93,752	5.4
Friburg	126.4	15.18	21.88	5	12.89	40.2	39,559	2.6
Soleure	116.9	15.87	21.96	7.26	14.12	34.34	46,844	4.9
Basle-City	113.1	14.98	20.61	3.9	13.36	26.6	115,178	15.9
Basle-Country	92.5	14.52	22.07	3.37	12.64	33	53,501	3.9
Schaffhouse	114.6	13.68	20.1	5.63	11.44	32.92	55,125	5.4
Appenzell Outer-Rhodes	121.7	13.44	19.02	6.73	12.88	37.6	44,215	4.7
Appenzell Inner-Rhodes	105.6	11.68	16.68	5.13	10.79	44.46	45,936	7.4
St Gall	115.5	14.41	20.71	4.7	11.89	37.66	44,866	4
Grisons	112.2	13.79	20.16	3.97	11.37	33.97	49,355	11.7
Argovia	87.4	13.56	19.62	4.79	11.78	34.9	49,209	2.5
Thurgovia	86.6	13.58	18.89	4.38	11.52	37.52	44,918	3.2
Tessin	64.6	12.47	19.35	1.96	10.31	31.14	41,335	3.4
Vaud	106.2	15.44	21.77	5.09	13.14	37.87	52,901	3.4
Valais	121.3	14.71	22.94	4.29	10.41	35.18	38,385	6
Neuchâtel	137.1	18.44	25.5	8.5	16.94	38.06	49,775	6.6
Geneva	89.8	14.29	21.61	0.83	10.27	35.4	62,839	5.1
Jura	126.6	17.22	24.76	7.7	16.16	40.09	38,069	6.4

== See also ==
- Cantons of Switzerland see separate articles for cantonal economy
  - List of Swiss cantons by GDP
- Healthcare in Switzerland
- List of companies of Switzerland
  - List of Swiss companies by revenue
  - Pharmaceutical industry in Switzerland
  - Federation of the Swiss Watch Industry FH
- Science and technology in Switzerland
- Swiss labour law
- Taxation in Switzerland
- Transport in Switzerland
  - Rail transport in Switzerland
  - Merchant Marine of Switzerland
