= PAMP =

PAMP may refer to:

- Pathogen-associated molecular pattern, molecules associated with certain groups of pathogens
- PAMP (phenylanisylmethylphosphine) is a precursor to the chemical compound DIPAMP
- MKS PAMP, a Swiss company specializing in precious metals
- pamp, an abbreviation for pico amperes, pA; see Ampere
