= Technopark Zürich =

Science park in Zürich, Switzerland

Coordinates: 47.389974°N 8.515696°E

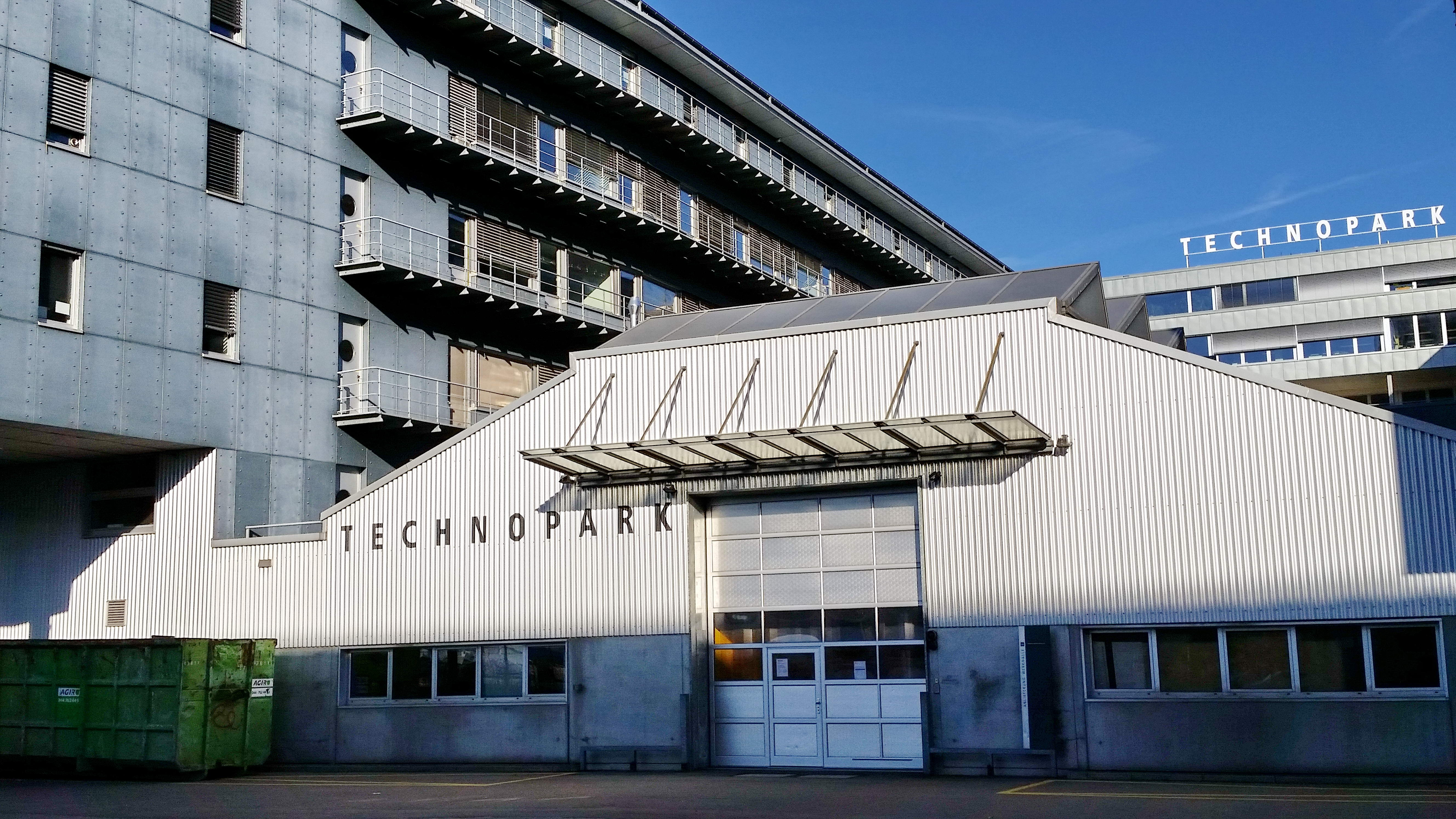
- Industry: Technology Business Park
- Genre: Infrastructure Service Provider
- Founded: 1993
- Headquarters: Foundation TECHNOPARK® Zürich Technoparkstrasse 1 8005 Zurich, Switzerland, Zürich, Canton of Zürich, Switzerland
- Number of locations: 1
- Area served: Switzerland
- Website: Official website

Technopark Zürich is a technopark research park based in the municipality of Zürich in the Canton of Zürich in Switzerland.

== History ==
Technopark Zürich was established in 1993. Its stated purpose was to provide rooms, offices and other spaces for people from various institutions such as universities, research institutes, start-ups and established enterprises.

== Organisation ==
Technopark Zürich is managed as a privately funded foundation. The foundation has two major divisions. One division is responsible for the real estate, handling all tenancy and facility management activities, including the lease of rooms for events. The other division is concerned with the affairs of the foundation - "to increase the competitiveness of the Swiss economy and to create enduring jobs".

== Collaborations ==
Technopark has numerous strategic collaborative partners to facilitate the transfer of knowledge and technology and the development of start-up companies: Centre Suisse d’Électronique et de Microtechnique (CSEM), CTI-Start-up, Division of Business and Economic Development of the Canton of Zürich, EMPA Dübendorf, ETH Zurich, FHS St.Gallen, glaTec, Greater Zurich Area, International Association of Science Parks (IASP), Swissparks, University of St. Gallen, University of Zurich, venturelab and Zurich University of Applied Sciences (ZHAW). Technopark-Alliance was founded in 2002 to provide technology from academia to practice. The Technoparks in Aargau, Lugano, Luzern, Schlieren, Winterthur, Liechtenstein (Vaduz), Landquart, and Zürich are members of the Technopark-Alliance.

== Location ==
Technopark is located in the Industriequartier district of the city of Zürich. It houses around 300 companies and organizations of the fields of science, technology, and economy, among them ETH Zürich, Swiss Post logistics and digitec, at its 47,000 m² site.

The Technopark building complex was built between 1989 and 1993. The project relied on the private design plan Techno Park (1991) and the private design plan Escher Wyss area (1995/99). In 2011 the city council of Zürich authorized the partial revision of the design plan, and in 2012 the middle section of the building was increased.
