= Reederei Zürich AG =

- Company type: Aktiengesellschaft
- Industry: Transport
- Founded: 1951
- Defunct: 1996
- Headquarters: Zürich, later Basel, Switzerland

Reederei Zürich AG was a Swiss company operating the maritime cargo ships Adele and Amelia, and a small fleet of Rhein river ships between 1952 and 1996. Not to be confused with the company of the same name that was established after the shipping company was deleted from the commercial registers.

== History ==
In Winter 1943 Gottlieb Duttweiler and the Migros-Genossenschafts-Bund, Zürich, withdrew from the shipping company Maritime Suisse S.A. Originally Duttweiler planned to establish the Merchant Marine of Switzerland during World War II, nevertheless, the creation a shipping company with initially three Victory and three Liberty ships, sailing on a regular liner service between the USA and the Mediterranean Sea, never was realized. The shipping company Reederei Zürich AG was founded on 26 July 1951 respectively on 3 August 1951, on initiative of Duttweiler respectively Migros-Genossenschafts-Bund (MGB), together with his business partner, Ernst Göhner, a construction entrepreneur from Zürich. The share capital amounted to 3,5 Mio. CHF, it was registered at Limmatstrasse 152, Zürich, at the same address as the MGB. Gottlieb Duttweiler was its president, Göhner the vice-president, Heinrich Rengel of the MGB-administration and Oskar Meier completed the board.

Now two fast freighters were ordered from the shipyard H. C. Stülcken, Hamburg: Adele, named after Duttweiler's wife Adele Duttweiler, and Amelia, named after Göhner's wife Amelia Göhner. Each unit was valued to 5,0 Mio. DM without the main engines which were ordered separately from Gebrüder Sulzer, Winterthur, for a total price of 3,75 Mio. CHF. The Swiss government financed 75% of the building costs under the terms, that during a crisis situation, the vessels would be immediately put at the government's disposal.

Some of the Swiss parliamentarians, but also Swiss news papers were disturbed about the English prefix SUN in the name of a Swiss ship, and other were indignant with the charterers. In February 1966 the time charter of SUNADELE with Saguenay was terminated and the ship resumed its original name ADELE until she was sold in November of the same year. Sunamelia remained in the Saguenay charter until 31 December 1968 and was then also renamed AMELIA sailing for more than one year until she was sold in February 1970. The company expected larger repairs during the coming class renewal, therefore it was decided to sell the two only maritime ships. The ocean going ships were not replaced anymore, therefore the era of ocean shipping ended.

In 1984 there were still 16 Rhein units with a carrying capacity of 26,000 tonnes, managed by the then Rheinreederei Zürich AG which may be established around April 1964. In 1984 the MGB obtained the share majority of the financially troubled Schweizerische Reederei & Neptun AG (SRN); on 1 March 1986 a common operating organisation for the two companies, Reederei Zürich AG and SRN was initiated to run the Rhein river ships of two fleets in common. Reederei Zürich AG was deleted on 30 September 1996 from the commercial registry, and on 21 February 2000 the SRN was sold.

== See also ==
- Adele (1952 ship)
- Merchant Marine of Switzerland
- Migros
