= Merchant Marine of Switzerland =

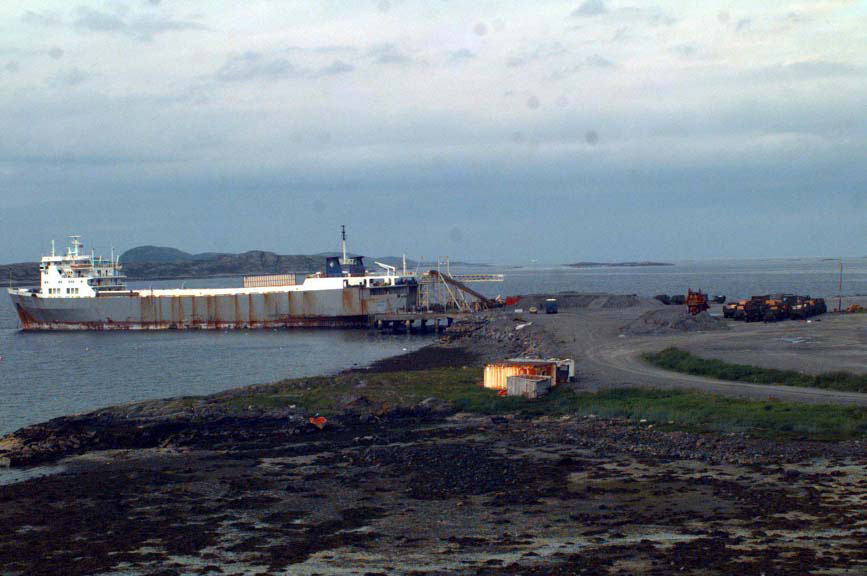
Swiss Ocean-worthy ferry Villars

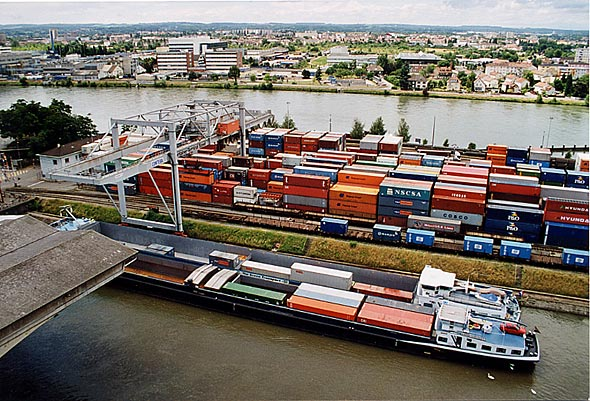
Basel docks

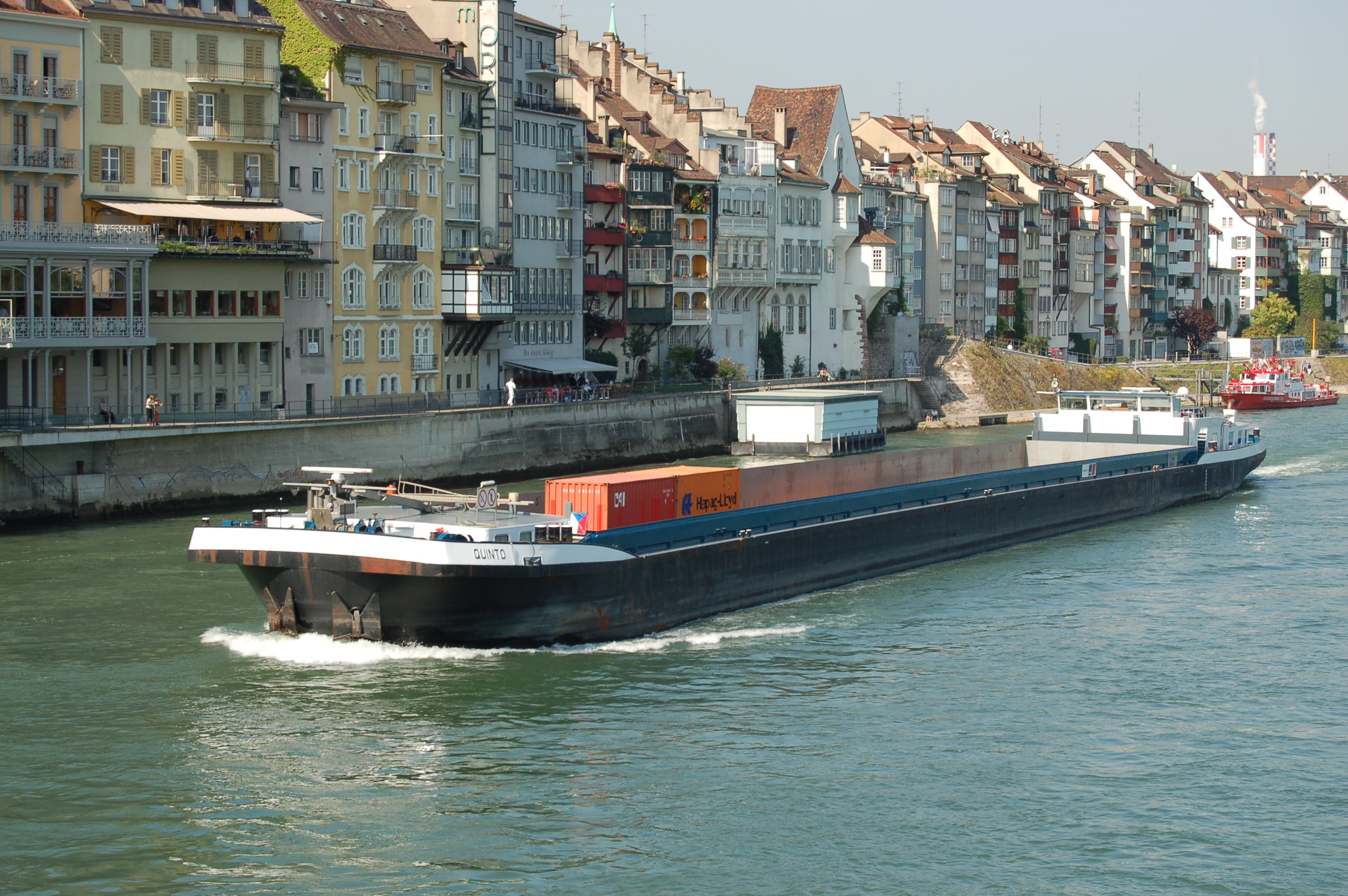
Rhine ship passing through Basel

The Merchant Marine of Switzerland is the largest merchant navy of a landlocked country. Somewhat unusual for a landlocked country, Switzerland has a long tradition of civilian navigation, both on its lakes and rivers, and on the high seas.

== History ==
The Swiss merchant navy was founded in 1941, with the purpose of supplying Switzerland with basic goods during the Second World War. As of 2016, its essential mission remains supplying the country with goods in times of crisis.

== Swiss inland navigation ==
The Rhine port of Basel connects Switzerland to the Port of Rotterdam and thus to the sea trade network. Swiss industry and commerce rely on this connection, exploited for centuries by Swiss Rhine barges, for a substantial part of their imports and exports.

Swiss lakes, most notably Lake Constance, Lake Maggiore and Lake Geneva (CGN), are among the most intensively navigated lakes in the world, mostly for recreational and tourist purposes. Also other lakes such as Lake Lucerne (SGV), Lake Lugano (SNL), Lake Walen (Schiffsbetrieb Walensee) and Lake Zurich (ZSG), and sections of the Aare and High Rhine (URh) rivers are navigated by recreational boat lines. There are additional car ferries, such as between Beckenried and Gersau and between Horgen and Meilen .

== Swiss high seas fleet ==
Switzerland has a civilian high seas fleet of merchant vessels, whose home port is Basel, in Switzerland.

The first ships were purchased and operated by the government in order to ensure the supply of critical resources during World War II. After the war, a privately owned merchant fleet emerged, spurred in part by government subsidies that paid for the fleet's operation up until 1953, among them on behalf of the Migros Genossenschaftsbund the cargo ship Adele which was christened by Adele Duttweiler, the wife of Gottlieb Duttweiler, in Hamburg on 15 July 1952; her sister ship Sunamelia was commissioned some months later.

In 2010, a fleet of 37 ships flew the Swiss flag, which was made up of bulk carriers, container ships, multi-purpose freighters and tankers, totalling one million tonnes and operated by six shipping companies. By 2022, the fleet had declined to 14 ships, down from 49 in 2016.

== Shipping companies ==
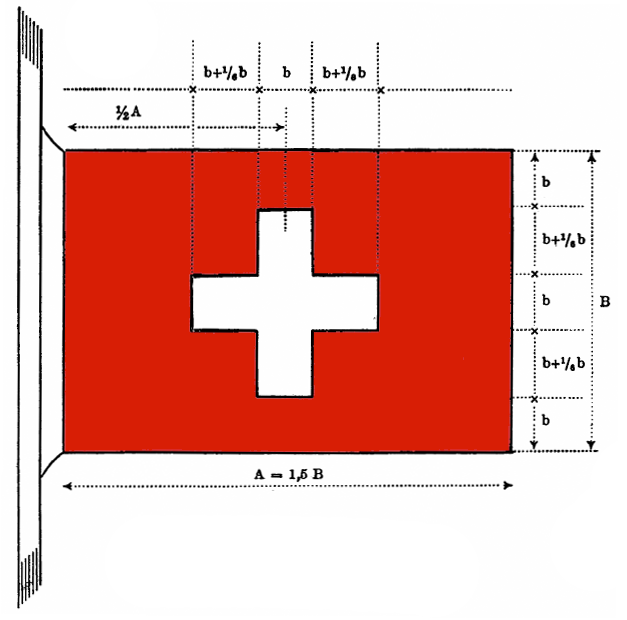
The flag of Switzerland at sea.

- ABC Maritime AG
- Enzian Shipping AG
- Massoel Gestion SA
- Mega Chemicals Schiffahrt AG
- Reederei Zürich AG
- Suisse-Atlantique Société de Navigation Maritime SA
- Mediterranean Shipping Company
