= Adele (1952 ship) =

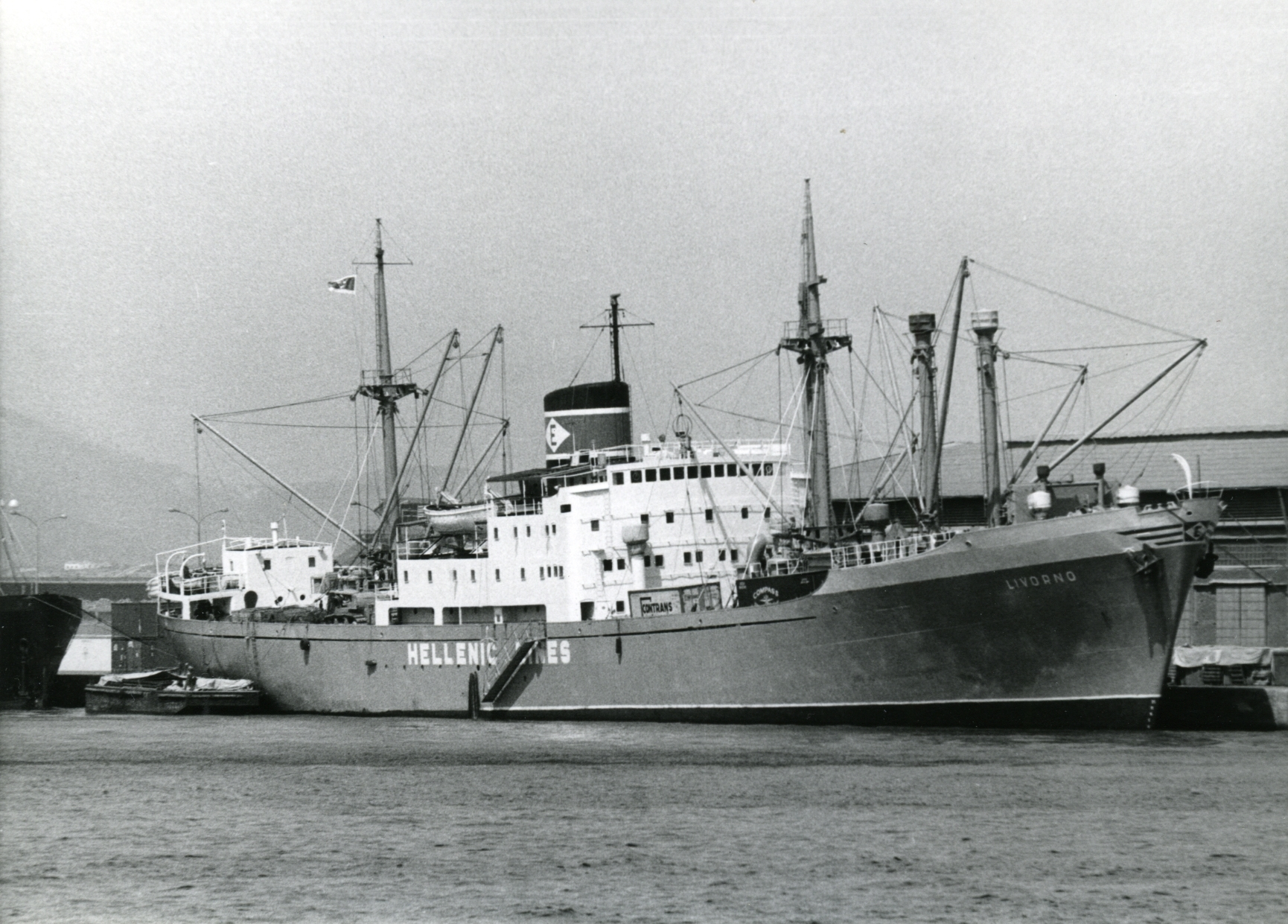
- Livorno (1971)

History

Switzerland
- Name: Adele respectively Sunadele
- Owner: Migros MGB (1952–1966); Transpacific Carriers Corp. (1966–1980)
- Operator: Saguenay Terminals Incorp. (1952–1966); Hellenic Lines Ltd (1977–1980)
- Port of registry: (Switzerland) Basel
- Ordered: Reederei Zürich AG
- Builder: H. C. Stülcken Sohn, Hamburg, Germany
- Cost: 6,500,000 CHF
- Yard number: 808
- Laid down: November 1951
- Launched: 15 July 1952
- Christened: Adele Duttweiler
- In service: 11 September 1952
- Out of service: 8 August 1980
- Renamed: Livorno (1966)
- Identification: Swiss Official Number 047; 1952–1966: Code Letters HBNL; 1966–1980: Code Letters SZQD
- Fate: Scrapped

General characteristics
- Type: Cargo ship
- Tonnage: 4,995 GRT; 2,651 NRT; 6,290 DWT
- Length: 117.53 m (385.60 ft)
- Beam: 16.8 m (55.12 ft)
- Draught: 8.1 m (26.57 ft)
- Installed power: 5,600 hp (4,200 kW)
- Propulsion: Sulzer 8SD72-CRDA eight-cylinder two-stroke diesel engine
- Speed: 16.5 knots (30.6 km/h) normal, 17.75 knots (32.87 km/h) knots maximal
- Capacity: 12 passengers
- Crew: 38

Adele was a Swiss cargo ship, later the merchant ship Sunadele. Initiated by Gottlieb Duttweiler and named after Adele Duttweiler, she served in the Merchant Marine of Switzerland.

== Reederei Zürich AG ==
In Winter 1943 Gottlieb Duttweiler and the Migros-Genossenschafts-Bund, Zürich, withdrew from the shipping company Maritime Suisse S.A. originally planned to establish the Merchant Marine of Switzerland during World War II. Nevertheless, the creation of a shipping company with initially three Victory and three Liberty ships, sailing on a regular liner service between the US and the Mediterranean Sea, never was realized. The shipping company Reederei Zürich AG was founded on 26 July 1951, and immediately two fast freighters were ordered from the shipyard H. C. Stülcken, Hamburg: Adele, named after Duttweiler's wife Adele Duttweiler, and Amelia, named after Göner's wife Amelia Göhner. Each unit was valued to 5,0 Mio. DM without the main engines which were ordered separately from Gebrüder Sulzer, Winterthur, for a total price of 3,75 Mio. CHF. The Swiss government financed 75% of the building costs under the terms, that during a crisis situation, the vessels would be immediately put at the government's disposal. Some of the Swiss parliamentarians, but also Swiss news papers were disturbed about the English prefix SUN in the name of a Swiss ship, and other were indignant with the charterers. In February 1966 the time charter of SUNADELE with Saguenay was terminated and later sold; SUNAMELIA remained in the Saguenay charter until 31 December 1968 until she was sold in February 1970.

== Career ==
=== Construction ===
The Zürich-based Swiss Reederei Zürich AG ordered at the H. C. Stülcken Sohn shipyard in Hamburg, Germany, a cargo ship which was built under hull Number 808, being so far the biggest vessel Stülcken shipyard had built after the World War II. The building supervision and the technical management was allocated to C. Clausen, Copenhagen, Denmark. Launched in Hamburg on 15 July 1952, the ship was christened "ADELE" by Adele Duttweiler, the wife of Gottlieb Duttweiler who was the founder and president of the shipping company that was provided by the Swiss retailer Migros. Adele was delivered to the owners on 11 September 1952, and she was registered as official Number 047, call sign HBFL, under Swiss flag with the charter name "SUNADELE".

=== Charter ===
Adele commenced a time charter with Montreal-based Saguenay Terminals Incorporated right after delivery from the shipyard. Therefore, the ship had to adopt the charter name "SUNADELE", as all Saguenay vessels were named with the prefix "SUN". Sunadele's first voyage went from Hamburg, via Rotterdam and London to Venezuela. The first six-year time charter was extended several times. On completion of the charter on 4 February 1966, the vessel resumed its name Adele until she was sold to Transpacific Carriers Corpopration Piraeus respectively Hellenic Lines Ltd at a reported price of US$630,000 on 26 November 1966. The vessel was renamed Livorno and was registered under Greek flag (call sign SZQD). In 1977 she was transferred to Hellenic Lines Ltd in Piraeus, and sailed under Greek flag on different regular lines. In 1980 the vessel was sold for demolition to Mao Chen Iron & Steel Co. Ltd., Kaohsiung, Taiwan: on 25 June 1980 Livorno passed the Panama Canal on her last voyage to Kaohsiung, where she arrived on 8 August 1980.

=== Trading routes during Saguenay charter ===
SUNADELE and her sister vessel SUNAMELIA sailed usually in a triangular trade in the Atlantic, between Northern Europe, United Kingdom, Caribbean Sea, Central America and Canada/USA. From Europe and from Canada general cargo was carried to the West Indies and to Central America, from Canada to Europe the vessels were mainly carrying paper and aluminium products. From the mines of Mackenzie, on Demerara River in Guyana, the tween deck cargo vessels mainly carried bauxite to the aluminium plant in Port Alfred, Canada. Sometimes also a full cargo of sugar from Cuba or from Guyana was carried up to Northern America. On a normal voyage usually three to five ports were visited, especially in the West Indies, among others, Georgetown, Mackenzie in Guyana, Port of Spain on Trinidad, ports in Venezuela, Colombia, Costa Rica, Guatemala, the ports of Cuba and Haiti and Jamaica, Santo Domingo, Dominican Republic, Puerto Rico, and the islands of Barbados, Domenica, Grenada and St. Vincent. However the voyages did change, depending on cargo availability and other operational requirements. In North America, the main ports were Montreal, Port Alfred up the Saguenay River in Quebec, Halifax, Saint John (New Brunswick) and New York. In summer time the ships went to the ports in the St. Lawrence River, but in winter time Sunadele/Sunamelia were diverted to the ice-free ports of Halifax and Saint John. In Europe usually the ships called at Antwerp, Hamburg, Rotterdam, and in the U.K. at Avonmouth, Cardiff, Liverpool, London and Glasgow.

== Crew ==
For her maiden tour, the captain, officers and crew first were hired from Denmark, only three seamen from Switzerland were on board. The working contracts were according to Danish regulations, and the wage was paid in Danish Kroner. In 1955 the Reederei Zürich AG took over full control and management of the vessel, and the crew was paid according to Swiss regulations, and about 75% were Swiss at the end of 1956. Later almost all crew members were from Switzerland, except for the captain and the deck officers, who remained mostly German and Dutch nationals. Even their relatives received Christmas letters by the owner.

== Technical specifications ==
=== Cargo equipment ===
The vessel had an increased baking and a midship deckhouse with underlying engine room. The longitudinal-framed hull was ice-reinforced. Built as a closed shelter-decker, Adele had a grain capacity of 9,174 cubic metres (323,977 ft^{3}) and an internal volume of 8,711 cubic metres (307,626 ft^{3}) ball steerage. Two of the four cargo holds were arranged in front of the bridge structure, two were behind it. The two front rooms were accessible by three hatches, the aft rooms had one hatch each. The cargo consisted of 12 normal light derricks on all hatches and a 25-ton heavy lift on hold 2. The 12 AEG-type winches, manufactured under license by Kampnagel Schaerffe, Hamburg, were designed to lift 3 tons at 30 feet (9.1 m)/min in single gear, or 5 tons at that speed in double gear. Each was driven by an 18.4-kW electric motor. The derricks between the two forward hatches were attached to double post, which served simultaneously as a cargo space ventilation of 20 changes of air per hour, the second front and aft cargo gear was on conventional central derricks. The hatches were fitted with a sliding steel hatch cover, and the main deck was lined with 63 millimetres (2.5 in) thick Oregon pine to prevent heat radiation, assumably to carry fruits. However, no refrigeration plant was fitted, hence the carriage of any fruit had been restricted to short sea trade, such as from Spain or Canary Islands to North Europe. Besides the shaft tunnel there were cargo tanks.

=== Machinery ===
The particularly elaborate arrangement for the purifying and heating of the heavy oil used in the main engine was a feature of the machinery installation. The ship was powered by an eight-cylinder two-stroke diesel engine of the type Sulzer 8SD72-CRDA, which was built under license by Cantieri Riuniti dell'Adriatico in Trieste. Each cylinder had a bore of 720 millimetres (28.3 in) and a stroke of 1,250 millimetres (49.2 in). The engine's normal service rating was 5,600 hp at 125 rpm, driving a Karl Zeise right-hand four-bladed propeller of 4.8 metres (15.7 ft) im diameter. The main engine was generally of standard Sulzer design of the crosshead type, with an independent scavenge pump to each cylinder. It was arranged for operation on heavy oil. The only departure from standard was that the fuel valves had special provisions to enable the fuel to be circulated. The pistons were oil-cooled and the jackets fresh water-cooled. On the starboard side of the engine-room were three AEG 160 kW 120-volt generators, each driven by a Sulzer four-stroke Diesel engine. The emergency set comprised a Motorenwerke Mannheim AG generator driving a two-cylinder 31 hp engine which drives a 20 kW AEG generator, also a two-stage compressor capable of delivering 26 CU.m. of free air per hour. The fuel consumption of the vessel, when running at full speed and on heavy oil, was 24 tons a day, while the Diesel-oil consumption of the three generators was approximately three tons per day. Adele and her sister ship Amelia had for cargo ships of that time a powerful drive: normally they ran with 16.25 knots (30.10 km/h), but their top speed was 17.75 knots (32.87 km/h).

=== Crew and passenger compartments ===
The local newspapers in Hamburg were full of praise for the modern crew accommodations: The crew of 38 had all a single cabin, except a few mess-boys who were in double berth cabins below the main deck. However, no air condition was fitted in the entire passenger and crew accommodations, but individual electric fans only, in addition to the central ventilation system. The upper deck was reserved for 12 passengers, accommodated in 10 single and in one double cabin, all with their own bathrooms. The charterers requested from the owners, that two stewardesses are employed on each ship to look after the well-being of the passengers. The forward front of the superstructure housed the dining room, smoking saloon and the bar, where the captain, chief engineer and first officer were dining with the passengers. The public rooms and the cabins were tastefully furnished with plenty of wood. The boat deck was strictly reserved for the master, the deck officers and the radio operator. The single cabins for the deck crew and the motormen were on the poop deck on two levels. These cabins had a washbasin, but toilettes and showers were for common use. In the deckhouse on the top was the crew bar. The mess rooms with a small pantry for the deck crew and the motormen were located in the aft mast house. Mid ships on the main deck were the engineer's and the chief engineer's cabins, the cabins of the chief steward and the cooks, the galley and the officer's mess. Even the engineers, except for the chief, had a communal shower and toilette.

== See also ==
- Adele Duttweiler
- Reederei Zürich AG

== Literature ==
- Kurt Schmid: Steuerbord zehn: Erlebnisse eines jungen Schweizers in den frühen sechziger Jahren auf hoher See. Books on Demand, 2014. ISBN 978-3-73570-314-9.
- Margrit und Ernst Baumann: Die Welt sehen: Fotoreportagen 1945-2000. Scheidegger & Spiess, Zürich 2010. ISBN 978-3-85881-302-2.
