= Marcel Dobler =

Swiss businessman and politician

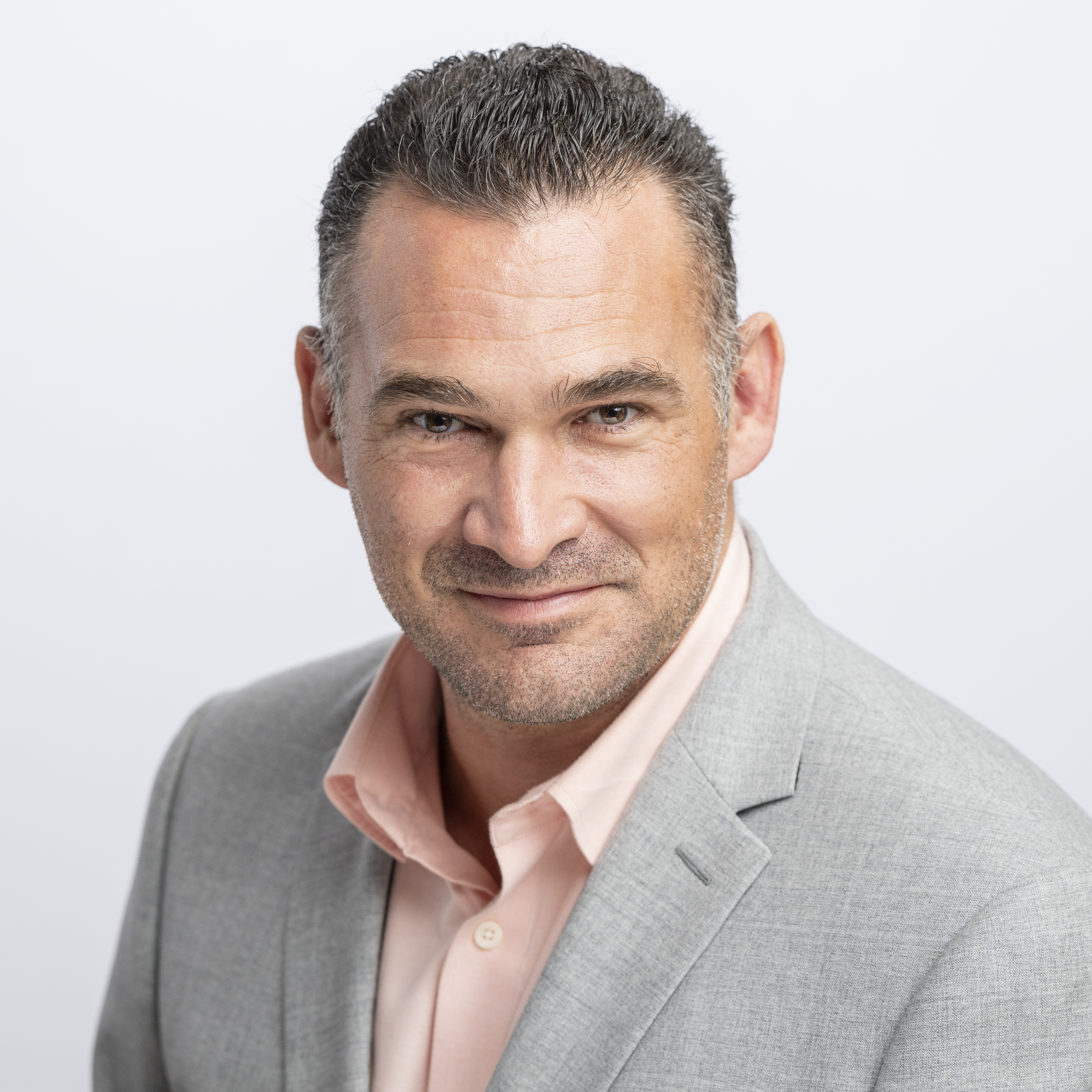
- Dobler in 2023

Member of the National Council (Switzerland)
- Incumbent
- Assumed office 30 November 2015
- Constituency: Canton of St. Gallen

Personal details
- Born: Marcel René Dobler; 29 August 1980 (age 46) Männedorf, Zürich, Switzerland
- Party: The Liberals
- Education: University of Applied Sciences Rapperswil (BS)
- Occupation: Businessman, politician
- Website: marcel-dobler.ch (in German)

Military service
- Branch/service: Swiss Armed Forces
- Rank: Soldier

Marcel René Dobler (/dɒblɛr/, DOUHBLER; born 29 August 1980) is a Swiss businessman and politician. He currently serves as member of the National Council (Switzerland) for The Liberals since 30 November 2015. Dobler is primarily known for founding Digitec Galaxus, Switzerland's largest online retailer. In 2018, Dobler acquired Franz Carl Weber, a retailer for children's toys. Dobler is among the richest Swiss politicians in the legislative estimated by Handelszeitung.

== Early life and education ==
Dobler was born 29 August 1980 in Männedorf, Switzerland. He initially completed an apprenticeship as Electronics technician and in parallel he completed his Professional Maturity. Between 2001 and 2003 he studied Information technology at the University of Applied Sciences Rapperswil, leaving without degree. He completed his Bachelor of Science between 2014 and 2015.

== Career ==
In 2001, Dobler co-founded Digitec Galaxus, and led the company which had an annual turnover of 500 million Swiss Francs (2013) and 450 employees (sales 2014). Since 2017, he is the president of ICTswitzerland, between 2017 and 2018 a board member of SwissSign and since 2018 controlling shareholder and chairman of Franz Carl Weber. Digitec Galaxus was later integrated into Migros. Dobler currently also serves as a board director of Economiesuisse.

== Politics ==
Dobler was elected into National Council (Switzerland) in the 2015 Swiss federal election for the Canton of St. Gallen constituency. He is a member on the commission for social security and health and the legislative planning commission 2019–2023. At the 2019 Swiss federal election, Dobler was nominated for National Council (Switzerland) and Council of States (Switzerland), he was reelected into National Council.

== Personal life ==
He is married to Simone Dobler, an attorney, and they have two children. They reside in Rapperswil-Jona on Lake Zurich.
