= Digitec Galaxus =

Swiss online retailer

Digitec Galaxus AG
- Industry: Retail
- Founded: 8 May 2001
- Headquarters: Technopark Zürich, Zürich, Switzerland
- Number of locations: 10
- Area served: Switzerland (2001), Germany (2018), Austria (2021), France, Italy, Belgium, Netherlands (2023)
- Key people: Florian Teuteberg (CEO, President of the board of directors) Oliver Herren (CIO, board of directors) Martin Walthert (CMO) Thomas Fugmann (CFO) Michael Stolle (COO) Hendrik Blenken Blijdenstein (CPO) Stefan Mueller (CTO) Rebekka Fricke (CPCO)
- Services: 10 stores, telephone orders and online distribution
- Revenue: CHF 2.7 billion (2023)
- Number of employees: 2350 (December 2020)
- Parent: Migros
- Website: Official website Official website Official website

Digitec Galaxus AG is the biggest online retailer in Switzerland. The company is 70% owned by Migros and operates the Digitec and Galaxus online stores in Switzerland and neighboring EU countries. Galaxus is an online department store with a wide range of products, while Digitec specializes in IT and electronics. The company generated sales of 2.7 billion Swiss francs in 2023.

== History ==
Digitec was launched in April 2001 by the three young entrepreneurs Oliver Nägeli (now Oliver Herren), Florian Teuteberg and Marcel Dobler under the name Nägeli Trading & Co.

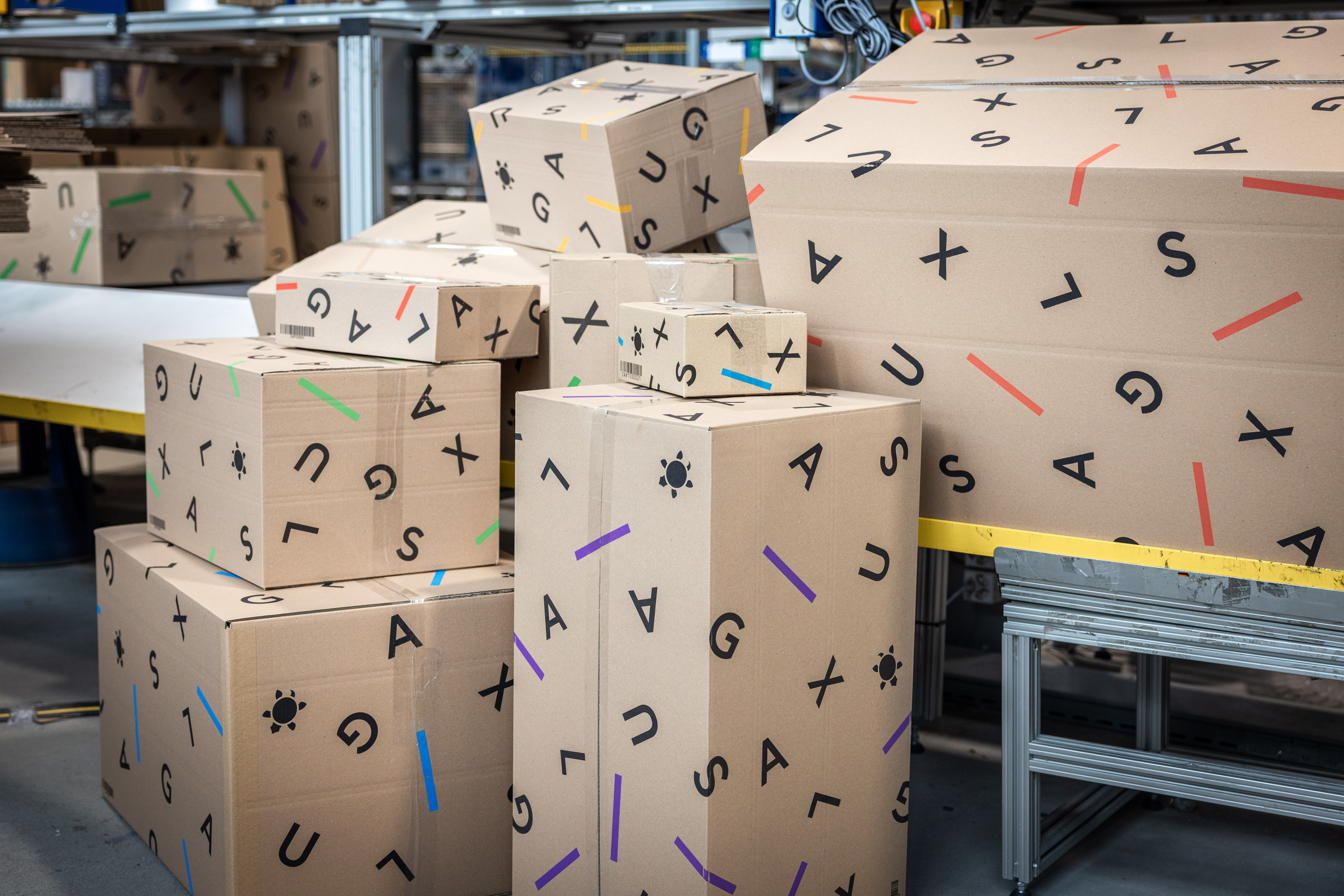
Galaxus shipping boxes

On 13 June 2005, they converted the company into an Aktiengesellschaft (corporation). The business then traded under the name Digitec AG until 2014.

Fast-forward to May 2012 and Digitec AG was taking its Galaxus e-commerce site online to expand its product range beyond consumer electronics. Extending their product line to include day-to-day items was the company's response to shrinking margins and meagre growth in the electronics trade.

In June 2012, Migros acquired a 30% share in Digitec for an estimated 42 million Swiss francs. And since 2015, Migros has been a majority shareholder in Galaxus AG with a stake of 70%.

On 2 September 2014, Digitec AG changed its name to Galaxus (Schweiz) AG. And on 28 July 2015, Digitec Galaxus AG was born, thereby making a clear link between the two brands digitec and Galaxus.

In April 2017, Digitec Galaxus AG started focusing on gamification, making it the first Swiss online retailer to do so.

As of August 2017, Digitec Galaxus AG extended the time customers have to return products from 14 to 30 days.

Meanwhile, September 2017 saw Digitec Galaxus AG decide to expand its warehouse.

October 2017 marked a milestone for the company when it was announced Galaxus would be expanding to Germany in 2018. The exact launch date has not yet been confirmed. This move ensures the company has access to the Digital Single Market. If Digitec Galaxus AG has success in Germany, it intends to expand to other countries.

In November 2017, the company launched a recommerce feature. This allows customers to resell products purchased from Digitec Galaxus products through Digitec Galaxus.

In November 2018, Galaxus announced the launch of its German online shop galaxus.de.

Digitec Galaxus offers a filter for sustainable products since 2020.

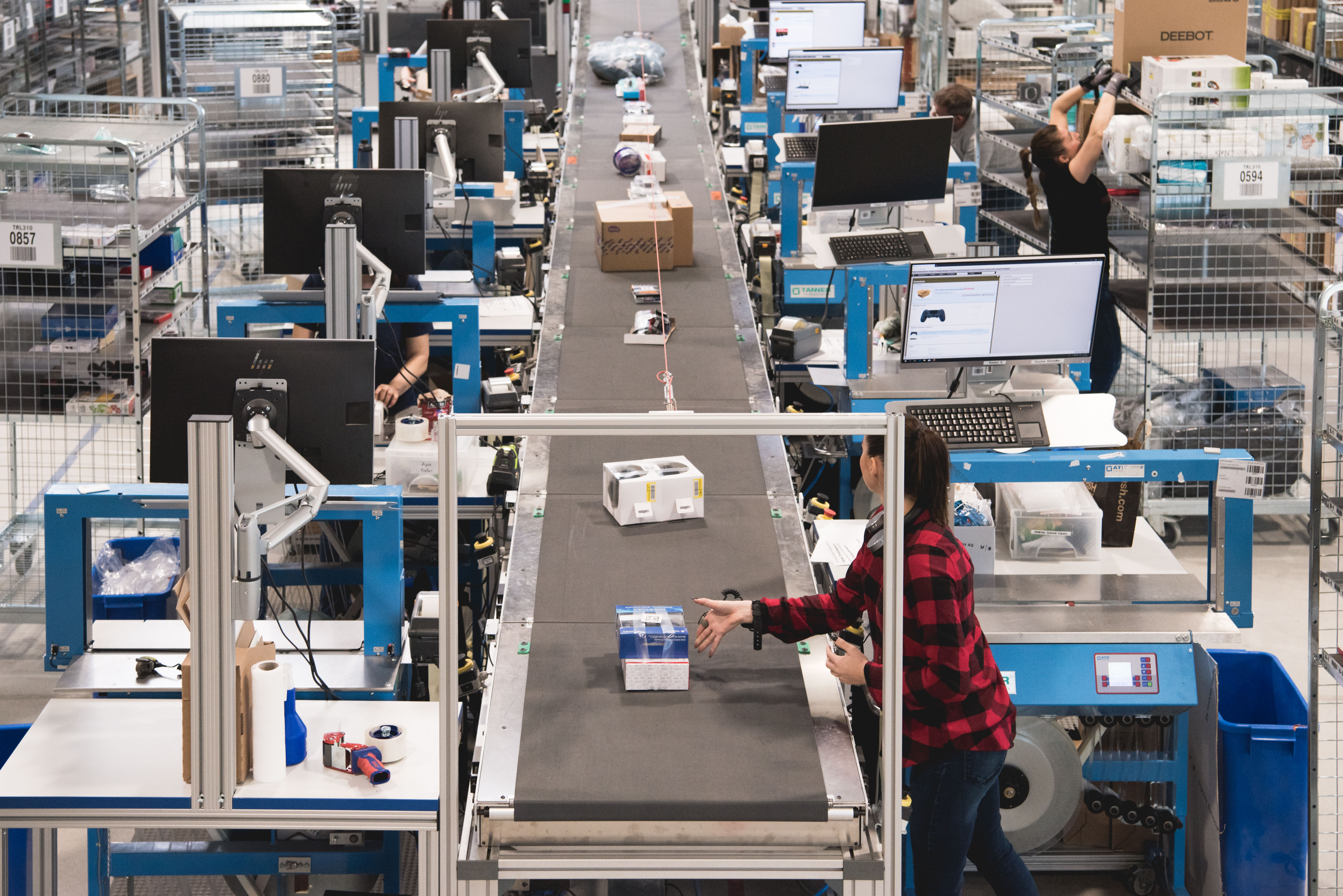
Digitec Galaxus warehouse in Wohlen, Aargau, Switzerland

In November 2021, Galaxus expanded to Austria with galaxus.at.

In 2022, a new warehouse with almost four times the storage area is to be opened at the logistics site in Krefeld.

In 2023, the company entered the French, Italian, Belgian and Dutch markets.

Since 2023, Digitec Galaxus has displayed the warranty and returns rate for all products in its range.

In 2023, more than four million customers shopped at Digitec Galaxus, three million of them in Switzerland and one million in the EU.

Since 2024, Galaxus and Digitec have indicated the radiation exposure of all smartphones.

== Revenue ==
Tabular development of revenue in millions of Swiss francs.

Year	2001	02	03	04	05	06	07	08	09	10	11	12	13	14	15	16	17	18	19	20	21	22	23
Revenue	4	9	18	32	37	62	140	225	316	359	429	509	551	601	694	726	866	992	1146	1826	2122	2427	2744

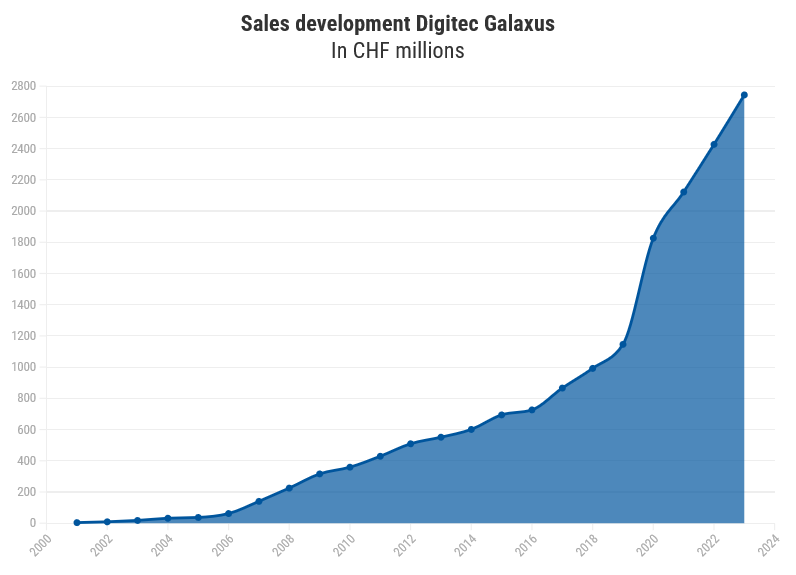
Sales development Digitec Galaxus

Galaxus generated sales of 286 million euros in the EU in 2023.

== Product range ==
The online department store Galaxus offers the full product range of Digitec Galaxus AG, while Digitec specializes in electronics.

At the end of 2023, the Swiss product range of Digitec and Galaxus included around 6.3 million products. As part of a marketplace model, external retailers have also been offering their products via Galaxus in Switzerland since 2016 and in Germany since 2023, and re-commerce is also offered.

Digitec Galaxus offers a cell phone subscription for customers in Switzerland under the name Galaxus Mobile.

== Stores and collection options ==
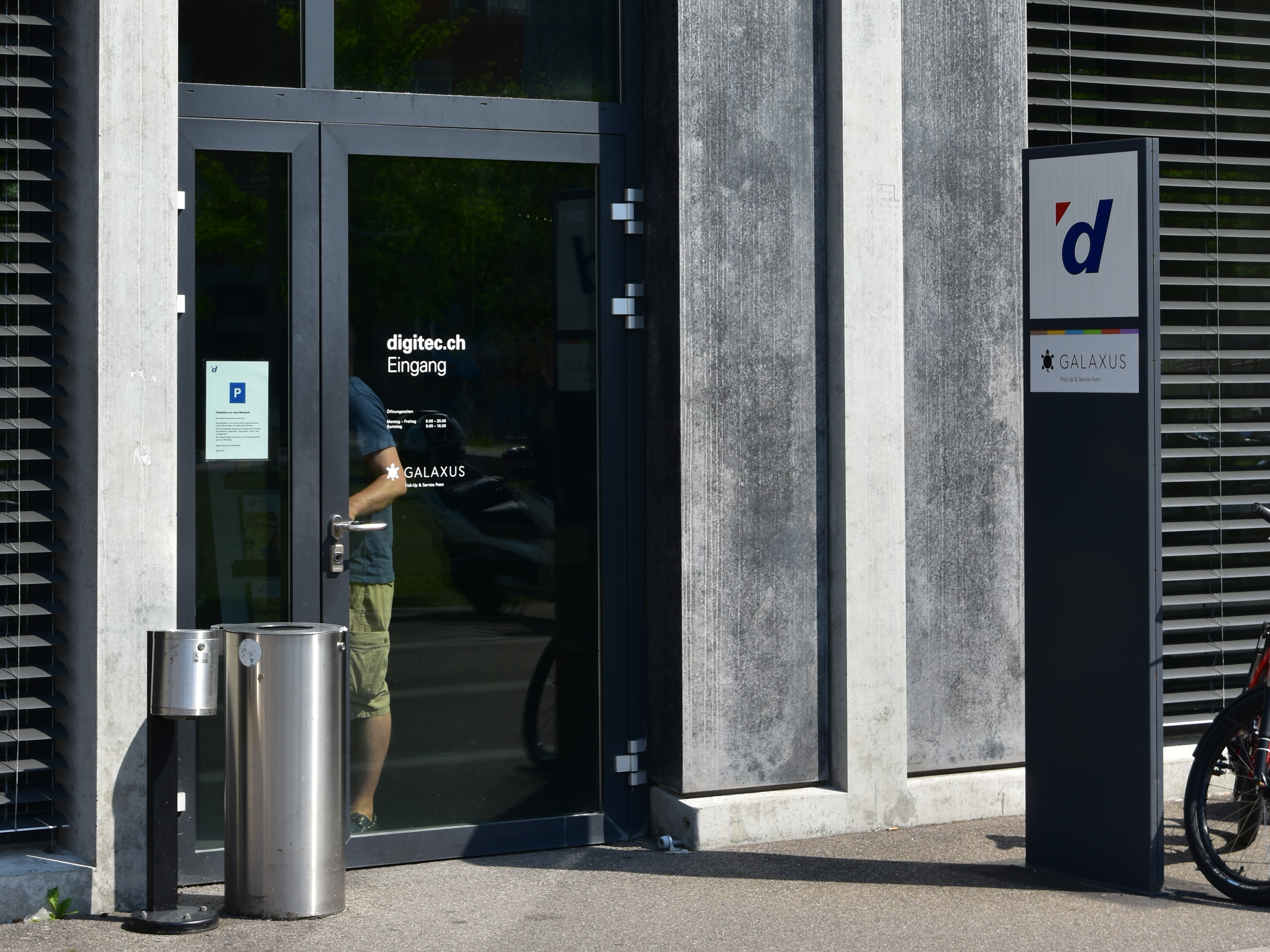
Digitec shop Technopark Zürich

Digitec Galaxus AG has ten stores in German and French speaking parts of Switzerland. These stores act as showrooms, collection and return points for products as well as places to purchase and ask questions about them. Therefore, the company is not purely an online retailer. Digitec Galaxus AG follows an approach that is known as a multichannel or omnichannel strategy in the industry.

The company has stores in Basel, Bern, Dietikon, Geneva, Kriens, Lausanne, St. Gallen, Winterthur, Wohlen (AG) and Zurich.

== Logistics ==
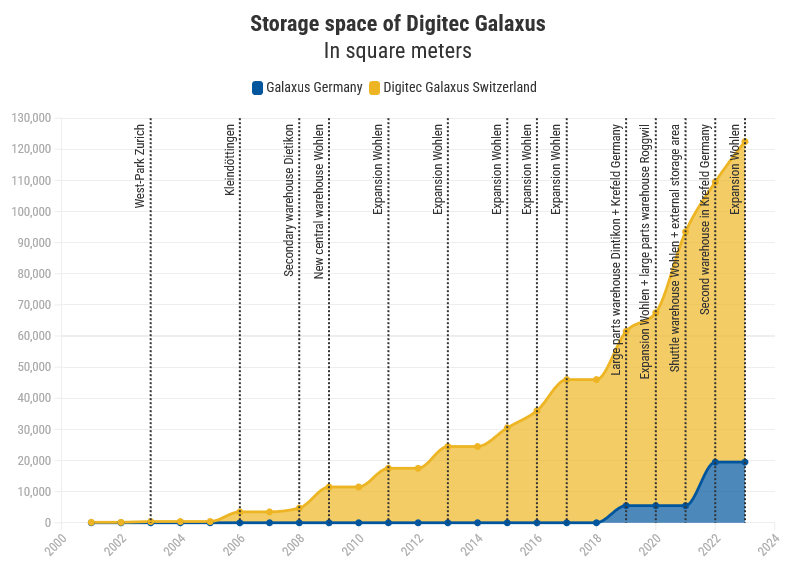
Storage space of Digitec Galaxus

From 2006 to 2009, Digitec Galaxus operated a warehouse in Kleindöttingen in the canton of Aargau, and since 2009 Digitec Galaxus has operated a warehouse in Wohlen on the site of the former Ferrowohlen steelworks. A new, fully automated small parts warehouse went into operation there in 2020 and was expanded in 2023. An EU hub in Weil am Rhein was put into operation at the end of April 2018. Foreign consignments are collected and cleared through customs there fully automatically before being handed over to Swiss Post for delivery. In 2019, a warehouse for large products was put into operation in Dintikon.

Galaxus has been operating a warehouse in Krefeld, Germany, since 2018. In 2023, the online retailer moved into a new warehouse at the same location with almost four times the storage space. The EU countries are supplied from Krefeld. In 2022, Galaxus employed around 100 people there.

Digitec Galaxus plans to build a new distribution center on the former site of the Utzenstorf paper mill, and is planning another warehouse in Rafz. At the beginning of 2024, Digitec Galaxus announced that it would be opening a warehouse in Neuenburg am Rhein in southern Germany. The warehouse area is around 90,000 m². Commissioning will take place in stages between 2025 and 2028.

== Delivery ==
For shipping, Digitec Galaxus works with Swiss Post, among others, and products are delivered to Switzerland and Liechtenstein. The second shipping partner in Switzerland is Planzer. In the first quarter of 2024, the option was created to give preference to either Planzer or Swiss Post as a supplier. The products in stock in the warehouse are shipped on the same day from Monday to Friday and generally arrive at the delivery address the next working day. The availability of each product can be viewed in real time.[38] Same-day delivery was introduced in the city of Zurich in 2020. Same-day delivery was expanded to 60% of Swiss households by 2023.

In the EU, DHL is Digitec Galaxus' shipping partner.

Digitec Galaxus has been offering its customers “slow delivery” since August 2022.

== Awards ==
- Digital Commerce Champion 2018
- Swiss Poster Award 2017 in the category "Commercial National"
- Digital Marketer of the Year 2018
- Swiss Marketing Society (GfM) marketing prize 2017
- Swiss E-Commerce Award 2017
  - Galaxus: Swiss E-Commerce Champion 2017
  - Galaxus: Winner of the B2C - Home & Living category
  - Galaxus: Winner of the Curation, Social and Content Commerce category
- Best of Swiss Web Award 2015: Swiss Web Award
- Third place in the SVC enterprise award 2011 for Zurich
- Swiss Economic Award 2008
