= MKS PAMP =

Precious minerals trader

- Type: Privately held
- Industry: Precious metals
- Founded: 1979; merged with PAMP SA in 2021
- Founder: Mahmoud Kassem Shakarchi
- Headquarters: Geneva, Switzerland
- Key people: Marwan Shakarchi (Executive Board Member) James Emmett (CEO)
- Products: Refined precious metals
- Parent: MKS PAMP GROUP
- Website: mkspamp.com

MKS PAMP (an abbreviation of Mahmoud Kassem Shakarchi Produits Artistiques Metaux Precieux), also known as MKS PAMP SA, is a Swiss company that trades, refines, and fabricates precious metals, including, gold, silver, platinum group metals. It is headquartered in Geneva, operates a refinery and mint in Castel San Pietro, Ticino, and trading offcices in Geneva, New York, and Hong Kong.

MKS PAMP is part of MKS PAMP GROUP, whose activities span, refining, minting, trading, distribution and retail of precious metals. The group operates two refineries, three mints and eight e-commerce platforms, and employs more than 1,650 people. Its entities include MKS PAMP, MMTC-PAMP, Gold token and Bullion International Group, which comprises MTB, APMEX, SOLIT Group and Gold Avenue.

== History ==
=== Founding and early development ===
MKS PAMP traces its origins to two companies: PAMP SA (Produits Artistiques Métaux Précieux), a precious-metals refining and minting business founded in Castel San Pietro, Ticino, Switzerland, in 1977; and MKS (Switzerland) SA, a Geneva-based precious-metals trading company founded in 1979 by Mahmoud Kassem Shakarchi.

In 1981, MKS acquired a majority stake in PAMP, extending the company's activities from precious-metals trading into refining and minting.

Following Mahmoud Shakarchi's death in 1983, his children Karma and Marwan Shakarchi assumed leadership of the company.

=== International expansion and accreditations ===
Over the following decades, the company expanded its international presence, establishing offices in financial and precious-metals trading centres including Hong Kong and New York.

In 2003, PAMP was appointed an Approved Referee for the London Good Delivery system by the London Bullion Market Association (LBMA).

=== Formation of MKS PAMP SA ===
In 2021, MKS (Switzerland) SA and PAMP SA merged to form MKS PAMP SA, combining the company's trading, refining, fabrication and minting activities within a single corporate structure.

In November 2025, MKS PAMP acquired full ownership of Gold Token S.A. as part of its activities involving tokenised precious-metals products.

== Operations ==
MKS PAMP is headquartered in Geneva, Switzerland, where its trading and treasury services are based. Its refining and minting operations are located in Castel San Pietro in the Swiss canton of Ticino.

The company operates across precious-metals refining, minting, trading, vaulting and storage, serving financial institutions and other participants in the precious-metals industry. It produces cast and minted bars in gold, silver, platinum and palladium.

MKS PAMP is listed on the London Bullion Market Association (LBMA) and London Platinum and Palladium Market (LPPM) Good Delivery Lists. It is also one of a small number of refineries worldwide designated as a Good Delivery Referee by both organisations.

== Market Research and commentary ==
MKS PAMP provides research and commentary on precious metals markets, with its executives and analysts cited by international financial media on precious metals. Nicky Shiels, the company's head of research and metals strategy, has provided analysis on gold, silver and platinum group metals markets to Reuters, Bloomberg, CNBC, The Financial Times and The Wall Street Journal.

Reuters and The Wall Street Journal have separately cited MKS PAMP analysis on regional precious metals pricing and institutional and retail investment in precious metals.

== Sustainability ==
In 2022, MKS PAMP became the first precious-metals company to have science-based emissions reduction targets approved by the Science Based Targets initiative (SBTi).

In the same year, it launched a portfolio of products with carbon footprints independently verified by the Carbon Trust.

== Controversies and allegations ==
=== Allegations of bribery involving U.S. officials ===
In 2025, a meeting between Swiss business executives and U.S. President Donald Trump sparked a legal and ethical debate. MKS PAMP's CEO presented Trump with an engraved gold bar, while another executive gifted a Rolex desk clock, during discussions that preceded a U.S.-Swiss tariff agreement. Swiss legal experts noted that Article 322 of the Swiss Criminal Code forbids offering "an undue advantage" to a foreign official to influence official actions. They argued that expensive gifts could be considered an "undue advantage," and that a change in tariff policy could constitute a quid pro quo. MKS PAMP stated the gifts were intended for the Presidential Library and were cleared with White House ethics counsel, asserting full compliance with U.S. and Swiss law. Two Green Party Swiss parliamentarians called for an investigation by the Swiss Attorney-General's office. The Swiss government stated the meeting was a "private initiative".

=== Environmental and human rights concerns in supply chain ===
Between 2015 and 2016, gold from Liberia's New Liberty Mine, which experienced significant pollution events (including releases of cyanide and arsenic that contaminated waterways), was shipped to MKS PAMP's refinery in Switzerland. Affected communities reported health issues and filed a complaint with European development banks, leading to a formal mediation process.

In 2022, the Swiss Federal Court ruled against an NGO, the Society for Threatened Peoples, which sought import data from Swiss refiners including MKS PAMP. The Court upheld that such data was protected by tax and business secrecy laws. NGOs criticized the ruling as a setback for supply chain transparency.
