= List of companies of Switzerland =

Location of Switzerland

Switzerland is a federal republic in Europe. It is one of the most developed countries in the world, with the highest nominal wealth per adult and the eighth-highest per capita gross domestic product according to the IMF. Switzerland ranks at or near the top globally in several metrics of national performance, including government transparency, civil liberties, quality of life, economic competitiveness, and human development.

Switzerland's most important economic sector is manufacturing. Manufacturing consists largely of the production of specialist chemicals, health and pharmaceutical goods, scientific and precision measuring instruments and musical instruments. The largest exported goods are chemicals (34% of exported goods), machines/electronics (20.9%), and precision instruments/watches (16.9%). Exported services amount to a third of exports. The service sector – especially banking and insurance, tourism, and international organisations – is another important industry for Switzerland.

== Largest firms ==
This list shows firms in the Fortune Global 500, which ranks firms by total revenues reported before 31 March 2017. Only the top five firms (if available) are included as a sample.

Rank	Image	Name	2016 Revenues (US$M)	Employees	Notes
16		Glencore	173,883	93,123	Baar-based commodities trading and mining giant and the world's third-largest family business.
64		Nestlé	90,814	328,000	Transnational consumer goods conglomerate and the largest food and beverage company in the world. The firm has more than 8,000 brands, including Gerber, Carnation, and Lean Cuisine.
112		Zurich Insurance Group	67,245	52,473	Zürich-based full line insurance and financial services company operating in more than 170 countries.
169		Hoffmann-La Roche	53,427	94,052	Multinational healthcare company headquartered in Basel. Subsidiaries include Genentech (US) and Ventana Medical Systems (US).
186		Novartis	49,436	118,393	Multinational pharmaceutical company in Basel and one of the largest drug producers by both market cap and sales. Subsidiaries include Alcon and Chiron Corporation (US).

== Notable firms ==
This list includes notable companies with primary headquarters located in the country. The industry and sector follow the Industry Classification Benchmark taxonomy. Organizations which have ceased operations are included and noted as defunct.

Notable companies Status: P=Private, S=State; A=Active, D=Defunct
Name	Industry	Sector	Headquarters	Founded	Notes	Status	
A. Favre & Fils	Consumer goods	Clothing & accessories	Carouge	1737	Watches	P	A
ABB	Industrials	Industrial machinery	Västerås/Zürich	1988	Power and automation technology	P	A
Actelion	Health care	Pharmaceuticals	Allschwil	1997	Pharmaceuticals, subsidiary of Johnson & Johnson	P	A
Alchimie Forever	Consumer goods	Personal products	Geneva	2003	Skin care products	P	A
Alcon	Health care	Pharmaceuticals	Hünenberg	1945	Eye care products, part of Novartis	P	A
Allseas	Oil & gas	Pipelines	Châtel-Saint-Denis	1985	Pipelines, offshore services	P	A
Alpa	Consumer goods	Recreational products	Zürich	1918	Cameras	P	A
Alpiq	Utilities	Energy production	Baden	2009	Electric power	P	A
ALSO Holding	Technology	Software	Emmen	1984	IT distribution and consulting	P	A
Alternative Bank Switzerland	Financials	Banks	Olten	1990	Sustainability-oriented banking	P	A
AMAG Automobil- und Motoren	Consumer services	Specialty retailers	Zürich	1945	Car importer and dealerships	P	A
Amcor	Industrials	Containers & packaging	Zürich	1860	Packaging	P	A
Antiquorum	Consumer services	Specialized consumer services	Geneva	1974	Auction house	P	A
Aptiv	Consumer goods	Auto parts	Schaffhausen	1994	Automotive supplier	P	A
Ascom	Telecommunications	Mobile telecommunications	Baar	1987	Wireless	P	A
Atlanship	Industrials	Delivery services	La Tour-de-Peilz	1982	Freight transportation	P	A
Audemars Piguet	Consumer goods	Clothing & accessories	Le Brassus	1875	Watches	P	A
AutoForm	Technology	Software	Freienbach	1995	Software development	P	A
Axpo Holding	Utilities	Conventional electricity	Baden	2001	Electric power, owned by cantons	S	A
Baboo	Consumer services	Airlines	Geneva	2003	Airline, defunct 2010	P	D
Bally Shoe	Consumer goods	Footwear	Caslano	1851	Shoes, part of JAB Holding Company (Luxembourg)	P	A
Bâloise	Financials	Full line insurance	Caslano	1863	Insurance holding, merged with Helvetia	P	D
Bamix	Consumer goods	Durable household products	Inwil	1954	Blenders	P	A
Banque SYZ	Financials	Banks	Geneva	1996	Private bank	P	A
Barry Callebaut	Consumer goods	Food products	Zürich	1996	Cocoa and chocolate	P	A
Basilea Pharmaceutica	Health care	Pharmaceuticals	Basel	2000	Specialty pharma	P	A
Bata Shoes	Consumer goods	Footwear	Lausanne	1894	Shoe company	P	A
Bauhaus	Consumer services	Home improvement retailers	Belp	1960	Home improvement	P	A
Baumann & Cie, Banquiers	Financials	Banks	Basel	1920	Bank	P	A
BB Biotech	Financials	Equity investment instruments	Basel	1993	Investments in biotechnology companies	P	A
BDWM Transport	Consumer services	Travel & tourism	Bremgarten	2000	Passenger transport	P	A
Belair	Consumer services	Airlines	Opfikon	1925	Airline, defunct 2017	P	D
Bianchet	Consumer goods	Clothing & accessories	Neuchâtel	2017	Watches	P	A
Blancpain	Consumer goods	Clothing & accessories	Paudex	1735	Watches, part of Swatch Group	P	A
BLS AG	Industrials	Railroads	Bern	2006	Rail transport	S	A
Bolex	Consumer goods	Recreational products	Yverdon-les-Bains	1925	Motion picture cameras and lenses	P	A
Breguet	Consumer goods	Clothing & accessories	Vallée de Joux	1775	Watches, part of The Swatch Group	P	A
Breitling	Consumer goods	Clothing & accessories	Grenchen	1884	Watches	P	A
Bron Elektronik	Consumer goods	Recreational products	Allschwil	1958	Manufacturer of photography equipment	P	A
Brown, Boveri & Cie	Industrials	Electrical components & equipment	Baden	1891	Merged in 1988 with ASEA to form ABB	P	D
Bühler	Industrials	Industrial machinery	Uzwil	1860	Plant equipment manufacturer	P	A
Burckhardt Compression	Industrials	Industrial machinery	Winterthur	1844	Manufacturer of reciprocating compressors	P	A
BX Swiss	Financials	Investment services	Bern	1880	Stock exchange	P	A
Calida	Consumer goods	Clothing & accessories	Sursee	1858	Underwear	P	A
Caran d'Ache	Consumer goods	Nondurable household products	Geneva	1915	Writing instruments	P	A
Cargo Sous Terrain	Industrials	Delivery services	Basel	2013	Underground logistics system	P	A
Carl Maier & Cie	Industrials	Electrical components & equipment	Schaffhausen	1909	Electrical switchgear and protection devices, acquired by ABB in 1992	P	D
Century Time Gems	Consumer goods	Clothing & accessories	Nidau	1966	Watches	P	A
Certina	Consumer goods	Clothing & accessories	Le Locle	1888	Watches, part of Swatch Group	P	A
Charriol	Consumer goods	Clothing & accessories	Geneva	1983	Watches and jewellery	P	A
Chemins de fer du Jura	Consumer services	Travel & tourism	Tavannes	1944	Passenger rail	S	A
Chopard	Consumer goods	Clothing & accessories	Geneva	1860	Watches	P	A
Chubb	Financials	Full line insurance	Zürich	1985	Insurance products	P	A
Ciba Specialty Chemicals	Basic materials	Specialty chemicals	Basel	1997	Now part of BASF (Germany)	P	A
Clariant	Basic materials	Specialty chemicals	Muttenz	1995	Specialty chemicals	P	A
claro fair trade	Consumer services	Specialty retailers	Orpund	1977	Sustainability-oriented retail	P	A
Club Airways International	Consumer services	Airlines	Meyrin	2002	Corporate airline	P	A
Comlux	Consumer services	Airlines	Zürich	2003	Corporate charter airline	P	A
Compagnie Générale de Navigation sur le lac Léman	Industrials	Marine transportation	Lausanne	1873	Transport	P	A
Coop	Consumer services	Food retailers & wholesalers	Basel	1969	Supermarkets	P	A
Création Baumann	Consumer goods	Clothing & accessories	Langenthal	1886	Textile manufacturer	P	A
Credit Suisse	Financials	Banks	Zürich	1856	Banking holding, acquired by UBS	P	D
Crypto AG	Technology	Software	Steinhausen	1952	Communications and information security	P	A
Dartfish	Technology	Software	Fribourg	1999	Video software	P	A
Darwin Airline	Consumer services	Airlines	Lugano	2003	Regional airline, defunct 2017	P	D
Denner	Consumer services	Food retailers & wholesalers	Zürich	1860	Supermarkets, part of Migros	P	A
Digitec Galaxus	Consumer services	Specialty retailers	Zürich	2001	Home electronic retail chain	P	A
Dormakaba	Industrials	Business support services	Rümlang	1862	Security services	P	A
easyJet Switzerland	Consumer services	Airlines	Meyrin	1988	Part of EasyJet	P	A
Edelweiss Air	Consumer services	Airlines	Kloten	1995	Leisure airline	P	A
Edipresse	Consumer services	Publishing	Lausanne	1907	Magazine publishing	P	A
EF Education First	Consumer services	Specialized consumer services	Lund	1965	Language training	P	A
Elinchrom	Consumer goods	Recreational products	Renens	1962	Photography equipment	P	A
Emmi AG	Consumer goods	Food products	Lucerne	1907	Milk and dairy	P	A
Endura	Consumer goods	Clothing & accessories	Biel/Bienne	1966	Watches, part of The Swatch Group	P	A
Era Watch Company	Consumer goods	Clothing & accessories	Les Genevez	1884	Watches	P	A
Ex Libris	Consumer services	Specialty retailers	Dietikon	1949	Bookstore	P	A
Expert	Consumer goods	Specialty retailers	Zug	1967	Consumer electronics retailer	P	A
Ferring Pharmaceuticals	Health care	Pharmaceuticals	Saint-Prex	1950	Pharmaceuticals	P	A
Firmenich	Consumer goods	Personal products	Geneva	1895	Fragrances and flavor	P	A
Flug- und Fahrzeugwerke Altenrhein	Industrials	Aerospace	Thal	1948	Defunct 1987	P	D
Franke	Consumer goods	Personal & household goods	Aarburg	1911	Kitchen systems	P	A
Frédérique Constant	Consumer goods	Clothing & accessories	Geneva	1988	Watches	P	A
gategroup	Industrials	Transportation services	Zürich	1992	Airline catering and hospitality	P	A
Geberit	Industrials	Waste & disposal services	Rapperswil-Jona	1874	Sanitary technology	P	A
Georg Fischer	Industrials	Diversified industrials	Schaffhausen	1802	Pipelines, manufacturing, machinery	P	A
Gétaz-Miauton	Industrials	Industrial suppliers	Blonay – Saint-Légier	19th century	Building materials supplier	P	A
Girard-Perregaux	Consumer goods	Clothing & accessories	La Chaux-de-Fonds	1791	Watches	P	A
Givaudan	Consumer goods	Personal products	Vernier	1895	Fragrances and flavors	P	A
Glencore	Basic materials	General mining	Baar	1974	Mining and commodity trading	P	A
Globus	Consumer services	Broadline retailers	Spreitenbach	1907	Department stores	P	A
Glycine Watch SA	Consumer goods	Clothing & accessories	Biel/Bienne	1914	Watches	P	A
Greubel Forsey	Consumer goods	Clothing & accessories	La Chaux-de-Fonds	2004	Watches	P	A
Gunvor	Industrials	Marine transportation	Geneva	2000	Petroleum trading and shipping	P	A
Hamilton	Consumer goods	Clothing & accessories	Biel/Bienne	1892	Watches, part of The Swatch Group	P	A
Heliswiss	Consumer services	Airlines	Belp	1958	Helicopter operator	P	A
Helvetic Airways	Consumer services	Airlines	Kloten	2003	Airline	P	A
Hoffmann-La Roche	Health care	Pharmaceuticals	Basel	1896	Pharmaceuticals	P	A
Holcim	Industrials	Building materials & fixtures	Zug	1912	Construction material supplier	P	A
HSBC Private Bank	Financials	Banks	Geneva	1988	Banking	P	A
Hublot	Consumer goods	Clothing & accessories	Nyon	1980	Watches	P	A
Implenia	Industrials	Construction & materials	Dietlikon	2006	Heavy construction	P	A
Interhandel	Conglomerates	-	Basel	1928	Acquired in 1967	P	D
International Watch Company	Consumer goods	Clothing & accessories	Schaffhausen	1868	Watches, part of Richemont	P	A
IQAir	Industrials	Industrial suppliers	Goldach	1963	Air purifiers and filters	P	A
Jaeger-LeCoultre	Consumer goods	Clothing & accessories	Le Sentier	1833	Watches, part of Richemont	P	A
Jet Aviation	Industrials	Transportation services	Basel	1967	Aviation services	P	A
Jowissa	Consumer goods	Clothing & accessories	Bettlach	1951	Watches	P	A
Julius Baer Group	Financials	Banks	Zürich	1890	Private banking	P	A
Kabelwerke Brugg	Industrials	Diversified industrials	Brugg	1896	Cables, wire ropes, process control technology and pipe systems	P	A
Kempinski	Consumer services	Hotels	Geneva	1897	Hotels and resorts	P	A
Kudelski Group	Technology	Computer hardware	Cheseaux-sur-Lausanne	1951	Electronic media systems	P	A
Kuehne + Nagel	Industrials	Delivery services	Feusisberg	1890	Transport and logistics	P	A
Kuoni Travel	Consumer services	Travel & tourism	Zürich	1906	Tourism services	P	A
Leica Geosystems	Industrials	Electronic equipment	Au-Heerbrugg	1921	Surveying equipment	P	A
Liebherr	Industrials	Industrial machinery	Bulle	1949	Mechanical engineering	P	A
Lindt & Sprüngli	Consumer goods	Food products	Kilchberg	1845	Chocolatier	P	A
Lions Air	Consumer services	Airlines	Zürich	1986	Charter airline	P	A
Logitech	Technology	Computer hardware	Lausanne	1981	Computer peripherals	P	A
Lombard Odier & Cie	Financials	Banks	Geneva	1796	Private banking	P	A
Longines	Consumer goods	Clothing & accessories	Saint-Imier	1832	Watches, part of Swatch Group	P	A
Lonza Group	Basic materials	Specialty chemicals	Basel	1897	Chemicals and biotech	P	A
Maggi	Consumer goods	Food products	Cham	1884	Food, part of Nestlé	P	A
Manor	Consumer services	Broadline retailers	Basel	1902	Department store chain	P	A
Maurice Lacroix	Consumer goods	Clothing & accessories	Zürich	1975	Watches	P	A
Maxon Group	Industrials	Industrial machinery	Sachseln	1960	Electric motor drive systems	P	A
MB&F	Consumer goods	Clothing & accessories	Geneva	2005	Watches	P	A
Mediterranean Shipping Company	Industrials	Marine transportation	Geneva	1970	Shipping	P	A
Mercuria Energy Group	Industrials	Delivery services	Geneva	2004	Commodity trading	P	A
Métro Lausanne–Ouchy	Industrials	Railroads	Lausanne	1877	Defunct rail line	P	D
Mettler Toledo	Industrials	Electronic equipment	Greifensee	1989	Scientific instruments	P	A
Mido	Consumer goods	Clothing & accessories	Le Locle	1918	Watches, part of The Swatch Group	P	A
Migros	Consumer services	Food retailers & wholesalers	Zürich	1925	Supermarkets	P	A
Mondaine	Consumer goods	Clothing & accessories	Pfäffikon SZ	1944	Watches, part of the Mondaine Group	P	A
Mövenpick Hotels & Resorts	Consumer services	Hotels	Zürich	1973	Hospitality, tourism	P	A
MSC Cruises	Consumer services	Travel & tourism	Geneva	1960	Cruises	P	A
Nestlé	Consumer goods	Food & beverage	Vevey	1866	Food processing	P	A
Nobel Biocare	Health care	Medical equipment	Zürich	1981	Dental products	P	A
Nord Stream	Oil & gas	Pipelines	Zug	2005	Gas pipeline	P	A
Novartis	Health care	Pharmaceuticals	Basel	1996	Pharmaceuticals	P	A
OC Oerlikon	Industrials	Industrial suppliers	Pfäffikon	1973	Engineering and fibers	P	A
Omega	Consumer goods	Clothing & accessories	Biel/Bienne	1903	Watches, part of The Swatch Group	P	A
Oscilloquartz	Technology	Telecommunications equipment	Saint-Blaise	1949	Telecom technology	P	A
Panalpina	Industrials	Delivery services	Basel	1935	Logistics	P	A
Patek Philippe	Consumer goods	Clothing & accessories	Plan-les-Ouates	1839	Watches	P	A
Piaget	Consumer goods	Clothing & accessories	Geneva	1874	Watches and jewelry, part of Richemont	P	A
Pilatus Aircraft	Industrials	Aerospace	Stans	1939	Aircraft manufacturer	P	A
PLATIT	Industrials	Industrial machinery	Selzach	1992	Coating equipment	P	A
PrivatAir	Consumer services	Airlines	Meyrin	1977	Charter airline, defunct 2018	P	D
Radio Zürisee	Consumer services	Broadcasting & entertainment	Rapperswil	1983	Radio	P	A
Rehau Group	Industrials	Industrial suppliers	Muri, Bern	1948	Polymer-based products supplier	P	A
Repower	Utilities	Alternative electricity	Brusio	1904	Wind and hydro power	P	A
Richemont	Consumer goods	Clothing & accessories	Bellevue	1988	Luxury goods	P	A
Rieker	Consumer goods	Footwear	Thayngen	1874	Shoe manufacturer	P	A
Rieter	Industrials	Industrial machinery	Winterthur	1795	Textile machinery and automobile components	P	A
Ringier	Consumer services	Broadcasting & entertainment	Zürich	1833	Mass media	P	A
Roger Dubuis	Consumer goods	Clothing & accessories	Geneva	1995	Watches and jewelry, part of Richemont	P	A
Rolex	Consumer goods	Clothing & accessories	Geneva	1905	Watches	P	A
RosUkrEnergo	Industrials	Delivery services	Zug	2004	Gas transportation	P	A
Rotpunktverlag	Consumer services	Publishing	Zürich	1976	Publishing house	P	A
RUAG	Industrials	Aerospace & defense	Bern	1999	Aerospace engineering and defence industry	P	A
Sandoz	Health care	Pharmaceuticals	Basel	1886	Pharmaceuticals	P	A
SAPAL	Industrials	Containers & packaging	Lausanne	1906	Defunct 1989	P	D
Säuberlin & Pfeiffer	Industrials	Containers & packaging	Châtel-Saint-Denis	1896	Packaging, part of the Autajon group	P	A
Saurer	Industrials	Commercial vehicles & trucks	Arbon	1903	Trucks and buses, defunct 1982	P	D
Schindler Group	Industrials	Industrial machinery	Lucerne	1874	Escalators and elevators	P	A
Securitas	Industrials	Business support services	Zollikofen	1907	Security	P	A
Selecta	Consumer services	Specialty retailers	Kirchberg	1957	Vending company	P	A
Serono	Health care	Biotechnology	Geneva	1906	Biotechnology	P	A
Sersa Group	Industrials	Transportation services	Neuchâtel	1948	Railtrack construction and maintenance	P	A
SGS	Industrials	Business support services	Geneva	1878	Inspection, verification, testing and certification services	P	A
SIG Group	Industrials	Containers & packaging	Neuhausen am Rheinfall	1853	Packaging	P	A
SIG Sauer	Industrials	Defense	Neuhausen am Rheinfall	2000	Firearms	P	A
Sigg	Industrials	Containers & packaging	Frauenfeld	1908	Bottle manufacturer	P	A
Sihltal Zürich Uetliberg Bahn	Industrials	Railroads	Zürich	1875	Railway	P	A
Sika	Basic materials	Specialty chemicals	Baar	1910	Speciality chemicals	P	A
SITA	Technology	Computer hardware	Geneva	1949	IT and communication services	P	A
SkyWork Airlines	Consumer services	Airlines	Belp	1983	Airline	P	D
Sonova	Health care	Medical equipment	Stäfa	1947	Hearing instruments	P	A
ST-Ericsson	Technology	Semiconductors	Geneva	2009	Semiconductors, defunct 2013	P	D
Stadler Rail	Industrials	Commercial vehicles & trucks	Bussnang	1942	Rail car manufacturer	P	A
Stäubli	Industrials	Industrial machinery	Pfäffikon	1892	Textile machinery, connectors and robotics	P	A
STMicroelectronics	Technology	Semiconductors	Geneva	1957	Semiconductors	P	A
Südostbahn	Industrials	Railroads	St. Gallen	2001	Railways	S	A
Sulzer	Industrials	Diversified industrials	Winterthur	1834	Industrials and engineering	P	A
Sunrise Communications	Telecommunications	Fixed line telecommunications	Zürich	2000	Telecom	P	A
Sunstar Group	Consumer Goods/Engineered Components	Dental, Cosmetic, Automotive	Zürich	2002	Japanese founded 1932, moved to Zürich in 2002	P	A
Suva	Financials	Life insurance	Lucerne	1912	Health insurance	P	A
Swatch	Consumer goods	Clothing & accessories	Biel/Bienne	1983	Watches, part of Swatch Group	P	A
Swiss Bank Corporation	Financials	Banks	Basel	1854	The merger with Union Bank of Switzerland created UBS	P	D
SBB-CFF-FFS	Industrials	Railroads	Bern	1902	State railway	S	A
SwissGear	Consumer goods	Clothing & accessories	Delémont	2002	Clothing and luggage, part of Wenger	P	A
Swiss Global Air Lines (SWISS)	Consumer services	Airlines	Kloten	2005	Airline, part of Swiss International Air Lines, defunct 2018	P	D
Swiss International Air Lines	Consumer services	Airlines	Basel	2002	Airline, part of Lufthansa	P	A
Swiss Jewel	Industrials	Industrial suppliers	Tenero-Contra	1907	Synthetic jewels and high-precision products	P	A
Swiss Life	Financials	Life insurance	Zürich	1857	Life insurance	P	A
Swiss National Bank	Financials	Banks	Bern	1906	Central bank	S	A
Swiss Post	Industrials	Delivery services	Bern	1849	Postal services	S	A
Swiss Private Aviation	Consumer services	Airlines	Kloten	1984	Aviation services, part of Swiss International Air Lines	P	D
Swiss Re	Financials	Reinsurance	Zürich	1863	Reinsurance	P	A
Swissair	Consumer services	Airlines	Kloten	1931	Airline, defunct 2002	P	D
Swisscom	Telecommunications	Fixed line telecommunications	Ittigen	1997	Telecommunications	S	A
SwissP Defence	Industrials	Defense	Thun	1863	Ammunition	P	A
Swissport	Industrials	Transportation services	Opfikon	1996	Service company to airlines and airports	P	A
Syngenta	Consumer goods	Farming & fishing	Basel	2000	Seeds and pesticides	P	A
TAG Heuer	Consumer goods	Clothing & accessories	La Chaux-de-Fonds	1860	Watches	P	A
Tamedia	Consumer services	Publishing	Zürich	1893	Newspapers, magazines	P	A
Tecan	Health care	Medical equipment	Männedorf	1980	Laboratory instruments	P	A
Tesa SA	Industrials	Electronic equipment	Renens	1941	Measurement products	P	A
Tetra Pak	Industrials	Containers & packaging	Lund/Pully	1951	Food packaging	P	A
The Adecco Group	Industrials	Business training & employment agencies	Opfikon	1996	Staffing	P	A
The Pictet Group	Financials	Banks	Geneva	1805	Private banking	P	A
The Swatch Group	Consumer goods	Clothing & accessories	Biel/Bienne	1983	Watches, holding company	P	A
Tissot	Consumer goods	Clothing & accessories	Le Locle	1853	Watches, part of The Swatch Group	P	A
Trafigura	Financials	Financial services	Geneva	1993	Commodity trading	P	A
Transocean	Oil & gas	Exploration & production	Vernier	1973	Offshore drilling	P	A
Trisa	Consumer goods	Personal goods	Triengen	1887	Personal care products	P	A
u-blox	Technology	Computer hardware	Thalwil	1997	Computer hardware and software	P	A
UBS	Financials	Banks	Zürich	1862	Banking	P	A
Ulysse Nardin	Consumer goods	Clothing & accessories	Le Locle	1846	Watches	P	A
Uster Technologies	Industrials	Electronic equipment	Uster	2003	Electronics	P	A
Vacheron Constantin	Consumer goods	Clothing & accessories	Geneva	1755	Watches, part of Richemont	P	A
Vaudoise Assurances	Financials	Full line insurance	Lausanne	1895	Insurance	P	A
Vetropack	Industrials	Containers & packaging	Bülach	1911	Glass packaging	P	A
Victorinox	Consumer goods	Recreational products	Ibach	1884	Manufacturer of Swiss Army knives	P	A
Vidby	Technology	Software	Risch-Rotkreuz	2021	AI-based language translator for videos	P	A
Von Roll	Industrials	Electrical components & equipment	Breitenbach	1803	Electrical components & equipment, part of Altana	P	A
Waltham Watch Company	Consumer goods	Clothing & accessories	Marin-Epagnier	1850	Watches	P	A
Weatherford International	Oil & gas	Oil equipment & services	Baar	1941	Oilfield services	P	A
Weleda	Consumer goods	Personal products	Arlesheim	1921	Natural beauty products	P	A
Wenger	Consumer goods	Recreational products	Delémont	1893	Swiss army knives	P	A
Xstrata	Basic materials	General mining	Zug	1926	Mining, merged with Glencore	P	D
Zenith	Consumer goods	Clothing & accessories	Le Locle	1865	Watches	P	A
Zephyr Surgical Implants	Health care	Medical equipment	Geneva	2005	Urinary sphincters and penile implants	P	A
Zimex Aviation	Consumer services	Airlines	Opfikon	1969	Aircraft leases	P	A
Zurich Insurance Group	Financials	Full line insurance	Zürich	1872	Insurance	P	A
Zürichsee-Schifffahrtsgesellschaft	Industrials	Marine transportation	Zürich	1890	Transport	P	A

== See also ==
- Economy of Switzerland
