= Repower =

Repower may refer to:

- Repowering, the process of replacing older power stations with newer ones
- REpower Systems, a German wind turbine company
- Repower (Swiss company), a Swiss energy utility
