= Rudolf Huber (industrialist) =

Swiss industrialist (1839–1924)

- Born: 18 February 1839; Zürich, Switzerland
- Died: 22 March 1924 (aged 85); Pfäffikon, Switzerland
- Occupation: Industrialist
- Spouses: Katharina Bopp (m. 1862) Maria Anna Räber (m. 1866)

Rudolf Huber (18 February 1839 – 22 March 1924) was a Swiss industrialist who founded the cable and wire firm that became R. & E. Huber AG, a predecessor of HUBER+SUHNER.

== Biography ==
Huber was the son of Rudolf. He married first, in 1862, Katharina Bopp of Unterhallau (now Hallau), and second, in 1866, Maria Anna Räber of Küssnacht. Orphaned at the age of seven, he was raised in the orphanage of the city of Zürich. He then served an apprenticeship as a mechanic with his uncle Heinrich Ryffel at Wetzikon. As a workshop foreman in a mechanical-engineering firm at Arth, he was also active in the textile trade (1859), and became a partner in a cotton mill at Dürnten in 1872.

In 1880 Huber acquired the Hinter dem Hecht factory at Pfäffikon, where from 1882 he produced cotton yarn and metal thread for the fashion industry. In 1885 he began manufacturing insulated wires for the new electrical industry, notably for the Maschinenfabrik Oerlikon, and together with his son Emil—who had trained in Germany and the United States—founded a specialized firm (renamed R. & E. Huber AG, Swiss cable, wire, and rubber works, in 1907). At Huber's death the company employed more than 400 people and was an important supplier to the electrical and communications industries in Switzerland, as well as to other branches.

== Bibliography ==
- H. R. Schmid, 75 Jahre R. & E. Huber Aktiengesellschaft, schweizerische Kabel-, Draht- und Gummiwerke, Pfäffikon-Zürich, 1957
- H. U. Staub, Heimatbuch der Gemeinde Pfäffikon, 1962, 343–347
