= Reishauer =

Swiss machine tool builder

- Type: Joint-stock company
- Industry: Machine tool builder
- Headquarters: Wallisellen, canton of Zürich, Switzerland
- Area served: Worldwide
- Products: Gear Grinding Machines
- Website: www.reishauer.com

Reishauer is a Swiss machine tool builder based in Wallisellen, which manufactures gear grinding machines.

The company was founded in 1788 by the toolmaker Hans Jakob Däniker as a craft enterprise in Zurich. In 1870, the company was officially registered as a tool factory. In 1945, the first continuous generating gear grinding machine, ZA, was launched on the market, introducing a form of gear grinding that is today known as the Reishauer process. Soon after this, production expanded to gear parts outside machine-tool-engineering and met the requirements of the aircraft industry and the automotive industry. Reishauer AG is a subsidiary of Reishauer Beteiligungen AG, to which the German Felsomat AG has been a part of since 2010. The most important customers are the automotive industry and its suppliers.

Reishauer manufactures: gear grinding machines, grinding and dressing tools, clamping systems, and automation solutions. All components are supplied from one source with more than 80% vertical integration. Reishauer describes its performance system as a Circle of Competence, in which all machine components, tooling, and automation are manufactured in-house.

== History ==
=== Foundation as a toolmaker (from 1788) ===
The company was founded in 1788 by the toolmaker Hans Jakob Däniker as a craft enterprise in Zurich. Däniker's son Gottfried Reishauer trained as a toolmaker in the business and took over the management in 1824. In 1870, the company was officially registered as a tool factory. In 1882, the Aktiengesellschaft für Fabrikation Reishauer'scher Werkzeuge was founded, and the portfolio was expanded to include thread gauges in addition to thread cutting tools.

=== The step to mechanical engineering (from 1924) ===
As the thread grinding machines that were currently available on the market did not meet Reishauer's requirements, they designed their own thread grinding machine in 1924. The RK Gewinde started to work in the factory in 1928 and marked the step towards becoming a machine tool manufacturer. In 1931, the first in-house made machine for grinding taps was put into operation. Soon Reishauer began to produce the machines not only for his own needs but also to sell them to other companies. This enabled the company to bridge the declining demand for tools in the years after 1929.

=== The introduction of the continuous generating grinding process and the rise to become an international company (from 1945) ===
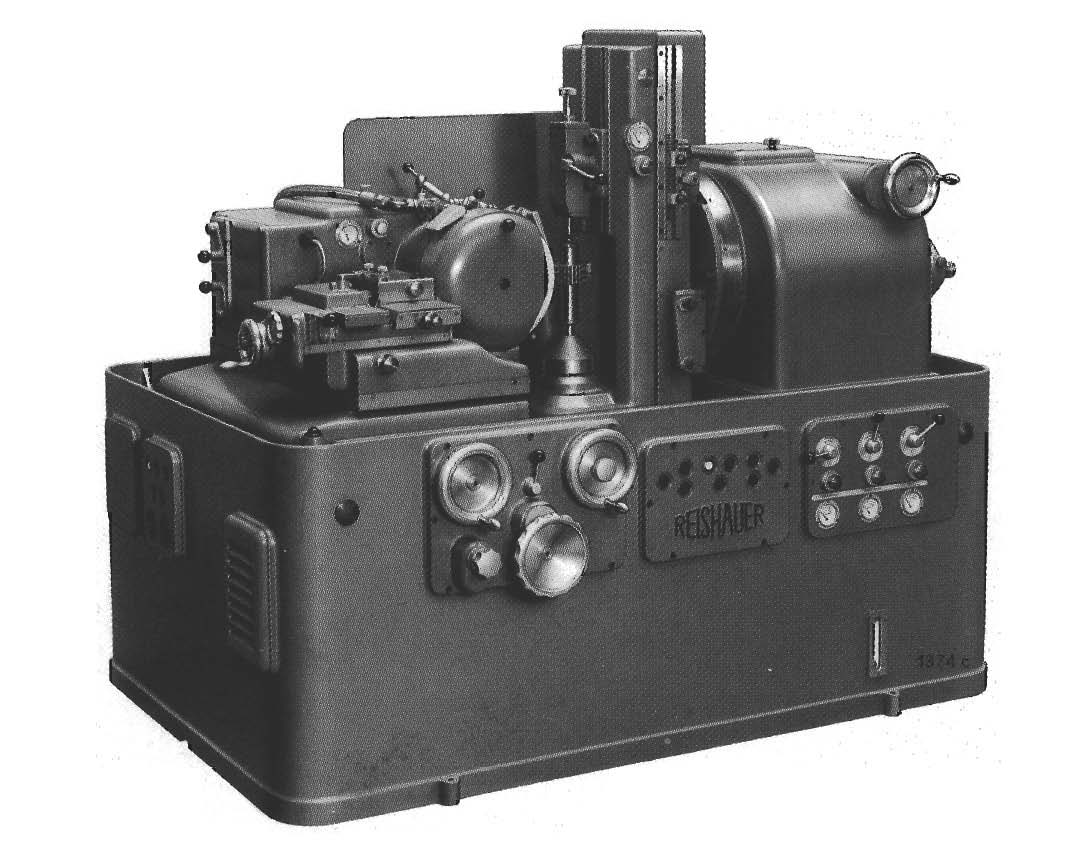
Reishauer generating gear grinding machine ZA from 1945

In 1945, the first continuous generating gear grinding machine, ZA, was launched on the market, introducing a form of gear grinding, today known as the Reishauer process. This machine had been preceded by a 15-year development period, as Reishauer wanted to find a more accurate, faster, and cheaper method of manufacturing gears. 1968, the AZA, a new gear grinding machine, was produced. The AZA was based on the same continuous generating process but allowed one person to operate several grinders at the same time, thanks to streamlining the operating process. Reishauer thus took the first step towards automating the gear grinding process. At the same time, production at Reishauer's customers expanded to gear parts outside machine tool engineering, and included gears for printing machines, trucks, tractors, and pumps. The electronic generating gearbox, introduced in 1977 with the RZ300E, ensured a level of precision that met the requirements of the aircraft industry. In 1986, the RZ301S enhanced generating grinding with shift grinding, which enabled constant grinding forces and higher profile accuracy. In 1993, the RZ362A, the first high-performance gear grinding machine, made its entry into the automotive industry. With this machine, Reishauer introduces the Low Noise Shifting (LNS) process, which reduced unwanted gear noise. In 1998, the company started its own diamond tool production and laid the foundation for its performance system, the Circle of Competence.

=== Universal machine and technological development (from 2001) ===
In 2001, the RZ400, the first universal machine, was launched on the market. It included the electronic generating gearbox developed by Reishauer with interfering signal suppression and extremely high drive rigidity. Furthermore, the RZ400 featured a Windows user interface, safety monitoring of the drive axes, and grinding at 63 m/s cutting speed and dressing of and grinding with multi-start threaded grinding wheels. With the RZ150, developed in 2003, two-spindle technology was introduced, which achieved a further increase in productivity. The machine was specially designed for automotive transmission gears. 2006 saw the launch of the RZ1000, which, just like the RZ400, was particularly adapted to job shops.

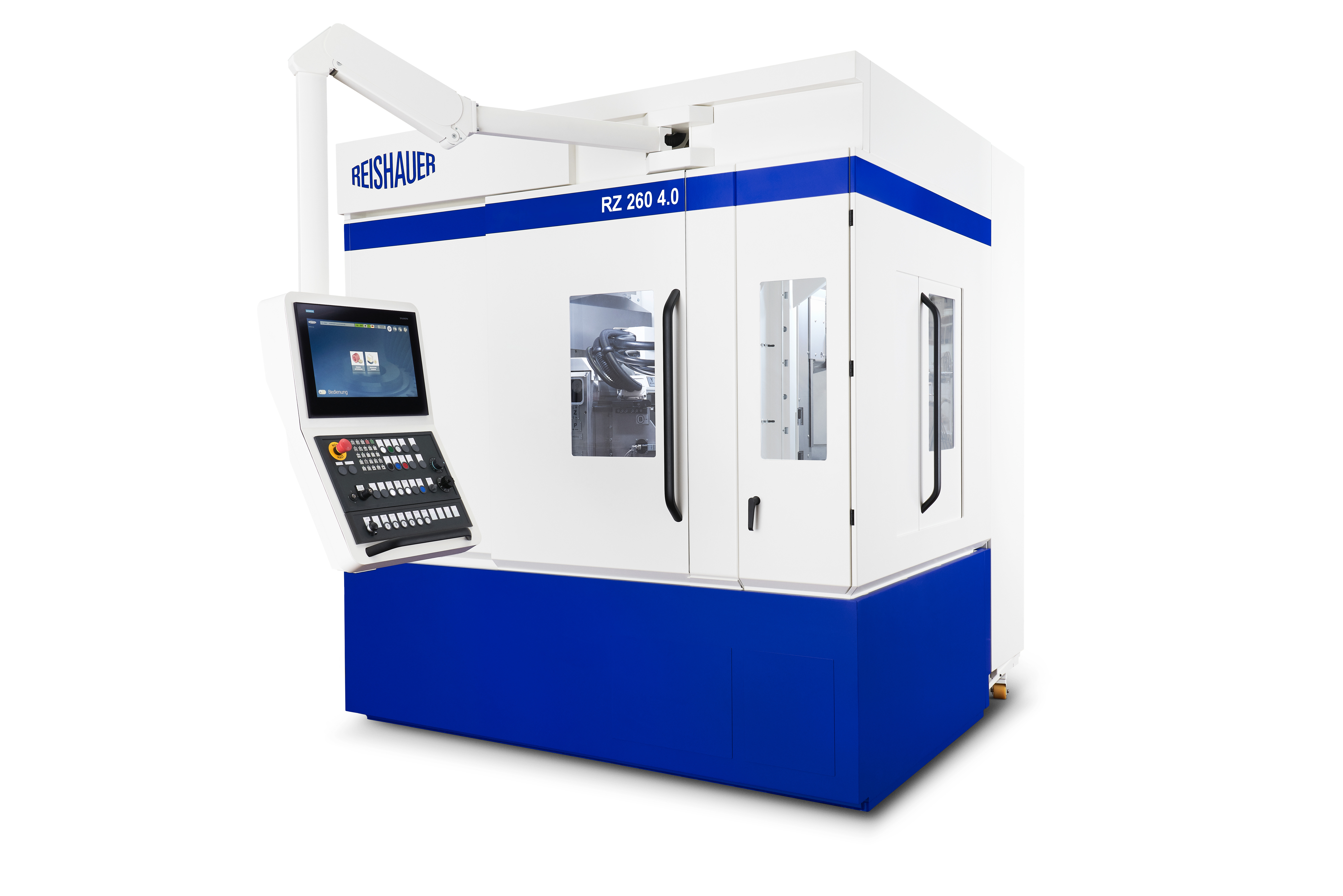
Gear grinding machine RZ 260 4.0

In 2008, Reishauer started the production of vitrified grinding wheels and built a new fully automated plant for this purpose in Pfaffnau, the canton of Lucerne, Switzerland. In 2009, the RZ60 series (RZ60, 160, 260) was designed, mainly for the automotive industry, but also for job shops, and further increased the productivity of the Reishauer process. In 2010, Reishauer started the development of clamping devices, which were launched in 2012. In 2014, Reishauer automation was introduced as part of the company's own performance system.Based on the existing machine concept, the fully connectable RZ x60 4.0 series and the KWS series with a smaller grinding tool were developed and launched in 2020.

=== Reishauer RS 300 ===
Reishauer has expanded its technology portfolio with hard-skiving to address existing and future gearbox architectures. The RS 300 is a machine tool specifically designed for hard-skiving operations on internal and external gears. Its main application is the hard-finishing of internal gears with workpiece diameters up to 300 mm. The machine enables economical hard-fine machining and meets the increasing precision requirements associated with tight tolerances. The RS 300 complements Reishauer’s established machine range, as hard-skiving with Reishauer tooling technology provides a productive and flexible solution for the hard finishing of internal gears and external gears featuring interfering contours. Optional equipment includes automation interfaces, tool-changer systems, and monitoring technologies such as ARGUS. The machine is operated with Siemens SINUMERIK ONE and Reishauer’s RSControl software.

Technological Feature A central technological feature of the RS 300 is Twist Control Skiving, which enables targeted modification of the gear flank geometry.

=== Reishauer RZ 410 4.0 ===
The Reishauer RZ 410 4.0 is a universal gear grinding machine designed for finishing small to medium-sized gears. It supports grinding gear diameters from 5 to 410 mm and module sizes from 0.5 to 10 mm, making it well-suited for prototype manufacturing and medium production volumes. The machine shares its technological platform with the larger RZ 550 4.0 and RZ 1000 4.0 models. It offers a full range of grinding and dressing processes, including generating and profile grinding, line dressing, and topological dressing. The RZ 410 4.0 features a thermally stable machine structure and a high-precision workpiece spindle, ensuring consistent accuracy. With its RZControl interface, setup procedures and data handling are simplified through guided menus and integrated database technologies. The machine can also be equipped with the ARGUS process monitoring system for enhanced transparency and control of the grinding process.

== Corporate structure ==
Reishauer AG is a subsidiary of Reishauer Beteiligungen AG, to which the German Felsomat AG has been part since 2010. The most important customers are the automotive industry and its suppliers. Reishauer has branches in Germany, France, Japan, China, and the USA.

== Products ==
Reishauer manufactures gear grinding machines, grinding and dressing tools, clamping systems, and automation solutions. All components are supplied from one source with more than 80% vertical integration. Machines specifically customized for each customer. Reishauer offers complete systems for the production of high-quality gears, including loading and unloading systems for its gear grinding machines. Almost 100% of the products are exported. Reishauer describes its performance system as a Circle of Competence, in which all machine components, tooling, and automation are manufactured in-house.

=== Digital products ===
The ARGUS Monitoring System, first introduced in 2019, is Reishauer’s initial comprehensive digital monitoring solution. It analyzes dressing and grinding processes in real time and additionally evaluates the condition of selected machine components. Through the ARGUS WebApp, users can access and interpret process data, frequency analyses, and component information.

ARGUS enables the early detection of process deviations, incorrect dressing operations, and potentially noise-critical gears. Based on data-driven assessment, gears that fall outside defined tolerances can be identified and removed from the production flow. The system supports preventive maintenance and contributes to optimizing overall equipment effectiveness. ARGUS can also be retrofitted to many existing machines.

Closed Loop Method

The Closed Loop method enables the digital transfer of measurement data back to the gear grinding machine. This reduces the risk of input errors and accelerates the setup process. Measurement values from SPC parts can be imported without manual data allocation, resulting in more stable series production and consistent adherence to tolerances.

myReishauer Web Platform

The myReishauer platform, introduced in 2023, provides a central access point to Reishauer’s digital products and eLearning content. The platform displays process information in a structured format and enables analysis down to the level of individual workpieces. It also includes training areas that can be configured for different user groups.

Digital Services and System Integration

Reishauer continuously expands its portfolio of digital solutions to support process analysis, machine integration, and predictive maintenance. These systems facilitate a range of Industry 4.0 applications, including:

- process data analysis,
- integration with manufacturing execution systems (MES),
- condition monitoring of machine components,
- and the application of data-driven optimization methods.

The digital products complement the mechanical and technological capabilities of Reishauer machines and contribute to increased productivity and process reliability.

== See also ==
- List of Swiss companies
- Wikipedia entry Reishauer in German
