= Rudolf Huber =

Topics referred to by the same term

Rudolf Huber may refer to:

- Rudolf Huber (industrialist) (1839–1924), Swiss industrialist, founder of R. & E. Huber AG
- Rudolf Huber (alpine skier) (born 1963), Austrian alpine skier
