= Tesa =

Tesa may refer to:

- Tesa SA, a Swiss company manufacturing precision measurement products
- Tesa SE, a German company manufacturing adhesive products
- Tésa, a village in Hungary
- Tesa Schwans, American politician
- Tesa Vilar (born 1995), Slovenian cyclist

== See also ==
- Tessa
