= Rescale =

Software technology company

Rescale, Inc.
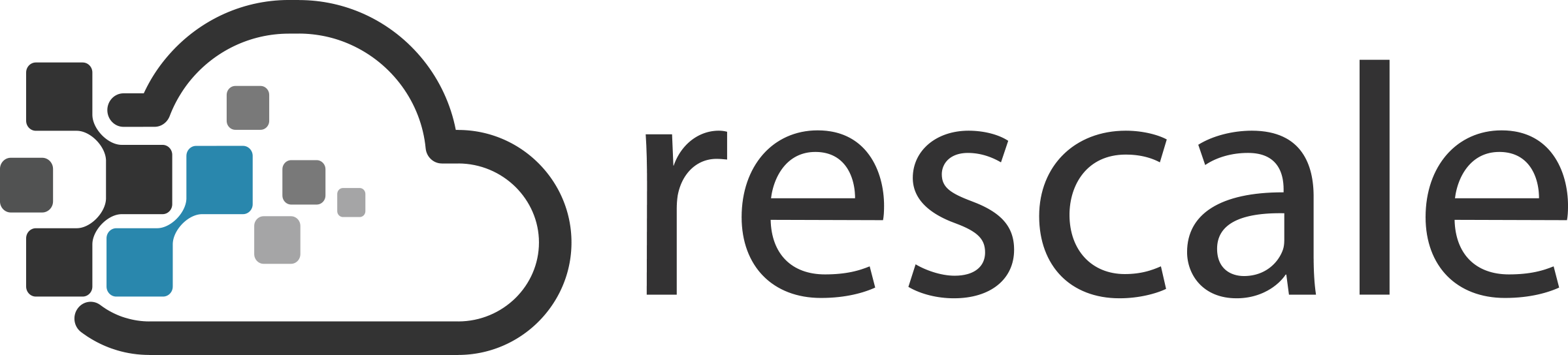
- Industry: Software
- Founded: 2011
- Founder: Joris Poort; Adam McKenzie
- Headquarters: San Francisco, California
- Products: Cloud computing
- Number of employees: 180
- Website: rescale.com

Rescale is a software technology company that provides "Intelligent Computing for Digital R&D", with a focus on high-performance computing, cloud management, and computer aided engineering.

== Overview ==
Rescale helps organizations across industries accelerate science and engineering breakthroughs by eliminating computing complexity. Rescale offers high-performance computing as-a-service to organizations through automation on a hybrid cloud control plane with security, architecture, and financial controls. Design Engineering magazine describes Rescale as "...a good fit for manufacturers who need to run complex simulation and optimization jobs, but don't have the HPC hardware required."

As of 2015, Rescale established the largest globally available HPC network which enables hybrid and multi-cloud operations across major cloud service providers and on-premises data centers. Rescale provides IT and HPC practitioners with access to computing architectures targeted to workloads in the aerospace, automotive, pharmaceutical, computational genomics, manufacturing, electronic design automation, and semiconductor industries.

== History ==
Founded in 2011 in San Francisco, California, by Joris Poort (CEO) and Adam McKenzie (CTO), Rescale launched in Y Combinator and has been recognized as a top company multiple times, and as recently as 2023. At Boeing, Poort and McKenzie, the founders, created software technology that achieved $180 million in savings by optimizing the 787 Dreamliner's weight.

== Investors ==
Rescale received investment funding from high-profile investors including Sam Altman, Jeff Bezos, Richard Branson, Chris Dixon, Paul Graham, and Peter Thiel. Notable corporate and venture capital investors include Nvidia, M12 (venture capital) arm of (Microsoft), Hitachi, Samsung, Initialized Capital, and Andreessen Horowitz. By 2022, Rescale had raised over $200 million and reached a valuation of over $1 billion, making it the first unicorn company in cloud high performance computing.

== Partnerships ==
Rescale has strategic partnerships with major cloud infrastructure providers Amazon Web Services, Microsoft Azure, Google Cloud Platform, and Oracle Cloud Platform and with engineering software companies in the computer aided engineering space including ANSYS, AutoForm, Siemens Digital Industries Software, Dassault Systèmes and MSC Software.

== See also ==
- Cloud computing
- Enterprise software
- High performance computing
- Computer aided engineering
- Product lifecycle management
- Software-defined infrastructure
- Digital Twin
- Multidisciplinary design optimization
