= Innovazione =

Swiss department store chain

- Type: SA (1928–2000)
- Industry: Retail
- Founded: 1911
- Founder: Marx Lévy; Ernest Maus
- Defunct: 2000
- Fate: Integrated into Manor chain
- Successor: Manor Sud SA
- Headquarters: Lugano, Switzerland
- Products: Department stores, shopping centers, DIY centers, restaurants, supermarkets
- Revenue: 300+ million CHF (2000)
- Number of employees: ~1,500 (late 20th century)

Innovazione was a Swiss department store chain based in Ticino that operated from 1911 to 2000. Founded as a haberdashery business in Lugano, it grew to become the canton's leading retailer before being integrated into the Manor chain.

== History ==
Innovazione was established in Lugano in 1911 as a haberdashery commerce by Marx Lévy and Ernest Maus, initially employing six people. The business expanded significantly, becoming a department store in 1925 with 146 employees. By this time, it had already established branches in the main centres of Ticino.

In 1928, Innovazione was transformed into a société anonyme (SA). The company continued its expansion throughout the canton, consolidating its position as a major regional retailer.

In 1952 Innovazione SA absorbed the Milliet & Werner department stores, establishing itself as the canton's retail sector leader.

By the end of the 20th century, Innovazione had grown into a diversified retail operation with approximately fifteen points of sale. These included department stores, shopping centers, DIY centers, restaurants, and supermarkets. The company employed around 1,500 staff members and generated annual revenue exceeding 300 million Swiss francs.

=== Integration into Manor ===
In 2000, these longstanding connections led to Innovazione's integration into the Manor (Maus) chain. Although the Ticino-based company abandoned the Innovazione name, it retained an autonomous designation as Manor Sud SA.

== Bibliography ==
- 35 anni Innovazione SA 1911-1946, 1946
- Ticino economico, 1989–1990, pp. 278-279
