= Cargo Sous Terrain =

Planned underground logistics system in Switzerland

Logo of Cargo Sous Terrain

Cargo Sous Terrain (abbreviated to CST; French language, literally: "Underground Cargo") is a planned underground logistics system in Switzerland. It was set up as an association (Förderverein Cargo sous terrain) in September 2013, and was based at the headquarters of the Swiss retailer Coop in Basel. It converted itself into a share company (CST AG) on 24 March 2017.

== Description ==
The providers claim to establish a complete, automated, flexible and durable underground cargo system which allows the transport of pallets and crates for packages, individual items, break bulk cargo and bulk goods, as well as their intermediate storage. Tunnels are scheduled to connect the sites of production and logistics. In the municipalities, under ground cargo is scheduled to distribute the goods by environmentally friendly vehicles in cooperation with partners of the Swiss retail syndicate IG DHS (Interessengemeinschaft Detailhandel Schweiz), among them Coop, Denner, Manor and Migros, Rhenus Logistics, Swisscom and Swiss Post. The privately owned company claims also to contribute to waste disposal.

The Swiss national logistics provider SBB Cargo pulled out of the project

== Network ==
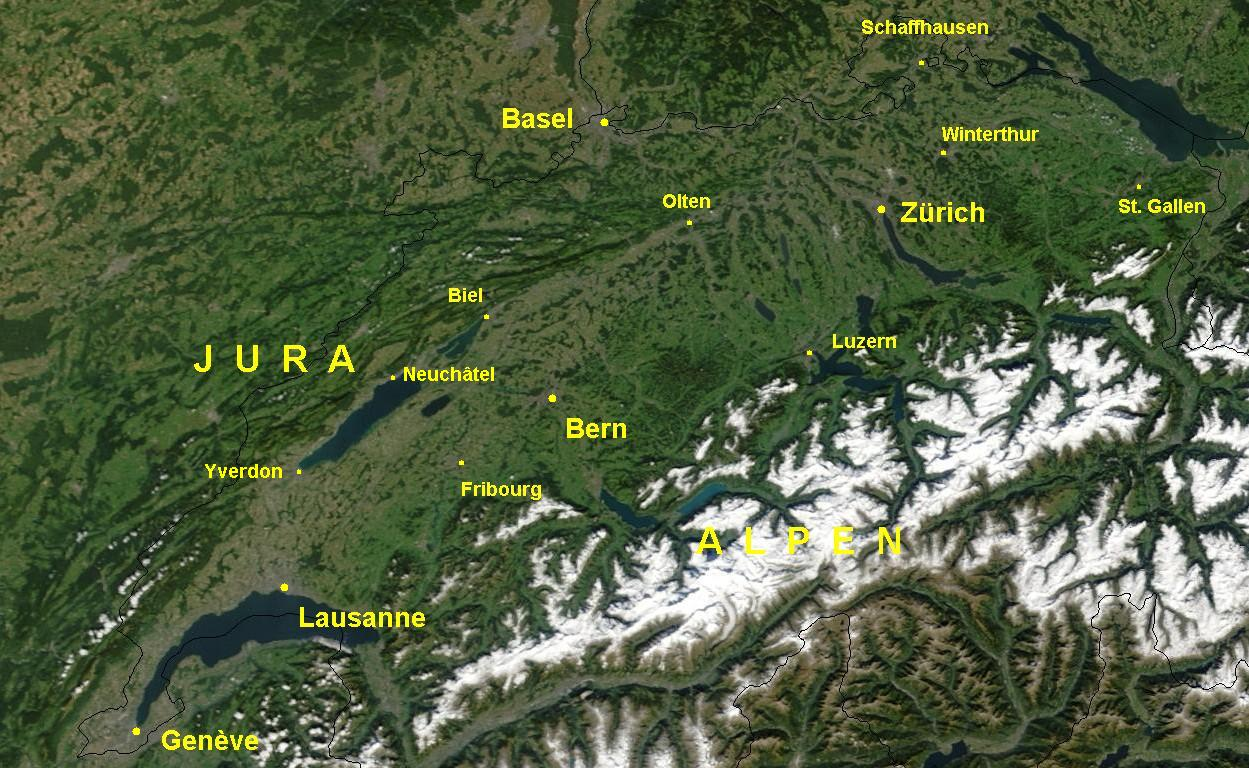
Map of the Mittelland region of Switzerland

The new type of underground freight infrastructure will be complementary to the Swiss road and rail network, and relieve it at critical points. The first scheduled section of about 66.7 kilometres (41.4 mi) in the central Swiss Plateau (Mittelland) will connect Härkingen/Niederbipp and the city of Zürich from the early 2030s. Later, a comprehensive network is planned between the Bodensee in eastern Switzerland and Lake Geneva in western Switzerland, with offshoots to Basel and Luzern.

The tunnels will be built at a depth of up to 50 metres (164 ft) and have a diameter of 6 metres (19 ft 8 in). In these tubes, three tracks will be placed, one in each direction plus a service lane in the middle, operating fully automated and unmanned vehicles which can transport two EUR-pallets and containers. Via ramps or lifts, these small vehicles, powered by electromagnetic induction, will load and unload automatically. The initiators believe that the vehicles will be able to travel round the clock and round the year at a speed of 30 kilometres per hour (18.6 mph). An additional monorail system for packages, suspended in the crown of the tunnel, may run at twice that speed.

On 20 April 2016 the government of the Canton of Zürich announced that it had reservations, because it was still unclear whether CST would relieve congestion in the most important cantonal municipalities. In principle, the government welcomes the swap of goods to a separate mode of transport. According to the current level of knowledge it is questionable whether CST will benefit even the largest towns, since the traffic reduction would largely be on the interurban routes, while local road or rail distribution would increase traffic around the hubs. The government therefore asked the providers to clarify this aspect.

The main shareholders Migros, Coop, Swisscom, Swiss Post, Credit Suisse, Zürcher Kantonalbank, Mobiliar and Helvetia as well as the foreign partner Meridiam from France will contribute 100 million Swiss francs; the Swiss federal authorities have to ensure the legal framework for the project, the Executive Board announced at a media conference on 23 January 2018. Originally Dagong Global Investment Group from China was one of the foreign partners as well. However, in 2020 CST distanced themselves from investments from China.

== Costs (first phase) ==
The total cost for the first phase are estimated at 3.55 Billion Swiss Francs (CHF) of which 71 percent are scheduled for the construction of the tunnel. For matters of expense include CHF 282 million for the planning, CHF 344 million on the construction of ten hubs for loading and unloading. CHF 410 million francs are intended for the procurement of the vehicles.

== See also ==
- Chicago Tunnel Company, a historical example of an underground freight network
- The Boring Company
- Tunnel construction
- Underground construction
