= Joris Poort =

American businessman and entrepreneur (born 1983)

- Born: July 5, 1983; 43 years ago Nijmegen, Netherlands
- Education: University of Michigan (B.S.); University of Washington (M.S.); Harvard Business School (M.B.A.)
- Occupations: President & CEO of Rescale

Joris Poort (born July 5, 1983) is an American businessman and entrepreneur. He is the founder and chief executive officer of the enterprise software firm Rescale.

Silicon Valley insiders have referred to Poort as "a silent genius". He is known for developing innovative computing technologies for engineers and scientists evangelizing use of high-performance computing and supercomputing in the cloud.

== Early life and education ==
Born in the Netherlands, Poort moved to the United States and attended University of Michigan, where he graduated magna cum laude, obtaining a B.S. in mechanical engineering and minor in applied mathematics. After University of Michigan, Poort attended University of Washington, graduating magna cum laude, obtaining a M.S. in aerospace engineering. Poort also attended Harvard Business School, where he received an MBA, graduating with distinction.

== Career ==
=== Boeing ===
Poort started his career at Boeing working as an engineer on the 787 Dreamliner airline program at Boeing Commercial Airlines. His work at Boeing included significant contributions to the development of the first carbon fiber composite wing design for commercial aircraft through multi-disciplinary optimization and machine learning algorithms providing significant weight reduction, cost savings, and delighting the airline industry referring to the design as "poetry in motion" due to its unique design.

=== McKinsey & Company ===
In 2010, Poort worked as a consultant for McKinsey & Company in the Amsterdam office.

=== Rescale ===
In 2011, Poort founded Rescale a cloud computing platform for simulation in large enterprises across aerospace, manufacturing, energy, and life sciences verticals. Rescale has raised funding from notable investors including Sam Altman, Jeff Bezos, Richard Branson, Chris Dixon, Paul Graham, and Peter Thiel. By 2021, Rescale funding topped $100 million including the backing of Microsoft, Nvidia, Samsung, Hitachi, and others becoming the "dominant company" for high-performance computing in the cloud. By 2022, Rescale funding exceeded $200 million with a valuation of over $1B, making it the first unicorn company in cloud high performance computing.

=== World Economic Forum ===
Poort was selected by the World Economic Forum as a Global Innovator participating in the 2023 Annual Meeting as part of the Unicorn Track, in part for its contributions to promote sustainable computing, advanced manufacturing, and acceleration of R&D innovation process in various industries.
