= Gottlieb Suhner =

Swiss industrialist (1842–1918)

- Born: 27 November 1842; Stein, Switzerland
- Died: 9 October 1918 (aged 75); Küsnacht, Switzerland
- Occupation: Industrialist
- Spouses: Johanna Signer (m. 1865); Elise Alwine Steiger (m. 1902)

Gottlieb Suhner (27 November 1842 – 9 October 1918) was a Swiss industrialist who founded the firm that became Huber & Suhner AG, the most important industrial enterprise in Appenzell Ausserrhoden.

== Biography ==
Suhner was the son of Hans Jakob, a poor smallholder, and of Anna Barbara Alder. He married first, in 1865, Johanna Signer, daughter of Johannes, a master joiner, and second, in 1902, Elise Alwine Steiger, daughter of Jonas, a man of independent means. In 1864 he opened a mechanical workshop in his father-in-law's house for the manufacture of spare parts for weaving and embroidery looms, developing several inventions. He also operated an embroidery business until around 1890 and managed a network of home-based work.

In 1892 Suhner acquired a wire mill in Basel, which he transferred to Herisau to convert into an electrical cable works, and added a rubber factory in 1905. He thus created the most important industrial enterprise in Appenzell Ausserrhoden, the future Huber & Suhner AG. To preserve his company's independence, he refused in 1895 a merger with BBC of Baden, his principal customer, and instead chose in 1896 to found a subsidiary at Brugg (later Kabelwerke Brugg AG). A pioneer of workers' housing construction in Appenzell Ausserrhoden, Suhner withdrew from the company in 1906.

== Bibliography ==
- Appenzellische Jahrbücher, 47, 1920, 103–109
- P. Holderegger, Unternehmer im Appenzellerland, especially 202–204
- Th. Fuchs et al., Herisau, 1999, 210, 229, 248, 254
