= Underground construction =

Field of engineering for the design and construction of structures below the ground

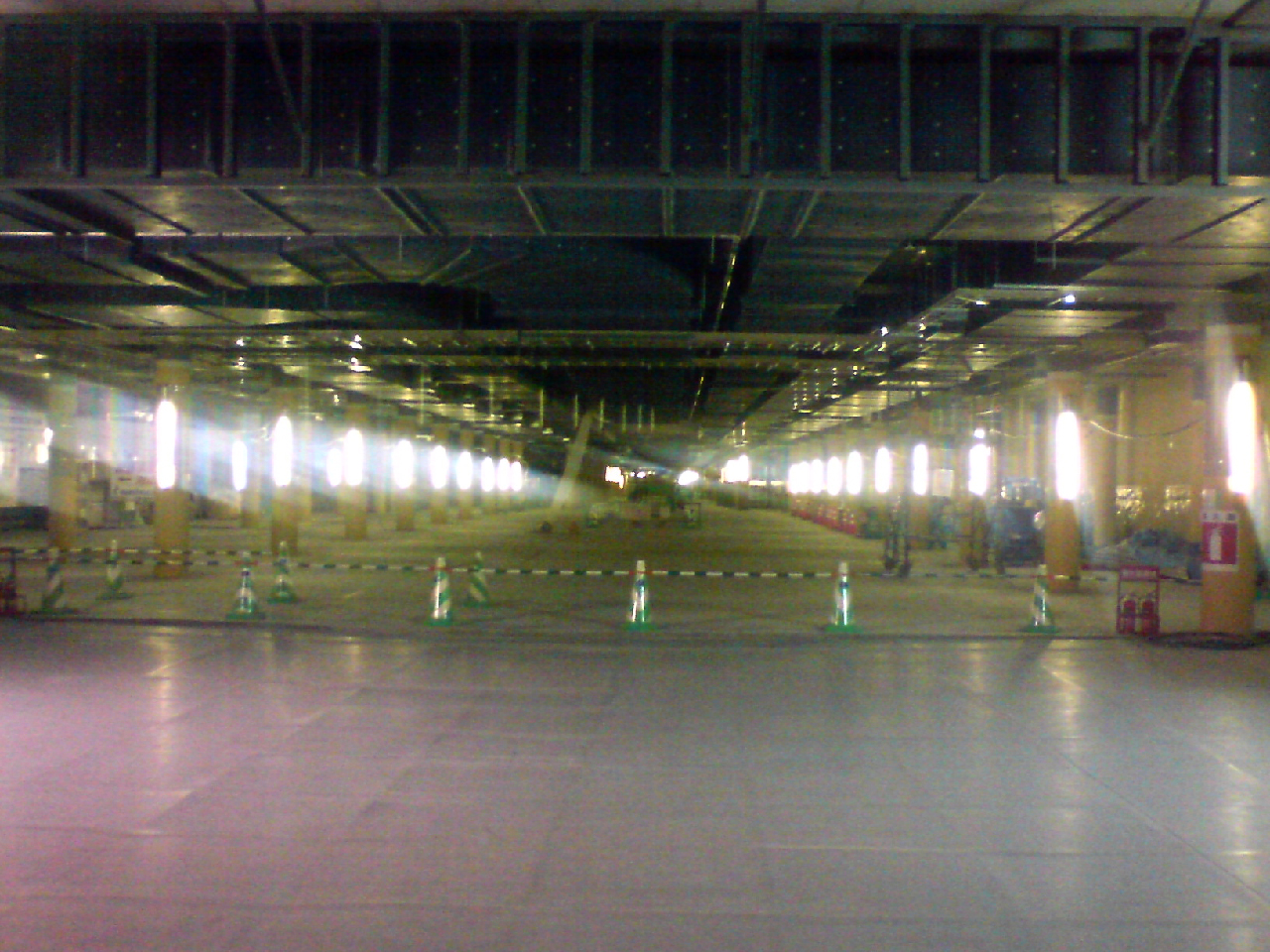
Underground construction in Sapporo, Japan

Underground construction refers to the construction of underground tunnels, shafts, chambers, and passageways. It is also sometimes used to describe the portion of traditional construction that takes place below ground.

== History ==
Neanderthals also engaged in underground construction, but they were believed to be less sophisticated in that regard, than humans. Neanderthal construction sites in France have been dated to 174,000 bc, far earlier than the earliest human sites. Human underground construction likely began with cave dwelling pre-historic people who wanted to expand their homes. The purpose of many ancient underground structures is a mystery, for instance erdstalls which are found across Europe. All ancient civilizations practiced some form of underground construction, with some also branching into rock-cut architecture. In early urban centers underground spaces served as burial places, provided protection against invaders, and enabled early public utilities.

The first known use of gunpowder in underground construction occurred in France in 1681. The invention of dynamite and steam and compressed air powered drills in the 18th century revolutionized the industry. The 19th century saw innovations in shield tunneling techniques which made underground construction in soil safer. As nations urbanized, the extent of underground urban construction increased significantly, with improved sewers, public water systems, subways, and underground commercial spaces all being required by expanding cities. In the late 20th and early 21st century, advances in automation and geotechnical engineering have allowed the ambition and scale of underground construction projects to increase.

Archeology in major cities often requires the use of underground construction techniques, as excavations must be made without disturbing existing buildings on the site. Underground museums have been created to preserve historical structures in-situ and without altering the often historically significant building built above. Archeological sites are also commonly discovered during underground construction.

== Safety and regulation ==
Underground construction has a number of unique risks and challenges, but it also shares many aspects with traditional construction and mining. Underground construction workers often work in low-light conditions, in dangerous spaces, and are at high risk of exposure to contaminants, fire, and explosions. In the United States, the Occupational Safety and Health Administration (OSHA) first adopted unique regulations for underground construction in 1971. OSHA regulates underground construction by companies and federal agencies, but does not regulate underground construction activities associated with mining. Underground construction is one of the most dangerous industries in the world, but it is becoming safer, especially as the most dangerous jobs are being automated.

== Tunnel construction ==
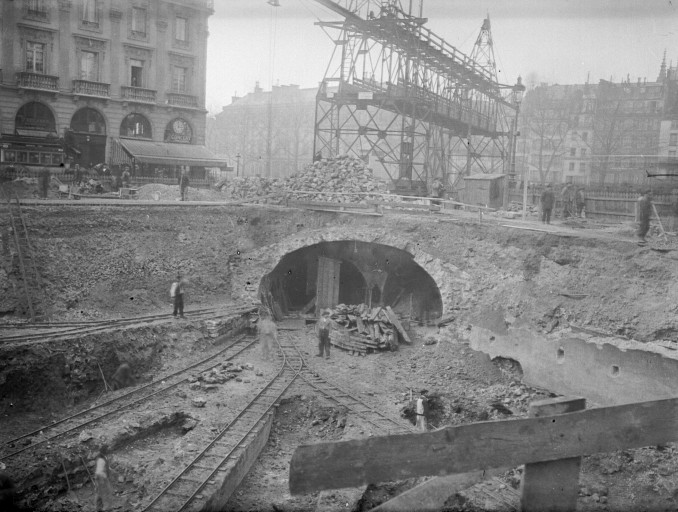
Cut-and-cover construction of the Paris Métro in France

Tunnels are the most common man-made subterranea. They have been constructed by various means since prehistory.

== Military construction ==
Historically a wide variety of fortifications were either underground or partially below grade. Modern underground military facilities (primarily designed to resist aerial attack) emerged during the second world war and the pre-war period. During the later years of WWII, Nazi Germany moved much of its military industry underground. The Nazis used prisoners of war and slave labor to build their underground structures and large numbers perished during construction.

The Cold War brought about two new underground structures, the nuclear powers built missile silos and the all world powers built leadership protection bunkers in response. Examples of the latter include the Cheyenne Mountain Complex, Metro-2, and the Underground City (Beijing).

== See also ==
- Underwater construction – Industrial construction in an underwater environment
- Planetary surface construction – Construction of structures on planetary surface
- Space architecture – Architecture of off-planet habitable structures
- Underground living – Living below the ground's surface
- Underground hangar – Military aircraft hangar
- Tunnel warfare – Use of tunnels and other underground cavities in wars
- Civil defense – Protection of citizens from disasters and military attack
- Underground city – Series of linked subterranean spaces
- Cargo Sous Terrain – Planned underground logistics system in Switzerland
- Chicago Tunnel Company – Narrow gauge underground railway
- The Boring Company – American infrastructure and tunneling company
- Geological Engineering
