= PLATIT =

PLATIT AG
- Type: Private (Swiss AG)
- Industry: industrial engineering and manufacturing
- Founded: 1993
- Headquarters: Selzach, Switzerland
- Key people: Dominik Blösch, CEO
- Products: surface technologies
- Parent: BCI Group
- Website: www.platit.com

Platit AG is a Swiss company that manufactures and markets coating equipment for the manufacturing cutting tool industry.

Platit was founded by the Blösch group in 1993 .The company’s headquarters are located in Selzach, Switzerland. Subsidiaries are located in the Chicago, USA, Shanghai, China, and the Czech Republic. There are 650 installations on 43 countries. Platit is wholly mainly owned by BCI Group, a Swiss conglomerate that focusses on products for the Swiss watch industry.

== Products ==
PVD coatings are typically applied to cutting tools – such as drills, hobs or endmills -, molds and dies, and machine components to extend their lifetime. Typical PVD coatings include Titanium nitride (TiN), TiCN, or TiAlN, AlCrN, Nanocomposites, TripleCoatings3, and QuadCoatings4.

Platit manufactures coating units using Cathodic arc and sputtering technology to deposit PVD coatings.

It is one of the technology leaders in physical vapor deposition coating technology.
