= Création Baumann =

- Type: AG
- Industry: Textiles
- Founded: 1886
- Headquarters: Langenthal, Switzerland,
- Key people: Philippe Baumann, CEO and proprietor
- Number of employees: 260
- Website: http://www.creationbaumann.com/index_en.html

Création Baumann is a Swiss textile enterprise with headquarters in Langenthal (canton Berne). It has nine subsidiaries across Europe, Asia, the USA und 40 agencies worldwide.

The independent family enterprise designs, manufactures and distributes textiles worldwide for interior furnishing, for both the contract sector and residential furnishing. Its hallmarks are contemporary fabrics for curtains, upholstery and wall coverings as well as systems and adhesive textiles. Création Baumann employs 260 members of staff.

== Company history ==
In 1886 Friedrich Baumann and Albert Brand founded the company «Brand & Baumann» for the manufacture and distribution of linen goods. The two entrepreneurs went their separate ways at the start of the 20th century. Friedrich Baumann set up his own business called «Baumann-Grütter», which was taken on by his sons Willy and Fritz in 1930. Willy was responsible for the finances, whilst Fritz looked after manufacture and distribution. Step by step they built up exports. After the Second World War, the enterprise was split into two: an upholstery fabric manufacturing plant and a linen weaving mill. Fritz Baumann took charge of the linen weaving mill, which later developed into the trademark «Création Baumann». In 1951, the enterprise, which meanwhile was also producing curtain fabrics, relocated to new buildings at the Bern-Zürich-Strasse in Langenthal, at which Création Baumann's headquarters are still today. The company achieved continuous growth and exports flourished. In 1976 the third generation took charge of the company, with Joerg Baumann. Création Baumann already numbered 200 employees. The trademark was promoted worldwide and in 1985 turnover reached the 40 million Swiss franc mark for the first time. Since 2000, the management has been under the stewardship of Philippe Baumann, the fourth generation Baumann, entrusted with the management of the company. In the last few years export accounted for between 73 and 75 percent of sales.

== Field of activity ==
Création Baumann unites design, production and distribution in Langenthal. The textile range consists of three sectors: textiles with the Création Baumann Line and the Living Line, Systems which includes panel curtains, vertical blinds and Roman blinds and adhesive textiles. It includes textiles with inherent special functions, such as the control of incoming light and sound absorption.

== Textile Innovations ==
In 2006 Création Baumann launched GECKO, a new development. GECKO is a self adhering, UV resistant textile, which, owing to a silicon coating, can be affixed to window glass through the use of adhesive power, from which it can be removed without a trace of residue and without loss of adhesion. The adhesive textile can be used anywhere where privacy, glare protection and temperature control are required and where architectural or style considerations preclude curtaining, blinds or panels.

The Silver&Steel collection, which was introduced in 2009, was also a textile technical innovation. A thin aluminium or steel layer, which is applied to the reverse of the fabric using ultra modern technical engineering, reduces the ingress of sun rays and incoming light through effective reflection, to create a soft light without glare, whilst simultaneously minimizing the ingress of heat. The coating achieves function values which are impossible to attain with conventional textiles.

If special properties are in demand for applications, such as in office buildings, museums or the health care sector, Création Baumann has a variety of textiles. The spectrum includes blackout fabrics, textiles for privacy and glare protection, flame retardant fabrics, fabrics which have been tested for harmful substances and textiles that offer acoustic solutions to direct and control sound.

== Sustainability ==
Environmental protection has long been a tradition at Création Baumann. As early as 1973 the enterprise was spearheading the Swiss textile industry with an expansion of its dye workshop that included a neutralisation plant. To this day, Création Baumann can achieve the prescribed norms for the processing of industrial effluents with the neutralization plant, without having to resort to any further chemical processes.

== Designers' Saturday ==
Création Baumann is initiator and founder of the Swiss design event Designers' Saturday, which has been held in Langenthal biannually since 1987. In 2010, the Designers' Saturday attracted almost 18'000 visitors to Langenthal.

== Literature / Sources ==
- Baumann, Jörg: In the weave - The World of Decorative Fabrics, Stories and Histories. Published by Creavis 2011. ISBN 978-3-00-033494-8
- Baumann, Jörg: Ein Schweizer Textilunternehmen im Wandel der Zeit – Von der Leinenweberei zu Création Baumann – Geschichte der ersten 100 Jahre. 1986.
- Brochure Création Baumann: Our contribution to sustainability.
