= Heinrich Ryffel =

Swiss industrialist and politician (1804–1880)

- Born: 12 February 1804; Stäfa, Switzerland
- Died: 4 September 1880 (aged 76); Wetzikon, Switzerland
- Occupations: Industrialist, politician
- Spouse: Johanna Magdalena Huber

Heinrich Ryffel (12 February 1804 – 4 September 1880) was a Swiss cotton manufacturer and politician from Stäfa.

== Biography ==
Ryffel was the son of Hans Rudolf, a home worker and innkeeper, and of Regula Köller. In 1828 he married Johanna Magdalena Huber, daughter of Johann Felix, a tanner and manufacturer. From the age of eight he worked in a factory at Stäfa, and later in Alsace and Basel. As an overseer in the spinning mill of his future father-in-law at Medikon (in the municipality of Wetzikon), he took over the business in 1829. He built a cotton-spinning mill at Glattfelden (1854–1855), which employed 200 people.

A co-founder of the secondary school of Wetzikon (1832), Ryffel was president of its school commission (1851–1872). He was a deputy in the Grand Council of Zürich (1846–1879). A convinced Radical, he campaigned in the 1850s for the construction of a railway line toward Wetzikon.

== Bibliography ==
- Bülach-Dielsdorfer Volksfreund, 15 and 22 September 1880
