= Manor (department store) =

Swiss department store chain

Manor AG

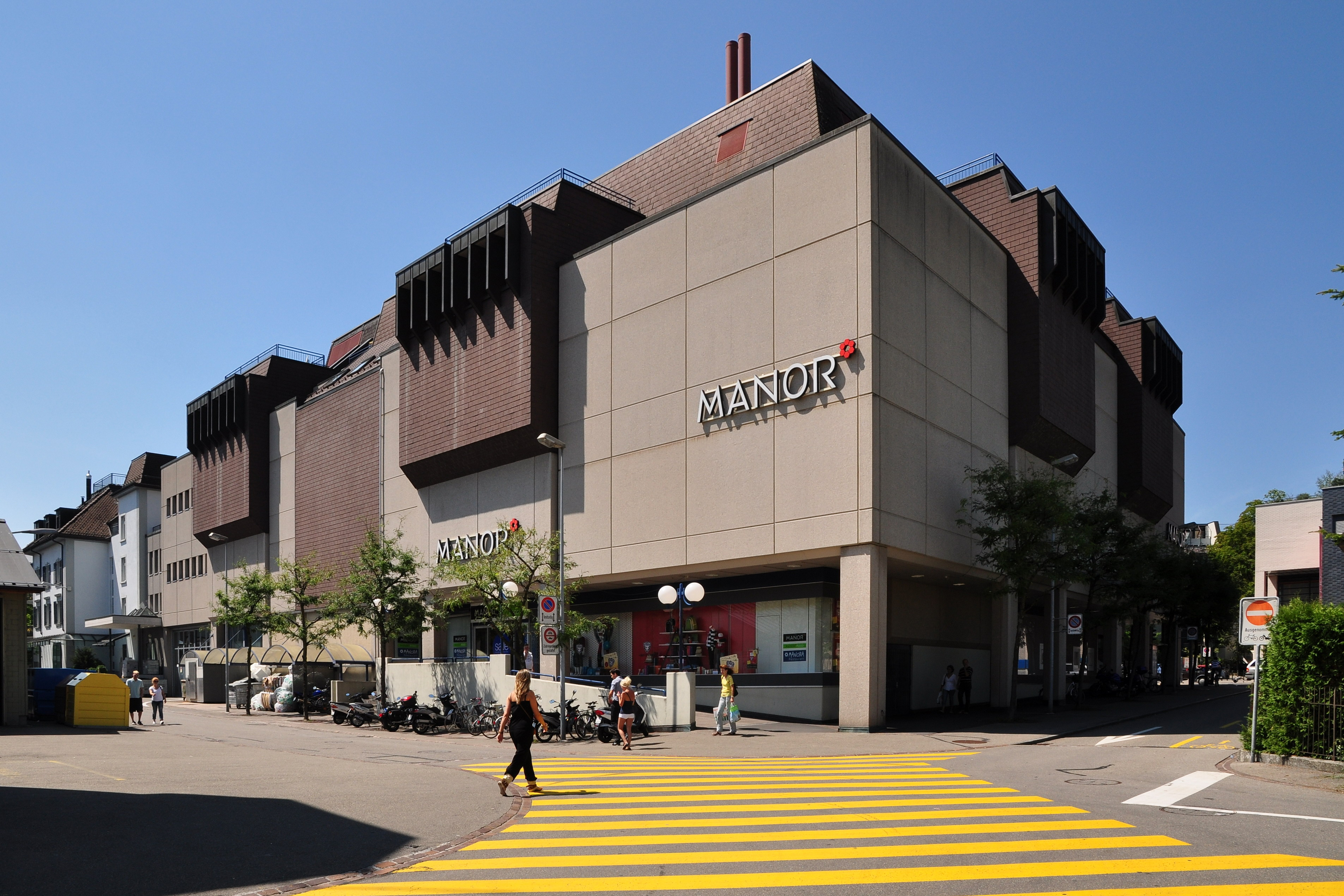
- Manor shopping mall in Rapperswil
- Type: Public
- Industry: Retailing
- Founded: 1902; 124 years ago, in Lucerne
- Headquarters: Basel
- Website: manor.ch

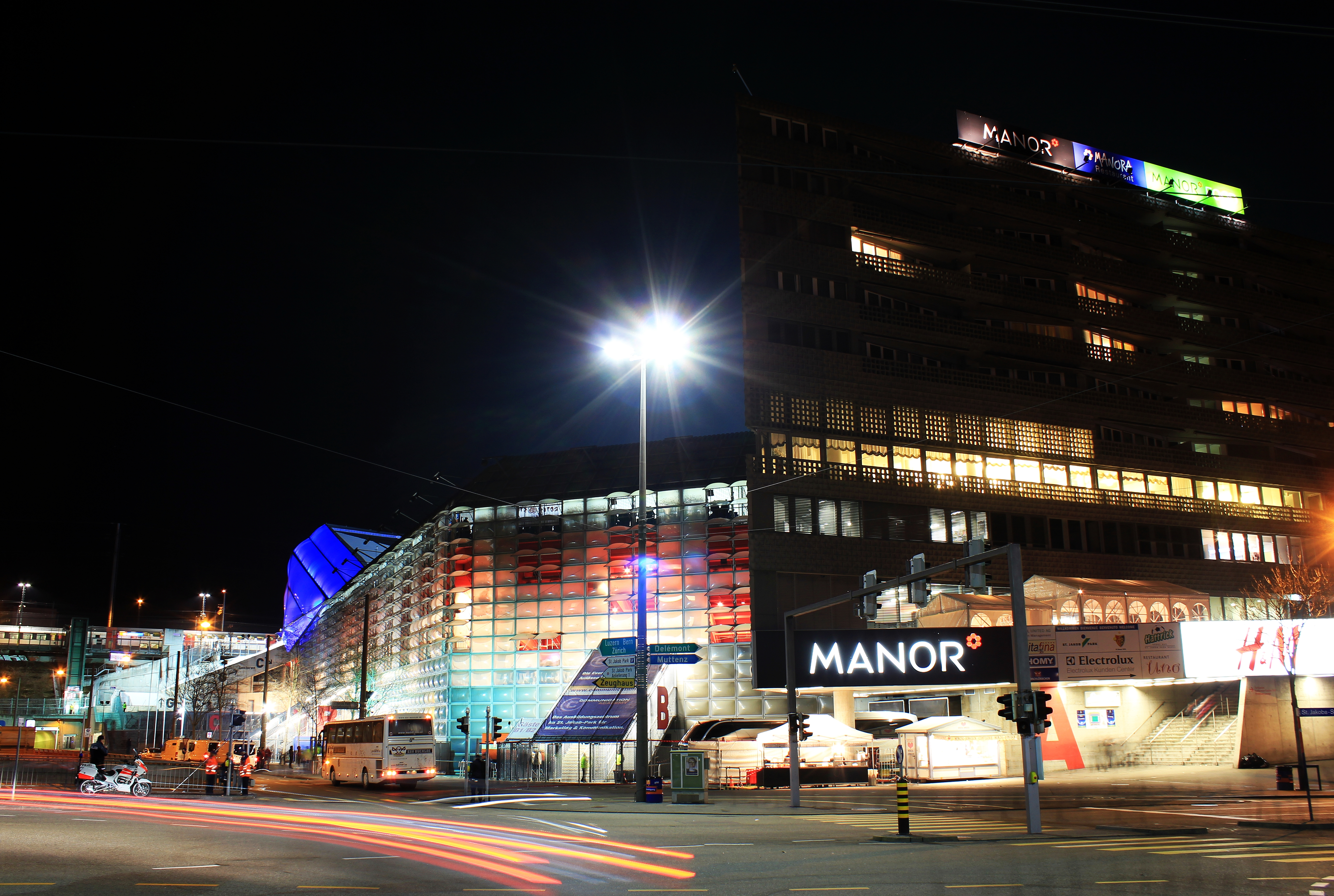
Manor in Basel's St. Jakob-Park.

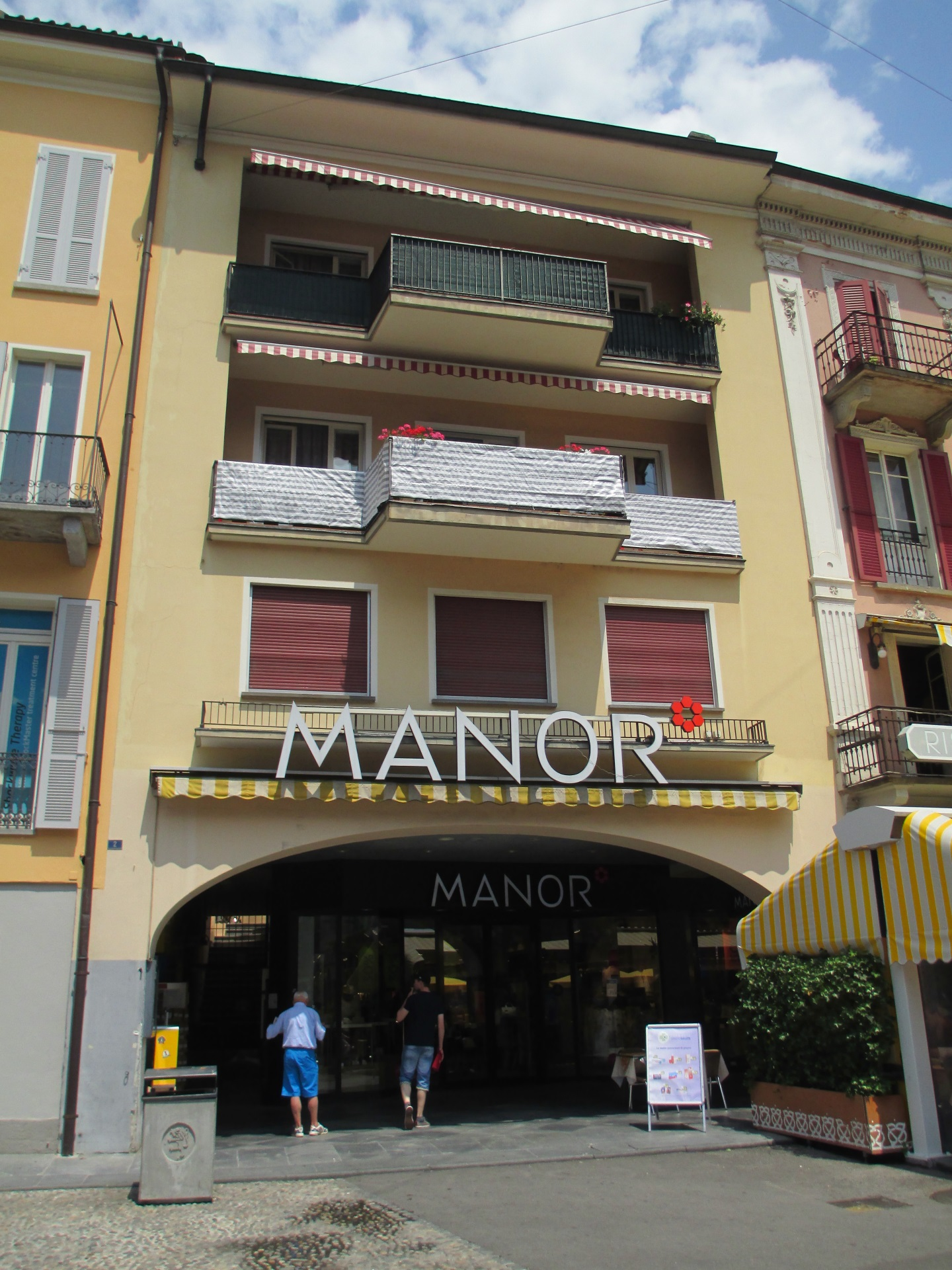
Manor in Locarno.

Manor AG is a Swiss department store chain with its headquarters in Basel. It is owned by Maus Frères of Geneva, and is Switzerland’s largest department-store chain. It generated total sales of CHF 3 billion in 2013. Manor has been a member of the International Association of Department Stores since 1968.

== Company history ==
Brothers Ernest and Henri Maus together with Léon Nordmann opened their first department store in Lucerne in 1902, under the “Léon Nordmann” name. The more familiar “Manor” – a combination of the founders’ Maus and Nordmann surnames – did not appear until a new corporate identity was adopted in about 1965.

All the company’s department stores in German-speaking Switzerland have borne the Manor name since 1994, and all the stores in the rest of the country have carried the name since September 2000.

In 2000, it acquired Innovazione, the leading retailer in Ticino. Although the Ticino-based company abandoned the Innovazione name, it retained an autonomous designation as Manor Sud SA.

== Locations ==
Manor's mainline stores are located in Basel, Geneva, Lausanne, Locarno, Lugano, Luzern and Zürich plus Aarau, Affoltern am Albis, Ascona, Bachenbülach, Baden, Balerna, Bellinzona, Biasca, Biel/Bienne, Bulle, Chavannes de Bogis, Chur, Delémont, Emmen, Frauenfeld, Fribourg, Haag, Heerbrugg, Hinwil, Ibach, Kreuzlingen, La Chaux-de-Fonds, Langenthal, Liestal, Marin-Epagnier, Monthey, Morges, Nyon, Payerne, Pfaffikon, Rapperswil, Rickenbach, S. Antonino, Sargans, Schaffhausen, Schattdorf, Schönbühl, Sierre, Sion, Solothrun, Spreitenbach, St Gallen, Thun, Vesenaz, Vevey, Vezia, Wattwil, Winterthur, Wohlen, Yverdon-les-bains, & Zug.

== See also ==
- List of Swiss companies
