= Kabelwerke Brugg =

Swiss cable and wire rope manufacturer

- Trade name: BRUGG Group AG
- Formerly: Otto Suhner & Co.
- Industry: Cables and wire ropes
- Founded: 1896
- Founder: Gottlieb Suhner
- Headquarters: Brugg, Switzerland
- Products: Wire ropes; cables; process control technology; pipe systems
- Revenue: about CHF 350 million (2000)
- Number of employees: 2,119 (2025)
- Website: brugg.com

Kabelwerke Brugg ("Brugg cable works"; French: Câbleries de Brugg) is a Swiss company based in Brugg. Founded in 1896 as a branch of the firm of Gottlieb Suhner of Herisau, it took the name Kabelwerke Brugg in 1908 and mainly produced wire ropes and plastic cables. From 1973 it was increasingly organized as an internationally oriented group, the Brugg Group.

== History ==
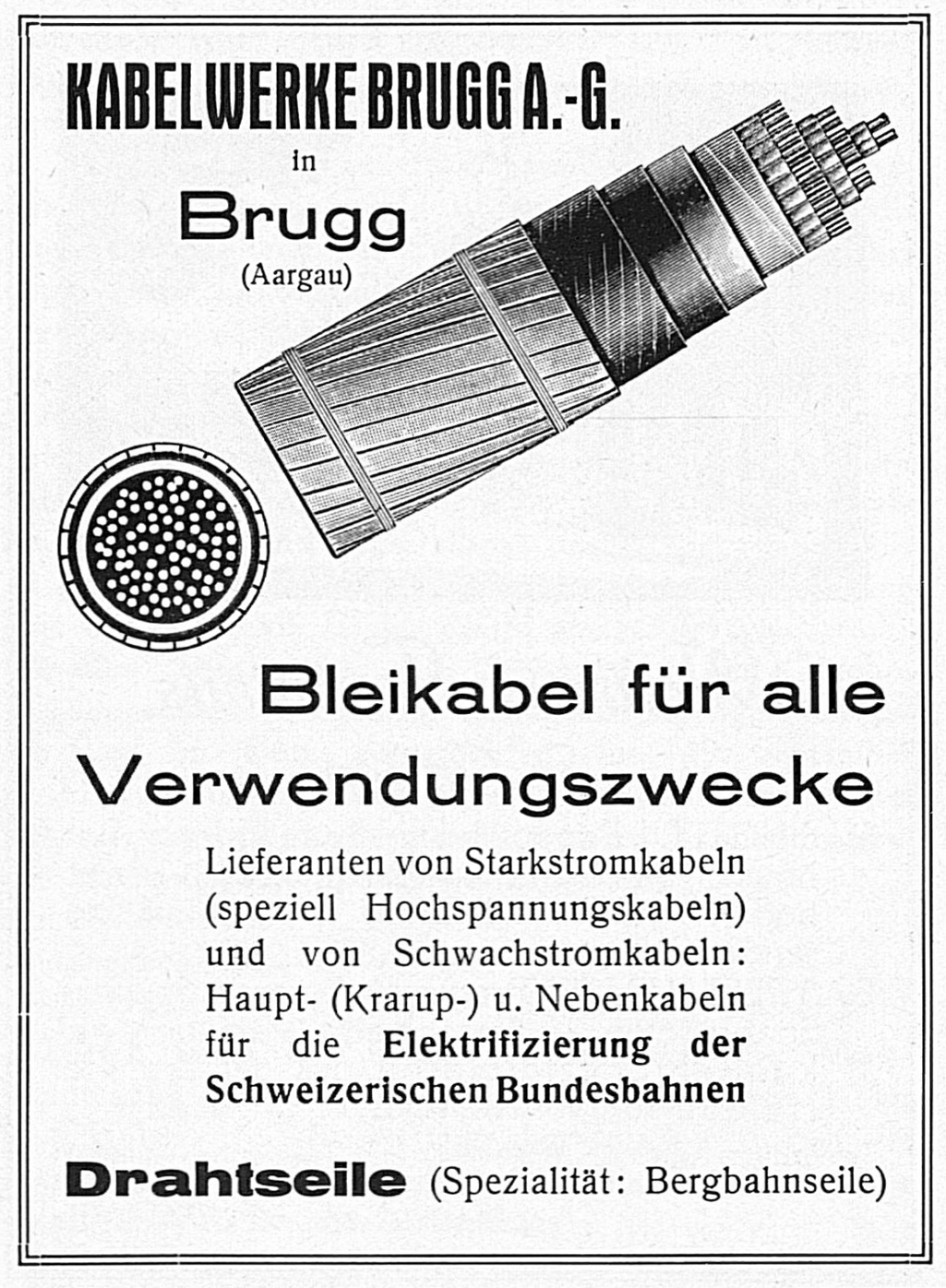
A 1927 advertisement of the Kabelwerke Brugg for lead-sheathed cables and wire ropes

The company was founded in 1896 near the railway station in Brugg as a branch of the sole proprietorship of Gottlieb Suhner in Herisau. From 1906, under the management of the founder's son, the firm was called Otto Suhner & Co. After financial difficulties it was converted into the Kabelwerke Brugg in 1908. Under its director Walter Dübi, the workforce grew from 60 in 1911 to 500 in 1945. The company mainly produced wire ropes and plastic cables, among other things for power distribution, telecommunications, and mountain railways.

With the purchase of subsidiaries from 1973, the Kabelwerke Brugg was increasingly organized as a group with an international orientation, the Brugg Group. Process control technology and pipe systems were added as new product groups. In 1991 the business divisions were converted into legally independent companies. In 2000 the group had sales of about 350 million francs and 1,300 employees. The majority shareholders were the Merker, Suhner, and Wartmann families.

== Bibliography ==
- Brugg. Tradition – Vision, 1996
- Brugg erleben, 2 vols., 2005
