= Trisa =

Swiss personal hygiene company

Trisa AG
- Company type: Privately held
- Founded: 1887; 139 years ago
- Headquarters: Triengen, Switzerland
- Area served: Worldwide
- Key people: Adrian Pfenniger
- Products: Personal care products
- Revenue: US$ 219.90 million (2019)
- Number of employees: 1,147
- Website: http://www.trisa.ch/home.html

The TRISA Group (TRI from Triengen and SA from Société Anonyme plc) is a Swiss consumer products company, focused on producing personal hygiene products like oral care, hair care and body care. It was founded in 1887 by six citizens of the municipality of Triengen, in the district of Sursee within the Swiss canton of Lucerne. Trisa employs approximately 1,150 people and generated sales of 232.1 million Swiss francs in 2015. It operates in 80 markets around the world and the company is owned by the fourth generation of Pfenniger family, Andrian Pfenniger and Phillip Pfenniger.

== History ==
On 25 August 1887, six citizens of Triengen found Bürstenfabrik AG Triengen with a share capital of CHF 40,000. A local businessman, Xavier Pfenniger-Vonnarburg becomes the commercial manager. By the start of the 20th century, the company finishes building a brush woods production plant and starts production of toothbrushes, subsequently followed by hairbrushes, cloth brushes, hat brushes, moustache brushes and other equipment for gardening and farming activities.

In 1941, Ernst Pfenniger-Häfliger, the second generation of Pfenniger, joins the Bürstenfabrik AG Triengen and takes over as the managing director. Under his leadership, the company replaces its hand drawn production with Hydraulic Tufting machinery and thermoplastic products are introduced. In 1948, Bürstenfabrik AG Triengen changes its name to TRISA (which stems from TRI from Triengen and SA from Société Anonyme plc).

In 1962, the company celebrated its 75th anniversary, which was followed by the launch of a new factory and a new equally represented Board of Directors being introduced.

In 1967, the third generation of Pfenniger, Ernst Pfenniger-Unternährer joins TRISA as the new managing director.

In 1982, TRISA opened a central warehouse in Kehr and a new division, Trisa Electronics AG, is founded in 1987. That same year, the company closed down its sawmills and wood business, marking the end of its wooden products. In 1989, the company purchases its local competitors, The Walther Brand and Bürstenfabrik Ebnat-Kappel AG. In the same year, the fourth generation of Pfenniger, Andrian Pfenniger joins the company, subsequently followed by his brother Phillip Pfenniger in 1994, both maintaining a senior management position since then.

In 1996, the company opened a local distributor in Bulgaria, TRISA Bulgaria GmbH. By the end of the century, the company also opened another two divisions, TRISA Accessories AG and TRISONIC AG.

The company celebrated its 125th anniversary in 2012.

== Operations ==
Trisa Group is a holding company that offers products under the Trisa brand and its other subsidiaries.

Trisa produces products for hair care and personal care, such as skin cleansing equipment. The subsidiaries of Trisa also produces electronic appliances such as vacuum cleaners, household appliances (such as raclette ovens, personal scales, irons, etc.) under the Trisa Electronics brand. 65 percent of its products are exported abroad, with the export of the toothbrush being around 95 percent.

=== Subsidiaries ===
- TRISA Electronics AG (electrical appliances)
- TRISA Accessories AG (hair and fashion jewellery)
- TRISONIC AG (electric mouth care products)
- EBNAT AG (brush manufacturer)
- TRISA Bulgaria GmbH (international distributor in Bulgaria)

== See also ==
- Procter & Gamble
- Nestlé
