= Gétaz-Miauton =

Swiss building materials supplier

- Formerly: Gétaz Romang
- Industry: Building materials
- Founder: Samuel Gétaz
- Headquarters: Blonay – Saint-Légier, Switzerland
- Products: Building materials, products, and appliances
- Revenue: more than CHF 343 million (2004)
- Number of employees: 1,403 (2004)
- Website: getaz-miauton.ch

Gétaz-Miauton (formerly Gétaz Romang) is a Swiss company supplying building materials, products, and appliances for the construction industry. It was founded in Vevey by Samuel Gétaz, who moved the business to Lausanne in 1898 and went into partnership with Emile Romang. Within a few decades it became the leading company in its sector in Switzerland.

== History ==
Gétaz Romang was founded in Vevey by Samuel Gétaz, who had taken over a building materials transport business, already active in 1856, from a relative, Charles Genand. In 1898 Samuel Gétaz moved his business to Lausanne and went into partnership with Emile Romang. Sanitary ware and tiling departments were set up in 1900, and in the 1910s two depots were opened, in Montreux and Châtel-Saint-Denis. In 1916 Alfred Ecoffey became a partner in the company, which within a few decades became the leader of its sector in Switzerland.

The company bought the Barraud brickworks in Bussigny in 1953, and in the 1970s it opened cement factories in Aigle and Conthey. In 1980 Gétaz Romang owned eleven distribution centers in French-speaking Switzerland as well as stakes in many companies. Restructured as early as 1974, the company came through the years of crisis, and in the 1990s it absorbed the Miauton group, the leading steel company in French-speaking Switzerland. In 2004 Gétaz Romang employed 1,403 people and had sales of more than 343 million francs. By December 2013 the company had been renamed Gétaz-Miauton SA.

== Bibliography ==
- Gétaz Romang, 1856–1981, [1981]
- J.-J. Baatard, "Gétaz Romang SA", in Reflets: bulletin mensuel de la BCV, 1989, no. 7–8, 16–19
