= Säuberlin & Pfeiffer =

Swiss packaging and printing company

- Packaging label of Säuberlin & Pfeiffer, around 1910
- Trade name: Autajon Packaging Säuberlin & Pfeiffer
- Industry: Printing; Packaging
- Founded: 1896
- Founders: Albert Säuberlin; Georges Pfeiffer
- Headquarters: Châtel-Saint-Denis, Switzerland
- Products: Folding cartons; shoulder boxes; calendars
- Number of employees: 140 (2002)
- Parent: Autajon (from 2002)
- Website: autajon.com

Säuberlin & Pfeiffer is a Swiss printing and packaging company founded in 1896 in Vevey by Albert Säuberlin and Georges Pfeiffer. It was bought by the French Autajon group in 2002 and moved its seat to Châtel-Saint-Denis in 2005.

== History ==
Sign of the former Säuberlin & Pfeiffer printing works on the rue du Lac in Vevey

Säuberlin & Pfeiffer was founded in Vevey in 1896 by Albert Säuberlin and Georges Pfeiffer. From the start it published books and printed chocolate packaging, among other things. It became a joint-stock company (société anonyme) in 1912 and soon gained an international clientele. The Säuberlin & Pfeiffer Editions Suisses, created in 1917, became independent in 1925. From the Second World War onward, the company concentrated its activities. In the 1960s the automation of its carton production allowed it to consolidate its dominant position in the sector.

Between 1974 and 1982 the company gradually took over the Klausfelder publishing house (Messager boiteux and Feuille d'Avis de Vevey), and in 1984 it acquired the Novos publishing house, known in particular for its calendars. In 2002 it was bought by the French Autajon group. It had 400 employees in 1915–1916 and 140 in 2002. In 2005 the seat of Säuberlin & Pfeiffer SA was moved from Vevey to Châtel-Saint-Denis.

== Bibliography ==
- Säuberlin & Pfeiffer, 1996

=== Archives ===
- Archives cantonales vaudoises, Chavannes-près-Renens, fonds Jeanne-Henriette Pfeiffer-Monnerat
