= Atlanship =

Swiss shipping company

Atlanship SA
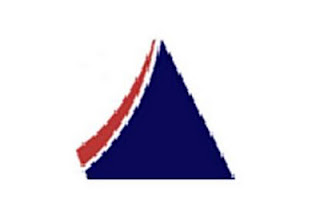
- Industry: Shipping
- Founded: 1982; 44 years ago
- Headquarters: La Tour-de-Peilz, Switzerland
- Area served: Worldwide
- Services: Freight transportation
- Website: www.atlanship.eu

Atlanship SA, founded in 1982, is a Swiss shipping company that specializes in transporting refrigerated fresh and concentrated orange juice. It is headquartered in Lausanne, Switzerland with a representative office in Rotterdam. They provide full ship management services.

== The company today ==
Atlanship operational areas include South America, Europe, the United States, Japan and Korea.

In 2011, the Croatian shipyard Brodosplit, in the Adriatic port of Split, delivered the biggest ever orange juice carrier to Atlanship SA. The Orange Star is 190 metres long and 32 wide, and has a capacity of 35,750 tonnes. This giant juice tanker is the replacement vessel for the old Orange Star which was in service from 1975 to 2010, and then sold for scrap in India.

== The fleet ==
Name	Type	IMO	Year
Orange Blossom	Juice tanker	IMO 8407931	1984, sold in 2015
Bebedouro	Juice tanker	IMO 8503773	1986, sold in 2013
Orange Wave	Juice tanker	IMO 9057123	1993
Orange Sky	Juice tanker	IMO 9228370	2003
Orange Sun	Juice tanker	IMO 9342580	2007
Orange Star	Juice tanker	IMO 9564384	2011
Orange Ocean	Juice tanker	IMO 9675391	2014
Orange Blossom 2	Juice tanker	IMO 9675406	2014
