= Huber + Suhner =

Swiss connectivity components manufacturer

HUBER+SUHNER AG

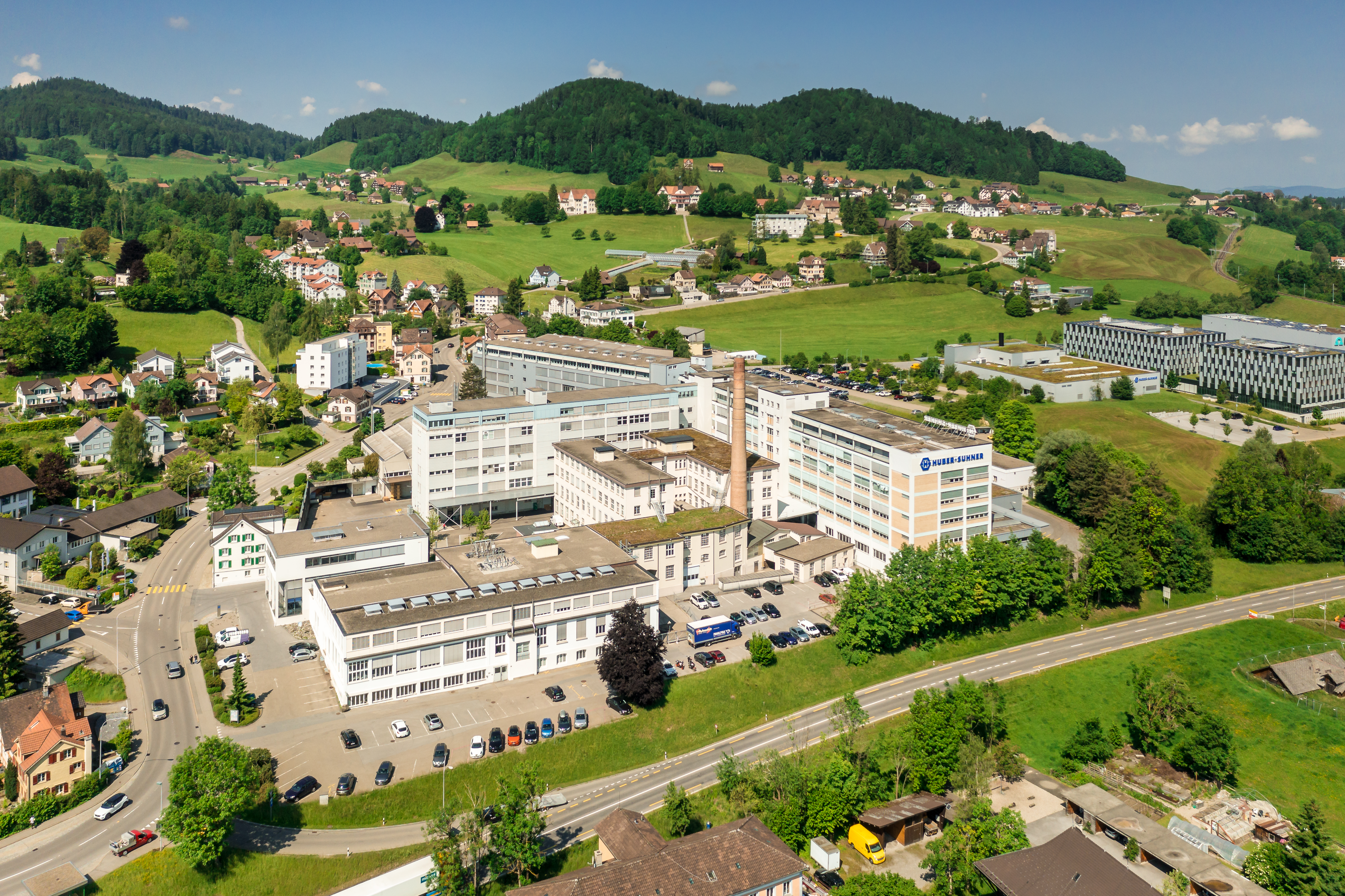
- Huber+Suhner in Herisau (2021)
- Type: Aktiengesellschaft
- Traded as: SIX:HUBN
- ISIN: CH0030380734
- Industry: Electrical and optical connectivity
- Founded: 1969 (merger of R. & E. Huber and Suhner & Co.)
- Headquarters: Herisau and Pfäffikon, Switzerland,
- Area served: Worldwide
- Products: Radio frequency, fiber optic, and low frequency connectivity components and systems
- Revenue: SFr 893.9 million (2024)
- Operating income: SFr 86.6 million (2024)
- Number of employees: ~4,000 (2024)
- Website: www.hubersuhner.com

HUBER+SUHNER AG is a Swiss company, based in Herisau and Pfäffikon, that designs and manufactures components and systems for electrical and optical connectivity. It is listed on the SIX Swiss Exchange.

== History ==
The company arose in 1969 from the merger of two companies: Suhner & Co. AG, founded at Herisau in 1864 by Gottlieb Suhner, and R. & E. Huber AG, founded at Pfäffikon in 1882 by Rudolf Huber. Both companies, initially working for the textile industry, turned to the manufacture of insulated wires and cables for the electrical industry, Huber in 1885 and Suhner in 1892, later supplementing this activity with the production of technical rubber and plastic articles.

From 1975 HUBER+SUHNER specialized in high-value-added niche products. Initially producing simple components, it became a systems supplier in the 1990s. The company, at first active nationally, then became a global group—with 2,751 employees in 2005, of whom 55% were in Switzerland—holding a dominant position in the field of electrical and optical connectivity. This development was reflected in the rising share of exports (10% in 1975, 51% in 1995), as well as in the acquisition of the Champlain Cable Corporation in the United States (1988, sold again in 2003) and the establishment of factories abroad from 1995.

The reorientation in 2001–2002 toward the core competencies of high-frequency, fiber-optic, and cable technologies, together with a balanced diversification into the communication, transport, and industrial markets, led to the sale of several departments and, from 2004 to 2006, to record profits.

Since 2021 the company has been organized around three market segments: Industry, Communication, and Transportation, addressed through its three technologies of radio frequency, fiber optics, and low frequency. In 2024 it employed around 4,000 people in some 20 countries and reported net sales of 893.9 million francs and operating profit (EBIT) of 86.6 million francs.

== Bibliography ==
- H. R. Schmid, 75 Jahre R. & E. Huber Aktiengesellschaft, schweizerische Kabel-, Draht- und Gummiwerke, 1957
- P. Holderegger, Unternehmer im Appenzellerland, 1992, 394–398
