= Swiss Jewel =

Swiss jewel bearing manufacturer

- Trade name: SJC Advanced Ceramics
- Industry: Precision components
- Founded: 1907
- Founder: Constantin Mojonny
- Headquarters: Tenero-Contra, Switzerland
- Products: Synthetic jewels; high-precision products
- Number of employees: 120 (2010)
- Website: swiss-jewel.com

Swiss Jewel (Swiss Jewel Co SA) is a Swiss manufacturer of synthetic jewels and other high-precision products, based in Tenero-Contra. It was opened in Locarno in 1907 as a branch of C. Mojonny fils & Co, a maker of jewels for watchmaking and precision instruments founded in Yverdon in 1883, and separated from its parent company in 1924.

== History ==
In 1907, Constantin Mojonny opened a branch of C. Mojonny fils & Co in Locarno. The parent company, a factory of jewels for watchmaking and precision instruments, had been founded in Yverdon in 1883. In 1911 the business took the name Swiss Jewel Co SA, and in 1924 it separated from the parent company. At first it had workshops scattered across several villages of the region, but after production was mechanized in the 1920s and 1930s it concentrated its activities in Locarno.

In the second half of the 20th century Swiss Jewel became the largest industrial firm in the Locarno region, and the Foery family from Zug became a partner in it. After moving its plants to Tenero-Contra in 1990, the company merged with Sifo Holding SA in 1997. In 2010 Swiss Jewel employed 120 people in the manufacture and sale of synthetic jewels and other high-precision products.

== Bibliography ==
- I. Schneiderfranken, Le industrie nel cantone Ticino, 1937, 106–108
