= Alchimie Forever =

Swiss skincare brand

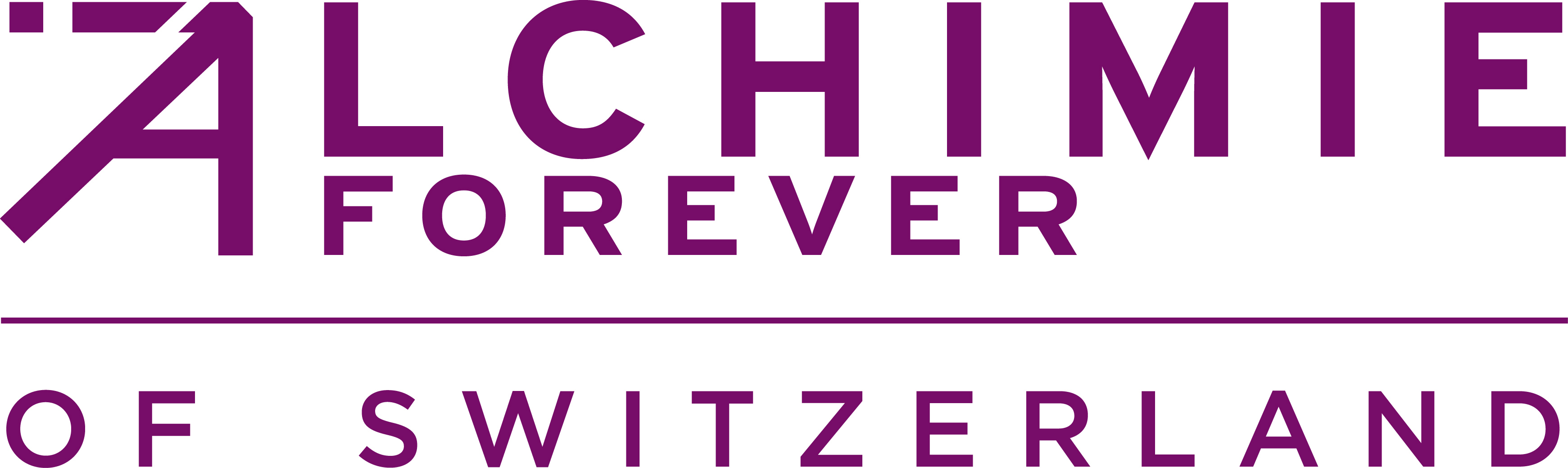
- Type: Private
- Industry: Skin care
- Founded: Geneva, Switzerland; Washington, D.C.
- Founder: Luigi Polla; Barbara Polla
- Key people: Ada Polla
- Products: Skin care line
- Website: alchimie-forever.com

Alchimie Forever is an anti-aging skin care line by Swiss dermatologist Dr. Luigi Polla.

== History ==
Upon completing his studies, Polla opened a dermatology practice in Geneva, Switzerland in 1986 and was the first dermatologist to offer pulsed dye laser technology to treat children with Port-wine stains and hemangiomas.

Polla's eldest daughter, Ada Polla, worked the practice's front desk during those years. She recalls her father's motivation to find products that would assist the skin in healing from these painful treatments. When he could not find products to calm the skin post-procedure, he decided to create them himself. The products were originally created at a nearby compounding pharmacy, and the first product Polla formulated was the Kantic Brightening Moisture Mask. Because the children's mothers also loved the products, that led to the development of additional products, which became the Alchimie Forever brand.

The products sold well, and the Pollas decided to expand distribution beyond Geneva. Ada, started Alchimie Forever LLC, in Washington, D.C., to distribute Alchimie Forever products in the United States.

Alchimie Forever is distributed throughout UK, Switzerland, France, and the United States. The products are distributed online, in independent beauty boutiques, pharmacies, drugstores, and by skincare professionals. In an interview with PETA Prime, Polla says the product line is vegan and cruelty free. Ada Polla is the president and CEO of Alchimie Forever.

== Reaction ==
Alchimie Forever products have appeared in numerous fashion magazines, including Shape Elle, Vogue, Glamour, Redbook, and Men's Journal.

The Best Drugstore Skin Treatments According to Pros, People, ' Ashley Scott, a skin therapist at Heyday in N.Y.C., says that this pink-tinted brightening mask looks radiant when you apply it: "Wear it on Zoom calls!" Bonus: It also comes in travel size for an on-the-go glow.
