= Repower (company) =

Company

Repower AG
- Type: Aktiengesellschaft (Company limited by shares)
- Industry: Energy
- Founded: 1904
- Headquarters: Poschiavo, Switzerland
- Area served: Europe
- Key people: Michael Roth (CEO); Barbara Janom Steiner (Chairman of the Board of Directors)
- Products: Electricity generation, transmission and distribution, natural gas distribution
- Revenue: CHF 3.36 billion (2023)
- Number of employees: 745 (2026)
- Website: www.repower.com

Repower (until May 2010 Rätia Energie AG) is an international energy utility with its operational headquarters in Poschiavo (Canton Graubünden, Switzerland). The company's history goes back more than 100 years, with the foundation in 1904 of Kraftwerke Brusio AG. Its key markets include Switzerland and Italy. The group operates along the entire value chain, from generation and trading to sales.

The Repower Group employs 745 people, 276 of whom in Italy (plus 353 sales agents) and 469 in Switzerland (plus 29 apprentices).

== History ==
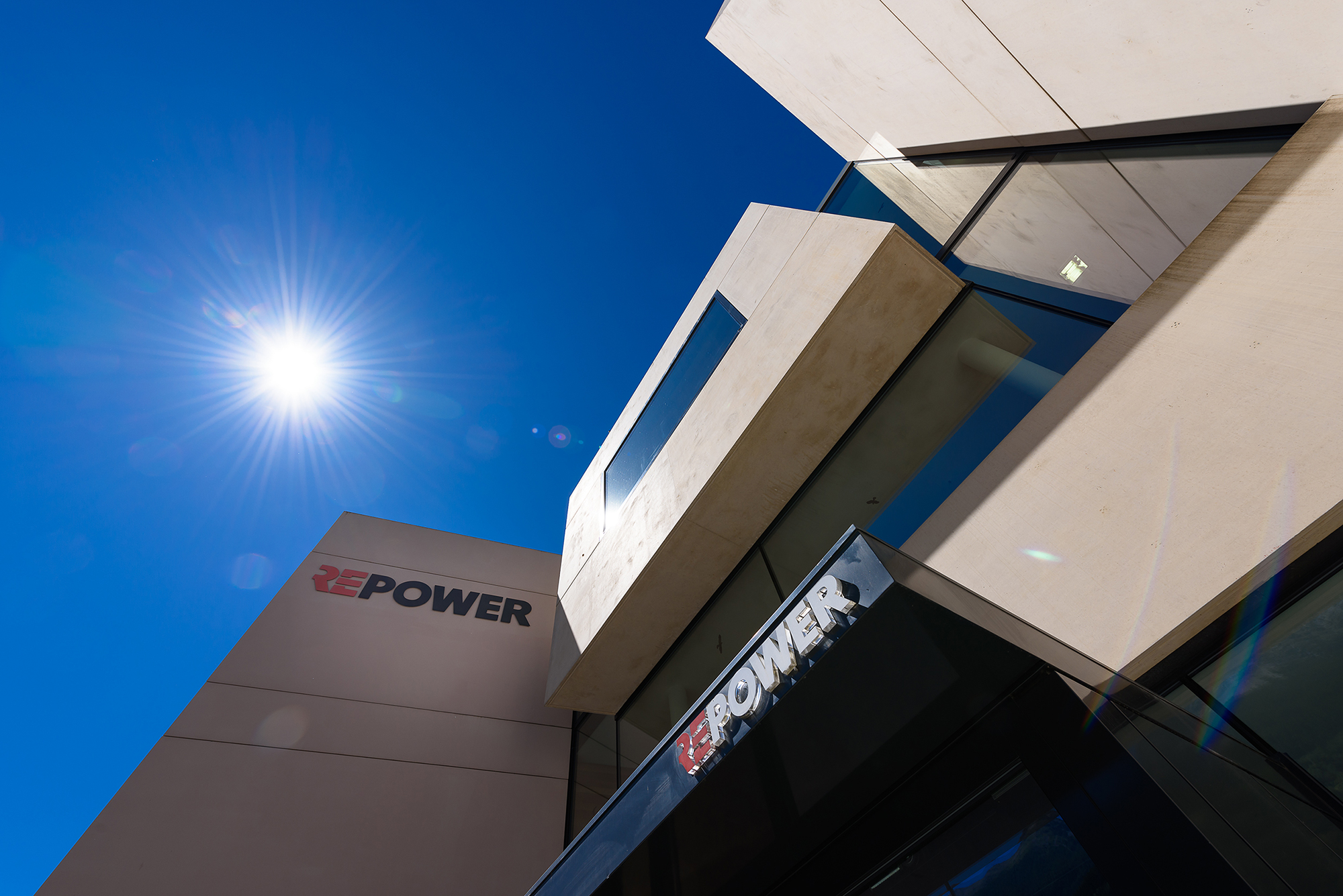
Repower AG headquarters in Poschiavo (Grisons)

For more than 100 years, Repower has been one of the largest providers of electricity in Switzerland. Founded in 1904 as Kraftwerke Brusio AG, the same year the company started construction of its first power plant − at the time the largest high-pressure hydropower installation in Europe − in Campocologno in the Poschiavo region of Canton Graubünden, Switzerland. Proximity to the Italian border precipitated the company's involvement in international projects and business activities. In 2000, Kraftwerke Brusio AG (Poschiavo), AG Bündner Kraftwerke (Klosters) and Rhätische Werke für Elektrizität AG (Thusis) merged to create the Rätia Energie AG group, which was subsequently joined by aurax ag (Ilanz) in 2004. In 2002 the group embarked on business in Italy. In 2010, Rätia Energie AG was renamed Repower AG.

== Operations ==
Repower's primary activities are production, trading and sale of electricity and natural gas across Switzerland and Italy. The company produces electricity from a number of energy sources including hydroelectric power, wind power, solar power and thermal power.

In 2024 Repower generated (including energy from subsidiaries and participations) a total of around 2.1 TWh of electricity:

- Hydroelectric energy 59%
- Wind energy 8%
- Solar energy 2%
- Thermal power 20%
- Nuclear power 11%

== Shareholder structure ==
The company's shareholders are:

- Elektrizitätswerke des Kantons Zürich 38.49%
- Canton Graubünden 27.00%
- (UBS-)Clean Energy Infrastructure KmGK (CEIS 3/UBS-CEIS 2) 23.04%
- Free float 11.47%

== Financial highlights ==
Repower prepares its accounts in Swiss francs. Its 2025 results were announced on 8 April 2025.

2025 financial highlights	CHF million
Total operating revenue	1.986
Group profit	101
Operating profit (EBIT)	133
Balance sheet total	2.084
Equity	1.230

== Offices ==
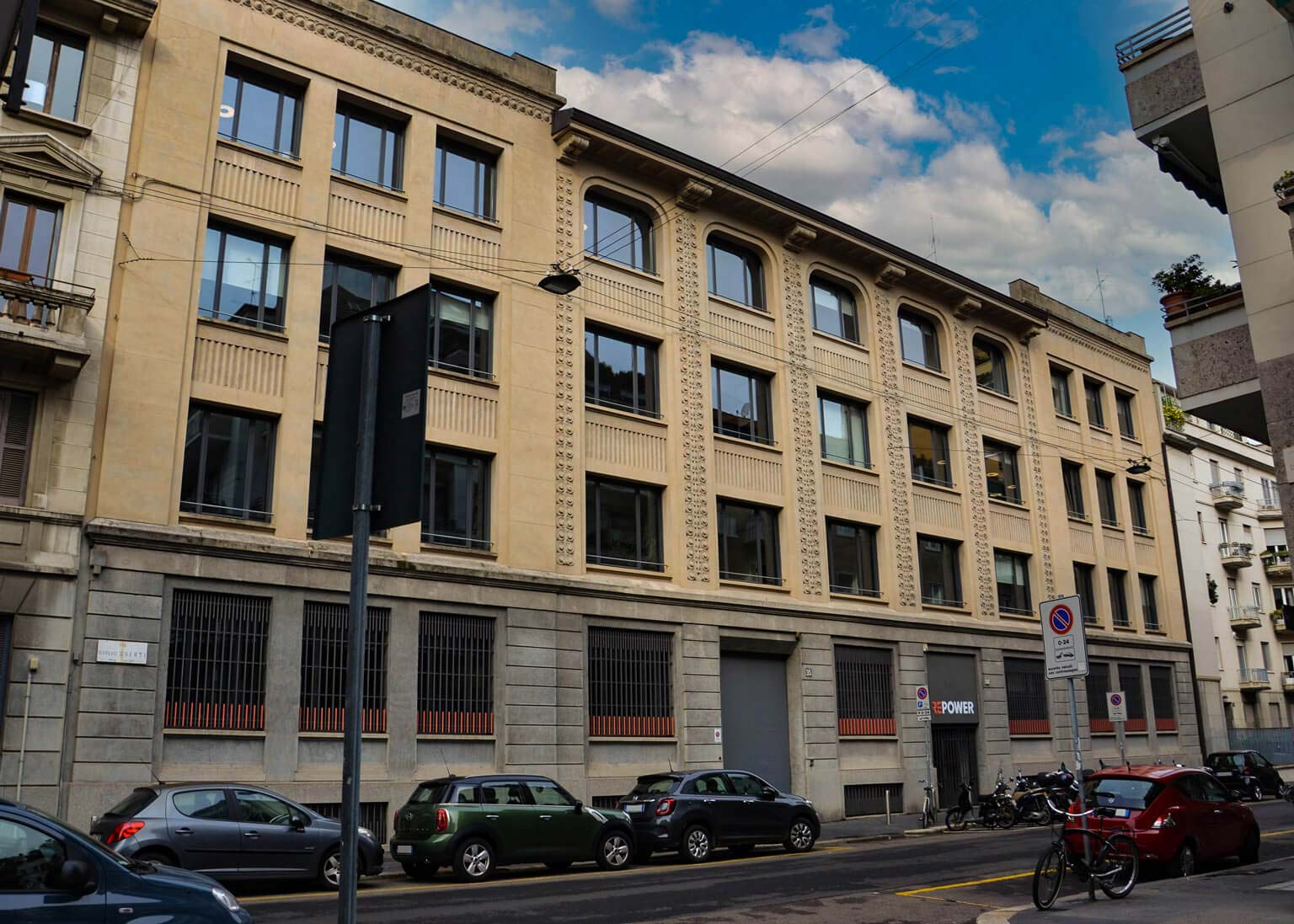
Repower Italia headquarters in Milan

In Switzerland the group has offices in Bever, Küblis, Ilanz, Landquart, Poschiavo, Grono and Zurich. In Italy it operates out of an office in Milan.

== Executive board ==
The executive board comprises the following members:

- Michael Roth, CEO of Repower Group
- Lorenzo Trezzini, Head of Finance, CFO
- Fabio Bocchiola, Head of Italy
- Dario Castagnoli, Head of Trading, Origination & IT
