= Tesa SA =

Swiss company

Tesa SA is a Swiss company in precision measurement products. It was set up in 1941 and is currently headquartered in Renens, Switzerland. It is a division of Hexagon AB, a Swedish multinational corporation.

In 1967 it became part of the USA Brown & Sharpe group, with which it had already worked together for roughly 10 years.

From the eighties on, Tesa acquired a number of companies and their brands: Roch Rolle, Etalon (1981), Merced Ltd., Roch France, Mauser, Compac Geneve, Cary (2000), Sud Messures (2003).

In 2001, the Brown & Sharpe group is bought by the Swedish Hexagon AB group. However, the manufacturing group of Brown & Sharpe was not bought. All precision measurement products of Brown & Sharpe were already manufactured under the Tesa brand, and production (by Tesa) could be done elsewhere.

== IMICRO ==
In 1950 they introduced the IMICRO, a 3-contact bore gauge with an innovative design, which they digitalised in 1998.

The IMICRO has a cone with a spiral to drive the 3 measurement pins outwards by rotation. This gives a higher precision than a conventional cone.
