= AutoForm =

AutoForm Engineering GmbH
- Company type: Private
- Industry: Software development
- Founded: 1995; 31 years ago
- Headquarters: Wilen bei Wollerau, Switzerland
- Key people: Olivier Leteurtre (CEO); Dr. Waldemar Kubli (Founder and CPO)
- Products: Software
- Number of employees: >400 (2019)
- Website: www.autoform.com

AutoForm Engineering GmbH located in Pfäffikon SZ Switzerland is a Swiss software developer. AutoForm’s software forms a platform for the engineering, evaluation and improvement of the sheet metal forming and BiW assembly processes. In 2009, the company had a 50-60% industry market share.

== History ==
In 1995, the company emerged as a spin-off from the Swiss Federal Institute of Technology in Zurich, which itself began with a dissertation written by founder Waldemar Kubli in 1990. Subsequently, the company created subsidiaries in Europe, North and South America, and Asia. In 2016 AutoForm was acquired by Astorg and in 2021 Carlyle acquired AutoForm from Astorg.

== Products ==
The AutoForm products address various areas of application along the Sheet Metal Forming and BiW Process Chains, including product development, early planning, process & tooling, and tryout & production. In 2008 of the largest 20 automotive OEMs and most of their suppliers were using AutoForm.

== Industry and research partnerships ==
AutoForm is involved in joint development projects for sheet metal forming and BiW assembly covering several industries. This includes work with automobile manufacturers such as Audi, BMW, Mercedes-Benz Group, and PSA Group; tooling suppliers such as Magna International and Faurecia; material suppliers including ArcelorMittal, and ThyssenKrupp Steel; and universities including ETH Zurich and Twente University.
