= Lutsk =

City and administrative center of Volyn Oblast, Ukraine

Lutsk Луцьк
- City
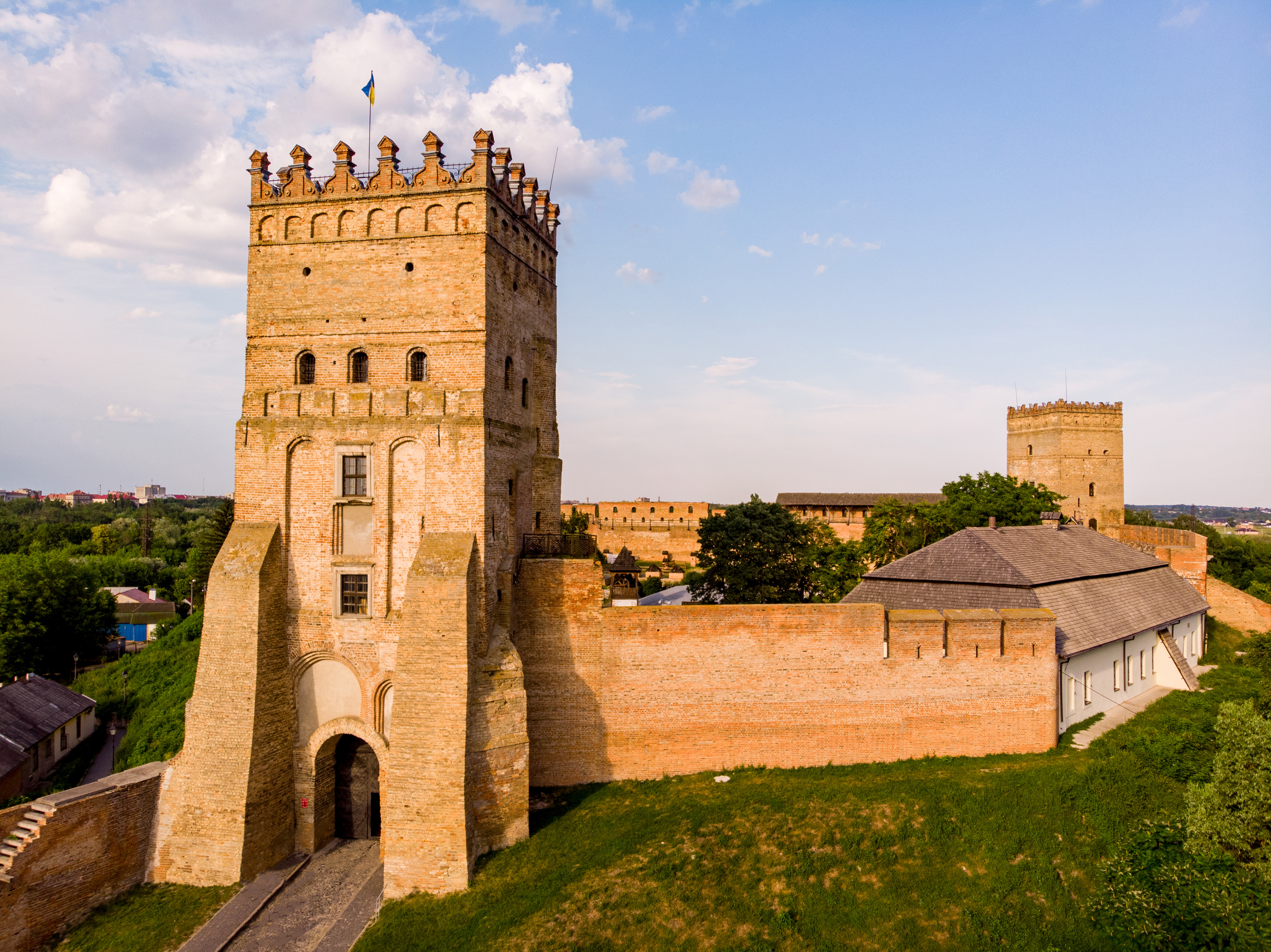
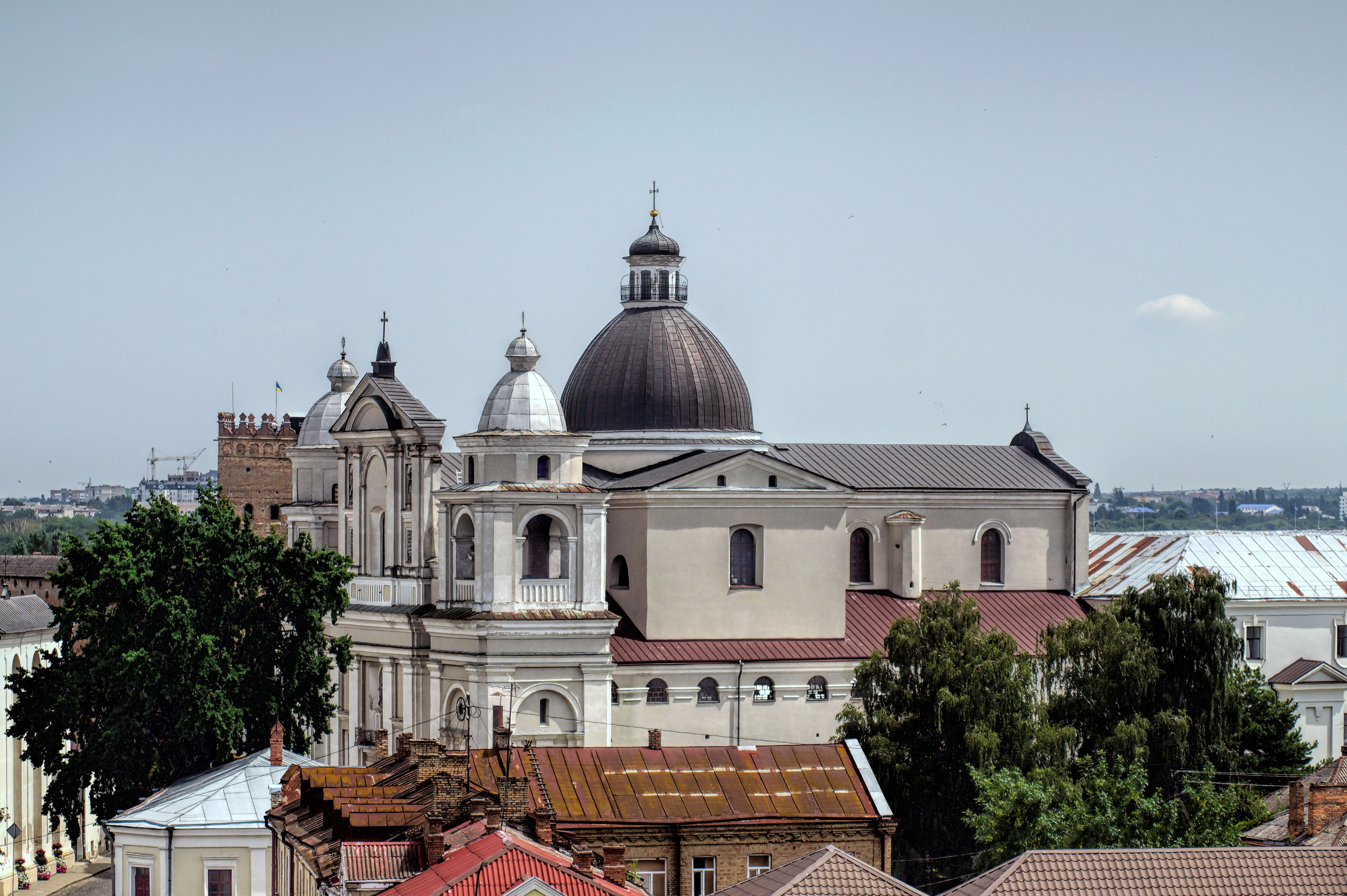
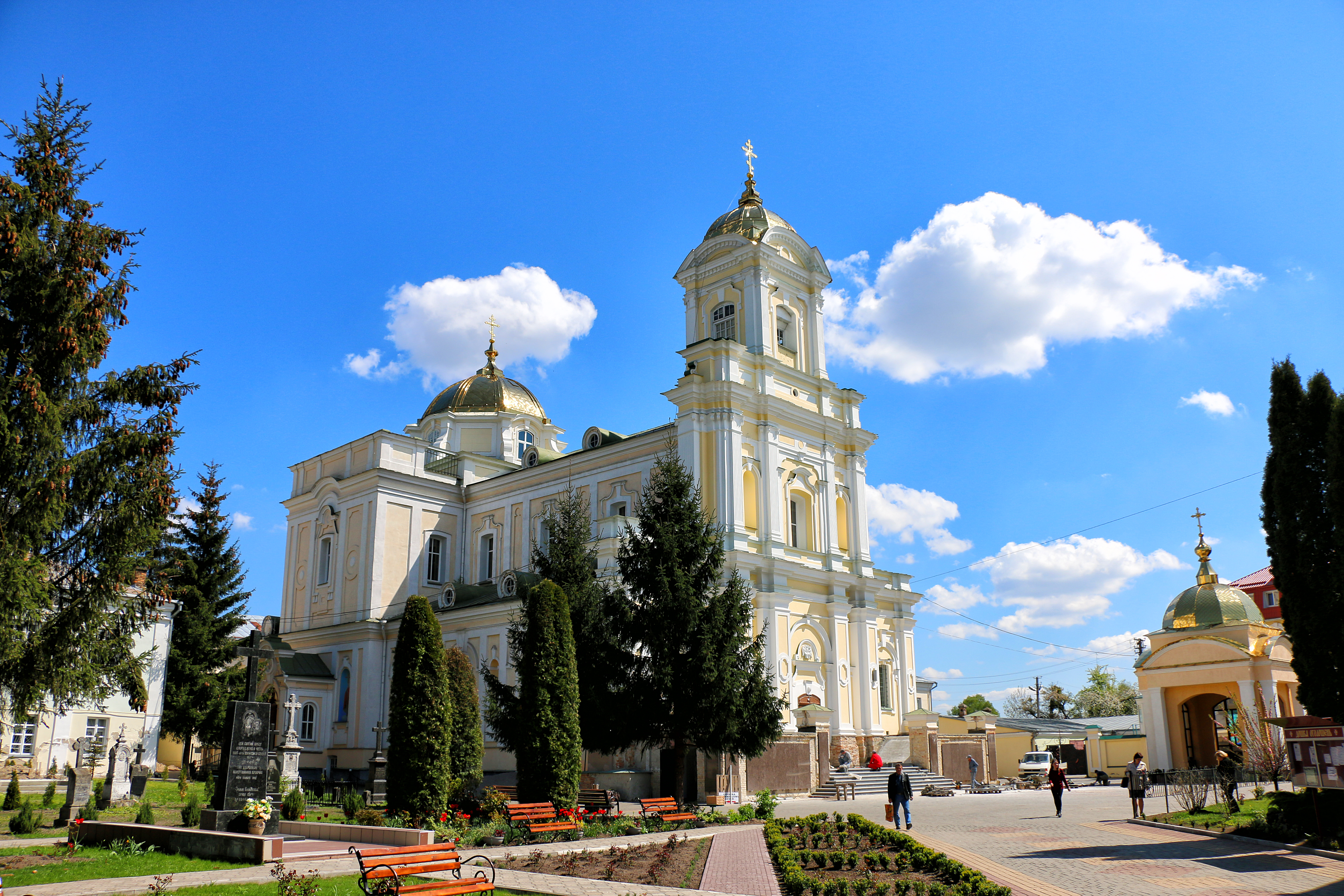
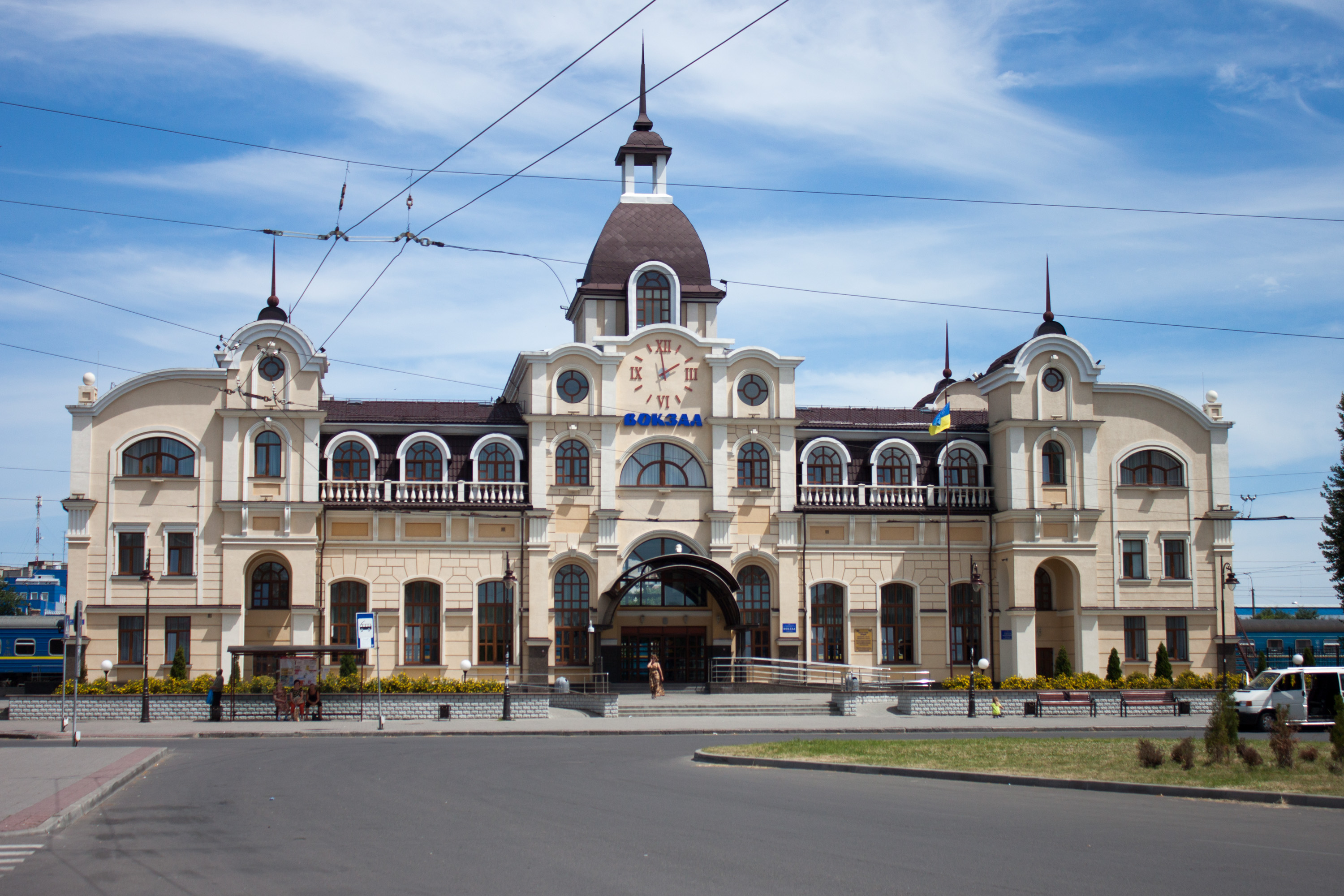
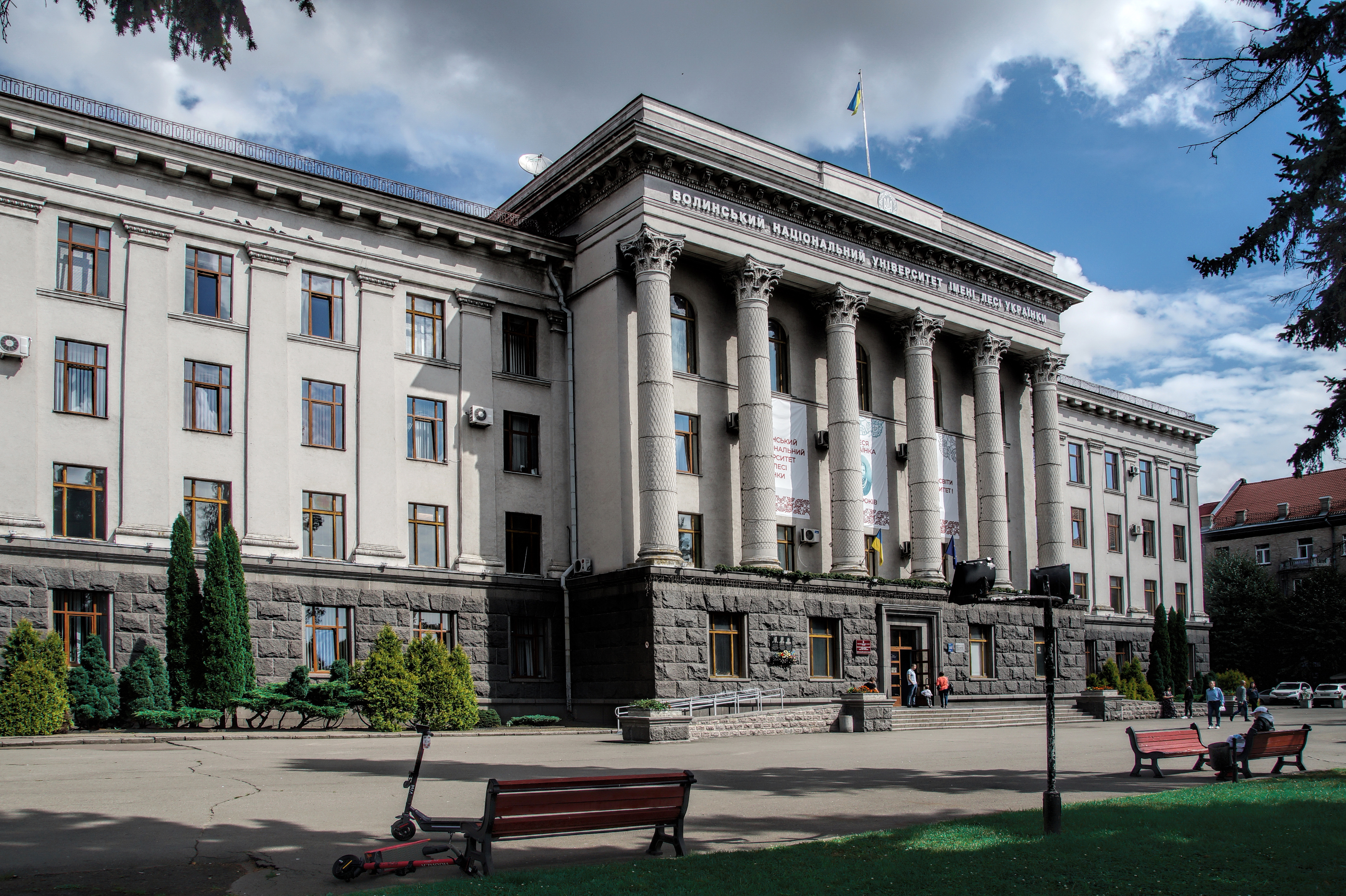
- Lubart's Castle with its main entrance through the Lubart's Tower Catholic Cathedral Orthodox Cathedral Train station Volyn National University

- Flag Coat of arms

- Location of Lutsk Lutsk (Ukraine)
- Coordinates: 50°45′00″N 25°20′09″E
- Country: Ukraine
- Oblast: Volyn Oblast
- Raion: Lutsk Raion
- Hromada: Lutsk urban hromada
- First mentioned: 1085
- City rights: 1432

Government
  - Mayor: Andriy Razumovsky (acting)

Area
  - Total: 72.3 km^{2} (27.9 sq mi)
- Elevation: 174 m (571 ft)

Population (2022)
  - Total: 220,986
  - Density: 4,830/km^{2} (12,500/sq mi)
- Time zone: UTC+2 (EET)
  - Summer (DST): UTC+3 (EEST)
- Postal code: 43000
- Area code: +380 332
- Sister cities: Lublin
- Website: lutskrada.gov.ua/en

Lutsk (Ukrainian: Луцьк, IPA: [lutsʲk]; see below for other names) is a city on the Styr River in northwestern Ukraine. It is the administrative center of Volyn Oblast and the administrative center of Lutsk Raion within the oblast. Lutsk has a population of 220,986 (2022 estimate).

First mentioned in 1085, Lutsk is a city with almost a thousand years of history. It has served as an administrative, cultural and religious center in Volhynia. The city contains several landmarks in various styles, including Renaissance, Baroque and Neoclassical, the best known of them being the medieval Lubart's Castle.

== Names and etymology ==
Lutsk is an ancient Slavic town, mentioned in the Hypatian Chronicle as Luchesk in the records of 1085. The etymology of the name is unclear. There are three hypotheses: the name may have been derived from the Old Slavic word luka (an arc or bend in a river), or the name may have originated from Luka, the chieftain of the Dulebs (an ancient Slavic tribe living in this area). The name may also have been created based on Luchanii (Luchans), an ancient branch of the tribe mentioned above.

The city of Lutsk is also historically known by different names in other languages – Polish: Łuck, IPA: [wutsk]; Yiddish: לוצק ,לויצק, romanized: Loytsk, Loutsk; as well as a number of other names.

== History ==
According to legends, Luchesk dates from the 7th century. The first known reference to the town was made in 1085, in the Hypatian Codex. In the 11th century, along with the region of Volhynia, the town was contested by the Kyivan Rus' and Poland. The town served as the capital of a separate principality from 1154. After 1225, it came under the rule of the Principality of Volhynia with the capital in Volodymyr, later part of Galicia-Volhynia. The town grew around a wooden stronghold built by a local branch of the Rurik Dynasty. At certain times, the location functioned as the capital of the principality, but the town did not become an important centre of commerce or culture.

=== Grand Duchy of Lithuania ===
In 1240, Mongols seized and looted the nearby town but left the castle unharmed. In 1321, George, son of Lev, the last prospective heir of Halych-Volynia, died in a battle with the forces of Gediminas, Grand Duke of Lithuania, and Lithuanian forces seized the castle. In 1349, the forces of King Casimir III of Poland captured the town, then Lithuania soon retook it, but it remained contested by Lithuania and Poland until 1382.

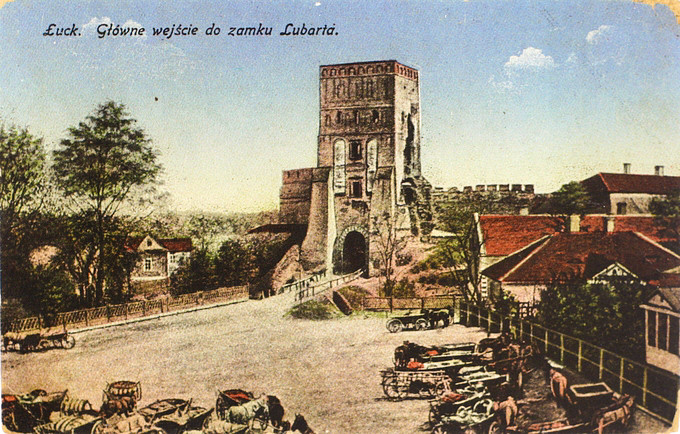
Lubart's Castle on a postcard from 1916

The town began to prosper during the period of Lithuanian rule. Prince Lubart (died 1384), son of Gediminas, who ruled Lutsk starting from 1340, erected Lubart's Castle as part of his fortification programme. From 1385, the city was part of the Polish-Lithuanian union, yet it remained an object of Lithuanian-Polish rivalry. Polish King Władysław II Jagiełło appointed Polish starosts, brought in Dominican monks, and staffed the Catholic bishopric, intending to connect it to the Polish Archdiocese of Lwów, while Lithuanian Duke Vytautas the Great sought to diminish Polish influence and develop the city to become Lithuania's second capital after Vilnius. Vytautas the Great invited colonists (mostly Jews, Tatars, and Crimean Karaites). In 1427, he transferred the Catholic bishopric from Volodymyr to Luchesk. Vytautas the Great was the last monarch to use the title of "Duke of Volhynia" and to reside in Lubart's Castle.

The town grew rapidly, and by the end of the 15th century, it had 19 Orthodox and two Catholic churches. It was the seat of two Christian bishops, one Catholic and one Orthodox. Because of that, the town was sometimes nicknamed "the Volhynian Rome." The cross symbol of Lutsk features the highest Lithuanian Presidential award, the Order of Vytautas the Great.

In 1429, Lutsk was the meeting place selected for a conference of monarchs hosted by Władysław II Jagiełło, Sophia of Halshany, and Vytautas the Great to deal with the Tatar threat. Those invited to attend included Sigismund, King of Hungary and Bohemia; Grand Duke Vasili II of Russia; Eric of Pomerania, king of Denmark, Norway and Sweden; the Grand Master of the Livonian Order Zisse von Rutenberg; the Duke of Szczecin Casimir V; Dan II, the Hospodar of Wallachia; and Prince-electors of most of the countries of the Holy Roman Empire. Moreover, at the end of this 1429 congress, Sigismund, King of Hungary and Bohemia, offered the Lithuanian Grand Duke Vytautas the Great to be coronated as the King of Lithuania and this way to restore the Kingdom of Lithuania.

=== Kingdom of Poland ===
In 1432, Volhynia became a fief of the Crown of the Kingdom of Poland and Lutsk became the seat of the governors, and later the Marshalls of the Land of Volhynia. That same year, the city was granted Magdeburg rights by King Władysław II Jagiełło. Between 1440 and 1453, the city once again served as capital of the appanage Principality of Volhynia under Svitrigaila. It was one of the minor centers of Armenians in Poland, with an Armenian church. In 1497, Alexander Jagiellon confirmed the city's old privileges. In 1569, Volhynia was fully incorporated into the Polish kingdom and the town became the capital of both the Łuck powiat and Volhynian Voivodeship in the Lesser Poland Province. After the Union of Lublin, the local Orthodox bishop converted to Eastern Catholicism. A Jesuit college was established in Lutsk. The Lutsk Brotherhood of the Holy Cross, founded in 1617, contributed to the foundation of an Orthodox school in 1621.

The city continued to prosper as an important economic centre of the region. By the mid-17th century, Łuck had approximately 50,000 inhabitants and was one of the largest towns in the area. During the Khmelnytsky uprising, the town was seized by the forces of colonel Kolodko. Up to 4,000 people were slaughtered, approximately 35,000 fled, and the city was looted and partially burnt. It never fully recovered. In 1781, the city was struck by a fire which destroyed 440 houses, both cathedrals, and several other churches. In 1788, Łuck was the 25th largest city of the Polish–Lithuanian Commonwealth. The city embraced the Constitution of 3 May 1791.

=== Russian Empire ===
In 1795, as a result of the Third Partition of Poland, the Russian Empire annexed Lutsk. The Voivodeship was liquidated and the town lost its significance as the capital of the province (which was moved to Zhytomyr), becoming a centre of one of the counties. After the November Uprising (1830–1831), efforts increased to remove Polish influence. Polish schools were closed in 1831 and Catholic monasteries were seized in 1840–1853. Russian became the dominant language in official circles, though the Ukrainian population continued to speak Ukrainian, the Polish population spoke Polish, and the Jewish population spoke Yiddish (only in private circles). The Greek Catholic Churches were turned into Orthodox Christian ones, which led to the self-liquidation of the Uniates. In 1845, another great fire struck the city, resulting in further depopulation. By 1864 only around 5,000 inhabitants lived in Lutsk.

In 1850, three major forts were built around Lutsk, and the town became a small fortress called Mikhailogorod. Neglected under Russian rule, by the late 19th century, the city lost its leading economic position in Volhynia to Rivne, Kovel and Zdolbuniv. As of 1897 Lutsk had 14,800 inhabitants, 79% of them Jews. By 1912 the city's population had risen to 26,600.

=== First World War and Ukrainian War of Independence ===
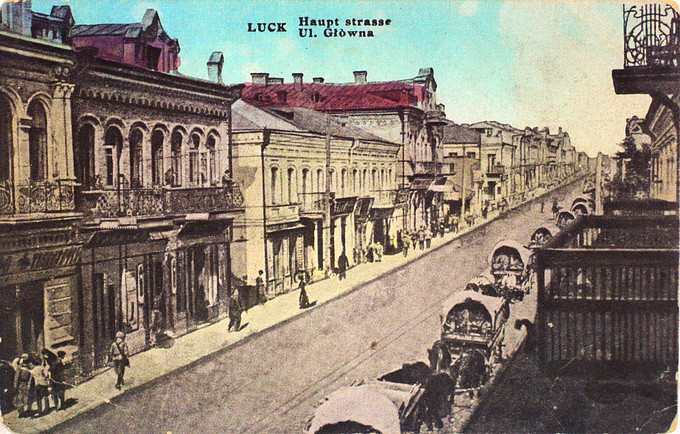
Postcard from the 1910s

During the First World War, the town was seized by Austria-Hungary on 29 August 1915. The town sustained a small amount of damage. During more than a year of Austro-Hungarian occupation, Lutsk became an important military centre with the headquarters of the IV Army under Archduke Josef Ferdinand stationed there. A plague of epidemic typhus decimated the city's inhabitants.

On 4 June 1916, four Russian armies under general Aleksei Brusilov started what later became known as the Brusilov Offensive. After up to three days of heavy artillery barrage, the Battle of Lutsk began. On 7 June 1916, the Russian forces reconquered the city.

Between 1917 and 1919, Lutsk was part of the Ukrainian People's Republic and the Ukrainian State. After the signing of the Treaty of Brest-Litovsk, the city was seized by Germany on 7 February 1918. On 22 February 1918, the town was transferred by the withdrawing German army to the forces loyal to Symon Petlura.

=== Second Polish Republic ===
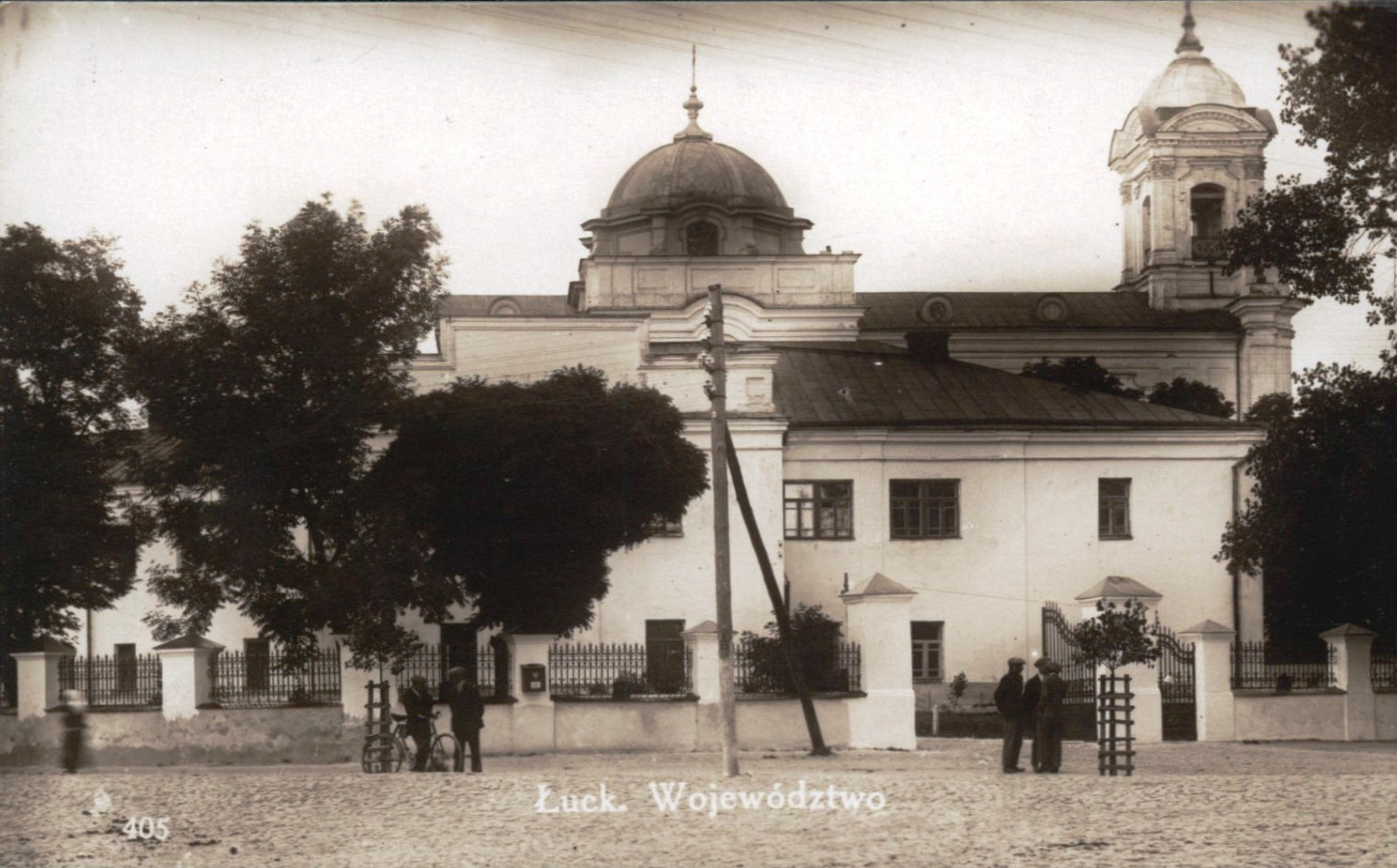
Office of the Wołyń Voivodeship in interwar Poland

During the Polish-Ukrainian War, on 16 May 1919, Lutsk was taken over by the forces of Poland's Blue Army after a heavy battle with the Kholm division of the Ukrainian People's Army. The city was devastated and largely depopulated. It witnessed the Soviet offensive of 1920 and was taken on 12 July 1920. It was recaptured by Poland's 45th Rifles regiment and field artillery on 15 September 1920. According to American sociologist Alexander Gella "the Polish victory [over the Red Army] had gained twenty years of independence not only for Poland but at least for an entire central part of Europe. Łuck was designated by the newly-reborn nation of Poland as the capital of the Wołyń Voivodeship.

The population of Lutsk grew from 21,200 in 1921 to 35,600 in 1931. The city was connected by railroad to Lviv (then Lwów) and Przemyśl. Several brand new factories were built both in Łuck and on its outskirts, producing farming equipment, wood, and leather products, among other consumer goods. New mills and breweries opened. An orphanage was built, and a large new bursary. The first high school was soon inaugurated. In 1937, an airport was established in Łuck with an area of 69 hectares (170 acres).

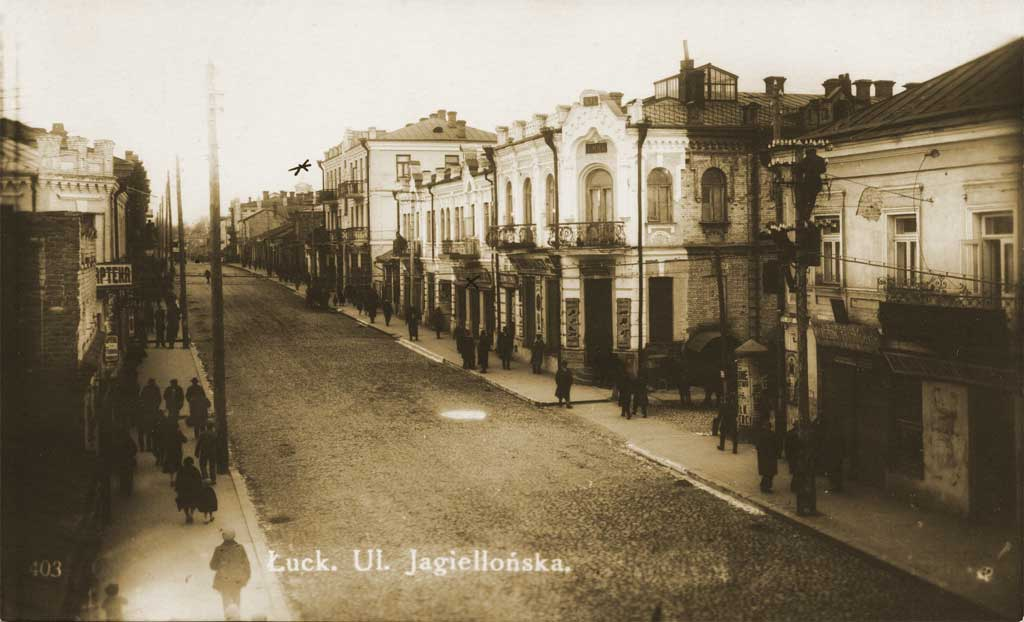
Jagiellońska Street in the interbellum (now Lesya Ukrainka street)

Under Polish rule during the 1920s and 1930s, Lutsk served as the main centre of the Ukrainian community in Western Volhynia. A branch of Prosvita functioned in the city between 1918 and 1932, when it was liquidated by Polish authorities, followed by the Peter Mohyla society. A private gymnasium, a theatre, and several cultural and religious organizations were organized by local Ukrainians, and the city became a centre of Ukrainian publishing.

The 13th Kresowy Light Artillery Regiment was stationed in the city, together with the Łuck National Defense (Poland) Battalion. In 1938, construction of a large modern radio transmitter began in the city (see Polish Radio Łuck). As of 1 January 1939, Łuck had 39,000 inhabitants (including approximately 17,500 Jews and 13,500 Poles). The powiat formed around the town had 316,970 inhabitants, including 59% Ukrainians, 19.5% Poles, 14% Jews, and approximately 23,000 Czechs and Germans.

=== World War II ===
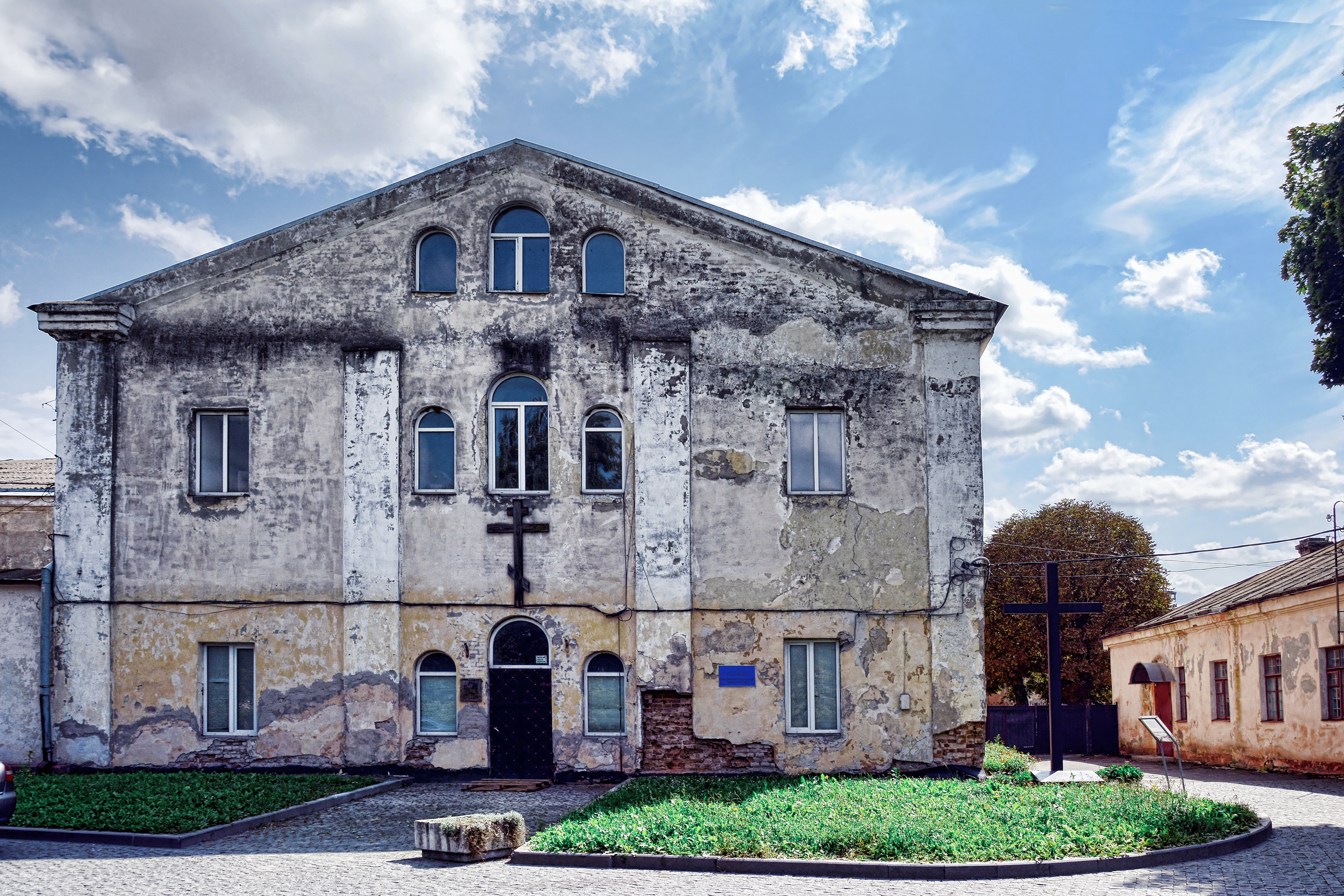
Site of the NKVD prisoner massacre of 1941

On Thursday 7 September 1939, at about 5 pm, the Polish government, which had left Warsaw the day before, arrived at Łuck. German intelligence quickly found out about it, and the city was twice bombed by the Luftwaffe, on 11 and 14 September. After panzer units of the Wehrmacht had crossed the Bug river, on 14 September, the government of Poland left Łuck and headed southwards to Kosów Huculski, which at that time was located near the Polish–Romanian border.

As a result of the invasion of Poland from both sides and the Molotov–Ribbentrop Pact, Łuck, along with the rest of western Volyn, was annexed by the Soviet Union. Most of the factories (including the almost-finished radio station) were dismantled and sent east to Russia. Approximately 10,000 of the city's Polish inhabitants (chiefly ethnic Poles, but also Polish Jews) were deported in cattle trucks to Kazakhstan and 1,550 were arrested by the NKVD. Over 50 Poles who were either born or lived and worked in Łuck, including policemen, local officials, judges, corrections officers, and the director of the local museum, were murdered by the Russians in the Katyn massacre in 1940.

After the start of Operation Barbarossa, the city was captured by the Wehrmacht on 25 June 1941. Thousands of Polish and Ukrainian prisoners were shot by the retreating NKVD responsible for political prisons. The inmates were offered amnesty, and on the morning of 23 June, they were ordered to exit the building en masse. They were gunned down by Soviet tanks. Some 4,000 captives, including Poles, Jews and Ukrainians were massacred.

Upon Nazi occupation, most of the Jewish inhabitants of the city were forced into a new Łuck Ghetto and then murdered at the execution site on Górka Połonka hill not far from the city. In total, more than 25,000 Jews were executed there at point-blank range, men, women and children. The Łuck Ghetto was liquidated entirely through the Holocaust by bullets. In 1941–1942, the German occupiers also operated a forced labour camp for Jews in the city. During the massacres of Poles in Volhynia, approximately 10,000 Poles were murdered by the Ukrainian Insurgent Army in the area. It was captured by the Red Army on 2 February 1944.

=== Soviet Union ===
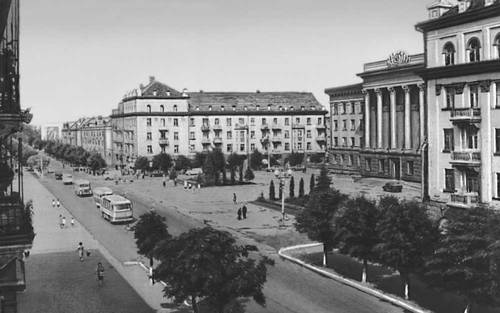
Lutsk in the 1960s

After the end of the war, the remaining Polish inhabitants of the city were expelled, mostly to the areas that are sometimes referred to as the Polish Regained Territories. The city became an industrial centre in the Ukrainian SSR. The major changes in the city's demographics had the final result that by the end of the war, the city was almost entirely Ukrainian. During the Cold War, the city hosted the Lutsk air base.

Under Soviet rule, Lutsk became a centre of food production, as well as casting, mechanical, machine-building, construction and light industry. A pedagogical school (now Lesya Ukrainka Volyn National University), a drama theatre, a philharmonic hall and a museum were opened in the city.

=== Independent Ukraine ===
As one of the largest cities in western Ukraine, Lutsk became the seat of the General Consulate of Poland in 2003.

On 21 July 2020, a hostage crisis took place, involving a man armed with a firearm and explosives who stormed a bus and took 16 people hostage at about 9:25 am. Police said that they had identified the hostage-taker and that he had expressed dissatisfaction with "Ukraine's system" on social media. Ukrainian President Volodymyr Zelenskyy said that shots had been heard and that the bus had been damaged. The incident led to police blocking off the city centre. The standoff was eventually resolved after several hours, with all of the hostages being freed and the hostage taker being arrested.

Fire at a fuel depot in Lutsk after Russian shelling on 27 March 2022

On 11 March 2022, as part of the Russian invasion of Ukraine, the Russian army fired four missiles at Lutsk military airfield, killing two Ukrainian servicemen and wounding six. On 27 March, a fuel depot in Lutsk was struck by a Russian missile. The city took in refugees from Ukrainian territories affected by warfare. As of 28 March 2022, there were 15,000 refugees accommodated in Lutsk and the surrounding area. Their number increased to about 68,000 by 9 June. On 22 October, a missile strike was launched at a local energy infrastructure facility. On the night of 9 July 2025, Russian forces launched a massive drone strike, targeting Lutsk in particular.

=== Jewish history ===
The earliest reference to a Jewish presence in Lutsk dates to 1409. In 1432, the Jews of the town were granted the same rights as their counterparts in Krakow and Lithuania. The Jews of the city were affected by the expulsions of the Jews from Lithuania, but both the Rabbinic and Karaite communities were reestablished in 1503. In 1552, 56 of the 229 households in Lutsk were Jewish, and they made their revenues by leasing the revenues of the Lutsk customs house. However, during the Khmelnytsky uprising, the Jews of the city were massacred; by the end of the uprising, only 32 of the 75 households survived. By 1662, the Jews accounted for half of the population of Lutsk and the city was one of main centers of Judaism in Volhynia. Despite blood libels in 1696 and 1764 and despite oppression by the Russian Empire, the Jewish population continued to grow, and by 1897, they numbered 9468 and were 60% of the city's population.

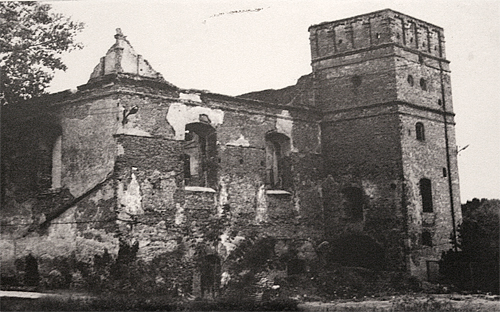
Destroyed synagogue during World War II

By the end of the eighteenth century, several Hasidic groups had established themselves in the city, and by the 1830s a small circle of maskilim had also established themselves. During the early twentieth century, a private school, a Talmud Torah for poor children, and a yeshiva were established. During World War I, under threat of war or expulsions, the city's Jews entrusted their relics to the ethnographer S. An-sky. From 1918 to 1920, under threat of the pogroms of Russian Civil War, Jewish self-defense groups were active in the city. In the interwar period, the town became a provincial Jewish center with active political parties, Jewish participation in government, and a Jewish representative to the Sejm. Jewish cultural life included newspapers, schools, and a Beit Yosef yeshiva, and about 50 synagogues. From 1929 to 1939, the community was led by Rabbi Zalman Sorotskin, with Jews numbering 15,879, about 40% of the population, in 1937.

After the Soviet annexation in 1939, Jewish institutions were closed and leaders arrested. Following the German invasion, pogroms, mass shootings, ghettoization, and deportations to concentration camps led to the murder of more than 25,000 Jews in the city during the Holocaust, though some prisoners resisted during the liquidation of a labor camp in December 1942.

After the Soviets recaptured the city in 1944, only about 150 Jews returned, and by 1959 just 600 remained, while Jewish sites, including synagogues and cemeteries, were repurposed or destroyed. By the 1990s, only 160 Jews were left in the city, with most of them being elderly.

== Population ==
Historical population
Year	Pop.	±%
1864	5,000	—
1897	14,800	+196.0%
1912	26,600	+79.7%
1921	21,200	−20.3%
1931	35,600	+67.9%
1939	39,000	+9.6%
1961	63,000	+61.5%
2001	205,585	+226.3%
2022	220,986	+7.5%

As of 1 January 2022, the population of the Lutsk city territorial community was 244,678 people, with 220,986 people in the city of Lutsk.

=== Ethnic groups ===
Distribution of the population by ethnicity according to the 2001 Ukrainian census:

Ethnic groups in Lutsk
	percent
Ukrainians	92.52%
Russians	6.16%
Belarusians	0.53%
Poles	0.17%
Jews	0.08%
Germans	0.05%
Tatars	0.05%
Armenians	0.05%
Moldovans	0.04%

=== Language ===
Distribution of the population by native language according to the 2001 census:

Language	Number	Percentage
Ukrainian	190 926	92.87%
Russian	13 958	6.79%
Other or undecided	701	0.34%
Total	205 585	100.00%

According to a survey conducted by the International Republican Institute in April–May 2023, 98% of the city's population spoke Ukrainian at home, and 1% spoke Russian.

== Geography ==
=== Climate ===
Lutsk has a humid continental climate (Dfb in the Köppen climate classification).

Climate data for Lutsk (1991–2020)
Month	Jan	Feb	Mar	Apr	May	Jun	Jul	Aug	Sep	Oct	Nov	Dec	Year
Mean daily maximum °C (°F)	−0.4 (31.3)	1.3 (34.3)	6.7 (44.1)	14.7 (58.5)	20.4 (68.7)	23.8 (74.8)	25.6 (78.1)	25.2 (77.4)	19.4 (66.9)	13.0 (55.4)	6.1 (43.0)	1.0 (33.8)	13.1 (55.6)
Daily mean °C (°F)	−2.9 (26.8)	−1.9 (28.6)	2.3 (36.1)	9.1 (48.4)	14.4 (57.9)	17.9 (64.2)	19.7 (67.5)	19.0 (66.2)	13.8 (56.8)	8.3 (46.9)	3.1 (37.6)	−1.4 (29.5)	8.5 (47.3)
Mean daily minimum °C (°F)	−5.3 (22.5)	−4.6 (23.7)	−1.2 (29.8)	4.2 (39.6)	9.1 (48.4)	12.6 (54.7)	14.5 (58.1)	13.7 (56.7)	9.3 (48.7)	4.7 (40.5)	0.6 (33.1)	−3.7 (25.3)	4.5 (40.1)
Average precipitation mm (inches)	30 (1.2)	28 (1.1)	31 (1.2)	37 (1.5)	64 (2.5)	69 (2.7)	93 (3.7)	59 (2.3)	54 (2.1)	40 (1.6)	35 (1.4)	39 (1.5)	579 (22.8)
Average precipitation days (≥ 1.0 mm)	7.9	8.2	7.3	7.5	9.0	8.9	10.0	7.4	7.6	7.3	7.7	9.4	98.2
Average relative humidity (%)	87.3	84.6	78.1	68.8	69.3	71.5	72.9	71.7	77.6	81.8	87.6	88.7	78.3
Source: NOAA

== Industry and commerce ==
Lutsk is an important centre of industry. Factories producing cars, shoes, bearings, furniture, machines and electronics, as well as weaveries, steel mills and a chemical plant are located in the area.

- VGP JSC – manufacture of sanitary and hygienic products
- LuAZ – automobile-manufacturing plant, part of Bogdan group
- SKF – manufacture of bearings, seals, lubrication and lubrication systems, maintenance products, mechatronics products, power transmission products and related services globally
- Modern-Expo Group – one of the largest manufacturers and suppliers of equipment (metal shelving, high racks systems, checkouts, catering equipment, refrigeration equipment, POS-equipment and guidance systems) for retail and warehouse use in Central and Eastern Europe
- A brewery founded in 1910 by Václav Zeman, an ethnic Czech, still functions in Lutsk.

== Places of interest ==
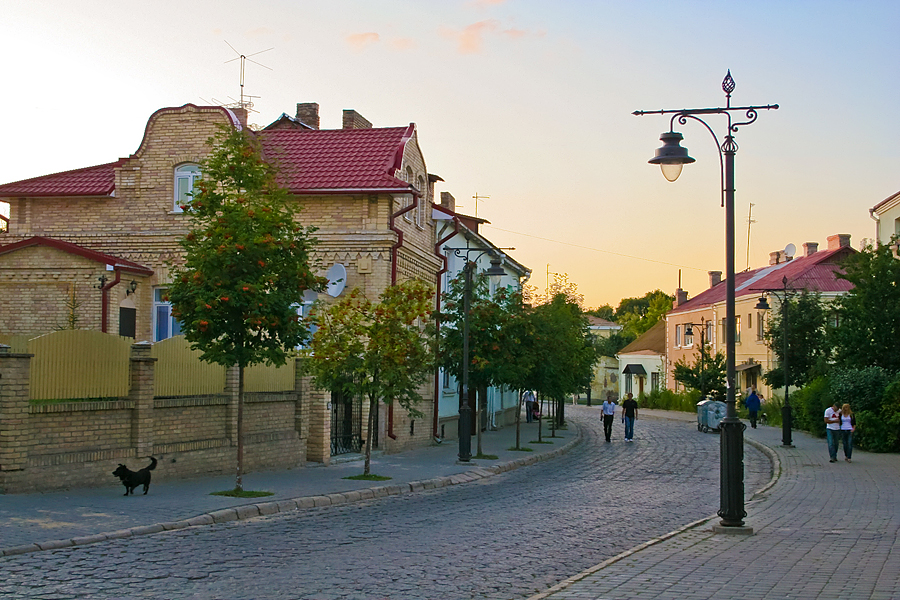
Lutsk Old Town

- Lubart's Castle. The Upper Castle dates from the 13th century, and the Lower Castle from the 14th century
- Saint Peter and Paul Cathedral, a Catholic cathedral built 1610 as a Jesuit church, reconstructed in 1781
- Great Synagogue, built in 1626–1629
- Holy Trinity Orthodox Cathedral, built 1755 as a church and monastery of Bernardines
- Lutheran Church
- Complex of Lutsk Orthodox Fellowship
- Market square
- Lesya Ukrainka street
- Monasteries, both Catholic and Orthodox: Basilians (17th century), Dominicans (17th century), Trinitarians (18th century) and Charites (18th century)
- Two 16th-century Greek-Catholic churches
- Lutsk compact overhead powerline, a powerline of an unusual type.
- One of the longest buildings in the world: Apartment building on Sobornosti av. and Molodi st. (50.761219°N, 25.368719°E) Length: 1750 m.
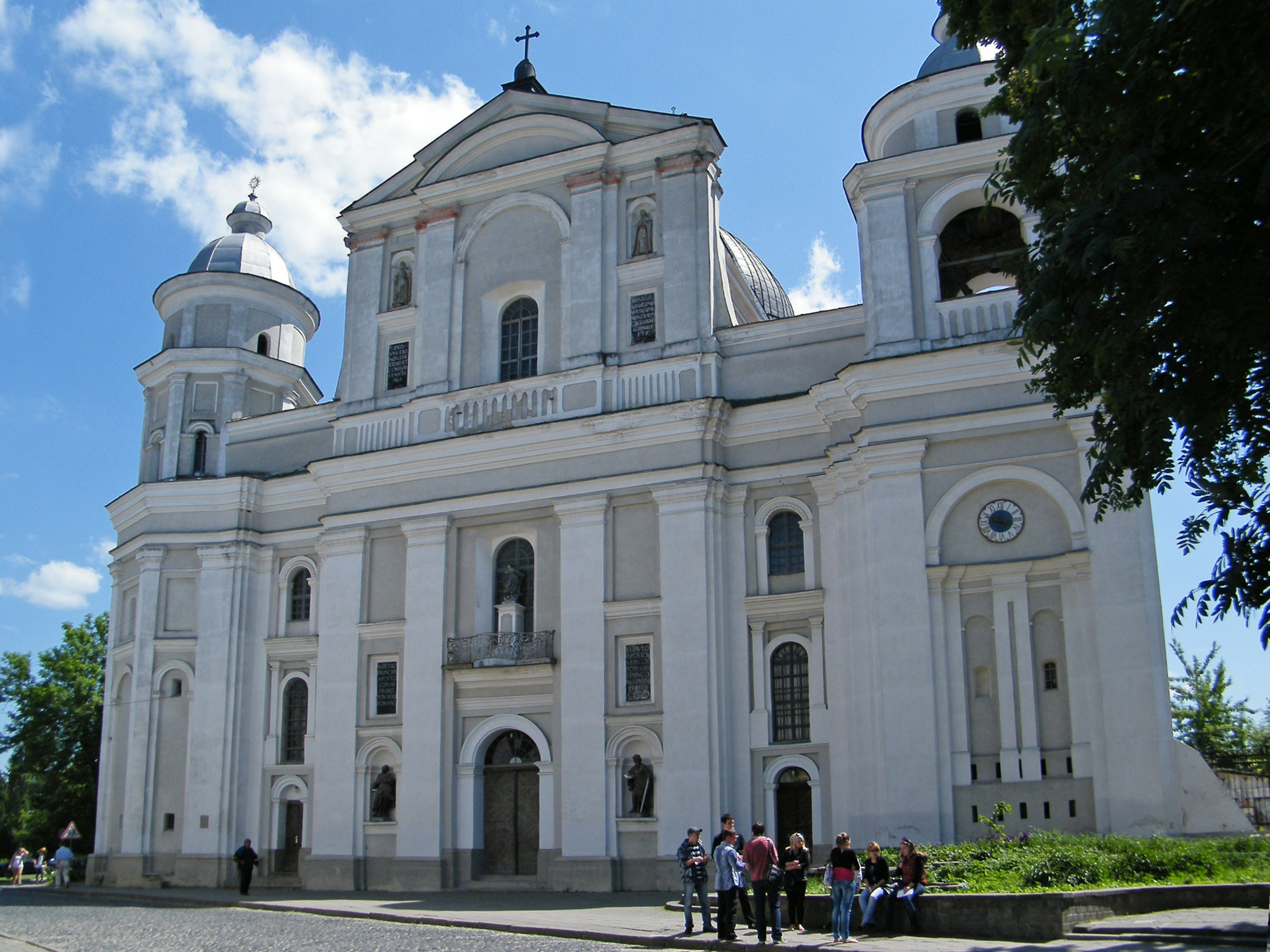
St. Peter and Paul Cathedral

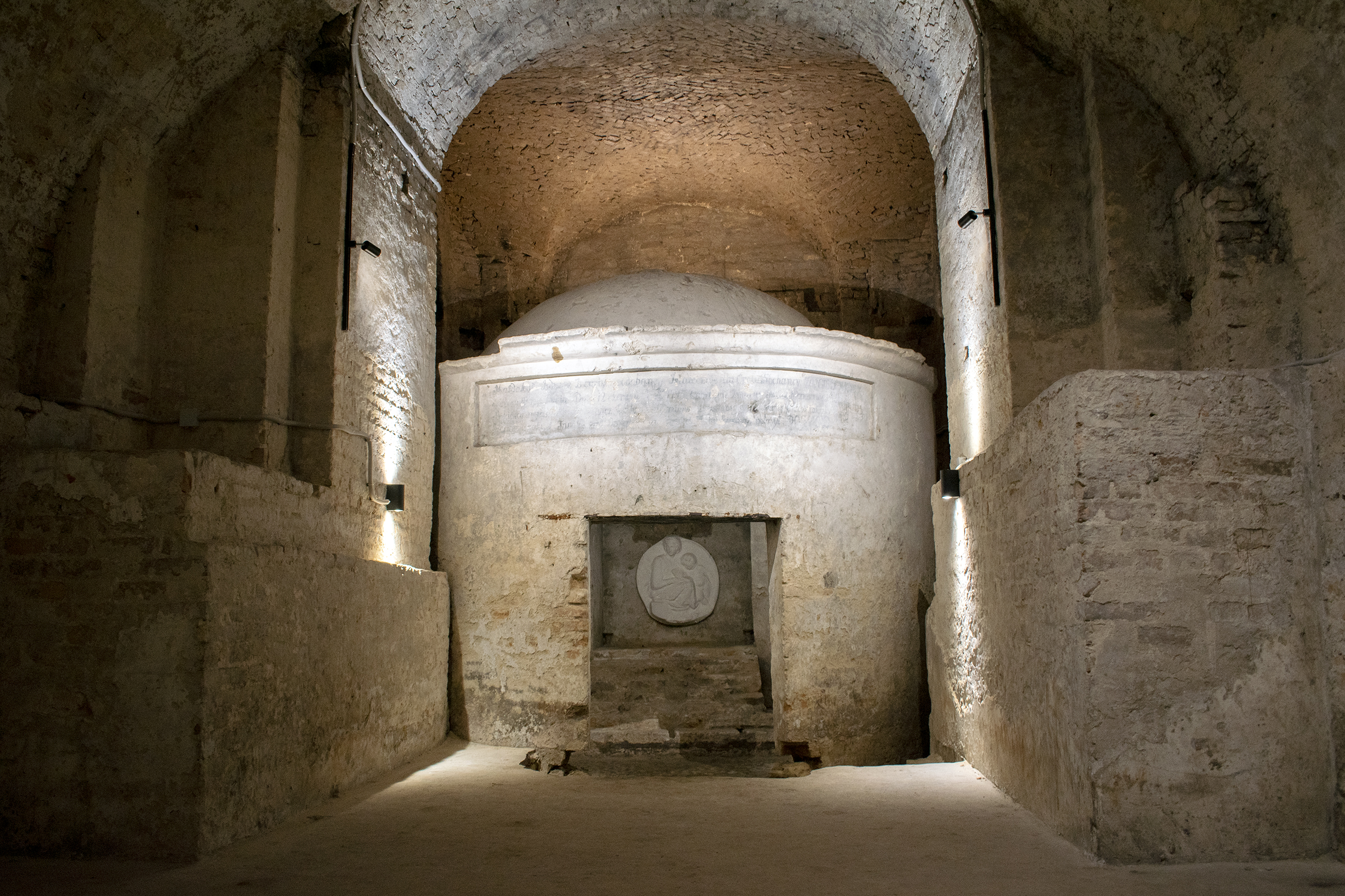
Cells of the St. Peter and Paul Cathedral

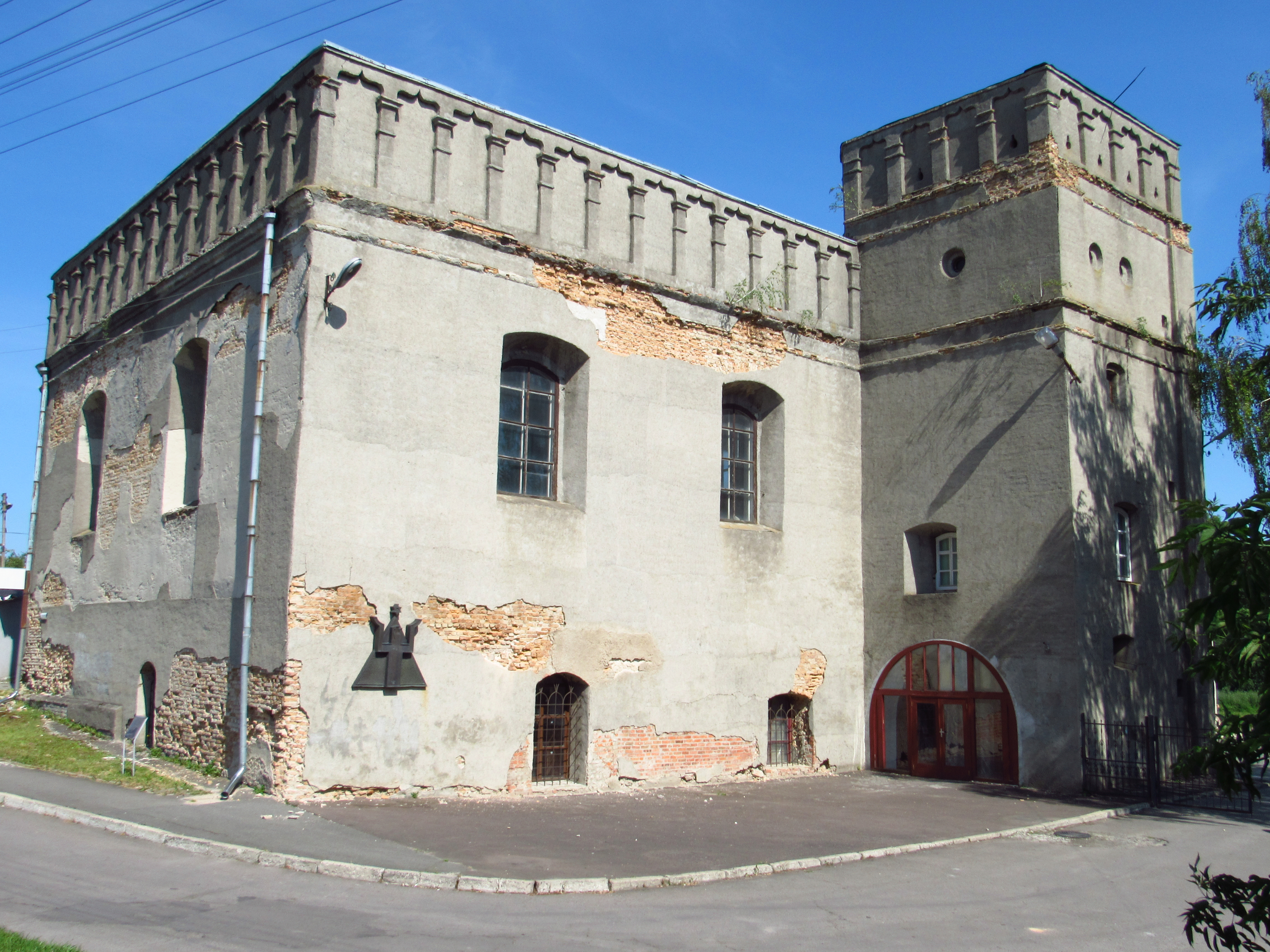
Great Synagogue

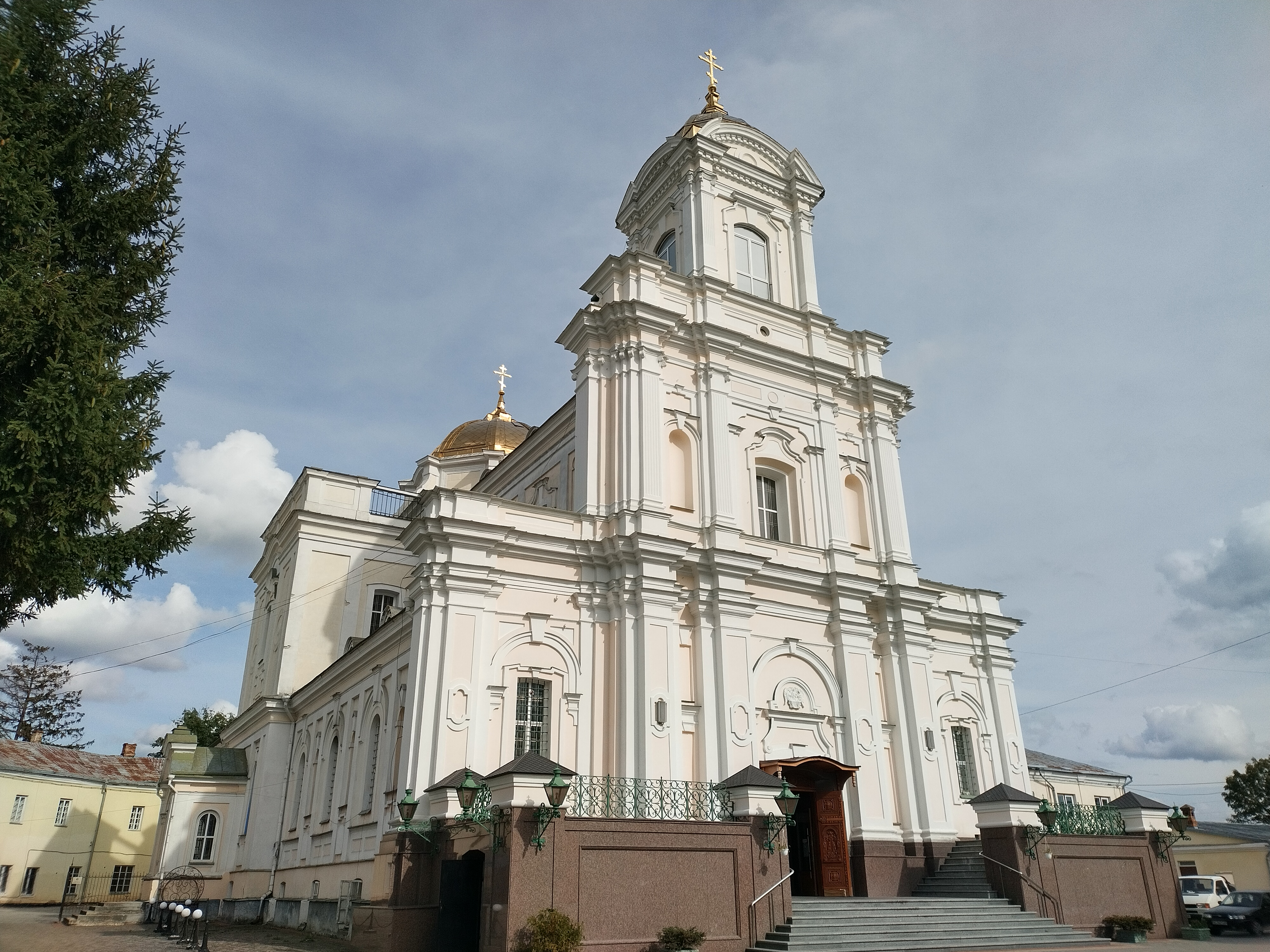
Holy Trinity Cathedral

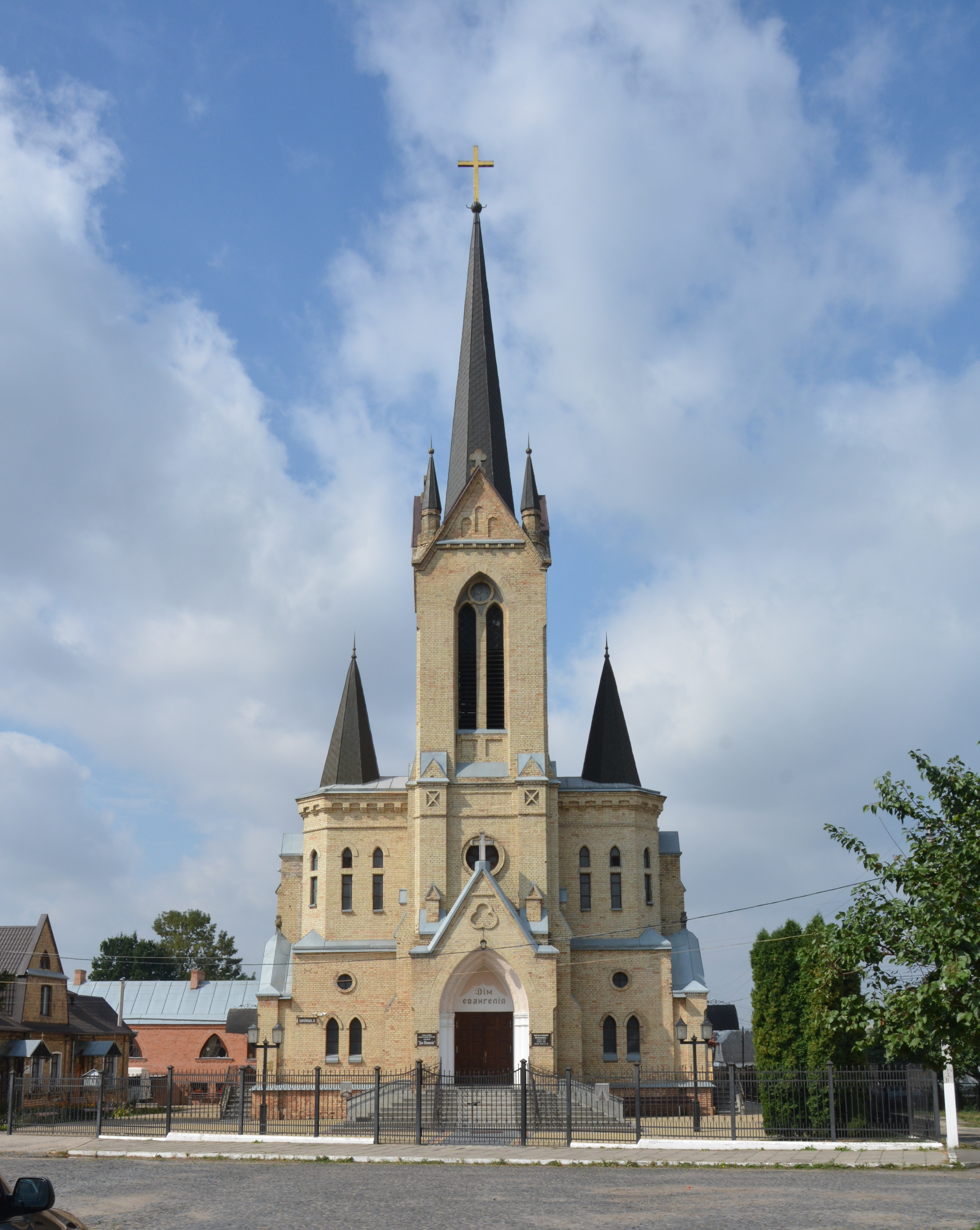
Lutheran church

== Theatres and museums ==
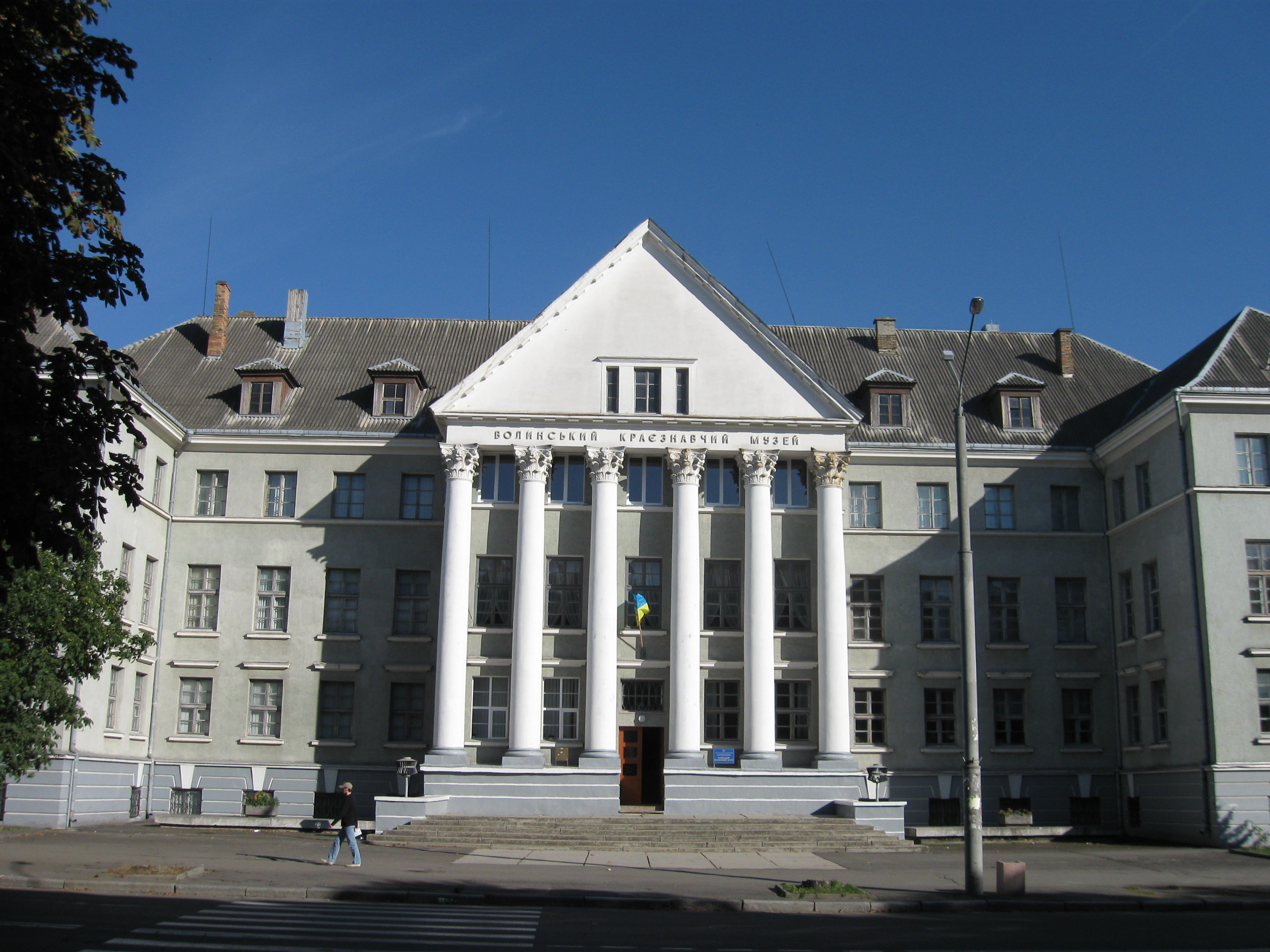
Volyn Regional Museum

- Drama Theatre, built in 1939 (uk)
- Children's Puppet Theater
- Museum of Regional Studies. Address: Shopena St. 20
- Museum of Ukrainian army and ammunition opened in 1999. Address: Lutsk, vul. Taborishi 4
- Museum of Volyn Icon was opened in August 1993. A relatively small museum in the centre of the town. Has some interesting and very old icons. Address: vul. Yaroshchuka 5. (behind the Lesia Ukrainka Volyn State University)
- "THE KORSAKS’ MUSEUM OF THE CONTEMPORARY UKRAINIAN ART". Address: vul. Karbysheva 1

== Religion ==
The city was the episcopal seat of the Eparchy of Lutsk–Ostroh in the Ruthenian Uniate Church. The city was also the centre of the short-lived Ukrainian Catholic Apostolic Exarchate of Volhynia, Polesia and Pidliashia. Currently, it is the seat of the Roman Catholic Diocese of Lutsk and of the Exarchate of Lutsk in the Ukrainian Greek Catholic Church. In the Orthodox Church of Ukraine, the former Catholic cathedral of the Holy Trinity is the seat of the Eparchy of Volhynia.

== Notable people ==
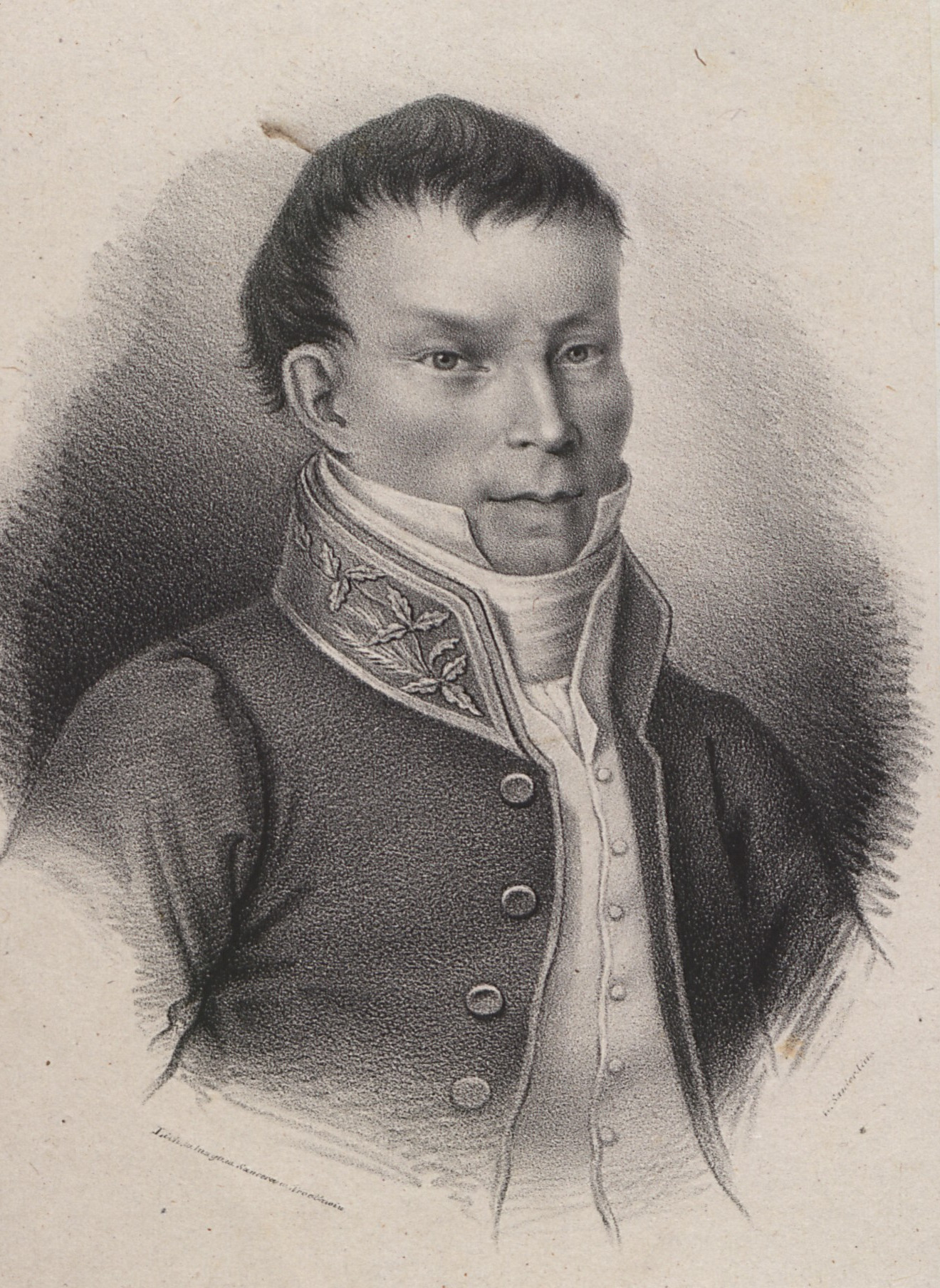
Alojzy Feliński

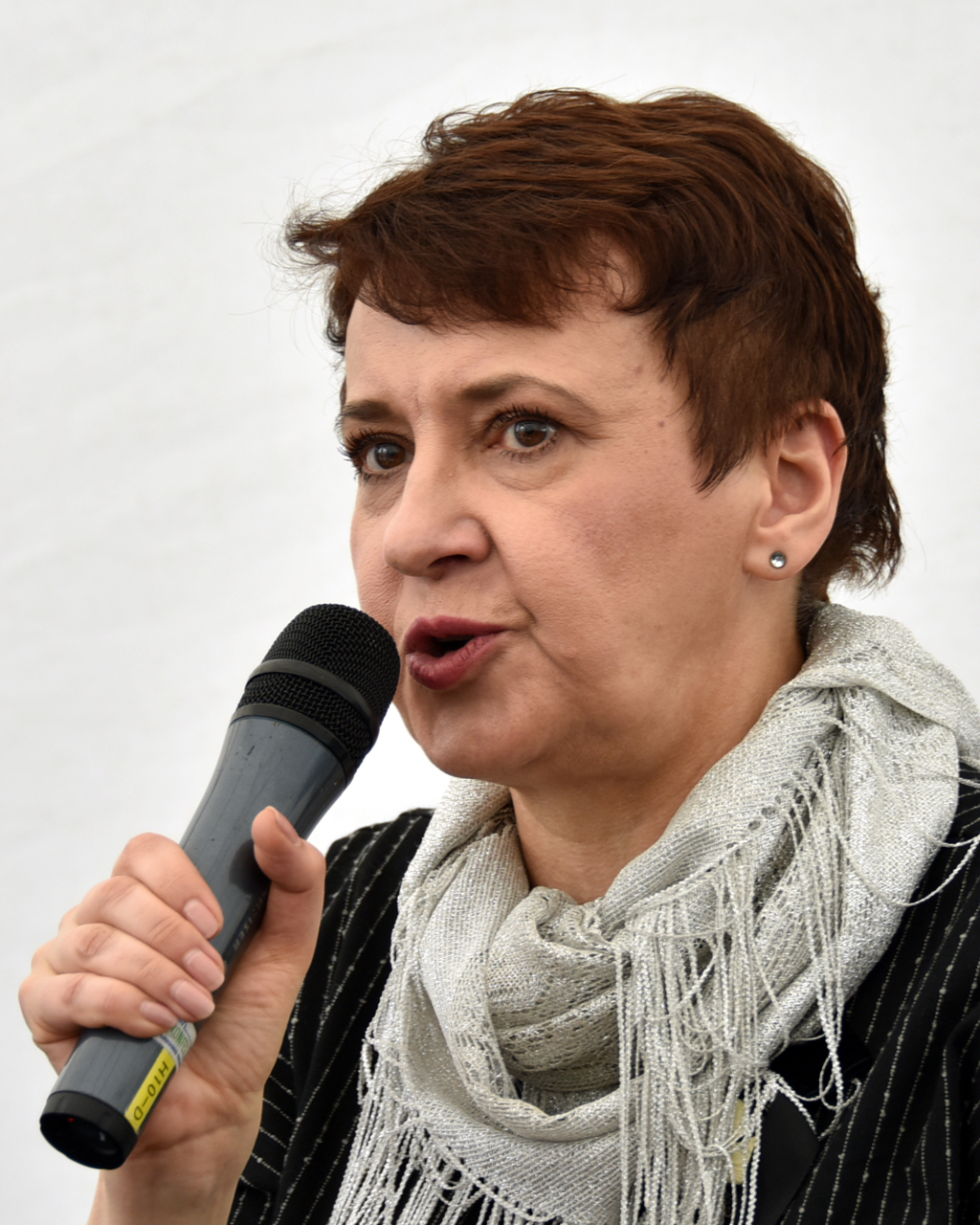
Oksana Zabuzhko

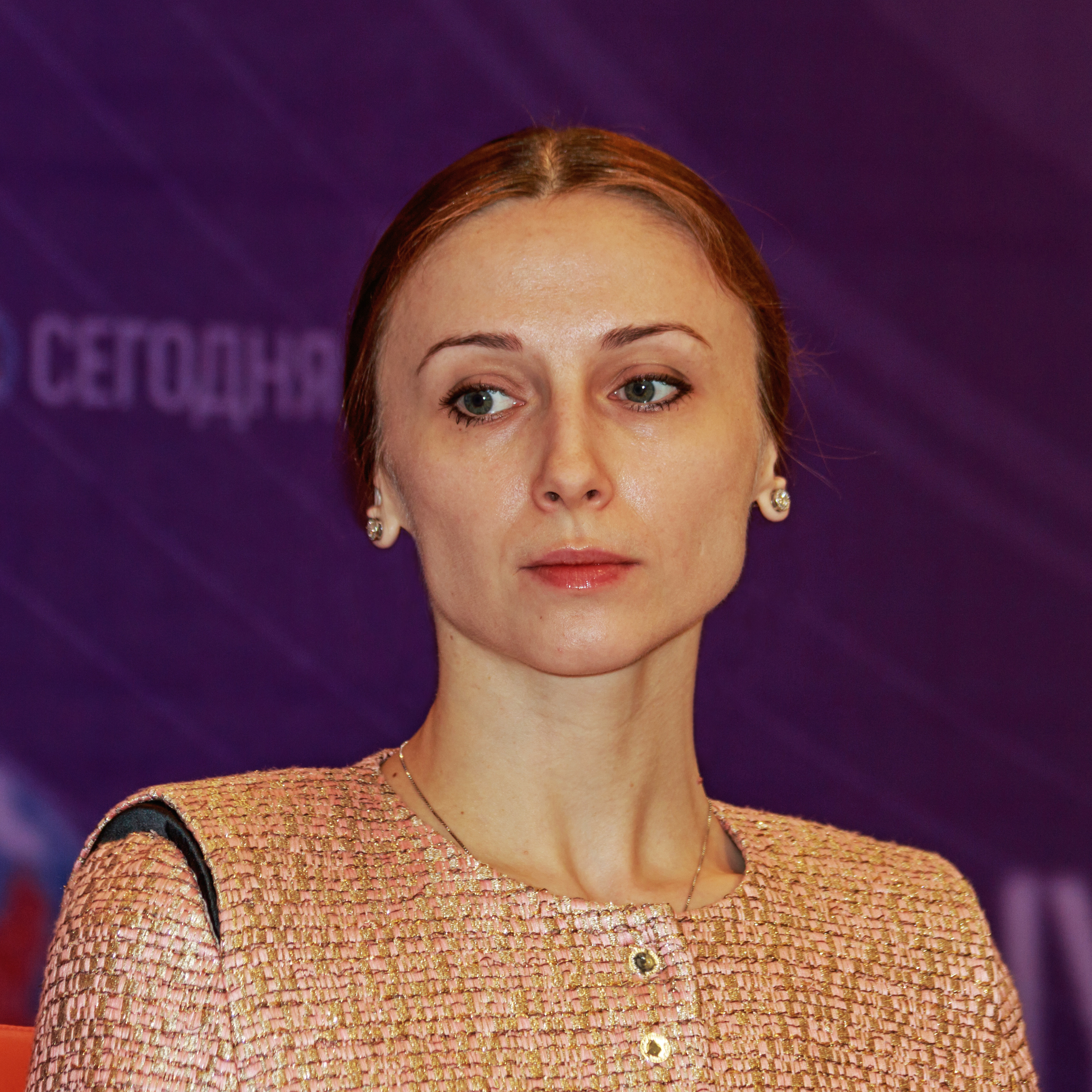
Svetlana Zakharova

- Shlomo Ben-Yosef (1913–1938), member of Revisionist Zionist underground group Irgun.
- Volodymyr Bondar (born 1968), politician, Governor of Volyn Oblast 2005–2007
- Benedykt Chmielowski (1700–1763), Polish priest, author of the encyclopedia, Nowe Ateny
- Count Włodzimierz Czacki (1834–1888), Polish Cardinal (Catholic Church) from 1882
- Alojzy Feliński (1771–1820), Polish scientist and writer
- Abraham Firkovich (1786–1874), Karaite writer and Hakham and collector of ancient manuscripts
- Shlomo Flam (died 1813), Hasidic rabbi and maggid in Lutsk
- Kateryna Gornostai (born 1989), Ukrainian film director, screenwriter and film editor.
- Andrzej Hałaciński (1891–1940), Polish military officer, poet and notary, victim of the Katyn massacre
- Halshka Hulevychivna (c.1577–1642), Orthodox noblewoman and philanthropist, one of the founders of Kyiv Mohyla Academy.
- Bolesław Kontrym (1898–1953), Polish Army officer, a participant in the Warsaw Uprising
- Mikołaj Kruszewski (1851–1887), Polish linguist, co-inventor of the concept of phonemes
- Dinora Pines (1918–2002), British physician and psychoanalyst, especially feminine psychology
- Krystyna Piotrowska (1938–2022), Polish geologist, cartographer, professor
- Oleksandr Polozhynskyi (born 1972), Ukrainian singer and presenter
- Mykola Riabchuk (born 1953), Ukrainian publicist and critic
- Volodymyr Runchak (born 1960) Ukrainian accordionist, conductor and composer
- Shmuel Shilo (1929–2011), Israeli actor, director and producer
- Florian Siwicki (1925–2013), Polish military officer, diplomat and communist politician.
- Zalman Sorotzkin (1881–1966), Orthodox rabbi who served as the rabbi of Lutsk and author
- Mordecai Sultansky (ca. 1772–1862), Karaite Jewish hakham and scholar
- Tartak (founded 1994), music band; all members were born in Lutsk
- Shimshon Unichman (1907–1961), Israeli politician and member of the Knesset
- Svitlana Winnikow (1919–1981), engineer, first woman professor of Mechanical Engineering-Engineering Mechanics at Michigan Technological University
- Oksana Zabuzhko (born 1960), contemporary Ukrainian poet, writer and essayist
- Svetlana Zakharova (born 1979), Ukrainian prima ballerina with the Bolshoi Ballet
- Joseph Zinker (born 1934), Gestalt psychology therapist, painter and sculptor.

=== Sport ===
- Peter Bondra (born 1968), Ukrainian-born Slovak ice hockey player
- Oleksandr Chyzhevskyi (born 1971) football coach and former player with 513 club caps.
- Iurii Kostiuk (born 1977) a Ukrainian biathlete and gold medallist at the Cross-country skiing at the 2006 Winter Paralympics
- Volodymyr Mozolyuk (born 1964) is a Ukrainian retired footballer with over 540 club caps.
- Anzhelika Savrayuk (born 1989), Italian rhythmic gymnast, team bronze medallist at the 2012 Summer Olympics
- Vyacheslav Shevchuk (born 1979) is a retired footballer with 34 club caps and 56 with Ukraine
- Anatoliy Tymoshchuk (born 1979), a footballer with 533 club caps and 144 for Ukraine

=== Righteous Among the Nations (rescuers of Jews in Lutsk) ===
People on the Polish list of Righteous Among the Nations

- Mikołaj Charłamow – using his contacts at a local printing house, supplied Jews with forged kenkarts (identity cards). He arranged a hiding place in Lutsk for Rai Eskin and her daughter and provided them with material assistance.
- Maria Chodin (later Gertner) – hid Josef Gertner, Isak Halpern, and Maurycy Kamienicki.
- Zygmunt and Wiktoria Strusiński and their daughter Irena Strusińska (later Bylica) – Zygmunt and Wiktoria were members of the Polish Home Army (AK), and Zygmunt commanded the Second Lutsk Inspectorate. They hid five Jews in their cellar. On 19 August 1943, Zygmunt was arrested; he was executed by the Germans three months later. Despite this, Wiktoria and her daughter continued to hide Jews until the end of the German occupation.
- Witold Fomienko – smuggled food, firewood, and medicines into the Lutsk ghetto and obtained false identity documents for Jews, enabling them to live outside the ghetto or travel to Germany for work posing as "Aryans". After the liquidation of the ghetto, he hid Jews in his own home and arranged hiding places for them with other Poles. After the war, he maintained contact with 36 people he had helped.
- Edward and Janina Mierzejewski – took in three-year-old Nina Hecht and raised her as their own child.
- Jadwiga Sztefec – supplied food and clothing to the Siemianowski Jewish family imprisoned in the ghetto. Later, she took in the underage Aleksander and Feliks Siemianowski. She registered Aleksander as an adopted orphan and sent Feliks to work as a farmhand in the countryside, where he survived the war.

People on the Czech list of Righteous Among the Nations

- Andrej and Věra Hrekov – hid Adam and Miriam Sawicki.
- Anna Koptová.

== In popular culture ==
The NKVD and Nazi massacres are mentioned in the Prix Goncourt awarded novel The Kindly Ones by Jonathan Littell.

Lutsk is a location taken over by post-apocalyptic slavers in the sci-fi/adventure novel The Crisis Pendant by Charlie Patterson.

== Twin towns – sister cities ==
Lutsk is twinned with:

- Bandırma, Turkey
- Białystok, Poland
- Brest, Belarus
- Chełm, Poland
- Kaunas, Lithuania
- Kyjov, Czech Republic
- Lippe (district), Germany
- Lublin, Poland
- Olsztyn, Poland
- Rzeszów, Poland
- Toruń, Poland
- Trakai, Lithuania
- Xiangtan, China
- Zamość, Poland
- (United States) Kent, USA

== Gallery ==
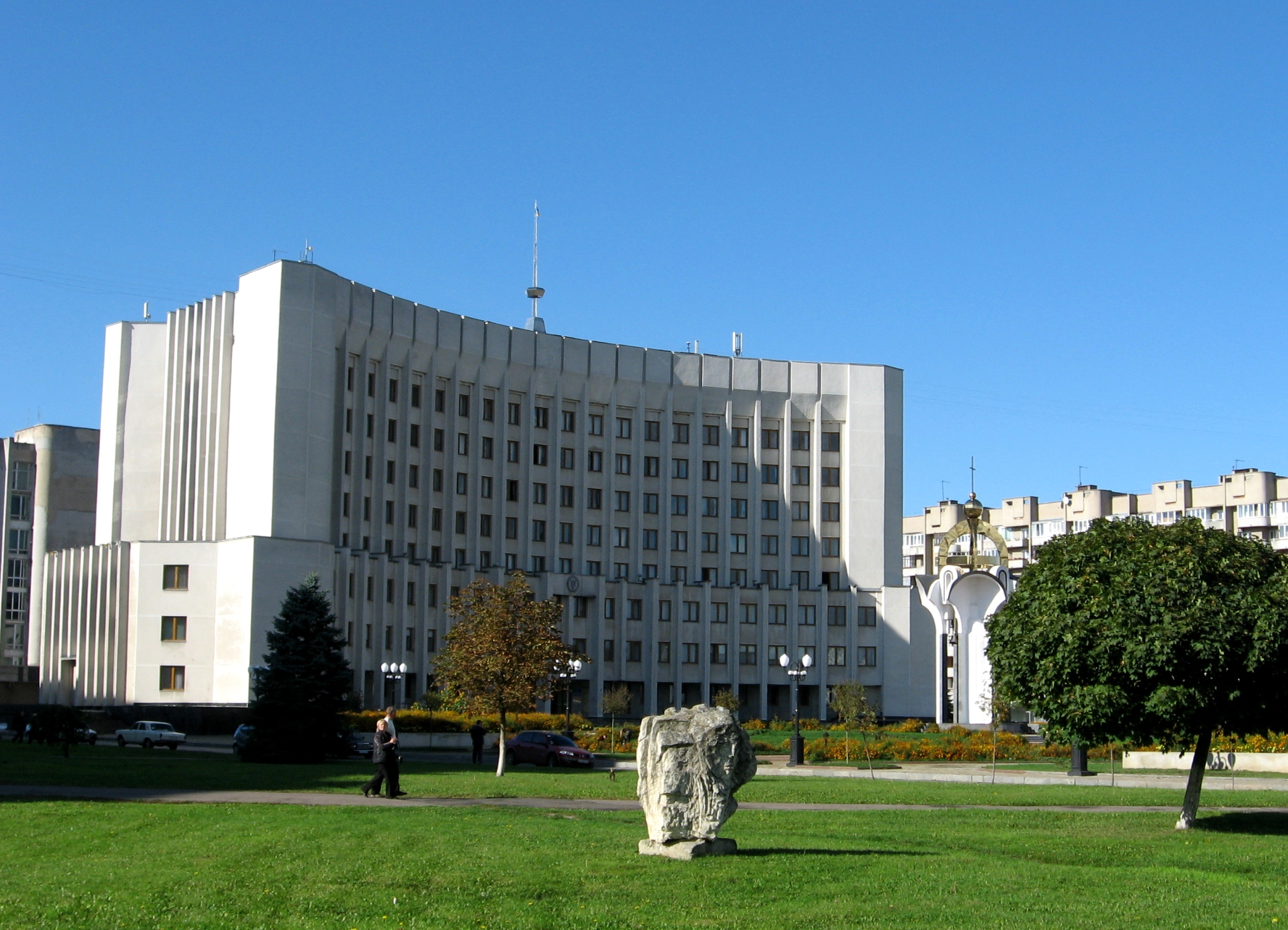
Volyn's regional administration in Lutsk

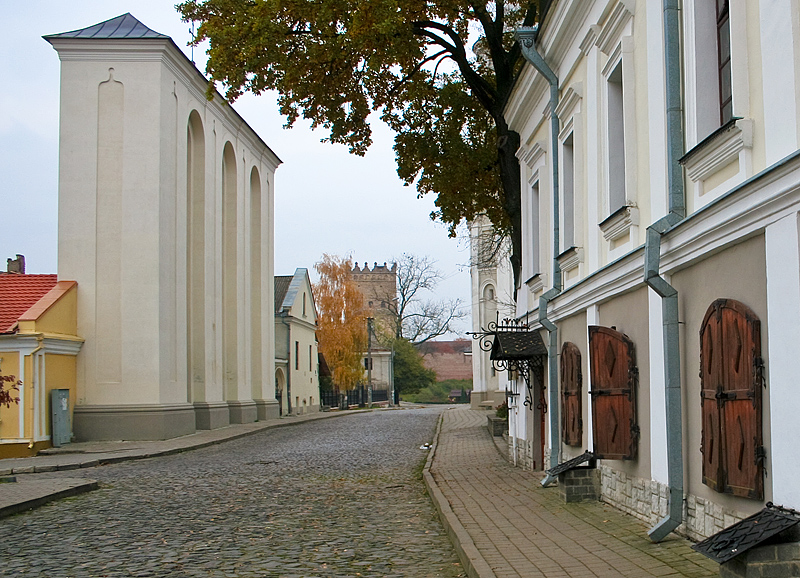
Kafedralna street

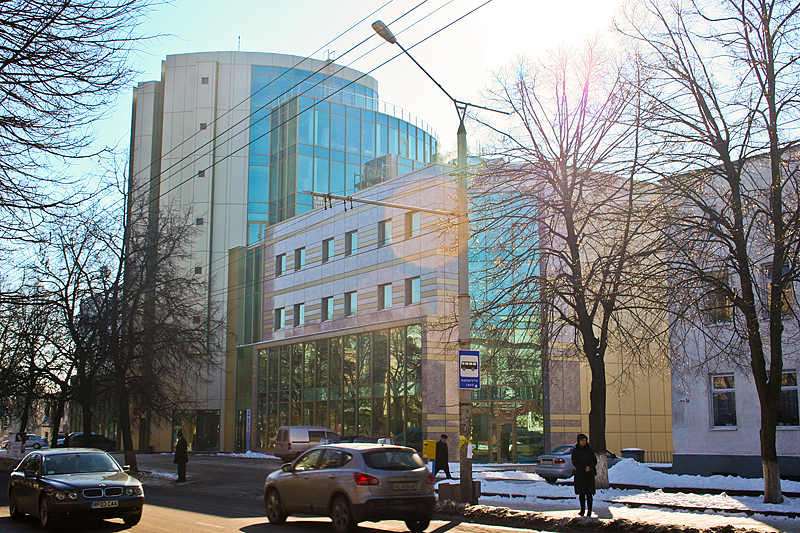
Modern architecture

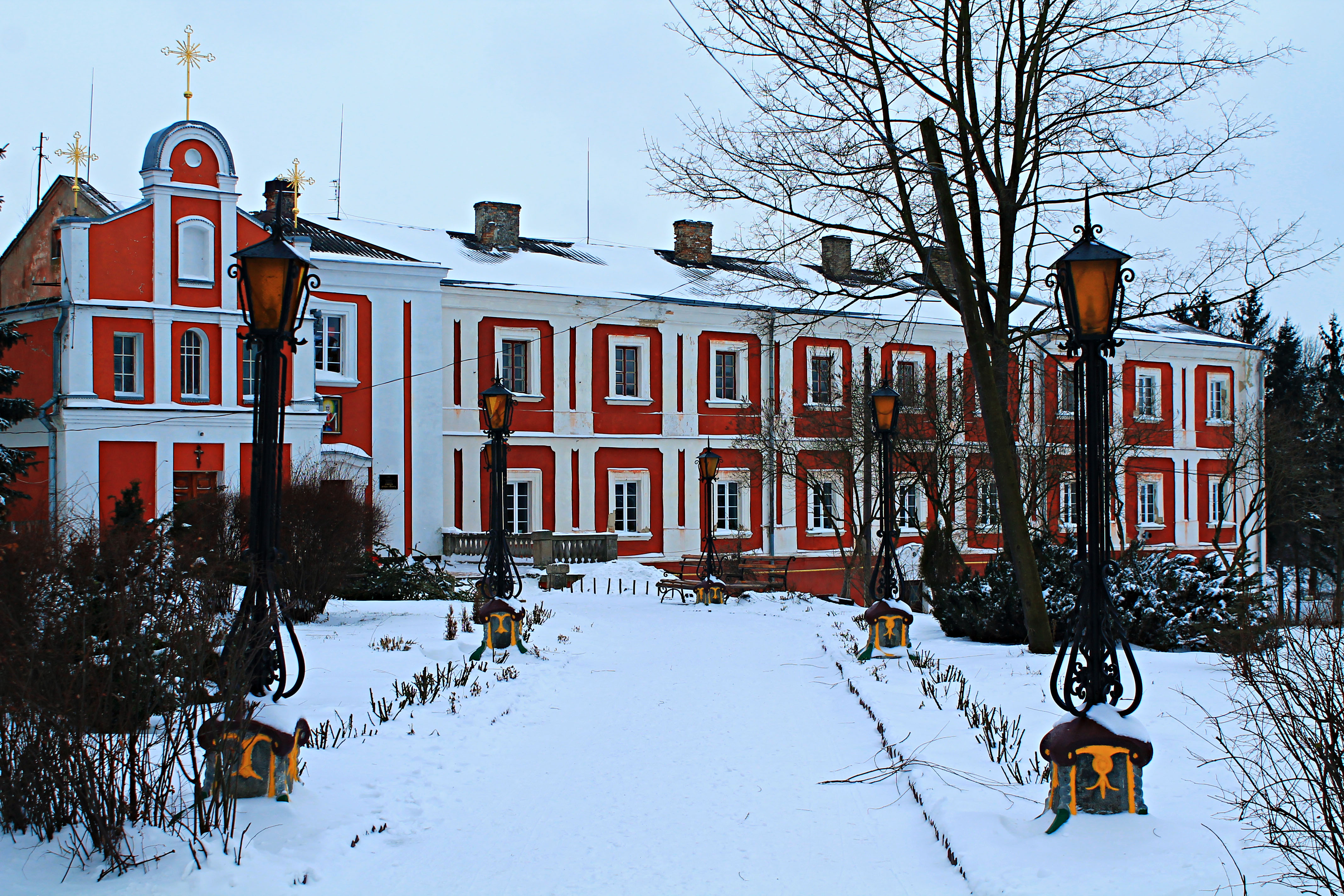
Dominican monastery

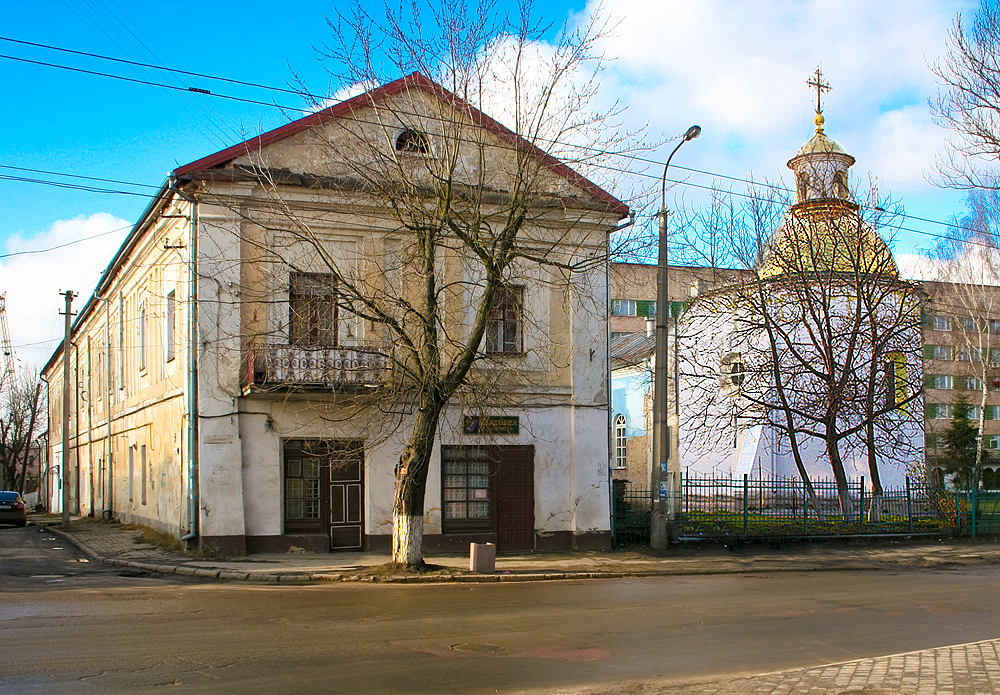
Orthodox Fellowship building

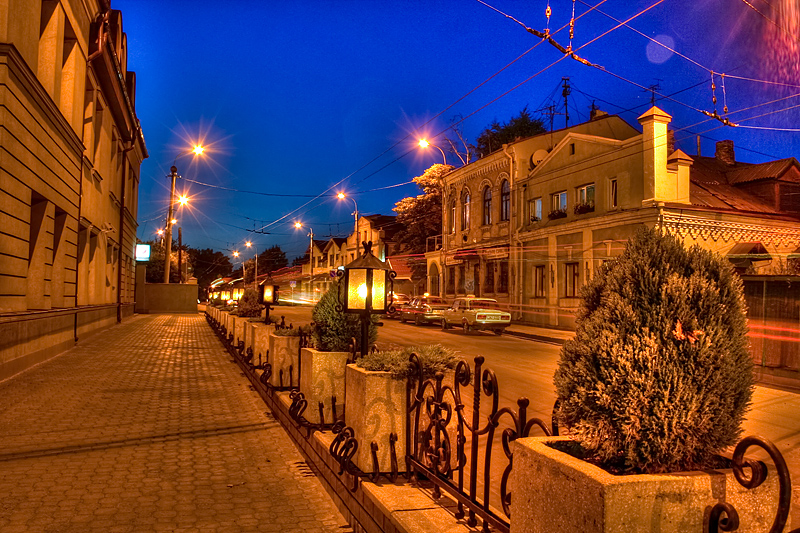
Daniel of Galicia street

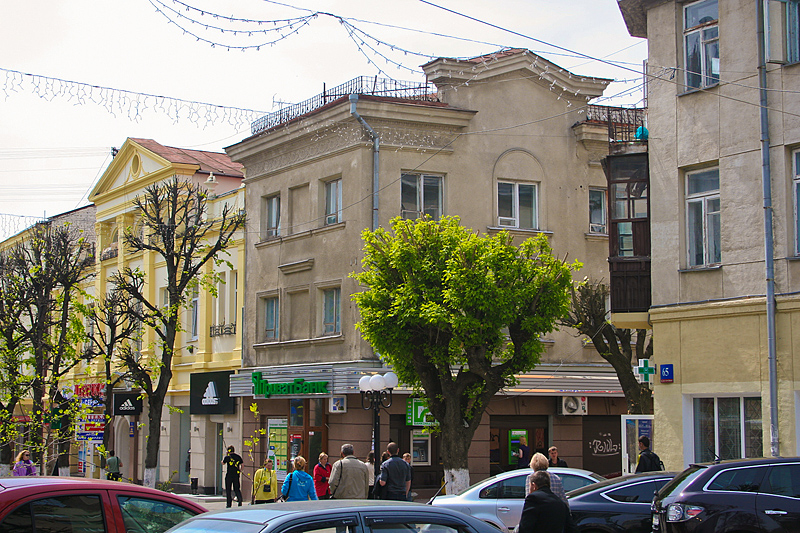
Lesya Ukrainka street

== Bibliography ==
- Nieć, Julian (1937). "Łuck na tle dziejów". Ziemia: ilustrowany miesięcznik krajoznawczy (in Polish). Vol. XXVII, no. 11–12. Warsaw.
