= Holy Trinity Orthodox Cathedral, Lutsk =

Bernardine monastery and church
- Holy Trinity Orthodox Cathedral
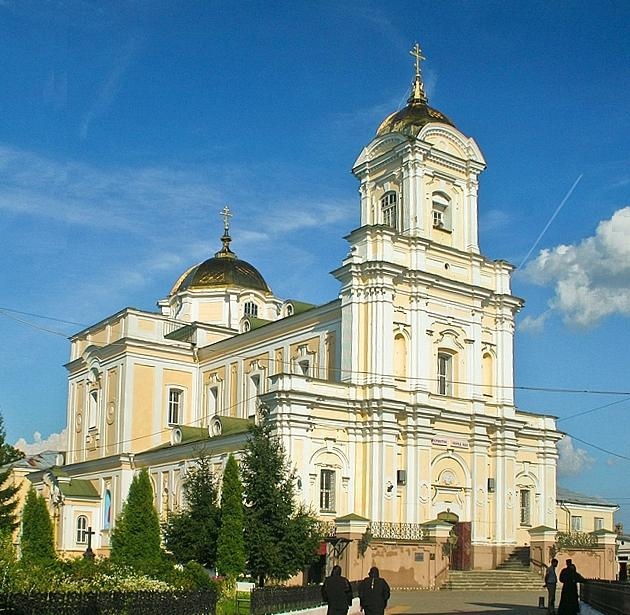
- Bernardine monastery and church
- 50°44′46″N 25°19′33″E
- Location: Lutsk
- Country: Ukraine
- Denomination: Eastern Orthodox

History
- Consecrated: 1789

Architecture
- Architect: Pawel Gizycki etc.
- Style: Baroque (primary), Classicism (secondary)
- Years built: 1720-1789

Immovable Monument of National Significance of Ukraine
- Official name: Костьол бернардинів (Bernardine Cathedral)
- Type: Architecture
- Reference no.: 030107/1

The Holy Trinity Orthodox Cathedral in Lutsk, Ukraine, forms part of the Bernardine Monastery and Church. It is located on Theatre Square in the center of the city. The monastery was built in 1721. The church, designed by architect Paweł Giżycki, was completed in 1789. Removed from ownership of the Bernardine monks in the second half of the 19th century, the complex of buildings was donated to the Eastern Orthodox community of Lutsk. In the 1870s, the church was reconstructed by adding a bell tower above the narthex and a central dome. Nowadays the church is the Holy Trinity Cathedral, belonging to the Ukrainian Orthodox Church. The former Bernardine monastery is used as a library and for small shops.

== History ==
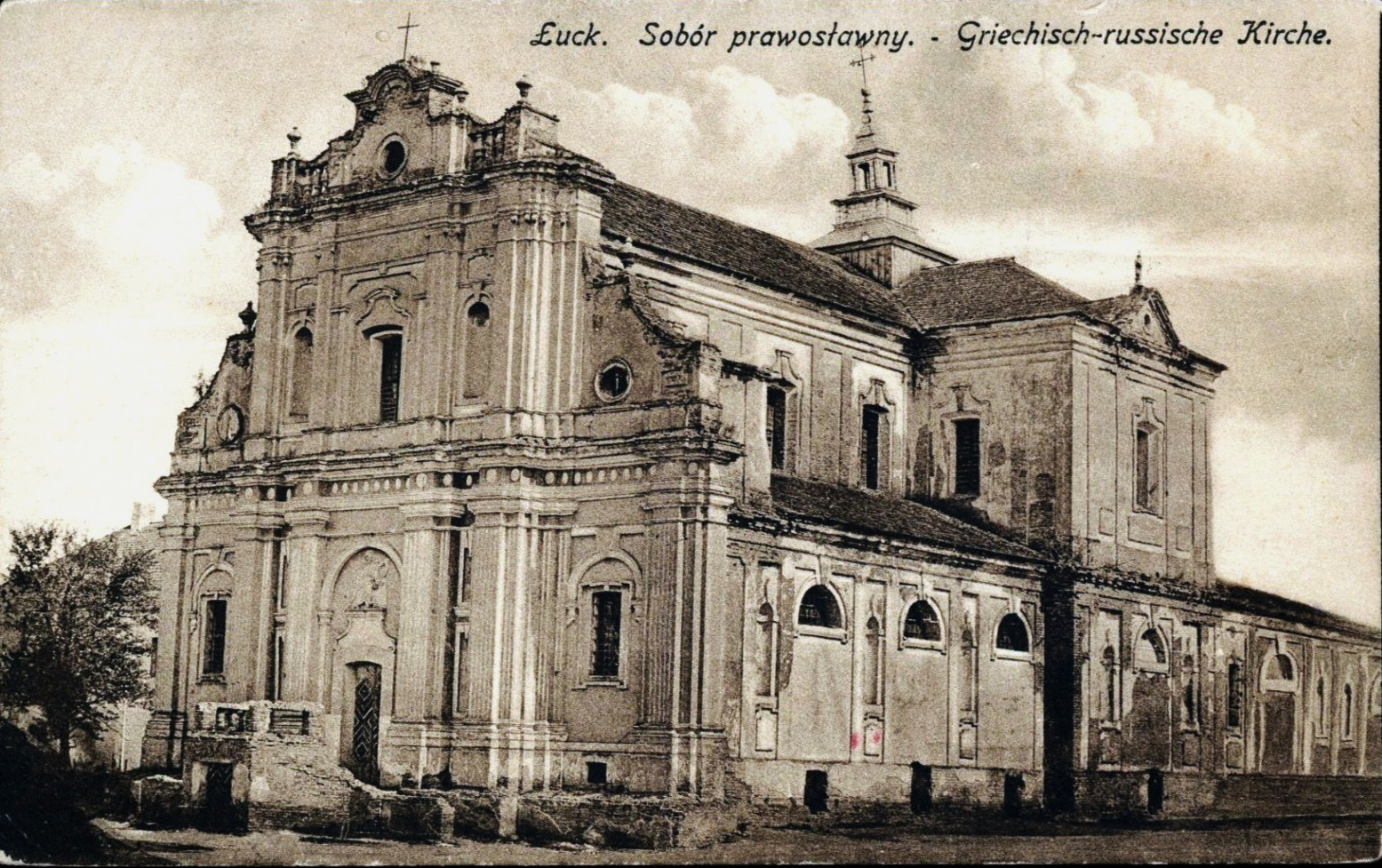
Bernardine church

Documentary sources show that a church already existed in the 15th century, located on the hill near Lutsk. In the 1640s, with the assistance of King Władysław IV Vasa, the church was donated to the Bernardines. The chapel of the Crying Jesus was built in the Catholic cemetery near the church. In 1648, church was robbed during the Cossack attack. An attempt by the organist to guard against theft resulted in the wooden church being burnt to the ground in 1696.

A member of the Radziwiłł family granted 40,000 złoty to build a new monastery in brick while 16,000 zloty were allocated to build dungeons. Shortly afterwards, the architect Paweł Giżycki designed a new church in the Baroque style. Although it was built for the Bernardines, the church was typically Jesuit. With funding from Karol Stanisław Radziwiłł, the church was completed in 1798.

In 1793, Russian troops seized the complex and used it as a military warehouse until 1800. In the early 19th century, part of the monastery was used as a residence by Bishop Kasper Kazimierz Cieciszowski. Annexed by the Russian Empire in 1795, Volyn had been independent for 30–40 years. It had ordinary cultural, religious and administrative status as a former voivodeship of the Polish–Lithuanian Commonwealth. But, its autonomy was abolished by the Russian government in the 1830s. As a result of the Russian oppression of the Catholic Church, many churches and monasteries were closed. In 1853, the Bernardine monastery of Lutsk was closed and the monks of the Order left the city. The church was transferred to the Orthodox community of Lutsk. In 1876, the church was reconstructed by architect K. Rastruhanov. The gallery connecting the church and monastery was demolished. A central dome and a bell tower were added, symbolising Russian Orthodox architecture.

Volyn belonged to Second Polish Republic from 1920 to 1930. Lutsk was an administrative center of Volyn Viovodship as it was then known. The voivodship administration was located in the former Bernardine monastery. This building was used by the Soviet police and the NKVD. On 12 August 1992, the church became the Holy Trinity Cathedral of the Ukrainian Orthodox Church.

== Architecture ==
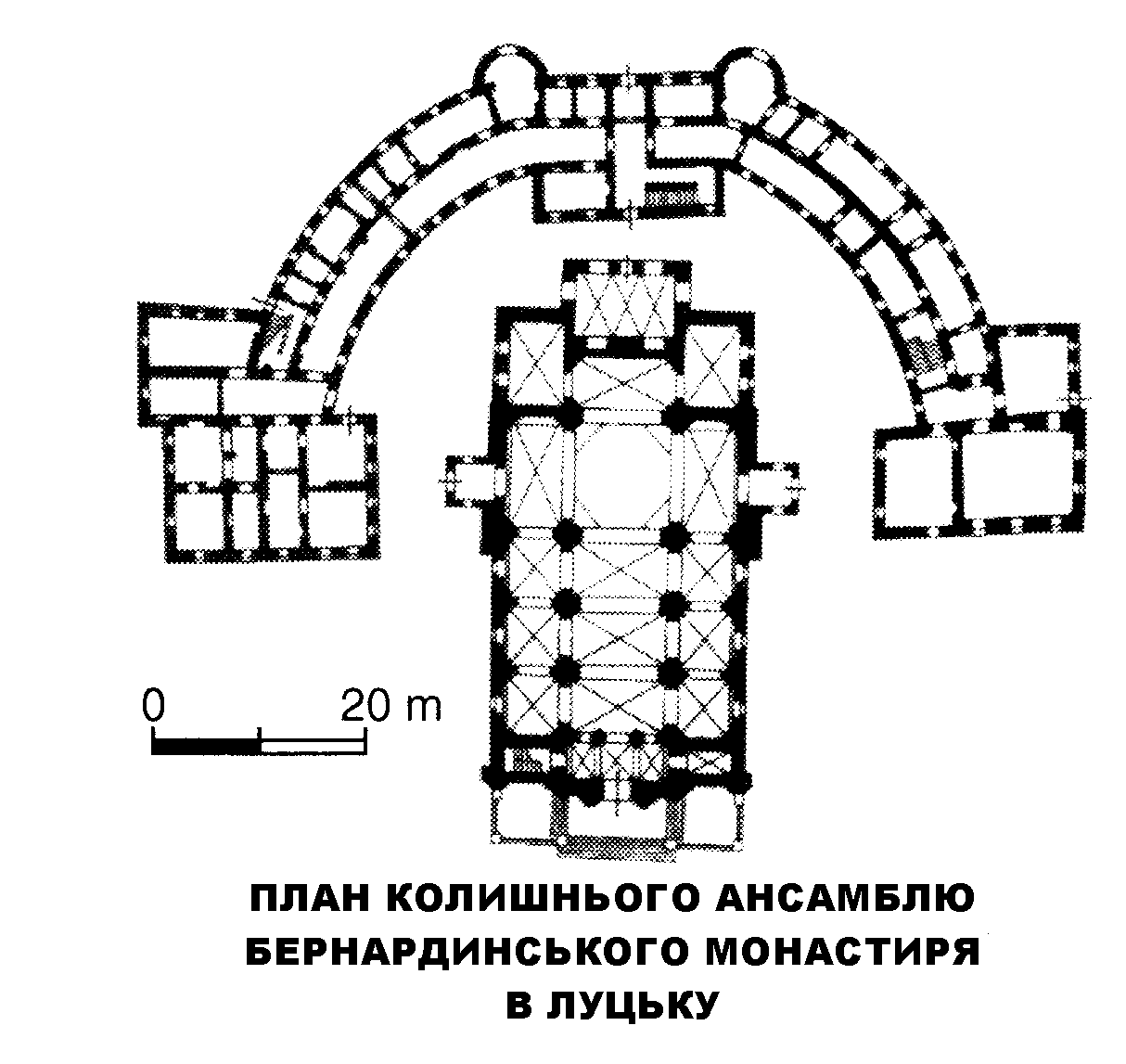
Plan

The floor plan of monastery is in the shape of a horseshoe. The church is situated at the center. The transept of the church is located at the centre of the curve in the horseshoe semicircle. The complex consisting of the church and monastery represents a combination of Baroque and Classicist styles. The church had a typically Jesuit appearance before it was reconstructed in the Orthodox style. The bell tower and the central dome rise above the roof. The main facade consists of decorated pilasters.

Eight small altars are set near the columns which separate the three naves. The walls and ceiling are decorated with bright painted icons. The interior is generally in the Orthodox style although it has a few Catholic features. A gilded oak iconostasis decorates the altar in a pseudo-Russian style. The royal doors consist of two carved sections.

== Gallery ==
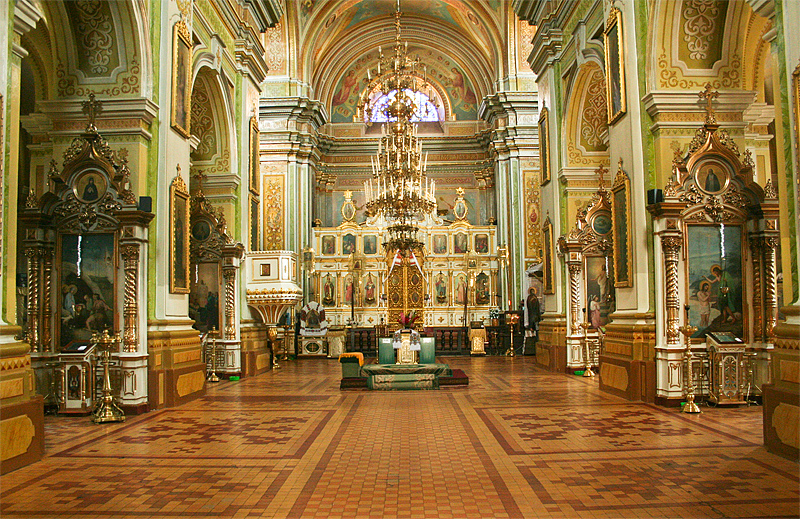
Interior

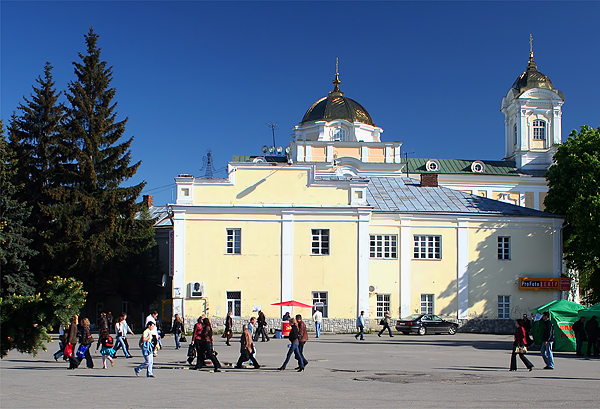
Former monastery

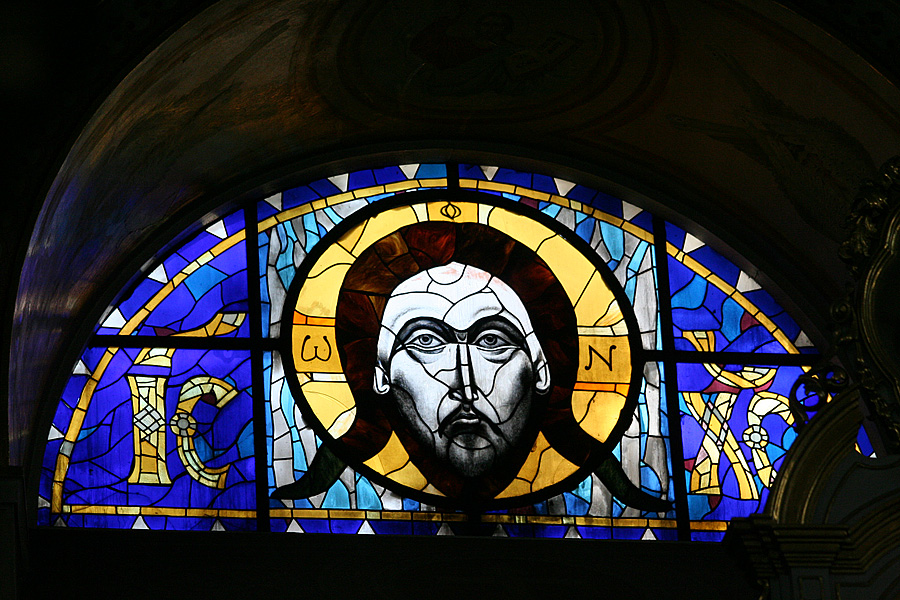
Stained glass

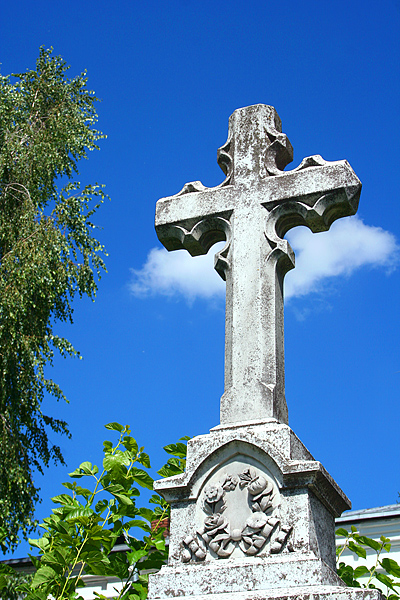
Cross

== Sources ==
- Колосок Б. В. Римо-католицькі святині Луцька. — К, 2004 ISBN 966-575-107-7
- Mieczysław Orłowicz. Ilustrowany przewodnik po Wołyniu. Łuck 1929
- Терський С. Історія Луцька. Том 1. Лучеськ Х—XV ст. — Львів, 2006 ISBN 978-966-553-660-4
