= Lesya Ukrainka street, Lutsk =

Street in Lutsk, Ukraine

Coordinates: 50°44′38″N 25°19′17″E

Lesya Ukrainka street
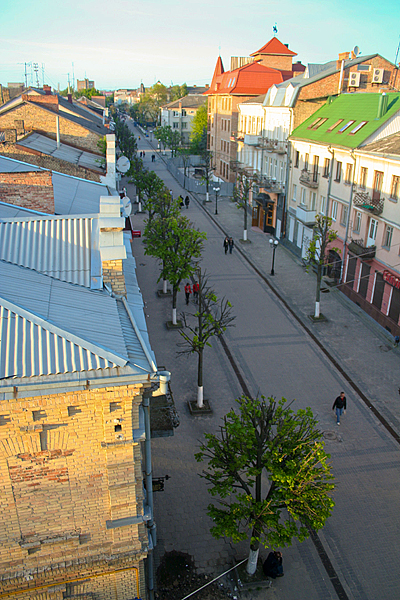
- Length: 730 m (2,400 ft)
- Postal code: 43016, 43025

Lesya Ukrainka street (formerly known as Jagiellońska - Jagiellon street) is a central pedestrian street in Lutsk, Ukraine, running from Fellowship Bridge Square to the city's central Theatre Square. The street is 730 metres long, and is the main street of the northern and eastern areas of the Glushets suburb of Lutsk. There have been at least ten churches and monasteries located on the street. The street began to develop with more intensity during the eighteenth century when the city began to extend along the street's path. It became the main street in the city in the early 19th century. In the 1980s, it became a pedestrian-only street. The street was renamed to Lesya Ukrainka in the 1990s. Lesya Ukrainska has many architectural landmarks and has become an important trade artery of the city.

== History ==
The street was formed in the 12th century due to the presence of Saint Mary Monastery granted by Mstislav I of Kiev. Running over hills, it was separated by the river Glushets from the island containing the central city. The Prince of Volhyn, Vasilko Romanovich, founded the monastery of Saint Basil on a neighboring hill in the 13th century.

These hills were known as Pomostychi and were surrounded by strong defensive constructions. The terrain of these hills was advantageous for both economical and defensive purposes making it a suitable place to build churches and monasteries. In the 15th century, it is likely that many churches were built along the main road. By the 16th century, there were eight churches and monasteries. The Bernardine monastery was built nearby.

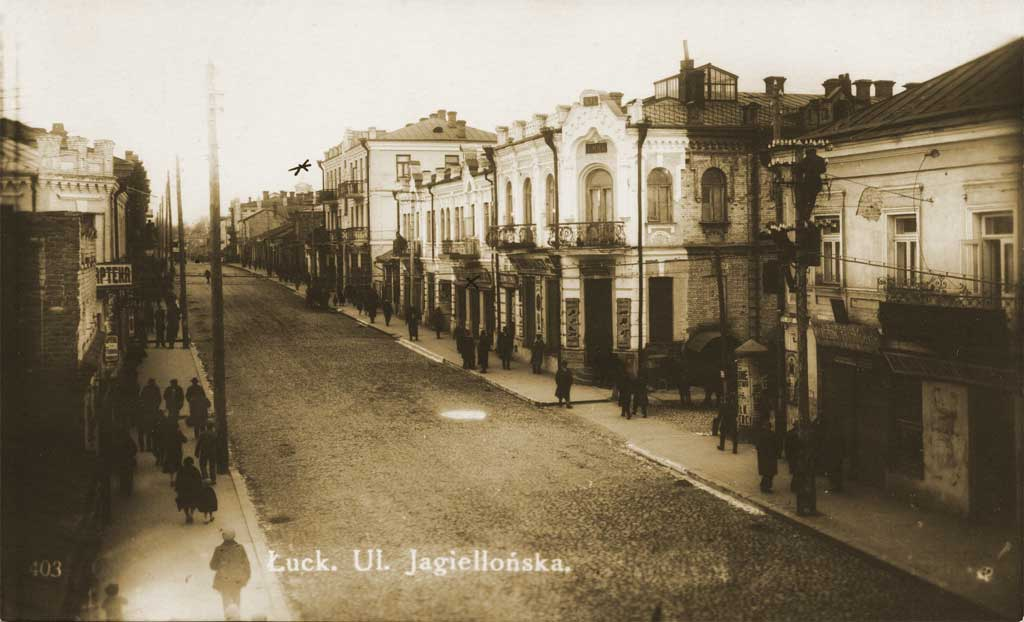
Post card - Jagiellon street

The street began to develop rapidly in the second half of the 19th century. It became very important and prestigious because it was a part of the Kyiv-Brest highway that crossed through the city in the 1860s. The street was paved with cobblestones at that time and, although it was renamed to Highway street, it kept many of the same public institutions. The North side of the street was dominated by the imposing presence of the circus and amusement rides. The first public city park was created near Trinitarian monastery in the 1870s. There were 2 electric theatres opposite the park - Modern and Renaissance.

At the end of the 19th century, there was progress in improving the street's architectural coherence. Many buildings were built in a brick nonplastering style characterized by a special kind of decoration using colored, figured bricks, usually yellow and red. The Cornices of every building, crowded by attics, had original ornaments and facades were decorated by alabaster relief ornaments and forged details such as balcony grating, flowerpots, shelters, fences, railings etc. In 1894 the Lutsk Orthodox Fellowship granted the construction of the Iverian chapel near the street. A Granite-bronze statue of Alexander III of Russia was built behind the church. At that time, the wealthy Jewish Kronshtein family constructed several buildings with magnificent architecture in Italian Renaissance and Russian styles. The street had become a kind of open-air museum representing modern, eclectic, brick-style buildings.

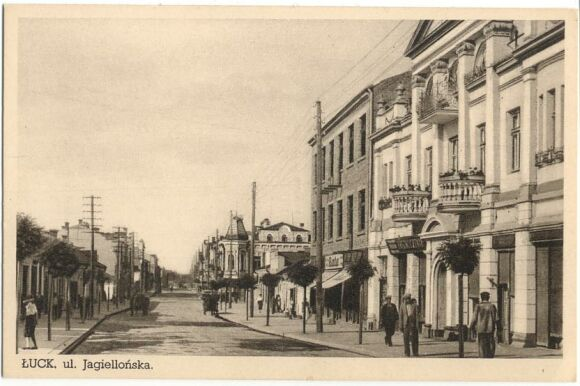
Post card from 1920s - Jagiellon street.

In 1920–1939, when the town was part of Poland, the street was called Jagiellon street. Half of the buildings on the street were destroyed following the invasion of Poland. After World War II, it was renamed Soviet street. Smaller shops joined together and building façades were reconstructed to make big shop windows. The street changed shape again during post-war reconstruction. Poor planning controls in the 1970s and 1980s had a negative impact on the vitality and presentation of Soviet street. Inappropriate reconstruction and design of the new buildings led to the demolition of historic properties. Brick-style façades were plastered over and many architectural details were destroyed in spite of their landmark status. The street was renamed to Lesya Ukrainka in the 1990s.

== Current status ==
Currently, Lesya Ukrainka street is the central pedestrian street running from the square Fellowship Bridge to Central Theatre square and is one of the city's most crowded streets. The street's architecture is generally rooted in the 19th - first half of the 20th century, though Soviet-era buildings do remain. Landmark buildings on Lesya Ukrainka Street include numbers 2, 5, 13, 32, 53 and 61. There are many shops and restaurants on the street. There are also 2 garden squares on the street and the landmark Trinitarian monastery.

== Buildings ==
Number	Description	Photo
2	Kronshtein house, built in 1890–1894. Reconstructed in 1928.	
5	The oldest brick-style house in the street. Was built in the early 19th century. Restored.	
13	Example of façade decoration in the late 19th century.	
32	Art Nouveau house constructed in 1920s.	
53	Corner house built in the early 20th century.	
61	Eclectic house.	

== Gallery ==
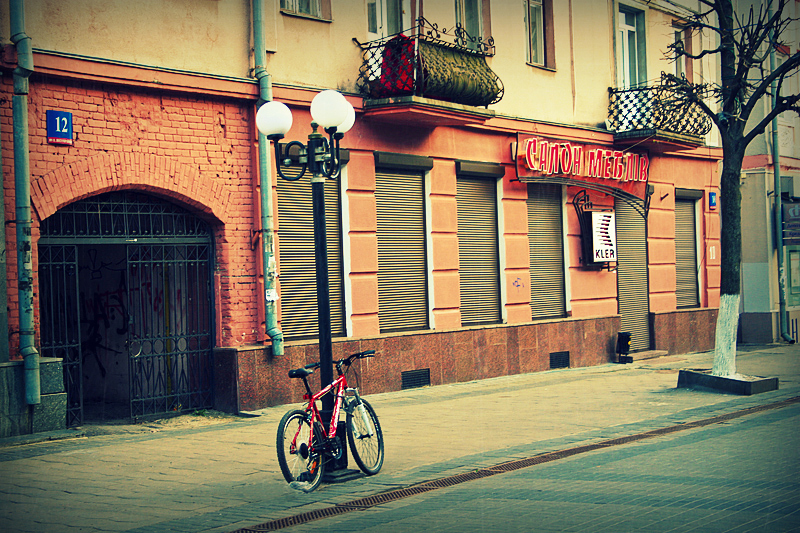
Street

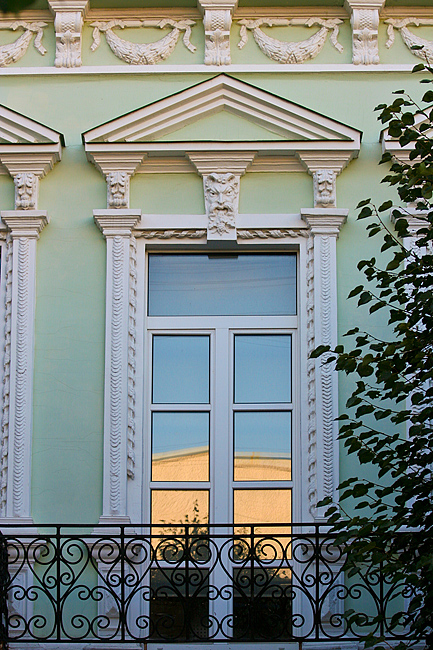
Fragment of facade

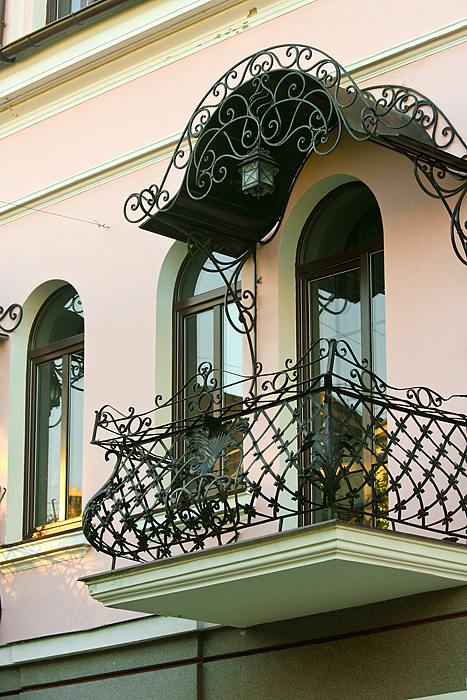
Balcony

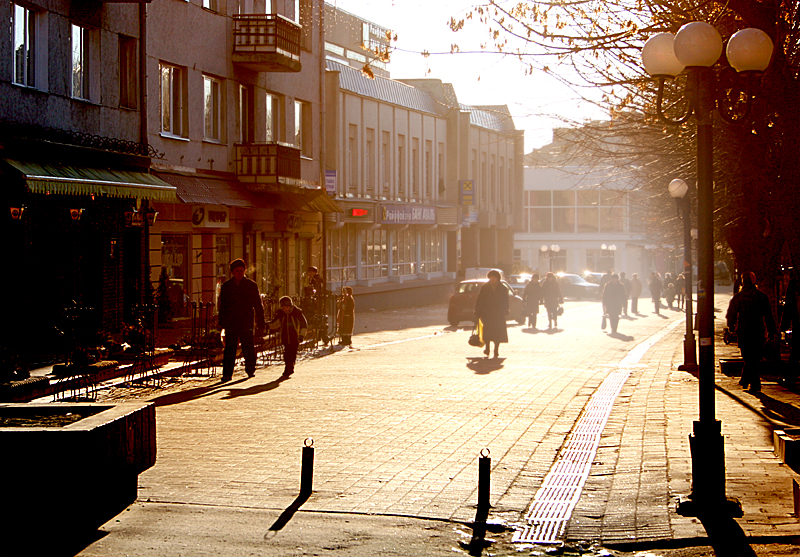
Street

== Sources ==
- В.Пясецький, Ф.Мандзюк. Вулиці і майдани Луцька. — Луцьк, 2005 ISBN 966-361-050-6
- Adam Wojnicz. Łuck na Wołyniu, — Łuck, 1922 — s.29
- Луцьк. Архітектурно-історичний нарис. Б.Колосок, Р.Метельницький — Київ, 1990. — с.118
