= Lubart's Castle =

14th-century castle in Lutsk, Ukraine

Lutsk Castle
- Lutsk, Ukraine
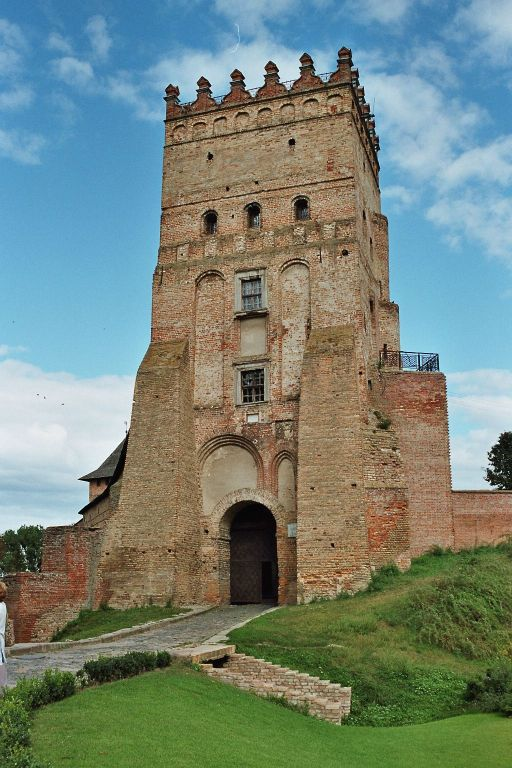
- Lubart Tower – main gate of the Lutsk Castle

Site information
- Type: Castle

Location
- Coordinates: 50°44′20″N 25°19′23″E

Site history
- Built: 14th century
- Built by: Liubartas

Garrison information
- Designations

Immovable Monument of National Significance of Ukraine
- Official name: Замок (Castle)
- Type: Architecture
- Reference no.: 030106

Lutsk Castle (Ukrainian: Луцький замок, romanized: Lutskyi zamok; Polish: Zamek w Łucku), also locally known as Liubart's Castle (Lithuanian: Liubarto pilis; Ukrainian: Замок Любарта, romanized: Zamok Liubarta) or Upper Castle (Lithuanian: Lucko aukštutinė pilis; Ukrainian: Верхній замок, romanized: Verkhnii zamok), began its life in the mid-14th century as the fortified seat of Gediminas' son Liubartas (Lubart), the last ruler of united Galicia-Volhynia. It is the most prominent landmark of Lutsk, Ukraine and as such appears on the 200 hryvnia bill. (Another city castle, called Lower Castle, built by the Czartoryski family since the 14th century, is now a ruin).

== History ==
The Kievan Rus' town of Luchesk had a wooden wall as early as 1075, when Boleslaus the Bold laid siege to it for six months. Yury Dolgoruky failed to take Lutsk after a six-week siege in 1149. In 1255, the walls of Lutsk were stormed by Khan Jochi's grandson Kuremsa.

The current castle, towering over the Styr River, was built mostly in the 1340s, although some parts of the earlier walls were used. It repelled sieges by numerous potentates, including Casimir the Great (1349), Jogaila (1431), and Sigismund Kęstutaitis (1436). In addition to the Lithuanian nobles gathered there with the Supreme Duke of Lithuania Władysław II Jagiełło and the Grand Duke Vytautas, the Congress was attended by the Holy Roman Emperor Sigismund; the Grand Prince of Moscow Vasily II; and the Voivode Dan II of Wallachia.

During the long reign of Vytautas, Lutsk Castle was further fortified to guard against artillery and gunfire. The principal entrance, now bricked in, was from the west and adjoined a bridge over outer moat. Three main towers, now named "Lubart", "Švitrigaila" (both after Lithuanian princes) and the "Bishop", were built up in the course of the 16th and 17th centuries.

The walls of the castle formerly enclosed St. John's Cathedral, a palace of the grand dukes, and an episcopal palace. Of these buildings, only the Neoclassical palace of the bishops still stands.

During the 1940s Lubart’s Castle became a Nazi execution site of over 4000 Jews. One photograph, taken June 18, 1941, shows a large group of Jewish men sitting under German guard in front of Lubart’s Castle in Lutsk guarded by German soldiers. Only weeks prior several massacres had taken place at this same place. On July 2, 1941 1,160 Jews were murdered within the walls of the castle. There is no monument or marker for this tragedy in the castle. On July 4, 3,000 more Jews were executed by gunshot here.

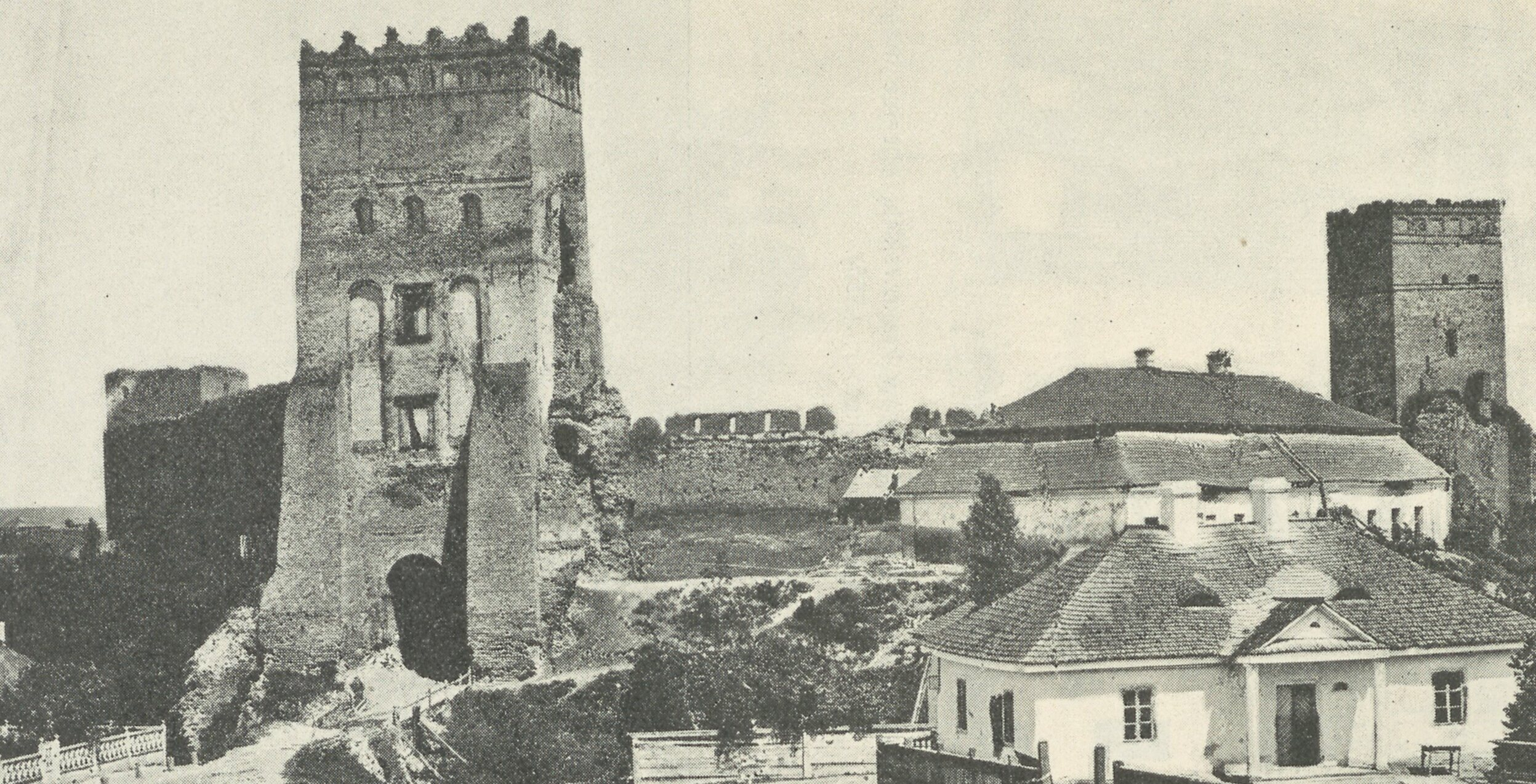
View of the castle circa 1916

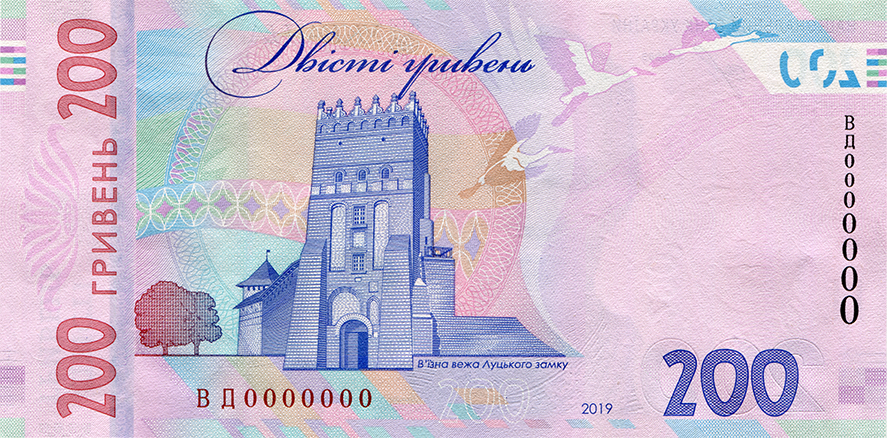
The castle tower on the reverse of 200 hryvnias banknote
