= Joseph Zinker =

Jewish-American therapist (b. 1934)

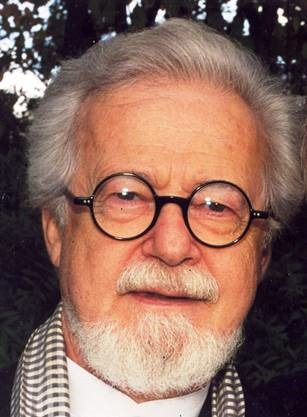

Joseph Chaim Zinker is a therapist who has contributed to the growth and development of Gestalt theory and also Gestalt methodology. He co-founded the Gestalt Institute of Cleveland.

== Early life ==
Joseph Zinker was born in Central Europe (Łuck) in 1934 in a Jewish family. He was raised in Poland.

He lost part of his family during Second World War and lived with his parents in refugee camps in Austria and Germany. In 1949, they came to New York. When Joseph Zinker was young, he spoke Russian, Polish, English, Yiddish, some German and a little Hebrew.

== Education and work ==
Joseph Zinker started his studies in Russian Literature, Psychology, Philosophy and Art at Queens College and New York University. Then he earned a Master of Science and a Ph.D. in Clinical Psychology at Case Western Reserve University in Cleveland (in 1963). His doctoral dissertation, Rosa Lee: Motivation and the Crisis of Dying (1966) became his first publication.

In the 1960s, he trained with Fritz Perls, a German-born who was one of the founders of Gestalt therapy, and other psychiatrists and psychotherapists. He became a Gestalt therapist and was a co-founder of the Gestalt Institute of Cleveland, where he spent many years as a member of the teaching faculty, the head of the postgraduate faculty, and as a member of the Center for the Study of Intimate Systems. Together with Sonia Nevis, he headed this center which has taken a role in the application of the Gestalt model to work with families and couples.

In the 1970s, Miriam Polster, Bill Warner and Joseph Zinker developed Gestalt theory with the formulation of the contact cycle and also the awareness-excitement-contact cycle. Joseph Zinker is known for refining the clinical concepts of complementarity and middle ground in couple work and for the application of Gestalt therapy. He helped grow the principles of Gestalt group process and the place of the Gestalt experiment in therapeutic work.

In 1980, Zinker continued to develop the cycle of experience: he applied it to groups and group development. With his wife, Gestalt therapist Sandra Cardosa-Zinker, he published several articles about couples therapy.

As a Gestalt therapist, he has a private practice since 1962. He's also a teacher of therapists, a painter and a sculptor.

== Books ==
Joseph Zinker is the author of several books like Creative Process in Gestalt Therapy, In Search of Good Form, Motivation and the Crisis of Dying, Sketches... He has also published numerous articles in journals (about psychotherapy, arts, the phenomenology of love...) and has served on the editorial board of different journals.

Creative Process in Gestalt Therapy was judged "Book of the year" by the magazine Psychology Today in 1977. It is now a classic, and a best-seller. It has been translated into several languages.
