= David Carbonara =

American film and TV composer

David Carbonara is an American film and TV composer. He is best known for his work on the critically acclaimed TV series Mad Men. His other television shows include Vegas, The Romanoffs, the mini series The Secret Life of Marilyn Monroe, as well as producing original songs for the period drama The Last Tycoon. His film work includes David O. Russell's Spanking the Monkey, Amos Kollek's Fast Food Fast Women and the award-winning Amélia, by Brazilian director Ana Carolina.

He has collaborated with several composers, including Rachel Portman, Michel Legrand and Howard Shore.

== Biography ==
Born to a musical family in Bridgewater, Massachusetts, Carbonara began playing the trombone at age 9.

In the eighth grade, he was invited to join a rehearsal big band at Bridgewater State College composed of students and faculty members from Berklee College of Music, New England Conservatory and other professional area musicians. The band included drummer Steve Smith, now famous for his work in the band Journey.

In the 1970s Carbonara started playing night clubs with his brothers, John Carbonara, now a music editor, and Stephen Carbonara, who founded the American School of Modern Music in Paris, France.

== Education ==
After several years playing in bands, Carbonara returned to Berklee College of Music in 1983. Unsure which direction to head, Carbonara chose to pursue a film scoring major, not because he wanted to score movies or even loved film music, but because it was a major that allowed him to take classes in a variety of disciplines.

== Mad Men ==
In 2001, Matthew Weiner sent Carbonara the pilot script to Mad Men, but it was not until 2006 that the pilot was shot, and season 1 aired starting in July 2007. Along with scoring all 7 seasons of Mad Men, Carbonara was asked to produce songs that appeared as performances in the show, the first being "Babylon" from the same titled episode in season 1.

Other productions were "The Best Thing in Life Are Free" by Robert Morse, Jessica Pare's "Zou Bisou Bisou" along with the released instrumentals such as "Song of India" and "Moonglow".

== Mad Men live shows ==
On the stage he created a cabaret/variety show called "The Mad Men Live Revue", which featured cast members performing songs from the era, and was staged at Los Angeles's El Rey Theatre for one night only, Oct, 21, 2008. It had a reprise, in a much larger venue in Las Vegas, as "A Night on the Town with Mad Men" at The Hollywood Theater in The MGM Grand Hotel on Jan. 27th, 2009. Two years later, on Nov. 18, 2011 Carbonara conducted a suite of his Mad Men music at Carnegie Hall with The New York Pops in an evening called "Cocktail Hour: Music of the 'Mad Men' Era" featuring singer Cheyenne Jackson, and under the musical direction of Pop's conductor Steven Reineke.

== Later work ==
In 2012, Carbonara began work on the pilot to CBS's Vegas, which was directed by James Mangold who had worked with Carbonara previously as the music editor on his film, Cop Land. Carbonara scored all 21 episodes for the 2012–2013 season, while working on the sixth season of Mad Men, and beginning work on Matthew Weiner's independent film, Are You Here. After Mad Men he continued in the period genre of composing with Lifetime's The Secret Life of Marilyn Monroe, and went on to produce 1930s songs for Amazon's period drama The Last Tycoon. And in 2018, once again for Amazon scored two episodes of Matthew Weiner's anthology series The Romanoffs.

== Selected filmography ==
=== Music editor ===
- The Mambo Kings (1992)
- The Last Good Time (1994)
- Oleanna (1994)
- Trees Lounge (1996)
- Copland (1997)
- Madeline (1998)
- Wide Awake (1998)
- The Cider House Rules (1999)
- The Winslow Boy (1999)
- Joe Gould's Secret (2000)
- Chocolat (2000)
- The Truth About Charlie (2002)
- An Unfinished Life (2005)

=== Film composer ===
- Spanking The Monkey (1994)
- Fast Food, Fast Women (2000)
- Queenie In Love (2001)
- Amélia (2001)
- The Guru (2002)
- Glickman (2013)
- Are You Here (2013)
- Giuliani Time (2005)
- The Congressman (2016)

=== TV composer ===
- Vegas (2012–2013)
- Mad Men (2007–2015)
- The Secret Life of Marilyn Monroe (2015)
- The Romanoffs (2018)

=== Music producer ===
- Mad Men (2007–2015)
- The Last Tycoon (2016–2017)
