= Angelica Page =

American actress, director and writer (born 1964)

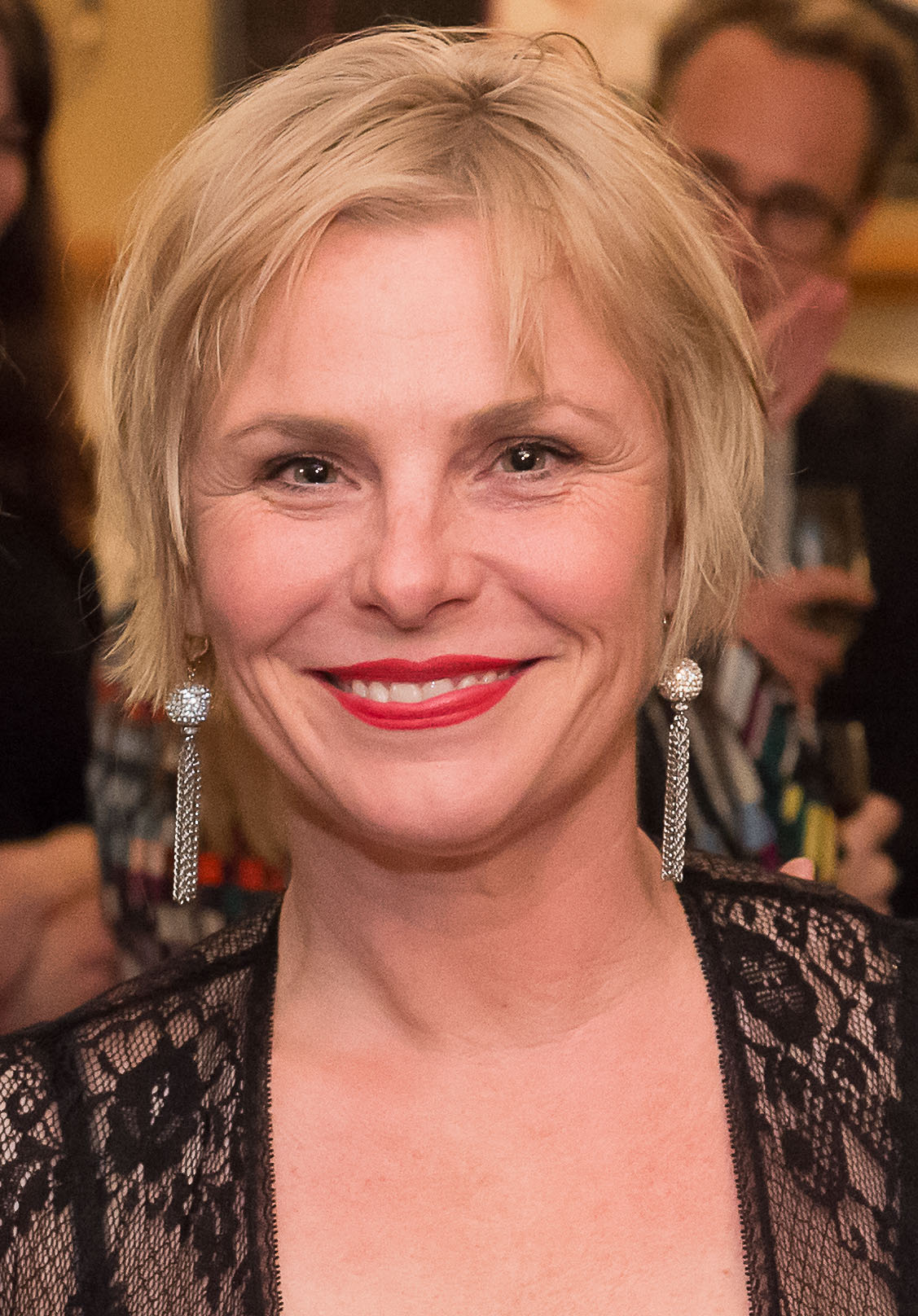
- Page in 2015
- Born: Angelica Torn; February 17, 1964 (age 62); New York City, U.S.
- Occupations: Actress, director, producer, writer
- Years active: 1993–present
- Spouses: Keith William Burkhardt (m. 1984; div. 1992) Tim Williams (m. 1998; div. 2001) Dmitry Lipkin (m. 2017)
- Children: 2
- Parents: Rip Torn; Geraldine Page

Angelica Page (née Angelica Torn; February 17, 1964) is an American actress, director, producer and screenwriter. She is the only daughter of the actors Rip Torn and Geraldine Page. Credited as Angelica Torn in her early career, she legally and professionally changed her name to Angelica Page in September 2011.

Page began her career in the 1993 Broadway revival of Anna Christie, and made her feature film debut in Nobody's Fool (1994). In 1998, she starred in a Broadway production of Side Man, which earned her a Helen Hayes Award for Best Actress. She subsequently appeared in the films The Sixth Sense (1999), and the political drama The Contender (2000).

She continued to appear Off-Broadway throughout the 2000s, returning to Broadway with a supporting part in a 2012 revival of The Best Man. In 2015, she starred as her mother, Geraldine Page, in the touring stage production Turning Page, a biographical play which she also wrote. Additional film credits include Michael Imperioli's The Hungry Ghosts (2009), and the thriller Never Here (2017).

== Early life ==
Page was born Angelica Torn on February 17, 1964, to actors Rip Torn and Geraldine Page. She was raised in New York City, and has noted that her parents' marriage was turbulent and marked by frequent fighting. Though she was encouraged by her mother to act, Page described herself as a "shy child" and was resistant to pursuing it. Page attended the Bank Street School for Children in Manhattan.

After her mother's death in 1987, Page began exploring acting as a career option, as it had been her mother's "dying wish". She commented: "My mother died before she ever had a chance to see me realize this dream that she apparently had for me, but never spoke of. She wanted me to make my own decisions, but then at the end when she realized she didn't have any time left, she made me promise." Page studied acting at the William Esper Studio and HB Studio.

== Career ==
Page's first professional role was on Broadway as an understudy in the 1993 revival of Eugene O'Neill's Anna Christie. She subsequently made her feature film debut in Nobody's Fool (1994), and appeared in several independent films before having a supporting role in M. Night Shyamalan's The Sixth Sense (1999). Also in 2000, she had a supporting role in Amos Kollek's Fast Food Fast Women (2000), and in the Academy Award-nominated political drama The Contender (2000). The following year, she had a supporting role as Patty opposite John Travolta in the thriller Domestic Disturbance (2001).

On stage, Page received the Helen Hayes Award (Best Actress 2000) for her work in the Tony Award-winning Side Man at the Kennedy Center. This followed closely after being honored with the New York People's Choice Award in the Best Supporting Actress category (1999) for her portrayal of Patsy, a role she originated for the same production.

Nominated for her second Helen Hayes Award (Best Actress 2010) for her portrayal of Ivy Weston in the Pulitzer Prize- and Tony Award-winning August: Osage County (Broadway and National Tour), her performance was heralded as "revelatory" by the Chicago Tribune. On television, she appeared as Julia Brinn in Law & Order: Special Victims Unit (2005); other television credits include Law & Order: Criminal Intent, The Sopranos, 100 Centre Street, and As the World Turns. In 2009, she had a supporting role in the Michael Imperioli-directed drama The Hungry Ghosts.

In 2015, Page developed the one-woman show Turning Page, a biographical play in which she portrayed her mother. The production opened in Los Angeles before touring nationally, and Charles McNulty of the Los Angeles Times praised it, writing: "For those who have been touched by Page's sorcery—and I personally don't know any great actor who hasn't been—Angelica's virtuosic conjuring of her mother's spirit is something to behold." The production continued to tour into 2017.

== Personal life ==
Page married Keith William Burkhardt in 1984, and with him gave birth to a son and a daughter. The couple divorced in 1992.

She subsequently married actor Tim Williams in 1998 after the two had met while performing in a 1996 stage production titled Strangers in the Land of Canaan, directed by her father. The marriage ended in divorce in 2001.

She married television creator Dmitry Lipkin (FX, HBO) in 2017 in a private ceremony at Soniat House in New Orleans.

She has commented that she had a loving yet combative relationship with her father, stating: "He's a worthy adversary. He's a very strong personality. He's an amazing person, an amazing father, but sometimes there are certain things we don't see eye to eye on. I call him on it and we fight, just like anybody else."

== Filmography ==
=== Film ===
Year	Title	Role	Notes
1994	Nobody's Fool	Ruby	Credited as Angelica Torn
1996	The Mouse	Mary Lou Strauss	Credited as Angelica Torn
1998	Wrestling with Alligators	Ruby	Credited as Angelica Torn
1999	Side Man	Patsy	Credited as Angelica Torn
1999	The Sixth Sense	Mrs. Collins	Credited as Angelica Torn
2000	Fast Food Fast Women	Vitka	Credited as Angelica Torn
2000	The Contender	Deirdre	Credited as Angelica Torn
2000	Songs in Ordinary Time	Astrid Haddad	Television film Credited as Angelica Torn
2000	Brooklyn Sonnet	Gina	Credited as Angelica Torn
2001	Domestic Disturbance	Patty	Credited as Angelica Torn
2001	Ruby's Bucket of Blood	Betsy Dupree	Television film Credited as Angelica Torn
2002	Fairie	Morgana	Credited as Angelica Torn
2003	Music	Babe	Short film Credited as Angelika Torn
2007	Light and the Sufferer	Marilla	Credited as Angelica Torn
2007	The Grand Inquisitor	Lady Di Jesus	Short film Credited as Angelica Torn
2008	Lucky Days	Virginia	Credited as Angelica Torn
2008	Nothing but the Truth	Molly Meyers	Credited as Angelica Torn
2008	The Golden Boys	Melissa Busteed	Credited as Angelica Torn
2009	The Hungry Ghosts	Roberta	Credited as Angelica Torn
2010	Mint Julep	Deirdre	Credited as Angelica Torn
2016	'79 Parts	Frick	
2017	Never Here	Cleo Flitcraft	
2018	Bonds	Doc	
2018	The Turner Exhibit	Jeanette Turner	Short film

=== Television ===
Year	Title	Role	Notes
1995	Law & Order	Sarah Tabor	Episode: "Savages"; Credited as Angelica Torn
1997	As the World Turns	Kit	1 episode Credited as Angelica Torn
1999	The Sopranos	Woman at Party	Episode: "Denial, Anger, Acceptance"; Credited as Angelica Torn
2000	Deadline	Nurse	Episode: "Shock"; Credited as Angelica Torn
2001	100 Centre Street		Episode: "Love Stories"; Credited as Angelica Torn
2002	The Education of Max Bickford	Lindsay	Episode: "Money Changes Everything"; Credited as Angelica Torn
2002	Law & Order	Georgina Woods	Episode: "Equal Rights"; Credited as Angelica Torn
2003	Law & Order: Criminal Intent	Paula Connors	Episode: "Happy Family"; Credited as Angelica Torn
2004	Line of Fire	Angela	Episode: "Eminence Front: Part 2"; Credited as Angelica Torn
2005	Law & Order: Special Victims Unit	Julia Brinn	Episode: "Quarry"; Credited as Angelica Torn
2015	Law & Order: Special Victims Unit	Mrs. Evans	Episode: "Melancholy Pursuit"

== Stage credits ==
Year	Title	Role	Notes	Ref.
1993	Anna Christie	Marthy Owen (understudy); Anna Christopherson (understudy)	Criterion Center Stage Right	
1996	Who's Afraid of Virginia Woolf?	Honey	Regional production	
1996	Strangers in the Land of Canaan		Off-Broadway	
1998	Side Man	Patsy; Terry (replacement)	John Golden Theatre; Helen Hayes Award for Best Actress	
2000	The Vagina Monologues	Ensemble	Off-Broadway	
2003–2007	Edge	Sylvia Plath	Off-Broadway; touring production	
2009	August: Osage County	Ivy Weston	Regional production Nominated—Helen Hayes Award for Best Actress	
2011	The Radiant	Marie Curie	Regional production	
2012	Psycho Therapy	Lily	Off-Broadway	
2012	The Best Man	Catherine; Mabel Cantwell (understudy); Alice Russell (understudy / replacement)	Gerald Schoenfeld Theatre	
2014	My Old Lady	Chloe	Palm Beach Drama Works	
2015	Turning Page	Geraldine Page	Touring production	
2018	Because I Could Not Stop	Emily Dickinson	Off-Broadway	
