= Kollek =

Kollek is a surname. Notable people with the surname include:

- Amos Kollek (born 1947), Israeli film director, writer and actor
- Teddy Kollek (1911–2007), Israeli politician
