= Julep =

Julep may refer to:

- Mint julep, a mixed alcoholic drink, or cocktail, consisting primarily of bourbon (or some other spirit) and fresh mint
- Mint Julep (film)
- "One Mint Julep", a song
- Julep (company), a company that sells cosmetics
- "Julep", a song by Punch Brothers from the album The Phosphorescent Blues
- Gibeau Orange Julep, a restaurant and tourist attraction in Montreal
