= Double Edge =

Double Edge may refer to:

- Double Edge Theatre, an artist-run organization founded in 1982 by Stacy Klein
- Double Edge (1992 film), an Israeli-American thriller drama film
- American Dragons, also known as Double Edge, a 1998 action crime thriller film
