= Worlds Apart =

Worlds Apart may refer to:

== Film and television ==
=== Films ===
- Worlds Apart (1921 film), an American silent film starring Eugene O'Brien
- Worlds Apart (2008 film), a Danish film by Niels Arden Oplev
- Worlds Apart, a 2008 Israeli film by Amos Kollek, based on his novel Don't Ask Me If I Love
- Worlds Apart (2015 film), a Greek film by Christoforos Papakaliatis

=== Television ===
- Survivor: Worlds Apart, the 30th season of the US reality competition Survivor
- Worlds Apart with Oksana Boyko, a program on RT

==== Episodes ====
- "Worlds Apart" (Falling Skies)
- "Worlds Apart" (Fringe)
- "Worlds Apart" (The Outer Limits)
- "Worlds Apart" (Private Practice)
- "Worlds Apart" (Swamp Thing)
- "Worlds Apart" (Voyagers!)
- "Separate Ways (Worlds Apart)" (Dawson's Creek)

== Literature ==
- Rick and Morty: Worlds Apart, a 2021 graphic novel by Josh Trujillo
- Worlds Apart (novel), a 1983 novel by Joe Haldeman
- Worlds Apart: A Dialogue of the 1960s, a 1963 book by Owen Barfield
- Worlds Apart: Science Fiction Stories, a 2012 collection of sci-fi short stories by Sukanya Datta

== Music ==
- Worlds Apart (band), a 1990s English boy band

=== Albums ===
- Worlds Apart (Allen/Olzon album) or the title song, 2020
- Worlds Apart (...And You Will Know Us by the Trail of Dead album) or the title song, 2005
- Worlds Apart (Blackjack album), 1980
- Worlds Apart (Conquest album), 1999
- Worlds Apart (Horizon album), 2004
- Worlds Apart (Make Them Suffer album), 2017
- Worlds Apart (Saga album), 1981
- Worlds Apart (Soleil Moon album) or the title song, 2000
- Worlds Apart (Subhumans album), 1985

=== EPs ===
- Worlds Apart (Betty Who EP), 2014
- Worlds Apart, a 2005 EP by The Go-Betweens
- Worlds Apart (Seven Lions EP) or the title song, 2014

=== Songs ===
- "Worlds Apart" (Jude Cole song), 1992
- "Worlds Apart" (Vince Gill song), 1996
- "Separate Ways (Worlds Apart)", by Journey from Frontiers, 1983
- "Worlds Apart", by Bruce Springsteen from The Rising, 2002
- "Worlds Apart", by Cock Robin from First Love / Last Rites, 1989
- "Worlds Apart", by Go Comet!, a side project of Ilan Kidron, 2014
- "Worlds Apart", by Jars of Clay from Jars of Clay, 1995
- "Worlds Apart", by Silverstein from Arrivals & Departures, 2007
- "Worlds Apart", by the Sinceros from The Sound of Sunbathing, 1979

== Video games ==
- Doctor Who: Worlds Apart, a 2021 blockchain digital collectible card game based on the science-fiction series Doctor Who

== See also ==
- Worlds Away (disambiguation)
