= Lutsk Ghetto =

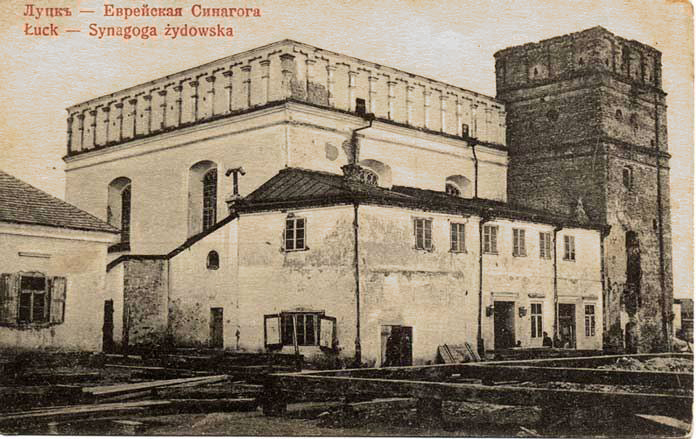
- Great Synagogue, Lutsk before its virtual destruction in World War II

- Lutsk location during the Holocaust

- Lutsk in modern-day Ukraine
- Location: Lutsk, Western Ukraine; 50.45°N 25.20°E
- Incident type: Imprisonment, slave labor, mass killings
- Organizations: SS, Einsatzgruppe C, Ukrainian Auxiliary Police, Wehrmacht
- Executions: Górka Połonka (see map)
- Victims: 25,600 Jews

The Lutsk Ghetto (Polish: getto w Łucku, German: Ghetto Luzk) was a Nazi ghetto established in 1941 by the SS in Lutsk, Western Ukraine, during World War II. In the interwar period, the city was known as Łuck and was part of the Wołyń Voivodeship (1921–1939) in the Second Polish Republic.

== Background ==
Łuck was in the eastern part of Poland throughout the interwar period. According to the Polish census of 1931, Jews constituted 48.5% of the Łuck's diverse multicultural population of 35,550 people. Łuck had the largest Jewish community in the province. The secret annex to the Molotov–Ribbentrop Pact meant that during the Nazi-Soviet invasion of Poland in 1939 Łuck was conquered and occupied by the Red Army. The region was Sovietized in an atmosphere of terror. Political, communal and cultural institutions were shut down, and Jewish community leaders were arrested by the NKVD. In June 1940 the Soviet secret police uncovered the Zionist "Gordonia" organization and imprisoned its leaders. Polish-Jewish families who fled to Łuck from western Poland ahead of the Nazis were rounded up and deported to the Soviet interior, along with train-loads of dispossessed Christian Poles. Some 10,000 people were sent in cattle trains to Siberia in four waves of deportations from Łuck county beginning in February, April and June 1940.

== NKVD prisoner massacre ==
The German Wehrmacht invaded the Soviet Union on June 22, 1941, in Operation Barbarossa. Many young Jews left Łuck with the retreating Red Army, but very few Jewish families followed them. The escaping NKVD, responsible for political prisons, purported to offer amnesty to the inmates of the Łuck prison and in the morning of June 23 ordered them to exit the building to the courtyards en masse. The gates were locked, and all prisoners were mowed down by heavy machine guns and grenades thrown from prison windows; 2,000 people died on the spot. A small group of survivors was forced by the NKVD to bury the bodies over the next two days, in five mass graves. In total, some 4,000 captives including Poles, Jews and Ukrainians were murdered by the Soviet secret police before their withdrawal.

The Germans rolled into the city on June 26, 1941. They overlooked the Soviet killings of Poles and Jews. But the killings of Ukrainians were documented, and, by the Nazi ideology of Judeo-Bolshevism, the Jews were to be held responsible for what the Soviets did. The Ukrainian People's Militia vented their rage by organizing a pogrom. The Synagogue along with the Jewish homes were set on fire. The Nazi's wave of mass executions began a week later. A mobile killing squad, Einsatzgruppe C's Einsatzkommando 4a, assisted by an infantry platoon, massacred 1,160 Jews on July 2. On July 4, 1941 at Lubart's Castle 3,000 Jews were shot and killed by heavy machine gun fire. Overall, some 2,000 Polish Jews were murdered by the SS-Sonderkommando 4a alone, as reprisal for the NKVD killings of Ukrainians (9.2 percent of population in 1931), even though Polish Jews had nothing to do with the Soviet atrocities.

== Ghetto history ==
The draconian restrictions on Jews were imposed in August 1941. In October, a group of 500 Jewish carpenters and craftsmen (including 50 seamstresses) were moved to a new forced labour camp set up in the Jewish school building. Four soldiers from the SS-Sonderkommando Dirlewanger were sent there as sentries and one of them, SS-Oberscharführer Heinz Feiertag become the camp's first commandant. He personally fenced off the area and brought in the Jews from the ghetto to work as forced labors. The camp produced items such as: shoe polish, floor polish, soaps and brushes. A tailor's workshop was also set up in the camp.In just 2.5 months, the camp brought in a net income of 25,000 marks before the facility was taken over by the civilian administration. During a postwar proceeding, a Jewish witness who was one of the workers in the camp described Feiertag's criminal activities in the camp:

"Feiertag visited the workshop several times a day. Not a day went by without him beating one of the workers. I remember exactly how once in the shoemakers’ workshop a pair of boots was made upon his order. Feiertag was very pleased with them. As proof of his delight, he commanded the foreman, the Jew Wydra, to be given 15–20 blows of the stick. Feiertag knew perfectly how to torment prisoners. There was no day that somebody did not get a thrashing. For the beatings, a stick was used on the naked body. Two SS men would carry out the beatings. They reveled in [torturing] the victim all day long. They called him [the prisoner] names, ordered him about, made him sing songs, and then they had him undress completely [and] dig himself a grave in the camp yard. The torture lasted several hours. In the end, they shot him."

The Łuck Ghetto was established by the German occupation authorities in December 1941, and sealed from the outside with the provision of only starvation food rations. The ghetto population was about 20,000 people. The newly formed Judenrat, a council of Jewish leaders for the ghetto, made every effort to feed the hungry and control epidemics. The Jewish Ghetto Police was also organized by the Judenrat.

=== Jewish uprising and the ghetto liquidation ===
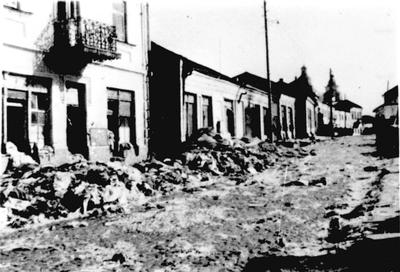
Ghetto street in Łuck following extermination of Jews, 1942

The fate of ghettoised Jews across occupied Poland was sealed at Wannsee in early 1942, when the Final Solution was set in motion. The first large-scale aktion in the Łuck Ghetto took place on August 19, 1942. About 17,000 Jews were rounded up by Nazi Order Police battalions and the Ukrainian Auxiliary Police during a four-day period, assembled at the square by the pharmacy, and taken in lorries along with women and children, to the Górka Połonka forest, on the outskirts of Łuck (see map). They were shot into the prepared trenches. During the deportations, the small ghetto in Hnidawa (Gnidawa) was also emptied. A few families survived in the pharmacy cellars, including eyewitness Shmuel Shilo (age thirteen), along with his mother and brothers; Shmuel's sister was rescued by the Poles. Meanwhile, the labor camp remained in operation for a few more months. The main ghetto ceased to exist; Jews who were still alive were relocated back to the small ghetto in Gnidawa. They were rounded up on September 12 and marched to Lubart's Castle; from there, they were to Połonka and murdered. Young Shmuel Shilo survived again, but all alone this time; he hid under a floor plank in the castle for two nights.

In the final extermination phase of Operation Reinhard, on December 12, 1942 the German and Ukrainian police entered the camp building of the former Jewish school to conduct the liquidation of the SS enterprise. The Jews barricaded themselves inside determined to die in combat. They did not have guns; they had axes, pickaxes, factory tools and bottles of acid. The siege lasted for the entire day. The Germans used artillery to suppress the resistance. Towards the evening, the police forces set the building ablaze, and machine-gunned any escaping prisoners. The rare eyewitness, Shmuel Shilo who found refuge with the insurgents, survived again, this time by hiding beneath a work bench; he jumped out the window under the cover of night. The revolt took place in the depth of winter, four months before the Warsaw Ghetto Uprising of April 1943. The Łuck Ghetto was liquidated entirely through the Holocaust by bullets (as opposed to the Holocaust by gas). In total, more than 25,600 people were executed at point-blank range at Połonka, men, women and children. Several participants of the rebellion escaped to freedom.

=== End of World War II ===
The Red Army rolled into the city on February 2, 1944. Only about 150 Jews emerged from hiding, including families of Dr. Faiwel Goldstein, Dr. Schneiberg and Dr. Marek Rubinstein rescued by the Catholic families of Strusińskis, and Ostrowskis, Polish Righteous Among the Nations from Łuck and nearby farm in Kroszowiec respectively. Zygmunt Strusiński received his Righteous medal posthumously, murdered for saving Jews in winter 1943. His wife Wiktoria, expelled from USSR along with all Poles in 1945, corresponded with the survivors from Israel for decades to come. She did not sell any of the jewellery given by Jews in hiding to buy food for them, and gave it back with a sense of pride during a visit in 1963.

Following World War II, at the insistence of Joseph Stalin during Tehran Conference confirmed (as not negotiable) at the Yalta Conference of 1945, Poland's borders were redrawn and Łuck – then again, Lutsk (Cyrillic: Луцьк) – was incorporated into the Ukrainian SSR of the Soviet Union. The remaining Polish population was expelled and resettled back to new Poland before the end of 1946. The Jewish community was never restored. The USSR officially ceased to exist on 31 December 1991.

== See also ==
- Stanisławów Ghetto in occupied eastern Poland
