= Stephen McCauley =

American author (born 1955)

- Born: June 26, 1955 (age 71)
- Education: University of Vermont; University of Nice
- Occupation: Author

Stephen McCauley (born June 26, 1955) is an American author. He has written eight novels, including Insignificant Others. His best known novel is The Object of My Affection, which was made into a film starring Jennifer Aniston and Paul Rudd.

== Life and career ==
He was raised outside Boston and went to public schools for his education. As an undergraduate, he attended the University of Vermont and then spent a year in France at the University of Nice.

McCauley worked a series of unrelated jobs including teaching yoga, working at a hotel, a kindergarten, and manning an ice cream stand. He worked as a travel agent for many years before moving to Brooklyn in the 1980s. There he attended adult learning centers to take some writing classes before enrolling in Columbia University's writing program. The writer Stephen Koch gave him the idea to begin work on his first novel.

His stories, articles and reviews have appeared in Gay Community News, Bay Windows, the Boston Phoenix, the New York Times Book Review, Vogue, House & Garden, Details, Vanity Fair, Harper's, and Travel and Leisure, among others.

His first novel, The Object of My Affection, was adapted in 1998 into a Hollywood feature film with the same title starring Jennifer Aniston and Paul Rudd. A film based on his fourth, True Enough, served as the basis for a French-language film in 2007, titled La Verité ou Presque. His 1992 novel The Easy Way Out was adapted into the feature film L'Art de la fugue directed by Brice Cauvin.

McCauley is an alumnus of the Ragdale Foundation.

=== Teaching ===
Today, McCauley serves as the co-director of the Creative Writing program at Brandeis University. He is a professor of the Practice of English Fiction.

== Bibliography ==
- You Only Call When You're in Trouble: A Novel (2024) ISBN 9781250296795
- My Ex-Life (2018) ISBN 9781250122438
- Insignificant Others (2010) ISBN 0-7432-2475-2
- Alternatives To Sex (2006) ISBN 0-7432-2473-6
- True Enough (2001) ISBN 0-684-81054-9
- The Man of the House (1996) ISBN 0-684-81053-0
- The Easy Way Out (1992) ISBN 0-671-70818-X
- The Object of My Affection (1987) ISBN 0-671-61840-7
- "Let's Say" in Patrick Merla, editor, Boys Like Us: Gay Writers Tell Their Coming Out Stories, Avon Books, 1996
