= Turning Page =

Turning Page is an autobiographical one-person show which made its world premiere in 2017 at The Moth in LA before its NYC debut the same year has been closely watched during its workshop period by major critics like Charles McNulty of the Los Angeles Times who featured his review of the then staged reading on the cover of the Sunday Arts section and online McNulty wrote "For those who have been touched by Page’s sorcery — and I personally don’t know any great actor who hasn’t been — Angelica’s virtuosic conjuring of her mother’s spirit is something to behold."

The play written by Angelica Page which explores her relationship with her Oscar winning mother, the late legendary actress Geraldine Page who died in 1987.

== Development history ==
In 2012, Page began developing Turning Page, as a play in which she portrayed herself and her legendary mother at the Actors Studio in NYC with the encouragement of its president Al Pacino and under the mentorship of its Associate Artistic Director Elizabeth Kemp and acclaimed writer/biographer Patricia Bosworth who was a fellow Actors Studio board member and moderator of its Playwrights Directors Unit at the time.

== Productions ==
The play was subsequently workshopped at the Off-off-Broadway Studio at Cherry Lane Theater in New York at Circa Theatre in Wellington New Zealand and in Los Angeles at The Moth before its New York Debut at Dixon Place in 2017.

== Critical response ==
The play garnered positive attention from several media outlets, most notably from Pulitzer Prize winning critic Hilton Als of The New Yorker who called his full page piece in the Talk of the Town section of the magazine Conjuring Geraldine Page.
