= Are You Here =

- Theatrical release poster
- Directed by: Matthew Weiner
- Written by: Matthew Weiner
- Produced by: Gary Gilbert; Jordan Horowitz; Matthew Weiner; Scott Hornbacher
- Starring: Owen Wilson; Zach Galifianakis; Amy Poehler; Laura Ramsey; Jenna Fischer
- Cinematography: Chris Manley
- Edited by: Christopher Gay
- Music by: David Carbonara
- Production companies: Millennium Films; Gilbert Films; Weiner Brothers
- Distributed by: Millennium Entertainment
- Release dates: September 7, 2013 (TIFF); August 22, 2014 (United States)
- Running time: 114 minutes
- Country: United States
- Language: English
- Box office: $938,942

Are You Here (also known as You Are Here) is a 2013 American comedy-drama film written and directed by Matthew Weiner. The film stars Owen Wilson, Zach Galifianakis and Amy Poehler. The plot follows a bipolar man who inherits his estranged father’s fortune and must then battle his sister in court for it while simultaneously battling his psychological issues. The film premiered on September 7, 2013 at the Toronto International Film Festival under the title You Are Here, and released in the United States on August 22, 2014.

== Plot ==
Steve Dallas burns through his paycheck quickly every month convincing women to have sex with him. He can afford this lifestyle as he is the weatherman for local news channel WRSC. Although expected to make his own forecasts, he relies on assistant Delia Shepard to do it for him. Steve spends his free time with childhood friend Ben Baker, a bearded hippie who spends his days smoking cannabis.

One day, Ben violently bursts into the WRSC premises to tell Steve that Ben's father has died. Steve drives him to the funeral, but they arrive late due to Ben insisting they save some crayfish from ending up as bait. Despite missing all but the lowering of the casket, Ben is received with open arms by his stepmother Angela, a young special education teacher who married Ben's father just five years ago.

At the reading of the will, Angela is left nothing, in accordance with her wishes; Ben's sister Terry is left $350,000 and Ben is left the family farm, general store, and $2,000,000.

In a manic episode, Ben first decides to use his money to create a school that will spread New Age philosophy, and starts giving classes in the backyard of the family farm. He is soon stopped by Terry, who has decided to contest the will in court by challenging Ben's sanity, forcing him to have a psychiatric evaluation. On the day of the appointment, Ben runs to a neighboring Amish farm, feeling their lifestyle is a role model for his future school.

The psychiatrist concludes that, though bipolar, Ben is not a danger to himself or to others, so the court rules that Ben can keep his inheritance. Celebrating the ruling, Ben and Steve get drunk and Steve attempts to reveal to Angela that he has developed genuine feelings for her in the days since they met.

Ben has a depressive episode and starts believing life has no meaning. When Angela tries to console him, they end up having sex. The next morning, after taking his new medication, Ben shaves his beard, meets with Terry, and gives her full control of the store. Terry makes plans to tear it down and replace it with a more modern version.

Steve soon tires of the emptiness of his job and, drawn to the substance and positive influence of Angela, drives to the farm to see her. He is livid when Terry tells him Ben slept with Angela. Although Ben signs over ownership of the farm to him, Steve storms off and returns to the city to drink and smoke pot, despite having been sober for days to impress Angela.

Making good on an earlier promise, Ben moves to the town center to live a normal life. Steve, who has built much of his identity around helping Ben with his problems, has an identity crisis and realizes the error of his ways. He quits his job as a weatherman, returns to the farm, and reconciles with Ben.

Steve eventually invites Angela to stay on the farm and help him run it. She forgives him, and they begin their romance. Meanwhile, Ben is in the early stages of getting to know a neighbor—a single, friendly mother with a young son.

== Cast ==
- Owen Wilson as Steve Dallas
- Zach Galifianakis as Ben Baker
- Amy Poehler as Terry Coulter
- Laura Ramsey as Angela Baker
- Alana de la Garza as Victoria Riolobos
- Lauren Lapkus as Delia Shepard
- Paul Schulze as Dave Harken
- Greg Cromer as Kyle Robertson
- Edward Herrmann as Dr. Vincent
- Jenna Fischer as Alli
- David Selby as Karl Stevens
- Peter Bogdanovich as Judge Harlan Plath
- Melissa Rauch as Marie
- Joel Gretsch as "Red" Coulter

== Production ==
In November 2009, it was announced that Matthew Weiner would direct a movie starring Jennifer Aniston, Bradley Cooper, and Zach Galifianakis. Galifianakis remained cast in the movie but, due to scheduling conflicts, Aniston and Cooper were replaced by Amy Poehler and Owen Wilson. Filming began on May 7, 2012, in Winston-Salem, North Carolina.

== Release ==
The film premiered at the 2013 Toronto International Film Festival in September under the title You Are Here. It was selected to be screened in the Berlinale Special Galas section of the 65th Berlin International Film Festival in February 2015.

== Reception ==
On Rotten Tomatoes the film has an approval rating of 8% based on reviews from 50 critics, with an average rating of 3.50/10. The site's critical consensus reads, "Given the amount of talent assembled on both sides of the camera, Are You Here falls bewilderingly flat." On Metacritic, the film has a weighted average score of 37 out of 100, based on reviews from 23 critics, indicating "generally unfavorable" reviews.

The film received a grade C from The A.V. Club writer Ignatiy Vishnevetsky, who commented on its bland stylistic choices but praised Weiner's ability to get good performances from its actors.
