= Salem Ludwig =

American actor (1915–2007)

- Born: July 31, 1915 (New York (state)) Brooklyn, New York, United States
- Died: April 1, 2007 (aged 91) (New York (state)) New York City, New York, United States
- Years active: 1938 - 2007

Salem Ludwig (July 31, 1915 – April 1, 2007) was an American character actor and highly esteemed acting instructor.

Born in Brooklyn, New York, Ludwig was blacklisted in 1957 and could only find minimal stage work. He had many film and television credits and remained active, even after his 90th birthday, until his death at age 91. A biographical film, An Actor's Life was made by budding director/actress Carol Schaye, who wanted to portray actors as talented, working individuals rather than just the character they see. He was represented by Theatrical Agent Archer King.

He is known for many films including: Life on the Ledge (2005, Grandfather), Unfaithful (2002, Man with Suitcase), The Business of Strangers (2001, Man at Pool), Fast Food, Fast Women (2000, Leo), The Object of My Affection (1998, Mr Shapiro), I'm Not Rappaport (1996, Walter), For Love Or Money (1993, Customer), Family Business (1989, Nat), Heartburn (1986, Judge), Endless Love (1981, Mr Switzer), The Arab Conspiracy (1976, Ghassan Kaddara), I Love You, Alice B. Toklas (1968, Mr Fine), What's So Bad About Feeling Good? (1968), Three Sisters (1966, Ferapont), America, America (1963, Odysseus Topouzoglou), and Never Love a Stranger (1958, Moishe Moscowitz).

His television roles included attorney Solomon Rabinowitz, in an early episode of All in the Family. Rabinowitz memorably advised Archie Bunker not to pursue a whiplash case, telling him "In a court of law, you can't beat a station wagon full of nuns." (The nuns would all have been witnesses against Archie.) He also played 2 roles on the NBC-TV afternoon daytime soap opera The Doctors in 1967 as Dr. Roth and again in 1975 as George Watson. in 1985 he played Jules Rosenfeld, the dry cleaner, in the CBS-TV comedy series Kate & Allie.

== Filmography ==
Year	Title	Role	Notes
1958	Never Love a Stranger	Moishe Moscowitz	
1963	America, America	Odysseus Topouzoglou	
1966	Three Sisters	Ferapont	
1968	What's So Bad About Feeling Good?	Witter	Uncredited
1968	I Love You, Alice B. Toklas	Mr. Fine	
1971	All in the Family	Solomon Rabinowitz	
1974	The Rehearsal		
1976	The Arab Conspiracy	Ghassan Kaddara	
1981	Endless Love	Mr Switzer	
1986	Heartburn	Judge	
1986	Désordre	Réceptionniste	
1989	Family Business	Nat	
1993	For Love Or Money	Customer	
1996	I'm Not Rappaport	Waiter	
1997	Lesser Prophets	Uncle Paulie	
1998	Wrestling with Alligators	Old Man	
1998	The Object of My Affection	Mr Shapiro	
2000	Fast Food Fast Women	Leo	
2001	The Business of Strangers	Man at Pool	
2002	Unfaithful	Man with Suitcase	
2005	Life on the Ledge	Grandfather	
2007	The Savages	Mr. Sperry	
2009	A Killing on Brighton Beach	Moisheh	(final film role)
