= The Object of My Affection (novel) =

1987 novel by Stephen McCauley

- Cover of the 2006 paperback edition.
- Author: Stephen McCauley
- Language: English
- Genre: Gay literature
- Publisher: Simon & Schuster
- Publication date: 1987
- Publication place: United States
- Media type: Print (hardback & paperback)
- ISBN: 0-671-74350-3

The Object of My Affection is the debut novel of American author Stephen McCauley. It was first published in 1987 and was made into a 1998 motion picture of the same name starring Jennifer Aniston and Paul Rudd.

== Plot ==
George Mullen is a 20-something openly gay man enrolled in the English literature graduate school program at Columbia University. Although somewhat good-looking, George has moderate self-esteem problems and deep commitment issues. The novel is told from his point of view. George begins dating Robert Joley, a handsome, 40-year-old literature professor at the college. Joley (George always refers to him by his last name) also has commitment issues, and George's relationship with him is poor. They attend a party where George meets Nina Borowski, a full-figured woman who counsels battered women and rape victims at a women's crisis center while striving for her Ph.D. in psychology. Joley tells Nina that George wants to move out, even though the men have not discussed this. Angry and hurt, George moves into Nina's Brooklyn apartment. George drops out of Columbia, and takes a job teaching kindergarten alongside Melissa, a trust-fund baby into alternative culture.

George and Nina swiftly become best friends, and in time their friendship comes close to approximating romantic love. They have a mutual appreciation for junk food, and both of them are highly disorganized, somewhat lazy, and tend to hoard things. They both enjoy movies, and they impulsively take ballroom dancing lessons. Nina is dating Howard, a feminist and legal aid lawyer.

The plot changes when Nina tells George that she is pregnant with Howard's child. Nina does not want to marry Howard, and asks George if he will raise the child with her. George agrees. Despite Nina's request that Howard remain unaware of the pregnancy for now, George unintentionally lets the secret out. After a few weeks, Nina begins to break up with Howard, who is devastated. Although a year has now passed since George and Joley dated, Joley contacts George and asks him to vacation at an inn in Vermont. George eagerly consents.

During the trip to Vermont, Joley reveals that he did not get tenure at Columbia, and asks George to move with him to Seattle, Washington. At last, George sees Joley as more pathetic than sexually attractive or mature. At the inn, George meets Paul Schneider, a Jewish newspaper reporter in Vermont. They spend the night together, and George meets Paul's adopted Salvadoran son, Gabriel. Joley returns to New York without George, and never contacts him again.

Having returned to New York City, George learns that his co-worker Melissa is dating Howard. During the Thanksgiving holiday, Paul travels to New York City to visit his mother, Molly, and spends some time with George. Molly takes a strong interest in Nina. Soon thereafter, George allows a mother going through a nasty divorce to take her son home at the end of the school day. In fact, the mother is abducting her own child, which enrages the child's father. Melissa breaks up with Howard. George is suspended from his job just before Christmas, then travels to Vermont to spend Christmas with Paul. As the vacation ends, George tells Paul about being fired, and Paul is angry that George doesn't trust him.

Back in Brooklyn, Nina is upset that George is falling in love with Paul. With Molly's encouragement, she has turned her life around by getting rid of clothes and mementos she has hoarded, and has begun work again on her dissertation. George and Nina's friendship becomes rocky, and they take up ballroom dancing lessons again. Frank, George's younger brother, invites George to his wedding. George's family is shocked to find Nina pregnant, and they had told Frank's soon-to-be in-laws that George was heterosexual. This leads to George and Nina deciding not to attend the wedding. The two travel by train back to New York City. They stop in Providence, Rhode Island, on the way home, get a room at an inn, and make love.

The act of sexual intercourse ruins George and Nina's intimate friendship, as George had long suspected it would.

The book ends with an epilogue, set about six months later. George has moved to Vermont to live with Paul, and taken a job as a kindergarten teacher there. Nina has had her baby, and named the child Emily. Melissa has gone to law school, and Paul's mother has moved in with Nina to help care for Nina's child. Nina has allowed Howard back into her life, to a limited degree, so that he can see his daughter.

=== Main characters ===
- George Mullen - narrator of the novel, and the 20-something protagonist. Originally from Boston, Massachusetts, George has been out of the closet since college. George lacks self-esteem and is terrified of commitment, to his friends and to his boyfriends. George has several neuroses, is lazy, begins projects but rarely finishes them, and spends most of his free time listening to pop music from the 1950s.
- Nina Borowski - A Polish American woman in her late 20s, and George's best friend. Nina is much like George (lazy, a hoarder, etc.), and rarely works on her doctoral dissertation. Like George, she is relentlessly cynical.
- Howard - Nina's boyfriend. Howard is very liberal and a feminist, and often apologizes for things he says which he feels are offensive. He is a good cook, and somewhat slovenly in his attire. Howard is besotted with Nina, gives her suffocatingly saccharine pet names and is somewhat overbearing.
- Robert Joley - Referred to by George as "Joley", he is a handsome professor of literature at Columbia University. Joley is sexually promiscuous, and not committed to his relationship with George. When Joley does not get tenure, he shaves off his beard, which makes George realize how old, average looking, and sad Joley really is.
- Paul Schneider - A tall, skinny, unkempt newspaper publisher and reporter in Vermont, Paul is Jewish and very liberal. A year earlier, he broke up with his lover, Robert. He has a six-year-old son, Gabriel, who is an orphan from El Salvador whom Paul adopted. Paul is immensely attracted to George, and although George's dissembling and attempts to push Paul away anger Paul, Paul patiently works to help George become more at ease with their relationship. Paul has a habit of attributing to Gabriel the feelings he himself has.
- Melissa - George's co-teacher at the kindergarten, Melissa comes from a wealthy family and is very opinionated. She participates in alternative culture, and quits her job in protest when the kindergarten suspends George for nine months.
- Molly Schneider - Paul's mother, she is a divorced woman who is a former member of the Communist Party USA. She spends most of her time as a political activist.
- Timothy - George's best friend, and an architect. He is highly opinionated, critical of almost everyone and everything, and is so afraid of intimacy that he sets George up on blind dates with anyone who shows an interest in himself.
- Gabriel Schneider - Nicknamed "Gabie", he is Paul's adopted son from El Salvador. He is very loud, and calls adults by their first name.

== Genesis of the novel ==
In 1983, author Stephen McCauley was a student in the graduate writing program at Columbia University. He wrote a short story about gay man named George and straight woman named Nina and their attempt to deal with Nina's pregnancy. Stephen Koch, a professor of literature at Columbia, suggested expanding the short story into a book-length novel.

The character of George shared many characteristics with McCauley himself, including his dislike of travel, his attendance at Columbia and other aspects of McCauley's personality. McCauley graduated from the University of Vermont (where George travels in the novel) and enrolled in several graduate programs in psychology (as Nina is enrolled).

McCauley said his novel was about how deeply selfish but generally good-hearted people must balance their needs against those of the people they love. "There is a sort of confusion in people's lives today—there are so many options," he said. "Perhaps my generation has been brought up to think you have a right to want what you want and to do it all, and I don't think you can. You have to give up some piece of yourself. You can't be selfish when you raise a child or are with another person. You can't act purely on whimsy."

== Critical reception ==
Susan Fromberg Schaeffer, reviewing the novel for The New York Times, called it "very funny" and "exceptionally vivid". She said that McCauley "brings his characters, his world astonishingly, captivatingly alive." Sarah Gold of the Los Angeles Times called the novel "warmly engaging". She found some of the characters too mannered rather than alive, while others were too thinly written. Although she found the ending disappointed, she also noted it was "a final, bittersweet encounter [which] rounds out [a] novel...full of wonderful moments, gentle humor, and a happily jaundiced view of contemporary attitudes and inanities." An anonymous reviewer in The Washington Post called it a "quaint and quirky novel" with "wry and witty thrust-and-parry writing", but felt that McCauley never explained the basis for George and Nina's love and that the ending left the reader without resolution.

The novel was named a "Bear in Mind" book by The New York Times, as one which the editors felt were of particular interest. The New York Times also named the novel one of its "Notable Books of the Year".

== Film ==
Playwright Wendy Wasserstein optioned the novel for the screen in 1990. The feature film, The Object of My Affection, was released in October 1998.
