= Goodbye, New York =

1985 film by Amos Kollek

- Theatrical poster
- Directed by: Amos Kollek
- Written by: Amos Kollek
- Produced by: Amos Kollek
- Starring: Julie Hagerty; Amos Kollek; Shmuel Shilo; Aviva Ger; Dudu Topaz
- Cinematography: Amnon Salomon
- Edited by: Alan Heim
- Music by: Michael Abene
- Production company: Kole-Hill Productions
- Distributed by: Castle Hill Productions (US)
- Release dates: May 17, 1985 (US); December 19, 1985 (Australia)
- Running time: 90 minutes
- Countries: Israel; US
- Language: English

Goodbye, New York is a 1985 Israeli-American comedy drama produced, directed and written by Amos Kollek in his directorial debut, who also co-stars alongside Julie Hagerty.

The story follows an American woman who accidentally ends up in Israel instead of Paris. She experiences adventures in the country, including life in a kibbutz, love, and heartbreak, before ultimately deciding to return to Paris.

The film was shot in New York and various locations in Israel, including Ein Gev, Jerusalem, Tel Aviv, the Dead Sea, Ben Gurion Airport, and more.

Teddy Kollek makes a cameo appearance in the film.

== Plot ==
A ditzy New Yorker (Julie Hagerty) is devastated to learn that her husband has been unfaithful and impulsively decides to go to Paris to escape. When she consumes too many sedatives and oversleeps on the plane, missing her connection, she winds up in Tel Aviv, penniless and with no luggage or friends. After connecting with a cabdriver and part-time soldier (Amos Kollek), she finds herself stranded on a kibbutz near the Golan Heights where she must learn to cope with a series of misadventures and a very unfamiliar lifestyle.

== Cast ==
- Julie Hagerty as Nancy Callaghan
- Amos Kollek as David
- Shmuel Shilo as Moishe
- Aviva Ger as Illana
- Dudu Topaz as Albert
- Jennifer Prichard née Babtist as Lisa
- Christopher Goutman as Jack
- Hanan Goldblatt as Avi
- Mosko Alkalai as Papalovski

== Critical reception ==
Janet Maslin of The New York Times said the film possesses "an easygoing charm that, among Israeli films, is rare", presenting "witty impressions of Israeli life" and the clash of cultures. Candace Russell of the South Florida Sun-Sentinel likened Kollek's "absurdist worldview and droll understatement" to that of Woody Allen. While People thought the film "likable" and "genial", the reviewers noted its "uneven" script and direction, and a "sometimes contrived or just plain silly" plot. London's Time Out was more unequivocal, dismissing the "thin and clichéd material", its "predictable plot and dismal propaganda about the values of kibbutz culture."
