= Anantara Palazzo Naiadi Rome Hotel =

Luxury hotel in Rome, Italy

- Interactive map of the Anantara Palazzo Naiadi Rome Hotel area
- Hotel chain: Anantara Hotels & Resorts

General information
- Architectural style: Neoclassical
- Location: Piazza della Repubblica, 47, Rome, Italy
- Coordinates: 41.9025°N 12.4962°E
- Opening: 2003; 23 years ago
- Owner: Minor Hotels

Design and construction
- Architects: Gaetano Koch, Maurizio Papiri, and Adam D. Tihany

Other information
- Number of rooms: 232

Website
- anantara.com/en/palazzo-naiadi-rome

The Anantara Palazzo Naiadi Rome Hotel (formerly the Boscolo Exedra Roma) is a five-star luxury hotel in Piazza della Repubblica, Rome situated near the Baths of Diocletian and the Michelangelo-designed Basilica of Santa Maria degli Angeli. The hotel is part of the Anantara Hotels & Resorts brand under Minor Hotels.

== History ==
The building was originally built in 1887 as part of two twin neoclassical-style buildings constructed by Gaetano Koch. It was developed into a luxury hotel in the early 2000s. The new hotel was redesigned by architect Maurizio Papiri and designer Adam D. Tihany. The hotel embraces a wing that was built in 1705 by Pope Clement XI as a grain store. Some ruins of the Baths of Diocletian can be seen through glass in the basement.

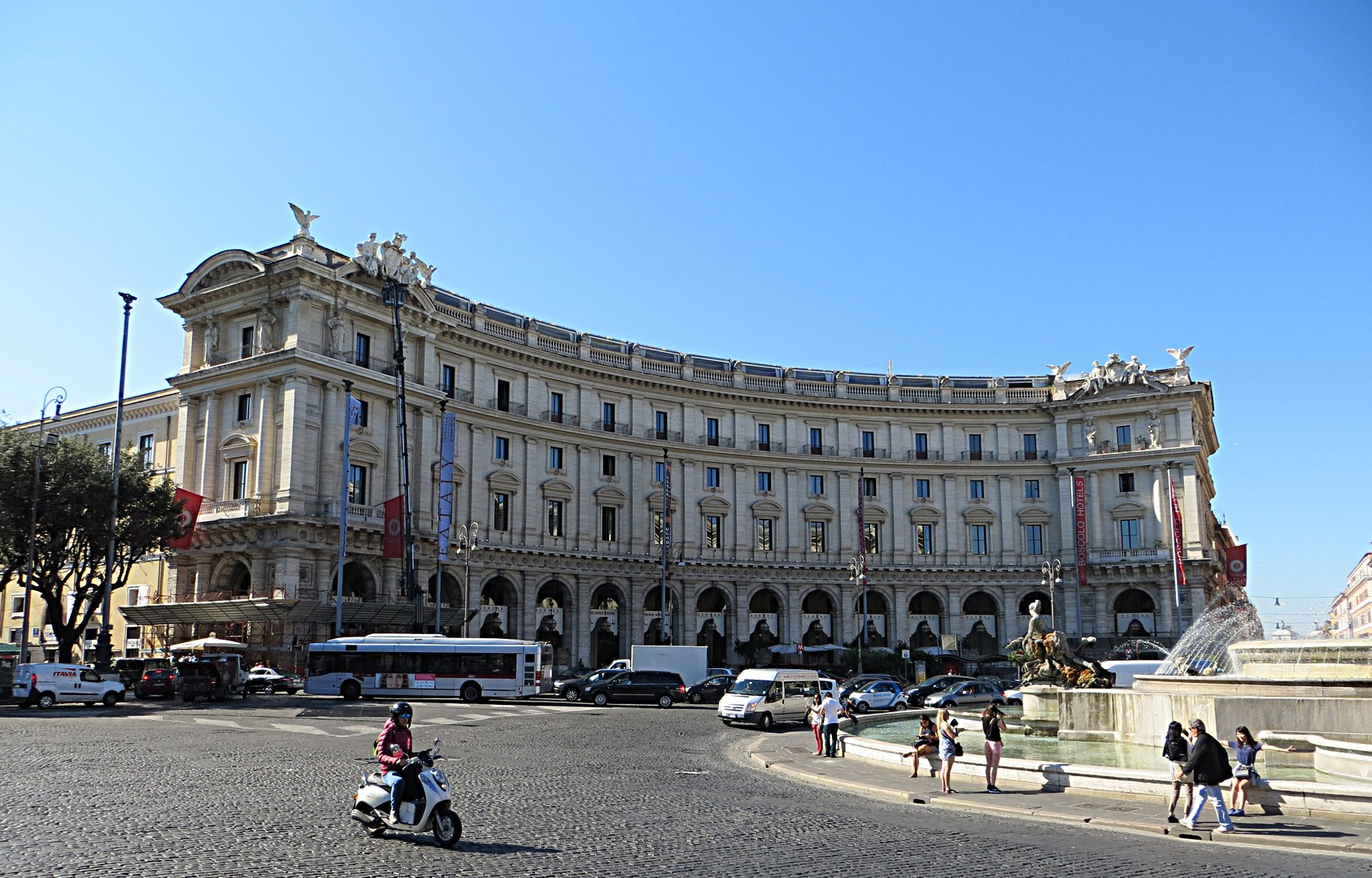
The Anantara Palazzo Naiadi Rome Hotel and Piazza della Repubblica

The hotel was one of the Boscolo Hotels chain run by the Boscolo family that once had eight five-star hotels in Europe. In 2011, it became part of the Autograph Collection by Marriott. Gruppo Boscolo was acquired in 2017 by Värde Partners, and the Boscolo Exedra Roma was rebranded as the Palazzo Naiadi (the old name of the square) in April 2018 after being included in the newly launched hotel chain The Dedica Anthology. In January 2020, Covivio, a European investment and development company, bought Palazzo Naiadi and seven other hotels of The Dedica Anthology, announcing that Palazzo Naiadi will be a member of the NH Collection, which is managed by Madrid-headquartered NH Hotel Group.

In 2018, Minor Hotels, the parent company of Anantara Hotels & Resorts, acquired a majority stake in NH Hotel Group. Subsequently, several properties under the former Boscolo portfolio are rebranded under the Anantara brand.

On June 19, 2013, actor James Gandolfini died in the hospital after a heart attack in the hotel.

The hotel served as a filming location for the 2021 movie House of Gucci.

== Hotel ==
Palazzo Naiadi has 232 guest rooms and suites. It features multiple bars and restaurants, including Tazio Restaurant and Tazio Bar, named after Italian paparazzo Tazio Secchiaroli who was the inspiration for Federico Fellini's classic 1960 film La Dolce Vita. Breakfast is served at La Frusta, which was once a main restaurant. It is on the first floor with a look over Piazza della Repubblica, decorated in black-and-white photography and designs inspired by Fellini's films. The hotel has eight meeting rooms with a total space of 471 square meters and an overall capacity of 430 people. The largest rooms are the Diocleziano Meeting Room and the Michelangelo Meeting Room.
