= Shmuel Shilo =

Israeli actor and theatre director (1929–2011)

- שמואל שילה
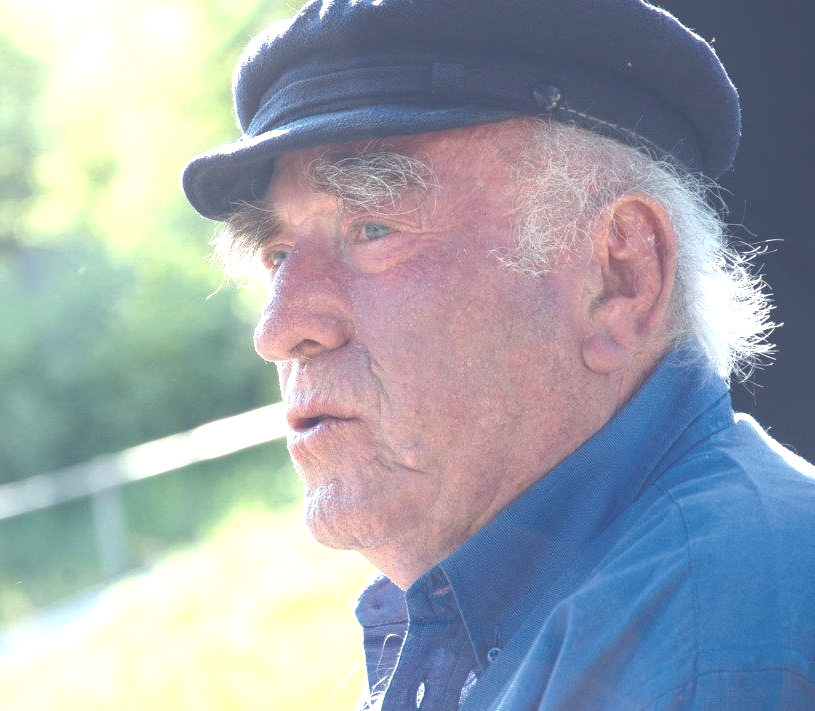
- Born: 1 December 1929; Łuck, Second Polish Republic
- Died: 4 October 2011 (aged 81); Tze'elim, Israel
- Other name: Shmulik Shiloh
- Occupations: Actor; theatre director
- Years active: 1951–2011
- Children: 4

Shmuel Shilo (Hebrew: שמואל שילה; 1 December 1929 – 4 October 2011) was an Israeli actor, director and producer, best remembered for his role on the Israeli production of Rechov Sumsum, a popular TV show based on Sesame Street. In 1983 he founded the Negev Theatre and served as its creative director for fifteen years.

== Biography ==
Shmuel Shilo was born in Łuck, eastern Poland (now Lutsk, Ukraine). Following the Nazi-Soviet invasion of Poland and the creation of the Łuck Ghetto by the German occupation authorities in December 1941, Shmuel (Shmulik, age twelve) was interned in the ghetto along with his family and 20,000 other Polish Jews. He survived the ghetto liquidation action of August 19, 1942, hiding in a cellar with his mother and siblings, and the subsequent deportation to Górka Połonka killing fields. On September 12 he joined the slave workers in a Nazi labor camp set up at the Jewish school building. He escaped once more, during a prisoner revolt by hiding under a work bench, and survived the war in the forests amongst partisans. In 1946, after reuniting with his sister rescued by the Poles, he made aliyah to Palestine, where he joined the Palmach. He was a founding member of Kibbutz Tze'elim.

== Acting and directing career ==
Shilo studied acting and performed regularly in several theatres. In 1983 he founded the Negev Theatre and served as its art director until 1997. He also acted in several films and television series, best known for his role on the Israeli production of Sesame Street, Rechov Sumsum. He died of cancer at the age of 81.

== Filmography ==
Year	Title	Role	Notes
1981	Sipur Intimi		
1982	Noa Bat 17	Shraga	
1982	Hamsin		
1985	Goodbye, New York	Moishe	
1986	Yaldei Stalin		
1986	Malkat Hakitah	Baruch	
1986	Gloves		
1987	I Don't Give a Damn		
1987	Ha-Holmim	Halperin	
1987	The Impossible Spy	Rabbi	TV movie
1989	Sadot Yerukim		
1992	Double Edge	Moshe	
1998	Aviv	Shmuel	
2001	Ajimae	King Bataton	TV movie
2003	Meorav Yerushalmi		Episode: "Kise Ha-Sandak"
2006	The Galilee Eskimos	Faybel	
2006	Ha-Chaim Ze Lo Ha-Kol	Ephraim Rozanski	Episode: "Yam Shel D'maot"
2007	The Little Traitor	Mr. Lazarus	
2009-2012	Prisoners of War	Yoske	2 episodes, (final appearance)
2011	Footnote	Committee Member	
