= The Dedica Anthology Hotels =

Luxury hotel chain

The Dedica Anthology
- Industry: Hospitality, Tourism
- Founded: 2018
- Headquarters: Milan, Italy
- Number of locations: 9
- Products: Hotels, Restaurants
- Website: www.dahotels.com

The Dedica Anthology was a luxury hotel brand launched on 21 April 2018.

== History ==
In 1978 the Boscolo Family opened its first Hotel in Sottomarina. During the following 40 years the business grew under the Boscolo Hotels brand and further openings and acquisition were made, including hotels in the main Italian art cities (Rome, Florence, Milan), Nice, Lyon, Budapest and Prague.

In 2017 Minneapolis-based global alternative investment firm Värde Partners acquired Gruppo Boscolo, becoming owner of nine Boscolo hotels. In 2018 five of the hotels were rebranded as The Dedica Anthology, with four initially becoming associate properties of the new brand. The brand encompasses five 5-star hotel properties and four 4-star associate properties, located in Italy and across Europe. The properties, previously part of Boscolo Hotels, were acquired by US-based private equity group Värde Partners, in association with Deutsche Bank, in 2017. The brand was led by the hotelier Stephen Alden as CEO.

Värde Partners sold The Dedica Anthology to Covivio in January 2019,; in 2020 all the hotels have been rebranded, some to NH Hotels and some to Anantara Hotels, Resorts & Spas.

== Notable hotels ==
These are their 5 star hotels:

- Palazzo Naiadi Hotel, Rome, formerly Boscolo Exedra Roma
- Grand Hotel Dei Dogi, Venice, formerly Boscolo Venezia, before that Boscolo Dei Dogi
- New York Palace Budapest, Budapest, formerly Boscolo Budapest Hotel, before that Boscolo New York Palace
- Carlo IV, Prague, formerly Boscolo Prague, before that Boscolo Carlo IV
- Palazzo Gaddi, Florence, formerly Hotel Astoria (reopening in 2020)
- Hotel Plaza, Nice, formerly Boscolo Plaza (reopening in 2020)
