= Worlds Away =

Worlds Away may refer to:

- Worlds Away (Pablo Cruise album) (1978)
- Worlds Away (Strange Advance album) (1982)
- Worlds Away (Crumbächer-Duke album) (1990)
- Worlds Away (Ian Moss album) (1991)
- Worlds Away (John Norum album) (1996)
- "Worlds Away" (From First to Last song) (2008)
- Cirque du Soleil: Worlds Away, a 2012 film

== See also ==
- WorldsAway, an online virtual world
- Worlds Apart (disambiguation)
