= Great Synagogue (Lutsk) =

Former synagogue in Lutsk, Ukraine

Great Synagogue of Lutsk
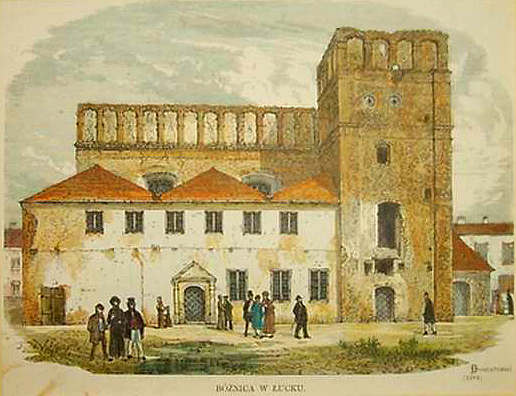
- An 1872 woodcut image of the former synagogue

- Location of the former synagogue in Ukraine

Religion
- Affiliation: Orthodox Judaism (former)
- Rite: Nusach Ashkenaz
- Ecclesiastical or organizational status: Synagogue (1626–1942); Sports club (since 1970s)
- Status: Inactive

Location
- Location: 33 Karaimska Street, Lutsk, Volyn Oblast 43000
- Country: Ukraine
- Interactive map of Great Synagogue of Lutsk
- Coordinates: 50°44′09″N 25°19′07″E

Architecture
- Type: Synagogue architecture
- Style: Renaissance; Fortress synagogue
- Completed: 1629
- Materials: Brick

The Great Synagogue is a former Orthodox Jewish synagogue, located at 33 Karaimska Street, in the Jewish quarter of Lutsk (Polish: Łuck), in Volyn Oblast, Ukraine. The congregation worshipped in the Ashkenazi rite.

The Renaissance fortress synagogue building was built in 1626 in the Polish–Lithuanian Commonwealth, and it was the religious, educational and community centre of Lutsk Jews until the invasion of Poland in World War II. Partially destroyed in 1942, the synagogue was restored in the 1970s and was subsequently used as a sports club.

== History ==
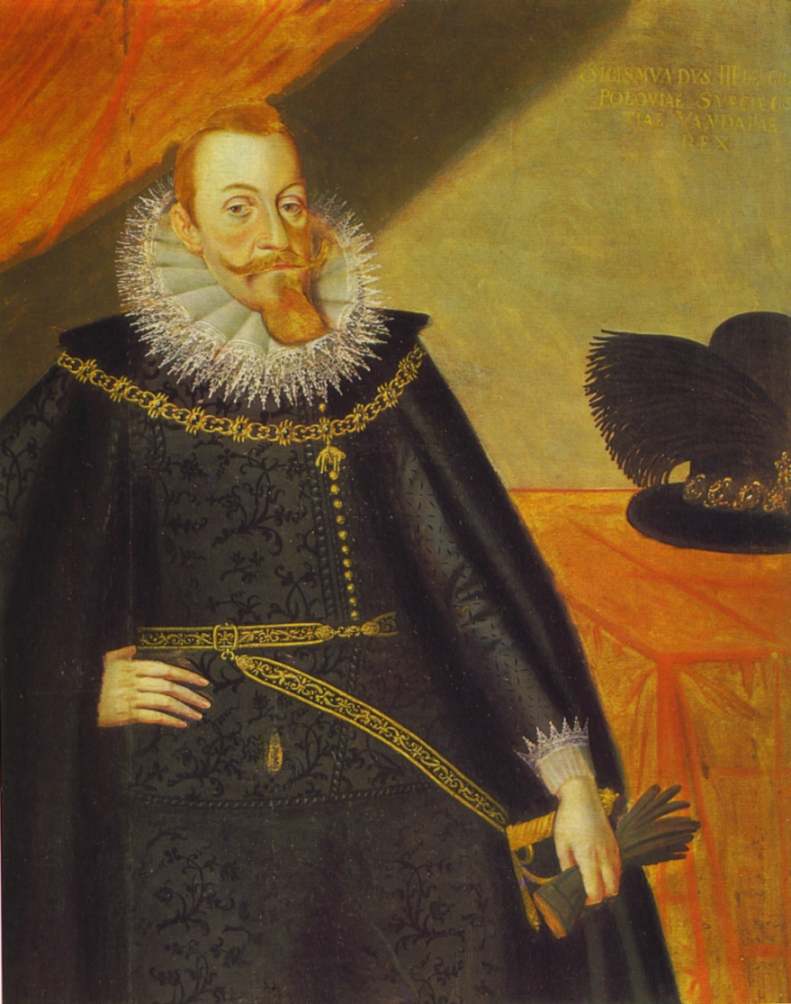
King Sigismund III Vasa

The first records of the Jews in Lutsk date from 1388. Vytautas the Great, Grand Duke of Lithuania, granted privileges for Lutsk Jews. Towards the end of the 15th century, the Jewish community of Lutsk had acquired considerable wealth and influence, and some of its members figured prominently as tax collectors. The Jews were generally engaged in trade but they also owned a brewery and operated guilds. Scientific research indicates that the first brick synagogue was built in second half of the 16th century. It is assumed the synagogue must have been destroyed by fire during the Tatars raid in 1617. The new synagogue was then built on the ruins of the old building.

King Sigismund III Vasa of Poland approved the construction of a new synagogue and school on 5 May 1626. However construction of the synagogue was opposed by its Dominican neighbours. Under Christian rules, synagogues could not exceed a certain height. However, the king confirmed his approval and the Jewish community was victorious. The Dominicans had fallen from favor with the royal court. The height of synagogue was not to exceed that of the Dominican church.

The cube-shaped prayer hall representing architecture of the Italian-Polish Renaissance was the main part of new synagogue. The walls were up to 1.5 metres (4 ft 11 in) thick. There were two additional sections used by women and for the Jewish school or Yeshiva. A defensive tower containing the arsenal with loopholes was built on the southern corner of the prayer hall according to the wishes the king. The tower formed part of city walls, allowing the synagogue to contribute to defences in addition to its religious and educational roles.

=== Modern era ===
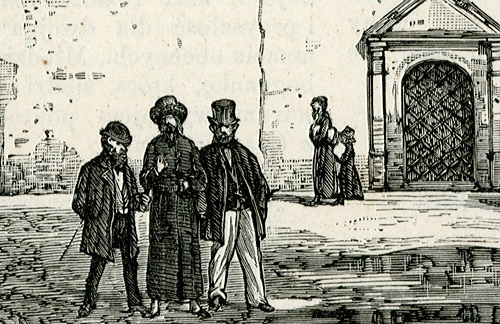
Lutsk Jews in the 19th century

In 1869, the synagogue was damaged by fire. It was restored in 1886. In the 19th century, the way of life of the Jewish community of Lutsk had changed due to the economic and legislative features of Russian Empire. In accordance with the trends of the time, the Jewish community was segmented. New Jewish quarters with synagogues appeared in Lutsk. The old quarters were generally populated by poor Jews living in dirty wooden houses built close to each other. As a result, the main synagogue lost its central role.

The synagogue was shelled during the First World War but not seriously damaged. In the Second Polish Republic, the city of Łuck became the capital of the Wołyń Voivodeship (1921–39) and in 1936 the provincial administration contributed funds for its restoration.

=== World War II ===
The invading Soviets annexed the city to the Ukrainian SSR in 1939 along with the entire region. After the German attack on the Soviet Union in 1941, Lutsk (German: Luzk) became the sight of a pogrom organized by the Ukrainian People's Militia and the synagogue along with the Jewish district were set on fire.

In December 1941 the Lutsk Ghetto was established. In August and September 1942, about 17,000 prisoners of the ghetto were killed by Order Police battalions. The ghetto was liquidated in December 1942. The former main synagogue building stood empty. Many years after the war it was reconstructed as a movie-house and a gym.

== Architecture ==
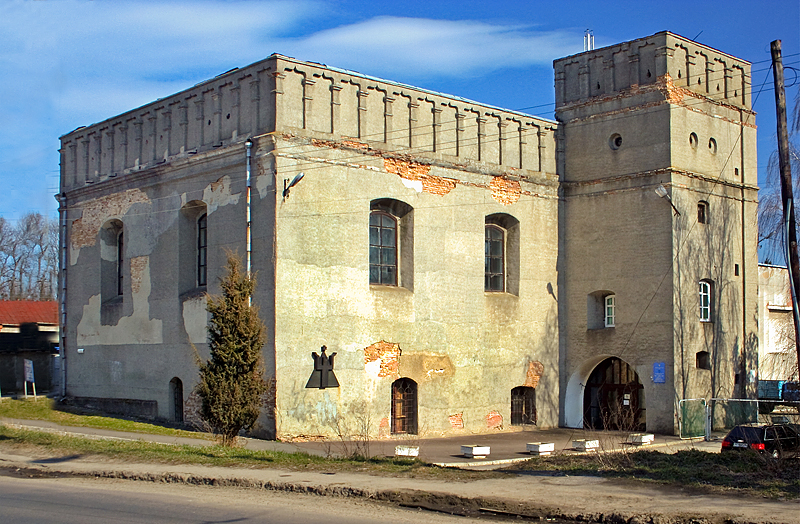
The synagogue building in 2008

Some researchers and museums have investigated the history of the synagogue. The Nahum Goldmann Museum of the Jewish Diaspora Beth Hatefutsoth located on the Tel Aviv University campus has a model of synagogue. The model reveals architectural details which were lost during the World Wars. The Center for Jewish Art in the Hebrew University of Jerusalem created a 3D-model of the exterior and interior. On 30 May 1995, a commemorative plaque dedicated to the lost Jews was erected on the synagogue wall.

The former synagogue is a cube-shaped building with a tower. Rational clarity, brevity, and restraint in decoration contribute to its Renaissance style. No individual feature of the synagogue reveals the building's religious character owing to the public functions of old synagogues. There are unexplored dungeons under the building.

In April 2021 it was reported that the municipal authority, that owns the building, will gift the former synagogue to the Jewish Community of Lutsk, a nonprofit that represents Chabad Jews of the area.

== Gallery ==
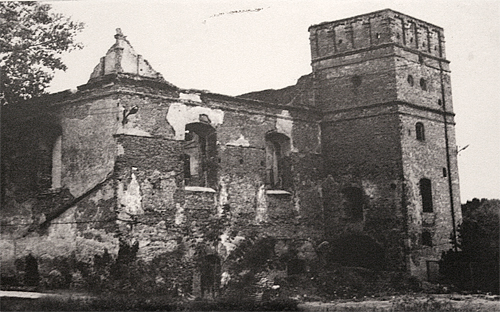
Wartime destruction

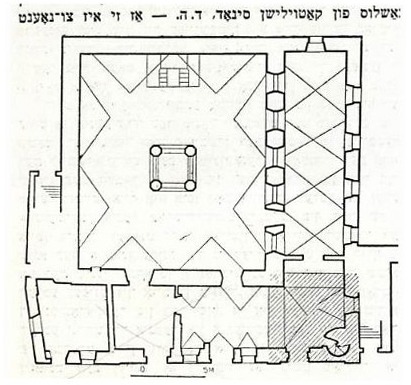
Plan of the Synagogue

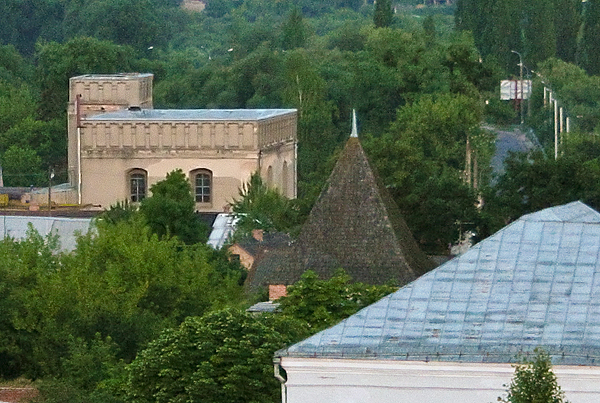
Synagogue (background) and Jesuit cathedral roof in c. 2008

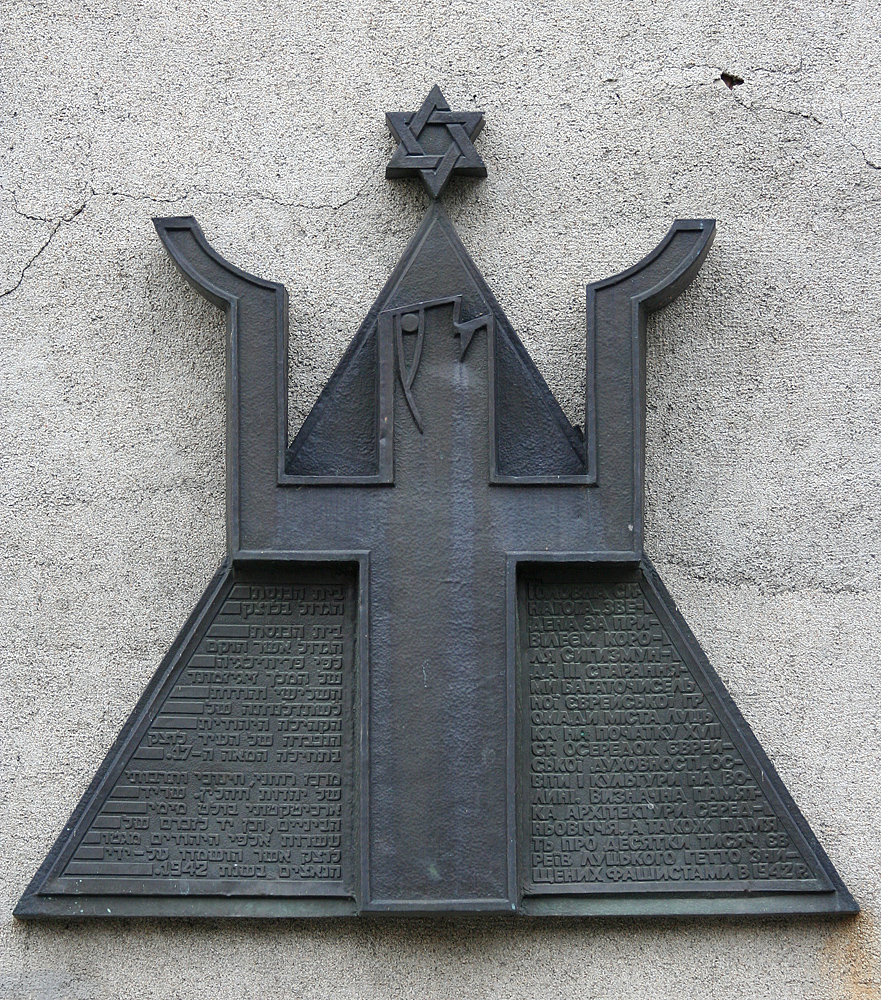
Plaque

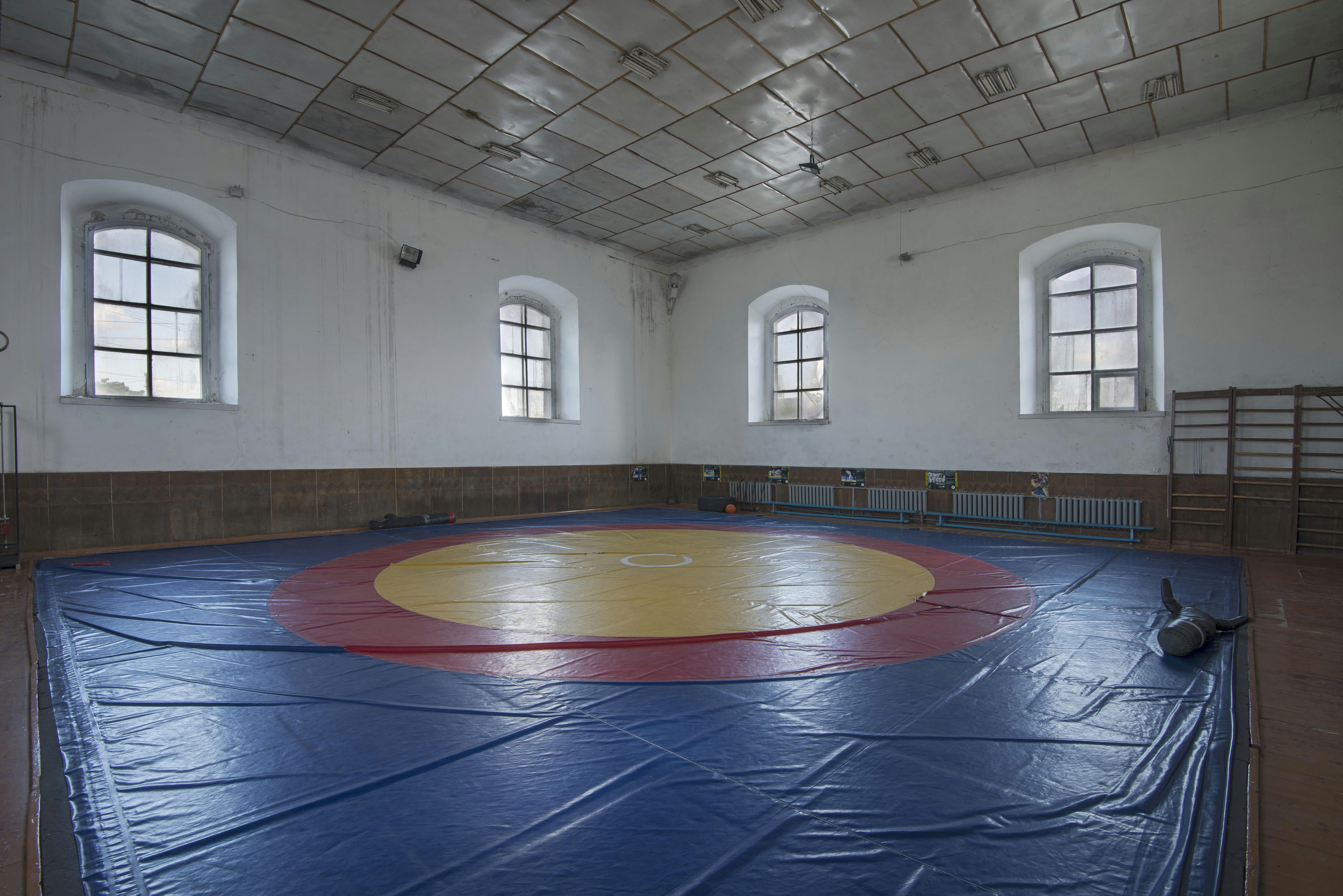
Synagogue interior, in 2017

== See also ==
- History of the Jews in Ukraine
- List of synagogues in Ukraine
