= Fast Food Fast Women =

- Directed by: Amos Kollek
- Written by: Amos Kollek
- Produced by: Hengameh Panahi
- Starring: Anna Thomson
- Cinematography: Jean-Marc Fabre
- Edited by: Sheri Bylander
- Music by: David Carbonara
- Release date: 15 May 2000
- Running time: 95 minutes
- Country: France
- Language: English

Fast Food Fast Women is a 2000 American romantic-comedy/vehicular-action film written and directed by Amos Kollek and financed by French and Italian production companies. The tag line for the film was "There are 18 million people in New York City, but only one like Bella." It was entered into the 2000 Cannes Film Festival.

== Synopsis ==
Bella, a single waitress at a café-restaurant, is about to turn 35. Her mother sets her up on a date with a young writer who has just been granted custody of his children by his ex-wife. Meanwhile, the café's regulars are also in search of love: Paul, a retired widower, resorts to personal ads in hopes of finding a new companion.

== Cast ==
- Anna Thomson as Bella
- Jamie Harris as Bruno
- Louise Lasser as Emily
- Robert Modica as Paul
- Lonette McKee as Sherry-Lynn
- Victor Argo as Seymour
- Angelica Torn as Vitka
- Austin Pendleton as George
- Sandrine Holt as Giselle
- Valerie Geffner as Wanda
- Mark Margolis as Graham
- Judith Roberts as Bella's Mother
- Lynn Cohen as Jesse
- Salem Ludwig as Leo
- Irma St. Paule as Mary-Beth
