= The Object of My Affection =

1998 American romantic comedy-drama film

- Theatrical release poster
- Directed by: Nicholas Hytner
- Screenplay by: Wendy Wasserstein
- Based on: The Object of My Affection by Stephen McCauley
- Produced by: Laurence Mark
- Starring: Jennifer Aniston; Paul Rudd; Alan Alda; Nigel Hawthorne; John Pankow; Tim Daly
- Cinematography: Oliver Stapleton
- Edited by: Tariq Anwar
- Music by: George Fenton
- Distributed by: 20th Century Fox
- Release date: April 17, 1998
- Running time: 111 minutes
- Country: United States
- Language: English
- Budget: $15 million
- Box office: $46.9 million

The Object of My Affection is a 1998 American romantic comedy-drama film directed by Nicholas Hytner, starring Jennifer Aniston and Paul Rudd alongside Allison Janney, Alan Alda, Nigel Hawthorne, John Pankow, and Tim Daly. The film was adapted from novel of the same name by Stephen McCauley and the screenplay was written by Wendy Wasserstein. The story focuses on a New York social worker who, after becoming pregnant by her boyfriend, develops romantic feelings for her new gay roommate and decides she would rather raise her child with him.

It was filmed in 1997 in various locations around New York City, New Jersey, and Connecticut. The film received mixed reviews and was a moderate box office success grossing $46.9 million against a production budget of $15 million.

== Plot ==
Social worker Nina Borowski is a young woman living in a Brooklyn apartment. Nina attends a party given by her stepsister Constance and her husband, Sidney. There, Nina meets George Hanson, a young first-grade teacher, who is gay, and his boyfriend Dr. Robert Joley. Nina tells George that her stepsister is constantly trying to fix her up with somebody from higher society, since she disapproves of Nina's boyfriend Vince. Then Nina offers George a room in her apartment as she has just been told by Robert that George is looking for somewhere to live. Since this is news to George, he is taken aback and heartbroken, and after the party, the two split up. George accepts Nina's offer and moves into her apartment.

The two soon become good friends, watching films together and going ballroom dancing. When Nina announces that she is pregnant, Vince, the baby's father, wants to marry her, but she declines and they break up. George offers to help raise the child. For some time, they live happily together in her apartment, until Nina finds that her love for George is growing every day, especially after he tells her he had a girlfriend in high school, leading her to believe they might develop a romantic relationship.

One afternoon, George and Nina kiss and start to become intimate when George gets a phone call from Robert, telling George he has missed him and inviting him away for the weekend. George is confused but agrees to go. Nina feels rejected and jealous. Over the weekend, George and Robert do not re-establish their relationship, but George meets Paul James, a young actor, and the two are attracted to each other. Meanwhile, Nina stays with Constance at a vacation mansion and is extremely moody. Not enjoying herself, she decides to head back home on a late bus, and phones to ask George to go along with her, but he wants to stay with Paul. Back in Brooklyn, her purse is snatched and a friendly police officer, Louis, gives her a ride home.

Nina invites Paul and his older acting mentor with whom he lives, Rodney, for Thanksgiving, after a rather prickly brunch with a late arriving George, his brother Frank, and his brother's latest fiancée. After the evening winds down, Paul stays the night with George, resulting in a heated argument between George and Nina, and heartache for Rodney.

At Frank's wedding, Nina and George continue their discussion as Nina begins to realize the reality of their situation. Nina fully explains to George her feelings for him. George, who loves Nina as his best friend, tells her that, ultimately, he wants to be with Paul. A few hours later, Nina gives birth to a baby girl she names Molly. Vince, ecstatic, visits her in the hospital, but when he leaves to complete paperwork, Nina and George remain alone with Molly. Nina asks George to move out of her apartment before she gets home from the hospital, stating that it would hurt her too much to have him stay while knowing that he doesn't love her the same way she does him.

Eight years later at George's school, everyone goes to see Molly in a musical production that George has directed. George is now the principal of the school, Nina is in a relationship with Louis, and George is still with Paul. Rodney is also there, still considered 'one of the family' by Louis and Nina. Nina, George, and young Molly (who refers to George as her "Uncle George") walk together, hand-in-hand, on their way to get coffee and talk.

== Cast ==
- Jennifer Aniston as Nina Borowski
- Paul Rudd as George Hanson
- John Pankow as Vince McBride
- Allison Janney as Constance Miller
- Alan Alda as Sidney Miller
- Tim Daly as Dr. Robert Joley
- Joan Copeland as Madame Reynolds
- Steve Zahn as Frank Hanson
- Amo Gulinello as Paul James
- Kevin Carroll as Louis Crowley
- Nigel Hawthorne as Rodney Fraser
- Kali Rocha as Melissa
- Gabriel Macht as Steve Casillo
- Sarah Hyland as Molly
- Holli Marie Connors as the girl at the zoo
- Hayden Panettiere as Mermaid
- Liam Aiken as Nathan
- Bruce Altman as Dr. Goldstein
- Daniel Cosgrove as Trotter Bull
- Marilyn Dobrin as Mrs Sarni
- Samia Shoaib as Suni
- Audra McDonald as wedding singer
- Lauren Pratt as Sally
  - Paz de la Huerta as 13-year-old Sally
- Salem Ludwig as Mr. Shapiro
- Antonia Rey as Mrs. Ochoa
- John Roland as TV Anchor
- Rosanna Scotto as TV Anchor
- Kia Goodwin as Juliet

== Production ==
Paramount Pictures optioned McCauley's book in the late 1980s. In 1993, Nicholas Hytner was brought in as director. Winona Ryder was offered the role of Nina, but turned it down so Uma Thurman was cast opposite Keanu Reeves. Paramount dropped the project in November 1996 and later Reeves and Thurman also dropped out. Jennifer Aniston and Paul Rudd were cast instead.

The shooting took place from June to July 1997, in the New York area.

== Release ==
=== Box office ===
The Object of My Affection was released in US theaters on April 17, 1998, and took in $9,725,855 during its opening weekend, coming in at number two at the box office in 1,890 theaters, averaging $5,146 per theater. The film went on to gross $29,187,243 in the United States alone, over a span of five weekends. The film continued to open in European countries throughout the fall and winter of 1998, and ultimately grossed $17,718,646 outside of the United States.

=== Critical reception ===
Critical reaction to the film was mixed. Roger Ebert gave the film two stars, saying: "The Object of My Affection deals with some real issues and has scenes that work, but you can see the wheels of the plot turning so clearly that you doubt the characters have much freedom to act on their own." Ruthe Stein of the San Francisco Chronicle said the film "occasionally borders on being too clever. But that's a small quibble about a movie that gets so much right."

On the review aggregator website Rotten Tomatoes, 52% of 58 critics' reviews are positive, with an average rating of 5.8/10. The website's consensus reads: "Despite heartfelt performances from Jennifer Aniston and Paul Rudd, The Object of My Affection suffers from too many plot contrivances and frequent turns into rom-com sappiness." Metacritic, which uses a weighted average, assigned the film a score of 51 out of 100, based on 18 critics, indicating "mixed or average" reviews.

=== Accolades ===
The film received a GLAAD Media award nomination for Outstanding Film (Wide Release), and Nigel Hawthorne won the London Critics Circle Film award for British Supporting Actor of the Year.

== Soundtrack ==
The Object of My Affection OST

Soundtrack album by George Fenton
- Released: January 1, 1998
- Genre: Score
- Length: 36:50
- Label: Ark 21 Records

George Fenton chronology
Dangerous Beauty (1998)	The Object of My Affection OST (1998)	My Name Is Joe (1998)

All tracks are written by George Fenton.

No.	Title	Length
1.	"The Object of My Affection"	2:31
2.	"The School Show (Front Titles)"	2:21
3.	"Schon Rosmarin"	1:54
4.	"Off To Work"	1:40
5.	"Nina's News"	1:34
6.	"The Dance Class (You Were Mean For Me)"	1:55
7.	"Father And Son"	1:04
8.	"Jolie Calls/Off To College"	4:29
9.	"The Announcement (You Were Meant For Me)"	0:40
10.	"Home From The Hamptons Part 1"	2:44
11.	"Home From The Hampstons Part 2"	1:16
12.	"Berceuse"	2:03
13.	"New Friends"	2:18
14.	"Lewis Reflects"	1:16
15.	"George Moves Out"	1:05
Total length:		28:50

=== Additional Music ===
No.	Title	Music	Length
1.	"You Were Meant for Me"	Sting	3:49
2.	"You Were Meant for Me (New York Version)"	Sting	4:11
Total length:			8:00

== See also ==
- Wanderlust, a 2012 film starring Alda, Aniston and Rudd.
