= The Easy Way Out =

- Film poster
- Directed by: Brice Cauvin
- Screenplay by: Brice Cauvin; Raphaëlle Desplechin; Agnès Jaoui
- Based on: The Easy Way Out by Stephen McCauley
- Produced by: Georges Fernandez
- Starring: Laurent Lafitte; Agnès Jaoui; Benjamin Biolay; Nicolas Bedos
- Cinematography: Marc Tevanian
- Edited by: Agathe Cauvin
- Music by: François Peyrony
- Production company: Hérodiade
- Distributed by: KMBO
- Release dates: 10 October 2014 (Festival du film de La Réunion); 4 March 2015 (France)
- Running time: 98 minutes
- Country: France
- Language: French
- Budget: $3 million
- Box office: $329.000

The Easy Way Out (French title: L'Art de la fugue) is a 2014 French comedy-drama film directed by Brice Cauvin, based on the novel The Easy Way Out by Stephen McCauley, which was published in French as L'Art de la fugue.

The plot concerns three brothers: Antoine is gay, in his mid-30s, and lives with his boyfriend Adar; Louis, the youngest, is having an affair while engaged to his high school sweetheart; and Gérard, the oldest, has separated from his wife and works for his parents in their slowly failing clothing store. Antoine introduces his friend Ariel into this family dynamic just as each of the brothers tries to come to terms with his failed or strained relationship.

== Cast ==
- Laurent Lafitte as Antoine
- Agnès Jaoui as Ariel
- Benjamin Biolay as Gérard
- Nicolas Bedos as Louis
- Bruno Putzulu as Adar
- Élodie Frégé as Julie
- Guy Marchand as Francis
- Marie-Christine Barrault as Nelly
- Didier Flamand as Chastenet
- Alice Belaïdi as Franette
- Irène Jacob as Mathilde
- Arthur Igual as Alexis
