= Double Edge (1992 film) =

- Directed by: Amos Kollek
- Written by: Amos Kollek
- Produced by: Amos Kollek; Rafi Reibenbach
- Starring: Faye Dunaway
- Cinematography: Amnon Salomon
- Edited by: David Tour; Vicki Hiatt
- Music by: Mira J. Spektor
- Distributed by: Castle Hill Productions
- Release date: September 30, 1992 (New York City)
- Running time: 81 minutes 86 minutes
- Countries: United States; Israel
- Language: English

Double Edge is a 1992 Israeli-American thriller drama film written and directed by Amos Kollek and starring Faye Dunaway.

== Cast ==
- Faye Dunaway as Faye Milano
- Amos Kollek as David
- Mohammad Bakri as Mustafa Shafik
- Makram Khoury as Ahmed Shafik
- Michael Schneider as Max
- Shmuel Shilo as Moshe
- Anat Atzmon as Censor
- Ann Belkin as Sarah
- Teddy Kollek as himself
- Abba Eban as himself
- Meir Kahane as himself
- Hanan Ashrawi as herself
- Ziad Abuzayyad as himself
- Naomi Altaraz as herself

== Release ==
The film premiered in New York City on September 30, 1992.

== Reception ==
Kevin Thomas of the Los Angeles Times gave the film a negative review, calling it a "terrible movie but fascinating as a case study in star behavior."
