= Don't Ask Me If I Love =

1971 novel by Amos Kollek

Don't Ask Me If I Love is the first novel of the Israeli film director and writer, Amos Kollek. It was first published in 1971 in New York City.

== Plot ==
The book tells the story of a young Israeli man named Assaf Ryke, the son of a wealthy manufacturer and supplier of military equipment. The novel is set in the 1960s. Despite his father's intentions to involve him in politics, he desires to become a writer. Ryke narrates part of his service in the Israeli army. During this time, he becomes friends with Ram, who unlike Assaf serves the army with restless patriotism. On one of his military leaves, he meets an American girl named Joy. He instantly becomes fond of her, though he is mostly just attracted to her physically.

== History ==
Ray Stark invited Kollek to submit a two-page film proposal. When Stark decided not to make the film, he introduced Kollek to a literary agent, and Koollek turned the book into a novel, Don't Ask Me If I Love. Don't Ask Me If I Love was published in New York and made into a film by Barbara Nobel with Kollek in the lead role. The novel is semi-autobiographical. Kollek's father Teddy Kollek said that it made him feel "caricatured." Kollek nevertheless came to New York to help promote his son's film.

Kollek was living in New York while his wife, Janet, attended law school.

The book sold 150,000 copies in paperback.

== Film ==
Worlds Apart, the English language film based on the novel, opened in 2008 with Kollek in the starring role. The film is about a young Israeli from a prominent family who is serving in the army and seeing a beautiful American who lives in and is part of a social set of Jerusalem Arabs. The low budget film, cost $1 million, received good notices at the Miami International Film Festival.
