= Mint Julep (film) =

- Directed by: Ian Teal; Kathy Fehl
- Written by: Ian Teal; Kathy Fehl
- Produced by: Ian Teal; Kathy Fehl
- Starring: David Morse; Angelica Torn; James Gandolfini
- Music by: Tommy James
- Release date: May 22, 2010 (Premiere)
- Running time: 99 minutes
- Country: United States
- Language: English
- Budget: $150,000

Mint Julep is a 2010 romance film written, directed, and produced by Ian Teal and Kathy Fehl, starring David Morse, Angelica Torn, and James Gandolfini. It is set in small-town North Carolina and follows the struggling marriage of Deirdre, a diner waitress played by Torn, and Leighton, an insurance salesman played by Teal. Morse plays an odd groundskeeper at a golf course who witnesses a murder, and Gandolfini plays a landlord in New York City.

The film's surreal aspects reflect influences from Federico Fellini, Luis Buñuel and Michelangelo Antonioni.

The independent film took more than a decade to produce due to budget constraints. Teal and Fehl spent an estimated $150,000 on the film, much of which came from their personal finances. The filmmakers received some financial backing from Marilyn Perry, an art historian, painter, and former chairwoman of the World Monuments Fund. Perry studied under Fehl's father at the University of North Carolina, where he taught art history.

The film premiered on May 22, 2010, at the Gerold Opera House in Weyauwega, Wisconsin, where Teal and Fehl run a non-profit organization called Wega Arts.

== Cast ==
- Angelica Torn as Deirdre
- Ian Teal as Leighton
- David Morse as Karl
- James Gandolfini as Mr. G
- Susan Aston as Veronica
- Johnny Mez as Gantner
- Kathy Fehl as Muriel

== Soundtrack ==
The film features an original jazz score composed by Tommy James.
