= Mira J. Spektor =

American composer and poet (1928–2021)

Mira J. Spektor (November 8, 1928 – November 28, 2021) was a German-born American composer, poet, and music director. She was the founder of the Atlantic Opera Singers and the Aviva Players.

== Biography ==
Spektor was born in Berlin in 1928 and her parents were Lithuanians that escaped the pogroms. The three of them moved out of Berlin to Paris shortly before Kristallnacht started, where Spektor went to school until the summer of 1939 when the family moved to the United States on the SS Washington.

She wrote her first musical while she was in high school and also sang in it. Spektor attended Sarah Lawrence College, Mannes School of Music, and Juilliard School, later performing in Off-Broadway plays and recording songs for LPs and CDs. The Atlantic Opera Singers was started by Spektor and lasted for 10 years.

In 1975, Spektor started The Aviva Players, a chamber music group that performed music by women composers starting from the 12th century. Record labels that released her music include Original Cast Records and Airplay. She wrote a feminist musical titled The Housewives' Cantata, which had a playbook published in 1994 by Georgina Press. She also wrote a collection of poems titled The Road to November. Her music has been played in films and television shows.

== Works ==
=== Opera and operatic works ===
| Title | Type/Designation | Date | Libretto | Notes |
|---|---|---|---|---|
| Villa Diodati | Chamber opera | Premiered 2003 under title Mary Shelley; premiered with current title at the New York Music Theater Festival in 2008. | Libretto by Colette Inez; also features poetry by Spektor, Byron, Shelley, and Wordsworth. | Depicts events of 1816 when Mary Shelley began writing Frankenstein. |
| Giovanni, the Fearless | Folk-opera; commedia dell'arte musical | Premiered in a concert reading at the Montauk Library in August 2011. | Carolyn Balducci | |
| Lady of the Castle | Chamber opera | October 7, 2017 at the National Opera Center, Marc A. Sorca Hall | Based on the play Lady of the Castle by Lea Goldberg. | |
| The Passion of Lizzie Borden | Chamber opera | 1985, Marymount Manhattan College | Based on poems by Ruth Whitman | Short opera about the Lizzie Borden murder case |
| The Housewives' Cantata | Musical | 1994 | Lyrics by June Siegel | |
