= Amos Kollek =

Israeli film director, writer and actor (born 1947)

Amos Kollek (Hebrew: עמוס קולק; born 15 September 1947) is an Israeli film director, writer and actor.

== Biography ==
Amos Kollek was born in Jerusalem. He is the son of Teddy Kollek, the long-time mayor of Jerusalem. Kollek studied psychology and philosophy at the Hebrew University of Jerusalem. He became interested in film after working as a writer. He produced his first film, Goodbye, New York, in 1985. His film Fast Food Fast Women was entered into the 2000 Cannes Film Festival.

== Filmography ==
Year	Title	Role	Notes
1979	Al Tishali Im Ani Ohev	Assaf	
1985	Goodbye, New York	David	Director
1986	Forever, Lulu (a.k.a. Crazy Streets)	Larry	Director
1989	High Stakes (a.k.a. Melanie Rose)		Director
1992	Lahav Hatzui (a.k.a. Double Edge) (a.k.a. Three Weeks in Jerusalem)	David	Director
1993	Five Girls (a.k.a. Five Lesbian Girls)		Director
1994	Whore II (a.k.a. Bad Girls)	Jack	Director
1995	Teddy Kollek (a.k.a. Teddy Kollek, from Vienna to Jerusalem)		Director, Documentary
1997	Sue (a.k.a. Sue lost in Manhattan)		Director
1998	Fiona		Director
2000	Fast Food Fast Women		Director
2001	Queenie in Love		Director
2001	A Bitter Glory		Director, TV Movie documentary
2001	Beirut		
2002	Bridget		Director
2002	Angela		Short
2003	Music		Short
2003	Happy End		
2008	Restless		Director
2008	LL		Director
2012	The Sumo Wrestler	Jack	Director

== Books (incomplete) ==
- Don't Ask Me If I Love (1971)
- After They Hang Him (1977)
- Tishali Im Ani Ohev [script for Barbara Noble Tishali Im Ani Ohev ("Worlds Apart") movie] (1980)
- Ha-Tapuah, ha-shir, veha-zahav (1980)
- Ein Leben für Jerusalem (1992)
- Approximately Clint Eastwood (1995)
- Es geschah in Gaza (1996)
