= List of longest buildings =

This is a list of the longest multiple-segment buildings and walls (excluding those not intended for human occupancy) in the world.

== World ==
No.	Building	Type	Year(s) built	Length		City	Country	Coordinates	Notes
No.	Building	Type	Year(s) built	m	ft	City	Country	Coordinates	Notes
1.	Great Wall of China	Fortification	From Spring and Autumn period to Ming dynasty	21,196,000	69,541,000	—	China	40.67693°N 117.23193°E	Notes
2.	Walls of Benin	Fortification	1450–1500	16,015,000	52,543,000	Benin City	Nigeria	6.33333°N 5.62222°E	Notes
3.	Great Wall of Gorgan	Fortification	224 to 651 AD	195,000	640,000	—	Iran		
4.	Kumbhalgarh	Fortification	15th century	36,000	118,000	—	India		
5.	Ranikot Fort	Fortification	17th century	26,000	85,000	—	Pakistan		
6.	Diyarbakır Wall	Fortification	337	6,000	20,000	Diyarbakır	Turkey		
7.	Walls of Ston	Fortification	1461	5,500	18,000	Ston	Croatia		
8.	Prora	Hotel	1936–1939	4,500	14,800	Binz	Germany	54°26′12″N 13°34′37″E	Three buildings, not connected; the longest is 750m
9.	LIGO (Laser Interferometer Gravitational-wave Observatory)	Research Facility	1994–1999	4,000	13,000	Livingston, Louisiana Hanford, Washington	United States		Length of each arm.
10.	Sighnagi wall	Fortress	18th century	4,000	13,000	Sighnagi	Georgia	41°37′7″N 45°55′18″E	The 4-kilometer-long wall integrated 28 towers, each named according to the village with which they connected the city.
10.	Government Complex, Sejong	Government building	2008–2014	3,500	11,500	Sejong City	South Korea	36°30′15″N 127°15′50″E	Six buildings interrupted by roads; none longer than 300m
11.	Klystron gallery above the Stanford Linear Accelerator	Research facility	1962–1966	3,073.72	10,084.4	Menlo Park, California	United States	37.41472°N 122.22167°W	
12.	Fenestrelle Fort	Fortification	1728–1850	3,000+	9,800	Fenestrelle	Italy	45°01′47″N 7°03′38″E	
13.	Three Gorges Dam	Dam	1994–2008	2,335	7,661		China		
14.	Modlin Fortress	Barracks	1832–1862	2,250	7,380		Poland	52°26′14″N 20°40′52″E	Two buildings, the longest 1330m
15.	Moscow Kremlin Wall	Fortification	1485–1495	2,235	7,333	Moscow	Russia	55.751667°N 37.617778°E	
16.	Dubai International Airport Cargo Gateway	Airport terminal	2008	1,774	5,820	Dubai	United Arab Emirates	25.24991°N 55.35893°E	
17.	Apartment house on Sobornosti av. and Molodi st.	Apartment house	1970-s	1,750	5,740	Lutsk	Ukraine	50.761219°N 25.368719°E	A single, connected building 1750m long
18.	Kansai International Airport	Airport terminal	1991–1994	1,700	5,600	Osaka	Japan		
19.	Red Dog Mine Conveyor Enclosure	Zinc mine conveyor enclosure	1991	1,700	5,600	Alaska	United States		
20.	McNamara Terminal Concourse A at the Detroit Metropolitan Wayne County Airport	Airport terminal	2002	1,600	5,200	Detroit, Michigan	United States		

== Africa ==
No.	Building	Type	Year(s) built	Length		City	Country	Coordinates
No.	Building	Type	Year(s) built	m	ft	City	Country	Coordinates
1.	Walls of Benin	Fortification	1450–1500	16,015,000	52,543,000	Benin City	Nigeria	6.33333°N 5.62222°E

== Asia ==
No.	Building	Type	Year(s) built	Length		Country	Coordinates	City
No.	Building	Type	Year(s) built	m	ft	Country	Coordinates	City
1.	Great Wall of China	Fortification	From Spring and Autumn period to Ming dynasty	8,851,800	29,041,300	China		—
2.	Kumbhalgarh	Fortification	15th century	36,000	118,000	India		—
3.	Ranikot Fort	Fortification	17th century	26,000	85,000	Pakistan		
4.	Diyarbakır Wall	Fortification	337	6,000	20,000	Turkey		Diyarbakır
5.	Kansai International Airport	Airport terminal	1991–1994	1,700	5,600	Japan		Osaka

== Europe ==
No.	Building	Type	Year(s) built	Length		City	Country	Coordinates	Notes
No.	Building	Type	Year(s) built	m	ft	City	Country	Coordinates	Notes
1.	Walls of Ston	Fortification	1461	5,500	18,000	Ston	Croatia		
2.	Prora	Hotel	1936–1939	4,500	14,800	Binz	Germany	54°26′12″N 13°34′37″E	Three buildings, not connected; the longest is 750m
3.	Venetian Walls of Candia	Fortification	1462–1560	4,300	14,100	Heraklion	Greece	35.331987°N 25.130427°E	
4.	Fenestrelle Fort	Fortification	1728–1850	3,000+	9,800	Fenestrelle	Italy	45°01′47″N 7°03′38″E	
5.	Modlin Fortress	Barracks	1832–1862	2,250	7,380	Nowy Dwór Mazowiecki	Poland	52°26′14″N 20°40′52″E	Two buildings, the longest 1330m
6.	Moscow Kremlin Wall	Fortification	1485–1495	2,235	7,333	Moscow	Russia	55.751667°N 37.617778°E	Longest building in Russia
7.	Apartment house on Sobornosti av. and Molodi st.	Apartment house	1970-s	1,750	5,740	Lutsk	Ukraine	50.761219°N 25.368719°E	A single, connected building 1750m long
8.	St. Kevin's Hospital	Lunatic asylum	1852	1,600	5,200	Cork	Ireland	51.896753°N 8.507266°E	
9.	Apartment house on Kolsky av. and Beringa st. (in 305th microdistrict)	Apartment house	1970-s	1,488	4,882	Murmansk	Russia	68.918002°N 33.094526°E	Longest apartment building in Russia
10.	Bymuren 1-175	Residential building	1972–1974	1,475	4,839	Hvidovre	Denmark		
11.	Apartment house on Akademika Zabolotnogo st.	Apartment house	1969–1980	1,240	4,070	Kyiv	Ukraine	50.364066°N 30.463371°E	
12.	Terminal 4 at the Madrid-Barajas Airport	Airport terminal	2006	1,175	3,855	Madrid	Spain		
13.	Karl Marx-Hof	Residential building	1927–1930	1,100	3,600	Vienna	Austria	48°15′10″N 16°21′54″E	
14.	"Le Lignon"	Residential building	1963–1971	1,060	3,480	Geneva	Switzerland	46.20317°N 6.09792°E	
15.	"Lange Jammer"; Longest skyscraper in the world 60 m high and 1,000 m long		1968–2010	1,000	3,300	Märkisches Viertel	Germany		
16.	"Corviale" is the longest with a unique body, and parallelepiped building shape	Residential building	1972–1982	1,000	3,300	Rome	Italy	41.850959°N 12.411654°E	
17.	Potroom of the Rio Tinto Alcan Aluminium Factory	Potroom		1,000	3,300	Straumsvík	Iceland	54.142391°N 13.660035°E	
18.	Blok 21 apartment complex – (official name B-7)	Apartment house		972.5	3,191	Belgrade	Serbia	44.814444°N 20.429444°E	
19.	Turbine hall of the Greifswald Nuclear Power Plant	Turbine hall		955	3,133	Lubmin	Germany	54.142391°N 13.660035°E	
20.	Falowiec	Residential building	1970–1973	860	2,820	Gdańsk	Poland		(satellite photo)
21.	"Chinese wall" (Great Wall of China)	Residential building	1971–1974	830	2,720	Dnipro	Ukraine	48.417367°N 35.061021°E	
22.	"Kilometergebäude" at Fürstenfeldbruck Air Base			820	2,690	Fürstenfeldbruck	Germany	48.197118°N 11.275449°E	
23.	Turbine hall of the Chernobyl Nuclear Power Plant	Turbine hall		803	2,635	Chernobyl	Ukraine	51.388749°N 30.106326°E	
24.	Serpentin (longest of buildings forming the) at Les Courtillières. Whole structure is over 1.1 km (0.68 mi) long in 3 buildings. Architect: Émile Aillaud.	Residential building	1955–1956	700	2,300	Pantin	France	48.912643°N 2.410716°E	
25.	Karlsborg Fortress	Fortification	1819–1870	678	2,224		Sweden		

Thermal power stations in the former Soviet Union often also have long buildings. According to Wikimapia the building of Ekibastuz GRES-1 in Kazakhstan is 537 metres (1,762 ft) long, and that of the Luhansk power station north of Shchastia, Ukraine, is 672 metres (2,205 ft) long.

== North America ==
No.	Building	Type	Year(s) built	Length		City	Country	Coordinates	Notes
No.	Building	Type	Year(s) built	m	ft	City	Country	Coordinates	Notes
1.	LIGO-Livingston	Observatory	1994–1999	4,000	13,000	Louisiana	United States		length relates to each arm
2.	Klystron gallery above the Stanford Linear Accelerator	Research facility	1962–1966	3,073.72	10,084.4	Menlo Park, California	United States	37.41472°N 122.22167°W	
3.	McNamara Terminal Concourse A at the Detroit Metropolitan Wayne County Airport	Airport terminal	2002	1,600	5,200	Detroit, Michigan	United States		
4.	Gurnee Mills	Shopping mall	1991	1,340	4,400	Gurnee, Illinois	United States		Z-shaped building measured along its winding central corridor
5.	Le Mur-Écran – The Windscreen	Mixed-use	1970	1,300	4,300	Fermont	Canada		Boomerang-shaped building. Popularly known as The Wall.
6.	Boeing Everett Factory	Airplane factory	1967	1,090	3,580	Everett, Washington	United States		
7.	Ronald Reagan Nat'l Airport Main Terminal	Airport building	1941	1,010	3,310	Arlington, Virginia	United States		
8.	Edward Hines Jr. Veterans Administration Hospital Building 1	Medical building	1921	632	2,073	Hines, Illinois	United States		
9.	US Coast Guard Air Station, Washington	Military building	1952	570	1,870	Arlington, Virginia	United States		

== Oceania ==
No.	Building	Type	Year(s) built	Length		City	Country	Coordinates	Notes
No.	Building	Type	Year(s) built	m	ft	City	Country	Coordinates	Notes
1.	Willsmere – Kew Asylum	Residential	1871	950	3,120	Kew, Victoria	Australia		
2.	Melbourne Convention and Exhibition Centre	Exhibition centre	1996	450	1,480	Melbourne, Victoria	Australia		
3.	The Great Southern Stand at the Melbourne Cricket Ground	Stadium	1996	400	1,300	Melbourne, Victoria	Australia		
4.	Sydney Convention and Exhibition Centre	Exhibition centre	1988	310	1,020	Sydney, New South Wales	Australia		
5.	Flinders Street station	Railway station	1910	280	920	Melbourne, Victoria	Australia		

== South America ==
No.	Building	Type	Year(s) built	Length		City	Country	Coordinates	Notes
No.	Building	Type	Year(s) built	m	ft	City	Country	Coordinates	Notes
1.	Central Institute of Sciences (ICC) of the University of Brasília	University	1961	750	2,460	Brasília, Federal District (Brazil)	Brazil	15.763369°S 47.869451°W	
2.	Edificio Caliche, Conjunto Habitacional Gran Vía – Caliche Building, Gran Vía housing complex	Residential	1970–1974	680	2,230	Antofagasta	Chile	23.676206°S 70.403977°W	
3.	Edificio Huanchaca (Curvo), Conjunto Habitacional Gran Vía – Huanchaca Building, Gran Vía housing complex	Residential	1967–1969	380	1,250	Antofagasta	Chile	23.675306°S 70.404271°W	
4.	Minhocão de Guadalupe – Guadalupe's Big Earthworm	Residential	1950	320	1,050	Guadalupe, Rio de Janeiro	Brazil	22.979658°S 43.230245°W	
5.	Plataforma Gubernamental de Gestión Financiera	Public service	2017	310	1,020	Quito, Metropolitan District of Quito	Ecuador		
6.	Conjunto Residencial Alcalde Mendes de Moraes (Pedregulho)	Residential	1947	270	890	Rio de Janeiro, São Cristóvão Neighborhood	Brazil		

== Middle East ==
No.	Building	Type	Year(s) built	Length		City	Country	Coordinates	Notes
No.	Building	Type	Year(s) built	m	ft	City	Country	Coordinates	Notes
1.	Great Wall of Gorgan	Fortification	224-651 AD	195,000	640,000	–	Iran		
2.	Terminal 3, Concourse B at the Dubai International Airport	Airport terminal	2008	924	3,031	Dubai	United Arab Emirates		

== See also ==
- List of buildings and structures
- List of tallest buildings and structures in the world
- Longest fence in the world
