= East Ferry (disambiguation) =

East Ferry may refer to a number of places, including:

- East Ferry, a village and civil parish in Lincolnshire, England
- East Ferry, County Cork, a residential area on Cork Harbour, Ireland
- East Ferry, Nova Scotia, a community in Digby County, Canada
- East Ferry Avenue Historic District, a district in Detroit, Michigan
