= Givaudan =

Swiss manufacturer of flavors, fragrances, cosmetic ingredients

Givaudan S.A.

- Givaudan's headquarters in Vernier, Switzerland
- Type: Public
- Traded as: SIX: GIVN; SMI component
- ISIN: CH0010645932
- Industry: Flavours and fragrance
- Founded: 1895; 131 years ago in Zurich
- Founder: Léon and Xavier Givaudan
- Headquarters: Vernier, canton of Geneva, Switzerland
- Number of locations: 162 Locations worldwide
- Key people: Christian Stammkoetter (CEO)
- Products: Taste & Wellbeing and Fragrance and Beauty
- Revenue: ▲SFr 7,472 million (2025)
- Operating income: ▼SFr 1,381 million (2025)
- Net income: ▼SFr 1,071 million (2025)
- Total assets: ▼SFr 11,864 million (2025)
- Total equity: ▼SFr 4,537 million (2025)
- Number of employees: 17,580 (2025)
- Website: www.givaudan.com
- Footnotes: Financials as of 31 December 2025

Givaudan S.A. (pronounced [ʒivodɑ̃]) is a Swiss multinational manufacturer of flavours, fragrances and active cosmetic ingredients. As of 2025, it was the world's largest company in the flavour and fragrance industry.

== Overview ==
The company's scents and flavours are developed for food and beverage makers, and also used in household goods, as well as grooming and personal care products and perfumes.

The company has two business segments, "Taste & Wellbeing", pertaining to the manufacture of flavors for the food and beverage industry; and "Fragrance & Beauty", which manufactures fragrances for cosmetics, household products, personal care products, and fine fragrance, in addition to fragrance ingredients.

Givaudan's flavours and fragrances are usually custom-made and sold under confidentiality agreements. Givaudan uses a patented technology that captures the chemical makeup of smell from living plants. The company has locations in Europe, Africa and the Middle East, North America, Latin America and Asia Pacific. In 2025, Givaudan had sales of CHF 7.4 billion. It is one of Switzerland's 30 biggest listed companies in terms of market capitalization.

Givaudan is a member of the European Flavour Association. Major competitors include Firmenich, International Flavors and Fragrances and Symrise.

== History ==
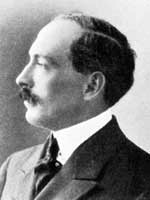
Portrait of Léon Givaudan

The Givaudan factory in Vernier (photograph dated between 1918 and 1930)

Givaudan was founded as a perfumery company in 1895 in Zurich, Switzerland by Léon and Xavier Givaudan. Through businesses that were later incorporated into the group, its broader historical roots have been traced to the perfumery activities of Antoine Chiris in Grasse in 1768. Another branch of the group’s history derives from the American fragrance and flavour house Dodge & Olcott, established in 1796 and merged into Givaudan through Fritzsche, Dodge & Olcott in the 1990s.

In 1898, Givaudan moved to Geneva, Switzerland and constructed a factory in Vernier. In 1946, Givaudan opened a perfumery school, which trained a third of the world's creative perfumers. In 1948 the company acquired Ersolko SA, which transitioned Givaudan also into the flavor industry. In 1963, Givaudan was acquired by Roche and in 1964, Roche acquired one of Givaudan's competitors, Roure. Roure was founded in Grasse, France during 1820. In 1937 Roure created the first designer perfume: Shocking for Schiaparelli. Givaudan's original United States fragrance headquarters, in Teaneck, New Jersey, was built in 1972 from a design by Der Scutt, architect of the Trump Tower. The company later moved to East Hanover, New Jersey.

=== Givaudan-Roure ===
In 1991 Givaudan and Roure were merged to form Givaudan-Roure. Also in 1991, the company bought Fritzsche, Dodge and Olcott. In 1997 Givaudan-Roure acquired another flavor company, Tastemaker, based in Cincinnati, Ohio. The merger made Givaudan the largest flavor company in the world. In 2000 Givaudan-Roure was spun off by Roche as Givaudan and listed on the Swiss Stock Exchange (Code GIVN.VX) where it is part of the SMI, SLI and SPI.

=== 2000s ===
In 2002 Givaudan acquired FIS, the flavors division of Nestle, for which Nestle received a 10% stake in the company. The following year, Givaudan purchased the cheese flavor company IBF. In 2004 the company expanded its operations in China, which had been in place since the 1990s.

On 22 November 2006, Givaudan announced the acquisition of Quest International to be completed Q1 2007. On 21 February 2007, the EU approved the merger of Givaudan and Quest, clearing the final regulatory hurdle for the merger after the United States authorities approved the merger earlier in the month. The merger deal closed on 2 March 2007. The acquisition makes Givaudan the global leader in both fine fragrances and consumer products; it was already the global leader in flavors and the acquisition of Quest International strengthens their position.

In 2013 Nestle sold its share in Givaudan for $1.3 billion. By 2014 the company had about US$4.6 billion in revenues. That year, the company had its first acquisition since Quest, purchasing Soliance. Givaudan also released the TasteSolutions Richness line of flavors. It also launched the Givaudan Foundation, and has a programme that works with patchouli and other grower collection networks to establish sustainable development practices, called the Innovative Naturals programme.

Since 2014, Givaudan had acquired around 20 companies, among them Naturex, the cosmetics business of AMSilk, Albert Vieille, Fragrance Oils, and Golden Frog.

In 2021, Givaudan acquired Louisville, Ky.-based dye and coloring manufacturer D.D. Williamson.

In 2022, Givaudan, the mechanical engineering company Bühler, and Migros wanted to open the Cultured Food Innovation Hub in Kemptthal. Research was also to be carried out there on cultivated meat.

On March 7, 2023, Givaudan confirmed that it was the target of an industry-wide investigation by European and Swiss authorities. Investigators were looking into a possible cartel in the supply of fragrances and fragrance ingredients. Companies face fines as much as 10% of their global turnover for violating EU antitrust rules.

In 2024, Givaudan announced a partnership with Chinese e-retailer TMall to support growing local demand for fragrance products.

In 2026, Givaudan joined a 10-year Virtual Power Purchase Agreement (VPPA) with PepsiCo, Smurfit Westrock, and Statkraft. The agreement is linked to the repowering of a wind farm in Spain. The companies said the agreement was intended to support renewable electricity procurement and value-chain decarbonisation across Europe.

== Givaudan incidents ==
On July 10, 1976, the Seveso accident, Italy's worst ecological disaster, released a toxic cloud into the atmosphere. Italy's highest court awarded moral damages to the residents for anxiety incurred. Givaudan, the parent company of ICMESA paid EUR103.9 million (US$90.3 million) in cleanup costs and compensation to those who suffered physical injuries as a result of the incident.

In November 2024, an explosion occurred at the Louisville, Kentucky Givaudan Sense Color (formerly D.D. Williamson). Two workers died as a result of the explosion, and a dozen were injured.
