= Aïre =

Coordinates: 46°11′56″N 6°06′07″E

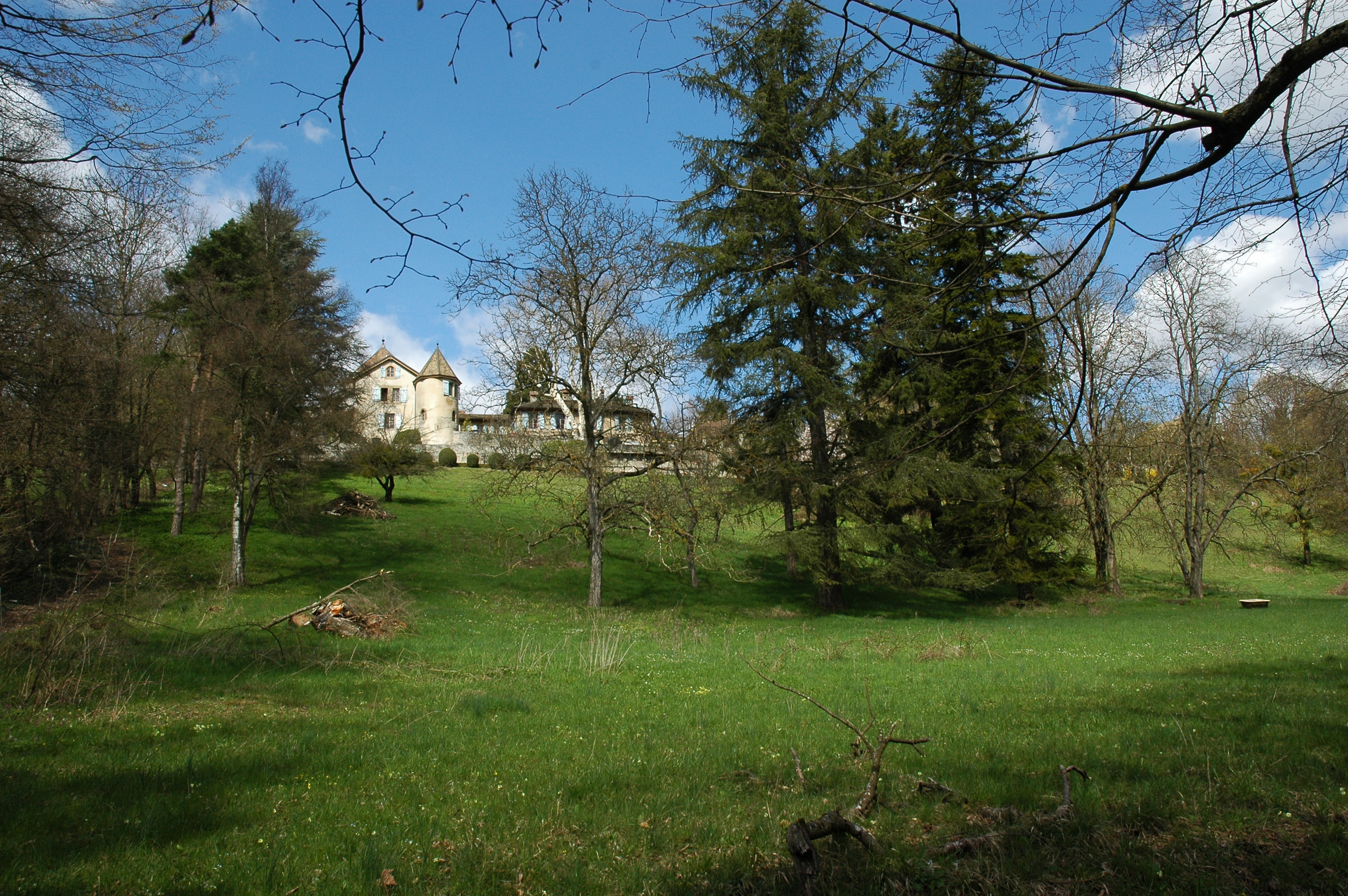
Castle of Aïre seen from the path near the Rhone.

Aïre is a small locality in the Canton of Geneva. It is on the North bank of the river Rhone. It is near Le Lignon, a 1km long block of flats.

== Tourist information ==
Aïre is run by the mairie in Vernier Village. Aïre's postcode is 1219. It has one restaurant, the Taverne du Valais. The main roads are: Avenue d'Aïre, Route d'Aire and Chemin des Sellières, where stands the Taverne du Valais. Aïre is about 5km from the centre of Geneva. There is also a paper shop with a cafe, superette and post office on the Route d'Aïre, but most necessities can be found in the Lignon shopping centre.

== Education ==
Three public schools, École d'Aïre, École des Libellules and Cycle d'Orientation du Renard serve moyenne and élémentaire levels.

== Sports ==
=== Football ===
FC Aïre-Le-Lignon is an amateur football club created in 1964, affiliated with the Association Cantonale Genevoise de Football (ACGF). The club has a small bar, two main football pitches, and one small one. The men's first team plays in the Swiss "2nd league" (5th division), and the women's team, created in 2004, is currently in the 2nd interregional league.

=== Tennis and badminton ===
The Tennis Club d'Aïre, which is part of the Tennis Club de Vernier, has four outdoor and one indoor tennis courts and five indoor badminton courts.
