= Léon Givaudan =

- Born: Emmanuel Léon Givaudan; 12 January 1875; Caluire-et-Cuire, Rhône, France
- Died: 25 March 1936 (aged 61); Neuilly-sur-Seine, Île-de-France, France
- Occupations: Chemist, entrepreneur
- Known for: Founder of Givaudan
- Spouses: Lillian May Noetzli Maclise; Anne Marie Henriette Eugénie Adèle de Ville
- Parent(s): Evariste André Givaudan; Marie Thérèse Aurore Givaudan
- Relatives: Xavier Givaudan (brother)

Léon Givaudan (12 January 1875 – 25 March 1936) was a French chemist and entrepreneur who founded the perfume and flavor company Givaudan. He established the company's operations in Switzerland, where it became a major producer of essential oils and synthetic perfumes.

== Early life and education ==
Léon Givaudan was born on 12 January 1875 in Caluire-et-Cuire, a commune in the Rhône department of France. He was the son of Evariste André Givaudan and Marie Thérèse Aurore Givaudan (née Givaudan), and the brother of Xavier Givaudan. Givaudan studied chemistry in Lyon and Zurich.

== Career ==
From 1895, Givaudan began manufacturing essential oils and synthetic perfumes in a makeshift laboratory in Zurich. In 1898, he leased 6,200 square metres from the city of Geneva. The following year, in 1899, the Givaudan company established itself in Vernier, on the banks of the Rhône, near the Chèvres plant, the first major hydroelectric installation in the region.

The first products manufactured by Givaudan aimed to achieve maximum olfactory purity. These included benzyl alcohol, cinnamic alcohol, and various acetates. The company focused on producing high-quality chemical compounds for use in perfumery and the cosmetics industry.

In 1914, Givaudan was mobilized into the French Army during World War I. During his military service, he brought his brother Xavier Givaudan to Switzerland to manage the company in his absence. At the end of the war, Léon Givaudan moved to Paris, where he remained for the rest of his life.

== Personal life ==
Givaudan was Catholic and married twice: first to Lillian May Noetzli Maclise, and later to Anne Marie Henriette Eugénie Adèle de Ville.

== Death ==
Léon Givaudan died on 25 March 1936 in Neuilly-sur-Seine, Île-de-France, France.

== Bibliography ==
- Buhart, Laure: «Les flacons de la séduction», in: L'Estampille-L'objet d'art, 263, 1992, pp. 68–75.
