= Xavier Givaudan =

- Born: 8 February 1867; Caluire, Rhône-Alpes, France
- Died: 16 July 1966 (aged 99); Geneva, Switzerland
- Occupations: Pharmacist, industrialist
- Known for: Leadership of Givaudan
- Spouse: Marie Tournaire
- Relatives: Léon Givaudan (brother)

Xavier Givaudan (8 February 1867 – 16 July 1966) was a French pharmacist and industrialist who played a central role in the development of the Givaudan company in Geneva. He led the family enterprise during World War I and contributed significantly to its expansion in Switzerland.

== Early life and education ==
Xavier Givaudan was born on 8 February 1867 in Caluire in the Rhône-Alpes region of France. He was the son of Evariste André Givaudan and Marie Thérèse Aurore Givaudan. He was the brother of Léon Givaudan. Givaudan married Marie Tournaire and studied pharmacy.

== Career ==
From 1895, Givaudan devoted himself to the manufacture of pharmaceutical products in Lyon and Zurich. He supported his brother Léon in his research on essential oils and synthetic perfumes. In 1898, Givaudan moved to Zurich, Switzerland, and built a factory in Vernier. When Léon was called up to serve in the French Army in 1914, Xavier replaced him at the head of the Givaudan enterprise in Vernier. He settled permanently in Geneva in 1916 and subsequently gave great impetus both to the family enterprise and to the French community in the city.

== Community involvement ==
From 1939 to 1945, Givaudan presided over the Société de secours aux familles de mobilisés français, an organization providing assistance to families of mobilized French soldiers. He served as president of the Chambre de commerce française pour la Suisse (French Chamber of Commerce for Switzerland) and of the board of directors of the Journal français.

== Honours ==
Givaudan was made a Commandeur de la Légion d'honneur. He received an honorary doctorate in economic and social sciences from the University of Geneva.

== Death ==
Xavier Givaudan died in Geneva on 16 July 1966 at the age of 99.

== Bibliography ==
- L. Givaudan, ed., Quintessences, 1946
