= D.D. Williamson =

US company

DDW, The Color House
- Founded: 1865; 161 years ago
- Founder: Douw Ditmars Williamson
- Headquarters: Louisville, Kentucky, U.S.
- Products: Food coloring
- Parent: Givaudan
- Website: DD Williamson

DDW, The Color House (D.D. Williamson) was a global, privately held corporation providing caramel color, burnt sugar and natural colorings for the food and beverage industry, before being acquired in 2021 by Givaudan. In 1865, Dutch immigrant Douw Ditmars Williamson founded D.D. Williamson in New York to manufacture burnt sugars for the brewing industry. The caramel industry moved into coloring cola and many other foods following Prohibition and the Great Depression.

Headquartered in Louisville, Kentucky, DDW had nine manufacturing sites for naturally derived coloring on five continents with customers in 100 countries. DDW's first international manufacturing facility was founded in Little Island, Cork.

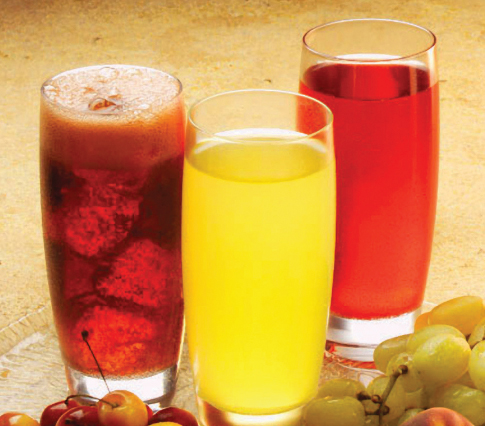
Beverages containing naturally derived food coloring

In 2013, DD Williamson acquired Dupont's Danisco line of natural coloring in yellow, orange and brown hues.

In April 2003, an explosion at the Louisville plant exploded killing one operator and releasing 26,000 pounds of aqua ammonia. In November 2024, the Givaudan Sense Color (formerly D.D. Williamson) factory in Louisville exploded, killing two people.
