= Quest International =

Flavor and fragrances company

- Industry: Flavours and Fragrance
- Founded: 1905
- Defunct: 2007
- Fate: Acquired by Givaudan S.A.
- Successor: Givaudan S.A.
- Headquarters: Naarden, Netherlands and Ashford, Kent
- Key people: Charles Knott (Chairman and CEO)

Quest International was a major producer of flavors, fragrances and food ingredients with sales of £560 million in 2005 before its acquisition by rival Givaudan. Quest created and marketed flavours and fragrance concepts and solutions for the fast-moving consumer goods industries. With operations in 31 countries, Quest made ingredients for foods, snacks, beverages, personal care, fine fragrances, and home hygiene products.

Quest Flavours and Food Ingredients was headquartered in Naarden, Netherlands; Quest Fragrances was based in Ashford, Kent, UK.

Major competitors included Firmenich, Givaudan, International Flavors and Fragrances and Symrise.

== History ==
Some highlights in the 100-year history of Quest include -

1905 N.V. Chemische Fabriek "Naarden" is established. It is to become widely known simply as "Naarden", the name of the nearby ancient fortress town. In English, the name is Chemical Factory Naarden (CFN). The company starts operations with 14 employees at the site of a former sugar beet factory, making glycerine for South Africa (glycerine was used in a wide range of industries, including explosives, paints, food and drinks). The company soon hit financial problems and for the next few years survives by distilling caraway seeds and other materials for essential oils. The manufacture of aromatic chemicals from which essences and perfume compounds emerged - the basis of the future industry on which the company was to flourish and become today's Quest International.

1908 Willem A van Dorp joins as manager of CFN at the age of 26. He and his son - also named W A van Dorp - were to have a huge impact on the future of the company by adopting more modern approaches to chemistry.

1910 CFN exhibited at a Brussels fair with an ornate display case of products.

1914 At the outbreak of the first world war, CFN produced 5,000 tons of glycerine a year that was to be exported to Britain, which took over the existing contract to South Africa because of the war. Holland was officially neutral during the conflict and CFN survived to expand into additional areas - some successful, some not. It linked up with a dye-making concern with disastrous consequences and the company's financial situation in the 1920s became extremely difficult.

1939 The second world war forces production of glycerine at CFN to a trickle and while times are difficult, the factory concentrates of anti-oxidants which are essential for food preservation. Flavourings and vitamin C are also produced (at one stage, staff collected wood from the countryside to keep the factory's boilers going).

1940 CFN's first subsidiary, Naarden-Belgium Ltd, is established. It was the first of an increasing number of subsidiaries to be formed in the post-war years as the company expanded.

1953 W A van Dorp senior retired after having been managing director since 1916. His son, also W A van Dorp, a qualified lawyer who had been joint managing director since 1949, became general managing director.

1955 The 50th anniversary of operations at Naarden is celebrated. A dinner attended by 1,000 employees and their partners is held, as well as a visit to the seaside via 25 buses decorated with flags.

1959 The first Works Council is established.

1963 Between 1959 and 1963, CFN's turnover had risen by 41 per cent. Seventy per cent of this turnover is in foreign markets.

1964 Queen Juliana invites company representatives to her birthday celebrations. At the end of the year, protracted negotiations end successfully with the acquisition of American Flavorex Co Inc of Baltimore and Los Angeles.

1965 The company on its 60th anniversary has 21 subsidiary companies, including 10 in Europe, 5 in Asia and 3 in America. It supplies 160 different fields of industry. A sculpture to mark the anniversary - depicting "working together" - is unveiled in the town within the Naarden Vesting, or fortress. At this time, for every two employees engaged in production at Naarden, three were in the laboratories, two were in marketing, two were in technical, and three were in administrative. There were about 180 employees at Naarden, compared with 100 in 1955.

1966 CFN's first Corporate Conference is held. It was nicknamed the "Vatican Council".

1967 Fragrance activities are started in the USA.

1968 Van Leepen & Co is acquired and a subsidiary is launched in Italy. Also in the same year, caffeine production is stopped because of high raw materials costs and Coca-Cola now has its own supplies. This marks a retreat by Naarden from the bulk sector. Flavourings and scents are to become the focus.

1969 An installation for the production of aroma chemicals is commissioned at Naarden.

1970 Mr Van Dorp senior dies. Glycerine distillation ends, marking the completion of the move to scents and flavourings. The first employee shareholding programme is launched.

1972 The partnership structure of the company is changed so that N.V. Chemische Fabriek "Naarden" becomes a holding company, Naarden International N.V.

1983 Mr van Dorp junior steps down as chairman of the Supervisory Board, ending a long link with the van Dorp family.

1986 The number of employees at Naarden International reaches over 2,500.

1987 Unilever acquires Naarden International and merges it with PPF - Quest International is born. The Q device is created, symbolising the globe and compass. The main production of fragrances is moved to Ashford in the UK. PPF (Proprietary Perfume and Flavours) had previously been formed from an early company PPL (Proprietary Perfumes Limited) having merged with FIL (Food Industries Limited) in Bromborough Port. That company had a long history on South East England having originally moved from Bermondsey in South East London to a new purpose built factory at Ashford which also accommodated another Unilever Company - Batchelors Foods.

1993-1996 A large number of small specialist companies are acquired, strengthening the product and technology portfolio of fragrances, flavourings and food ingredients.

1997 UK-based chemicals company ICI (Imperial Chemical Industries) acquires Quest International from Unilever as part of its move to the specialty end of the chemicals spectrum.

2004 Ireland based Kerry Group acquires the Food Ingredient Division

2005 Quest International celebrates its 100th anniversary.

2006 Quest introduces a new corporate identity and branding, relaunching itself as a company that 'creates what captivates' with a global advertising programme using a 'black and white' theme. ICI announces the intended sale of Quest International to Givaudan, with expected completion in Q1 2007.

2007 The acquisition form ICI of Quest by Givaudan closed on 2 March 2007. Quest was completely integrated into Givaudan and ceased to exist as a separate company.
