= Our Lady's Hospital, Cork =

Former psychiatric hospital in County Cork, Ireland

Our Lady's Hospital
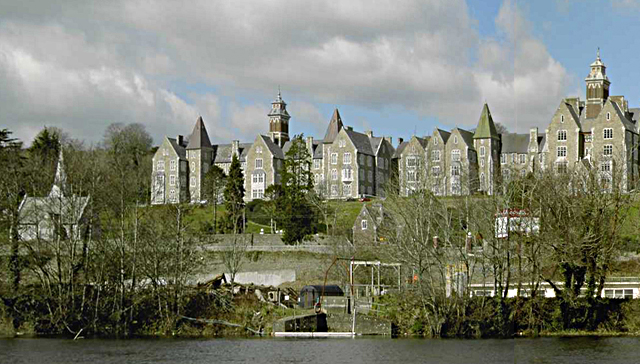
- Our Lady's Hospital

- Shown in Ireland

Geography
- Location: Cork, County Cork, Ireland
- Coordinates: 51.89656°N 8.51371°W

Organisation
- Care system: HSE
- Type: Specialist

Services
- Speciality: Psychiatric Hospital

History
- Founded: 1852
- Closed: 1992

Our Lady's Hospital (Irish: Ospidéal Mhuire) was a psychiatric hospital in Cork, County Cork, Ireland.

== History ==
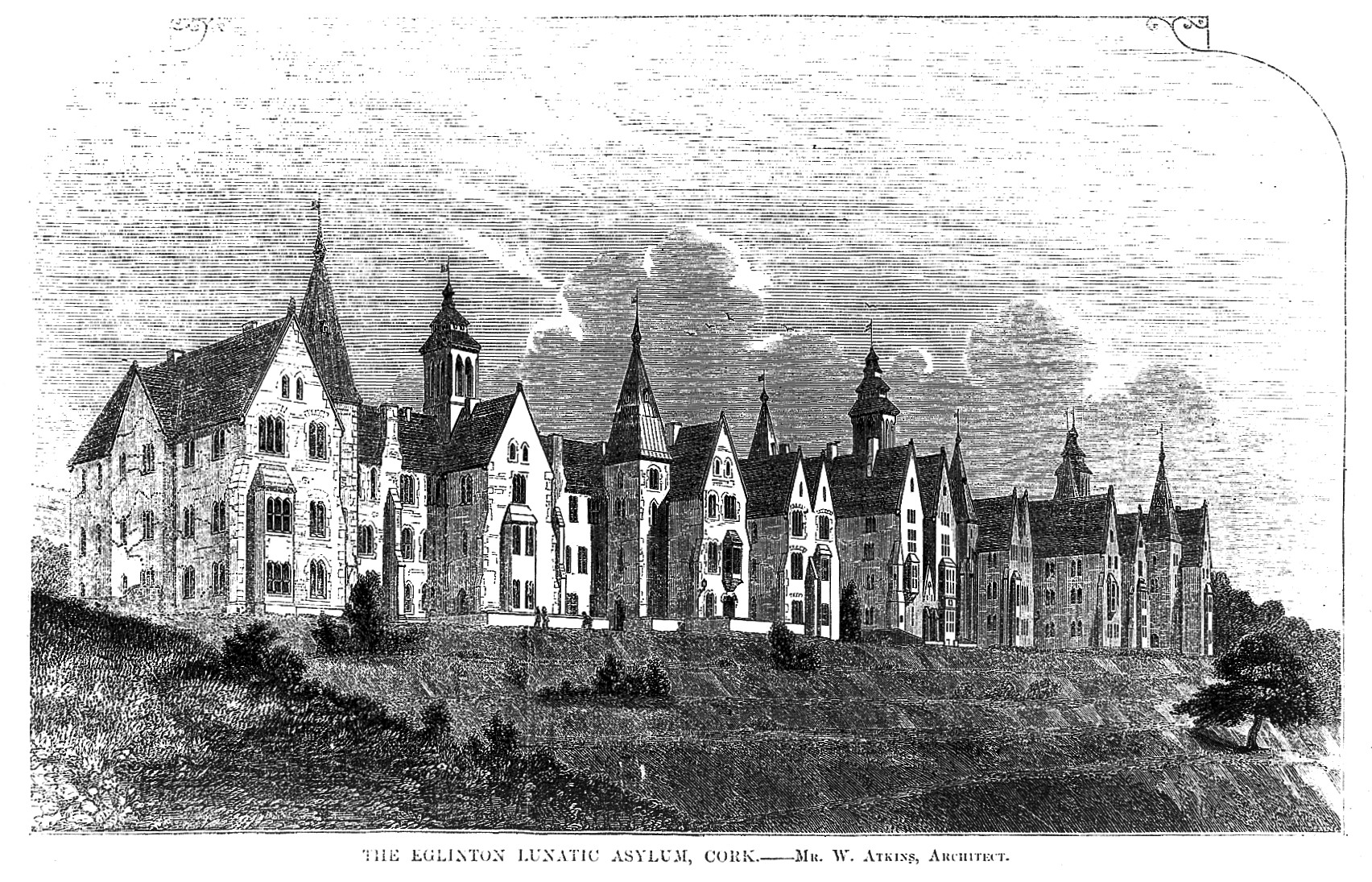
Eglinton Lunatic Asylum shortly after it opened

The hospital has its origins in a facility built in Old Blackrock Road close to present site of the South Infirmary in 1791. The facility joined the state system as a "district asylum", as defined in the Lunacy (Ireland) Act 1821, in 1845.

In the late 1840s, a site in Shanakiel was identified for the construction of new hospital of sufficient size to meet the increasing requirements of the City. The new hospital, which was designed by William Atkins in the Gothic revival style and built by Alex Dean, was named after the Earl of Eglington, the Lord Lieutenant of Ireland. It accordingly opened as the Eglinton Lunatic Asylum in 1852. A chapel was added in November 1885, to the designs of William Henry Hill. An annex, which subsequently became known as St. Kevin's Hospital, was built to the east of the main structure in the late 1890s.

The main facility became the Cork District Mental Hospital in 1926 and Our Lady's Psychiatric Hospital in 1952. After the introduction of deinstitutionalisation in the late 1980s the hospital went into a period of decline. It closed in 1992 and was subsequently converted for residential use as Atkins Hall; the building is currently owned by Urban Green Private, who own the Marina Market.
