= William Atkins (architect) =

Irish architect (c.1811–1887)

William Atkins (c.1811–1887) was an Irish architect of the Victorian era. He was born in County Cork, and was reputedly apprenticed to architect (and his uncle by marriage) George Richard Pain.

== Works ==
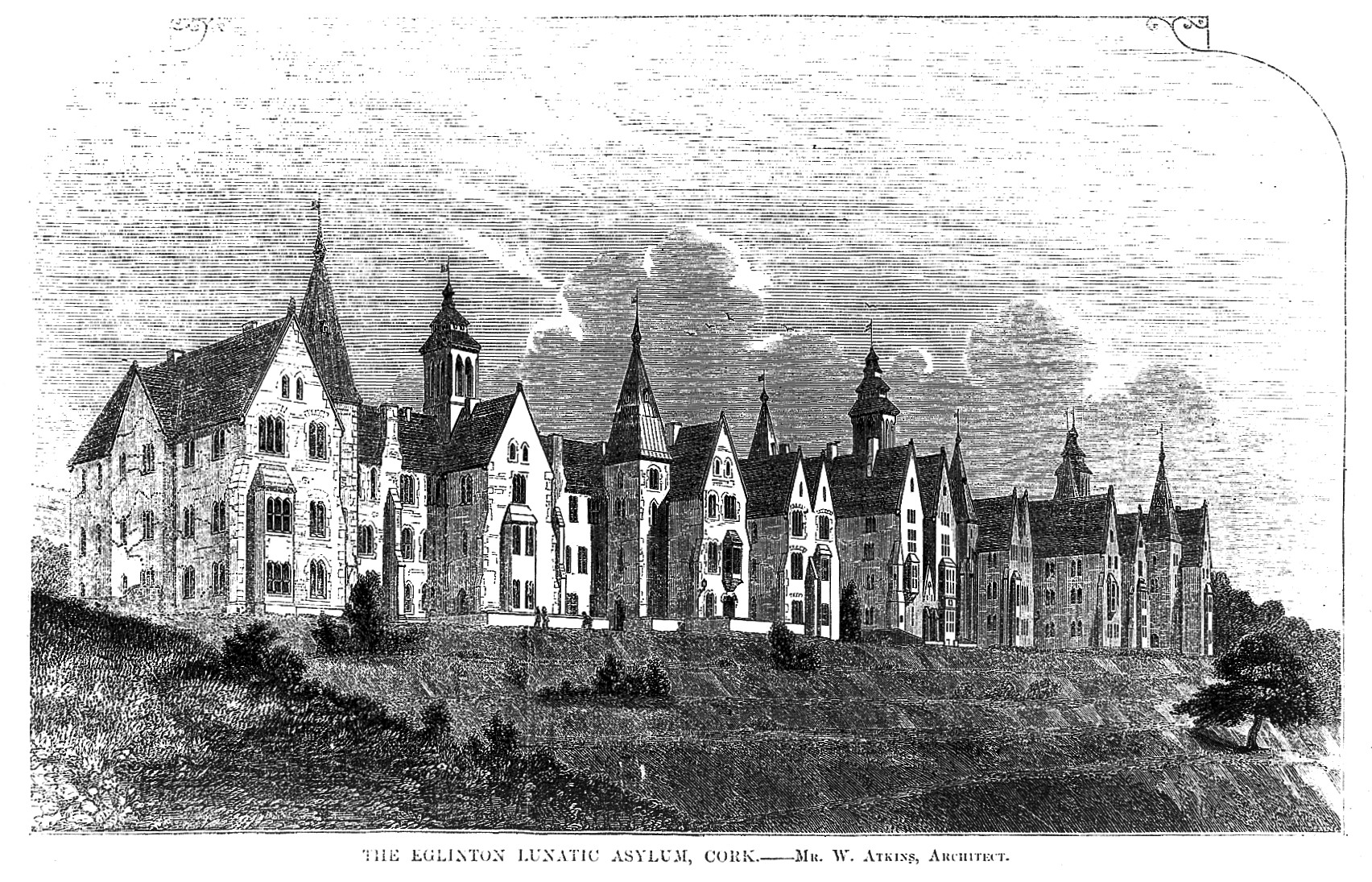
Eglinton Lunatic Asylum (latterly known as Our Lady's Hospital and Atkins' Hall) was built to designs by William Atkins in the mid 19th century

In 1846 Atkins received one of the largest public commissions in Cork city, to build the Cork City and County Asylum. This commission, commonly and latterly known as Our Lady's Hospital, Cork, was received from the Board of Works. It was being angled for, at the time, by the more established Cork architect Thomas Deane who was then engaged in the building of Queen's College Cork. Built in a revival Gothic style between 1846 and 1853, this is popularly held to have the longest corridor in all of Europe. The building was partly converted into an apartment development known as "Atkin's Hall".

Atkins' other works include:

- Funerary Chapel (1845) at Mount Jerome Cemetery Dublin, the first Puginian Gothic church in Dublin.
- St Mary's Priory in Cork (1850), which is in a Ruskinian neo-Romanesque style.
- Oak Park (1857–60), a private dwelling house near Tralee, County Kerry.
- Muckross Estate (1857) additions of a porte-cochère, gatehouse and other works on the estate.
- Father Mathew Statue (1864); base designed by Atkins, statue itself by John Henry Foley.
- Holy Trinity Church (1867) in East Ferry, County Cork.
- St. Michael and All Angels church (1881), in Corkbeg parish, Whitegate, County Cork.

He also received the first prize for a design for a new town hall for Cork in 1851, although this was never built.

== See also ==
- List of public art in Cork city
