= Louisville factory explosion =

2024 explosion in the US state of Kentucky

- Date: November 12, 2024
- Time: c. 3 p.m. (EST)
- Location: Louisville, Kentucky, US; 38°15′13″N 85°42′47″W
- Deaths: 2
- Injuries: 12

On November 12, 2024, at around 3 p.m., an explosion at a manufacturing facility for food coloring in Louisville, Kentucky killed two people and injured 12 workers. Injured people, two of whom were in critical condition, were transported to University of Louisville Hospital and Baptist East Hospital. As of November 13, The cause of the explosion is not known.

== Background ==
Givaudan Color Sense, the plant operator, is a food coloring brand associated with the international Swiss manufacturer Givaudan. The facility was previously owned and operated by D.D. Williamson & Co. (DDW).

The facility was the site of another explosion in April 2003, when, while owned by DDW, one person was killed after a process vessel became overpressurized and catastrophically failed.

In May 2023, the plant was cited by the Louisville Air Pollution Control District for failing to provide compliance reports for air quality control operations. In December of the same year, the plant was cited again for releasing excessive amounts of food coloring powder into the air, which landed on neighboring properties. For years prior to the explosion, neighbors complained of strange smells coming from the facility.

== Explosion ==
At around 3 p.m., on November 12, 2024, an explosion at the facility caused a partial collapse and shattered the windows of nearby buildings. Emergency services quickly responded to the explosion, which was declared a hazardous materials incident. A shelter in place was issued for a 1-mile radius from the area, and an evacuation order for the adjacent two blocks. At 4:40 p.m., the shelter-in-place was lifted.

== CSB investigation ==
"The CSB concludes that the Reactor 6 emergency pressure relief system functioned as designed but was undersized for the accelerated sugar decomposition reaction that occurred on the day of the incident. As a result of the emergency pressure relief system’s inadequate size, the gases and pressure generated by the accelerated decomposition reaction could not be adequately relieved from the reactor, and the reactor’s internal pressure continued to rise from the formation and heating of the gases until Reactor 6 ruptured from the runaway reaction. To prevent the Reactor 6 rupture, the existing emergency pressure relief system (pressure relief valve with rupture disc) would have needed to be four times larger. Alternatively, calculations and modeling software show that a 4-inch rupture disc alone should have provided the necessary relief capacity to prevent the rupture of Reactor 6."
