= Deutsche Schule Genf =

- École Allemande de Genève

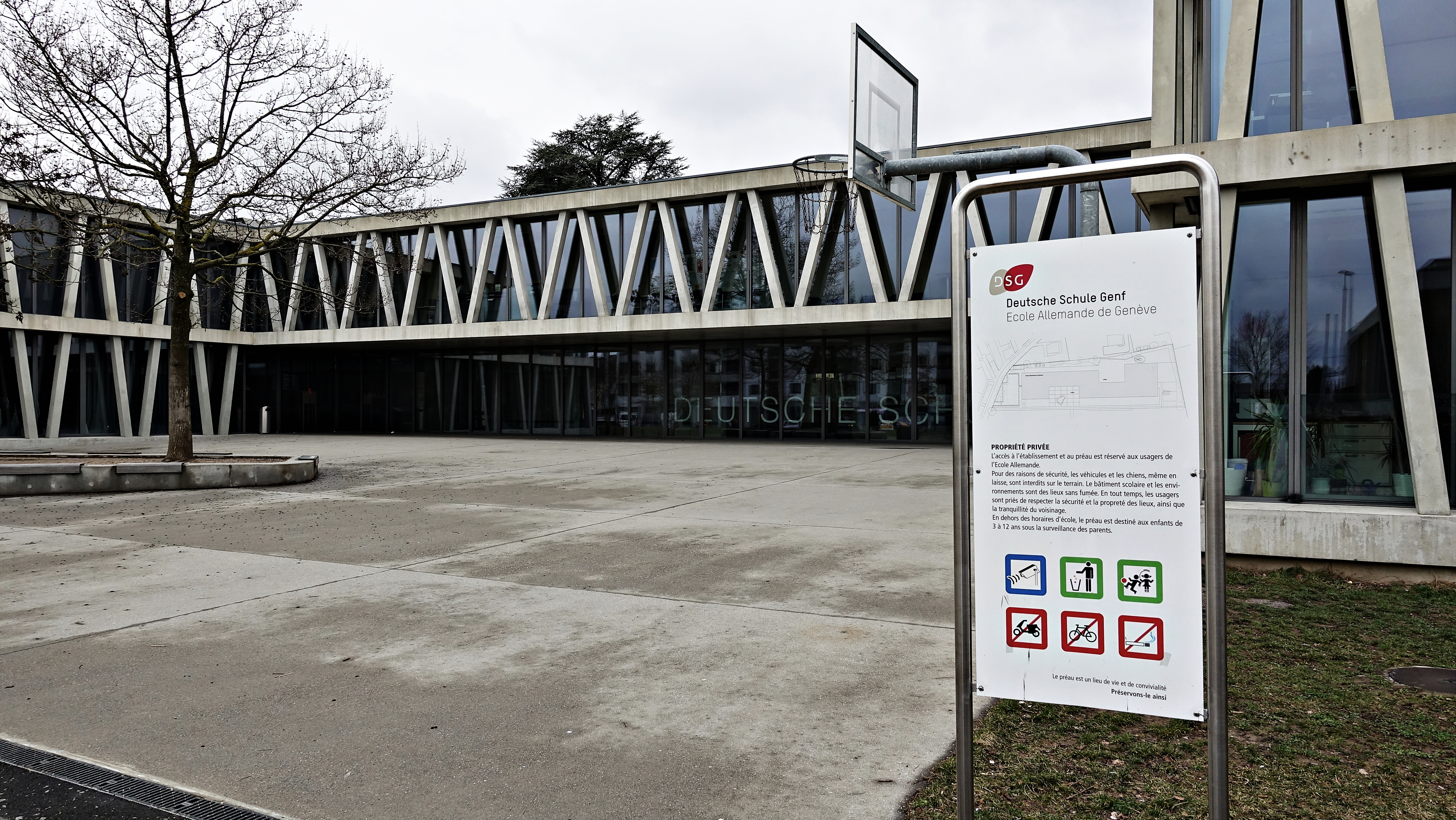
- Deutsche Schule Genf

Location
- 6, Ch. Champ-Claude; CH - 1214 Vernier; Vernier; Switzerland
- Coordinates: 46.2182°N 6.0875°E

Information
- Grades: Kindergarten through Sekundarstufe II

Deutsche Schule Genf (DSG; French: École Allemande de Genève) is a German international school in Vernier, Switzerland, in the Geneva metropolitan area. It serves levels Kindergarten through Sekundarstufe II (Oberstufe).

== Accreditation ==
DSG's (upper) secondary education (Middle and High School) is not approved as a Mittelschule/Collège/Liceo by the Swiss Federal State Secretariat for Education, Research and Innovation (SERI).
