= Holy Trinity Church, East Ferry =

Gothic Revival Anglican church in Cork, Ireland

Holy Trinity
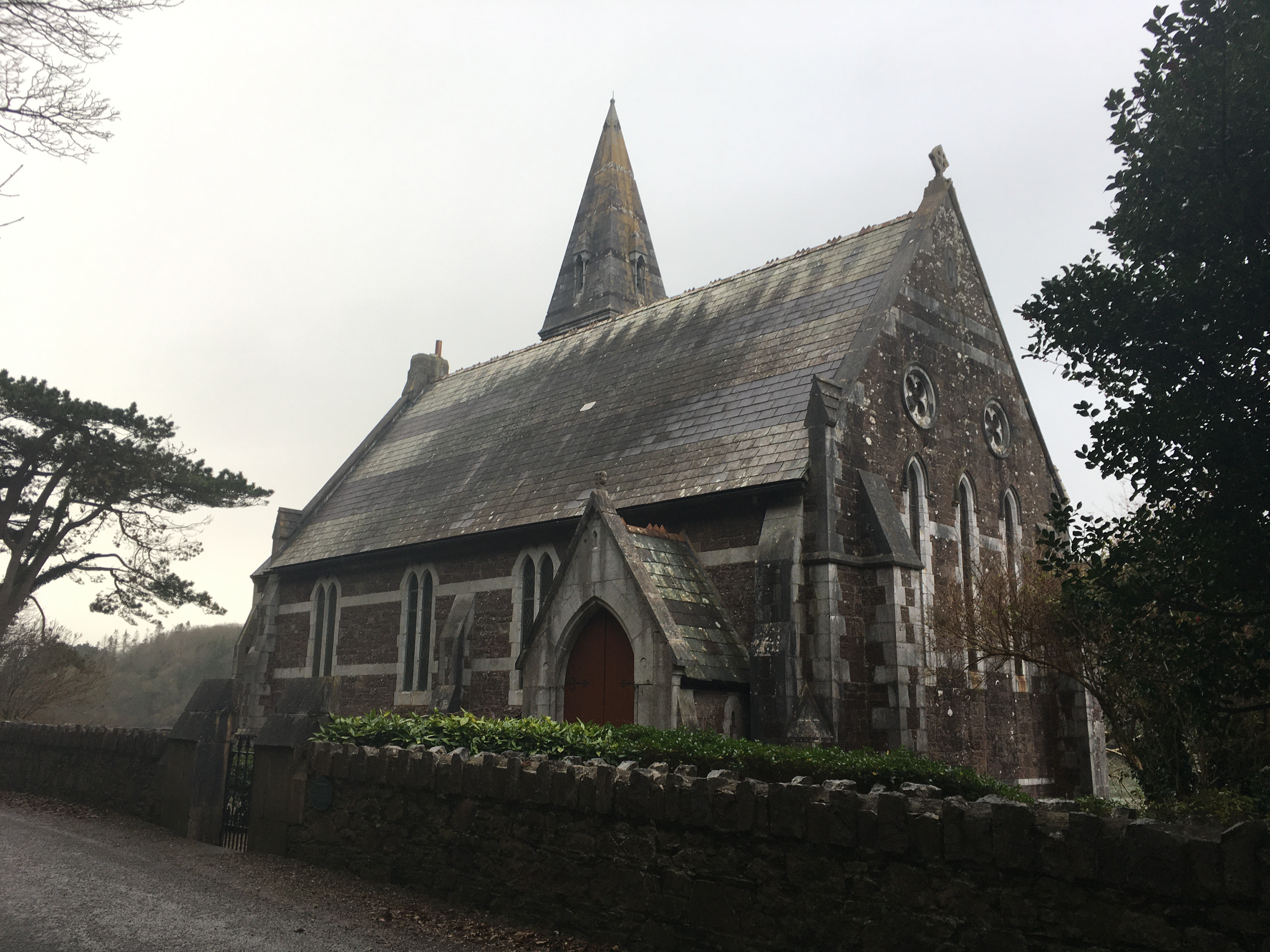
- Holy Trinity
- 51.8653°N 8.2093°W
- Location: East Ferry, County Cork
- Country: Ireland
- Denomination: Church of Ireland

History
- Status: In use
- Dedication: Holy Trinity
- Consecrated: 1867

Architecture
- Heritage designation: Protected structure
- Architect: William Atkins
- Style: Gothic revival
- Years built: 1865–1867

Holy Trinity Church is a small Gothic Revival Anglican church located in East Ferry, County Cork, Ireland. It was completed in 1830. It is dedicated to the Trinity. It is the church for Gurranekennefeake parish, part of the Diocese of Cork, Cloyne, and Ross. It is included on Cork County Council's Record of Protected Structures.

== History ==
The site on which Holy Trinity is built has hosted a chapel since 1302. The site was donated for the construction of the current church by Richard Goold Adams. The current church was designed by William Atkins, and built between 1865 and 1867. Holy Trinity was consecrated in 1867.

== Architecture ==
Holy Trinity is built in High Gothic style. The church is noted for its polychromatic interior and exterior, being built of limestone; red sandstone; and white, yellow, and red brickwork. The design was influenced by the works of William Burges. It features a number of notable stained glass windows.

== In culture ==
Holy Trinity church is featured in the 1873 watercolour 'Knight Templar' near East Ferry Church, 4th Sept 1873, part of Richard Peterson Atkinson's 'Knight Templar' series.
