= East Ferry, County Cork =

Area/hamlet overlooking Cork Harbour, Ireland

Coordinates: 51.86°N 8.2°W

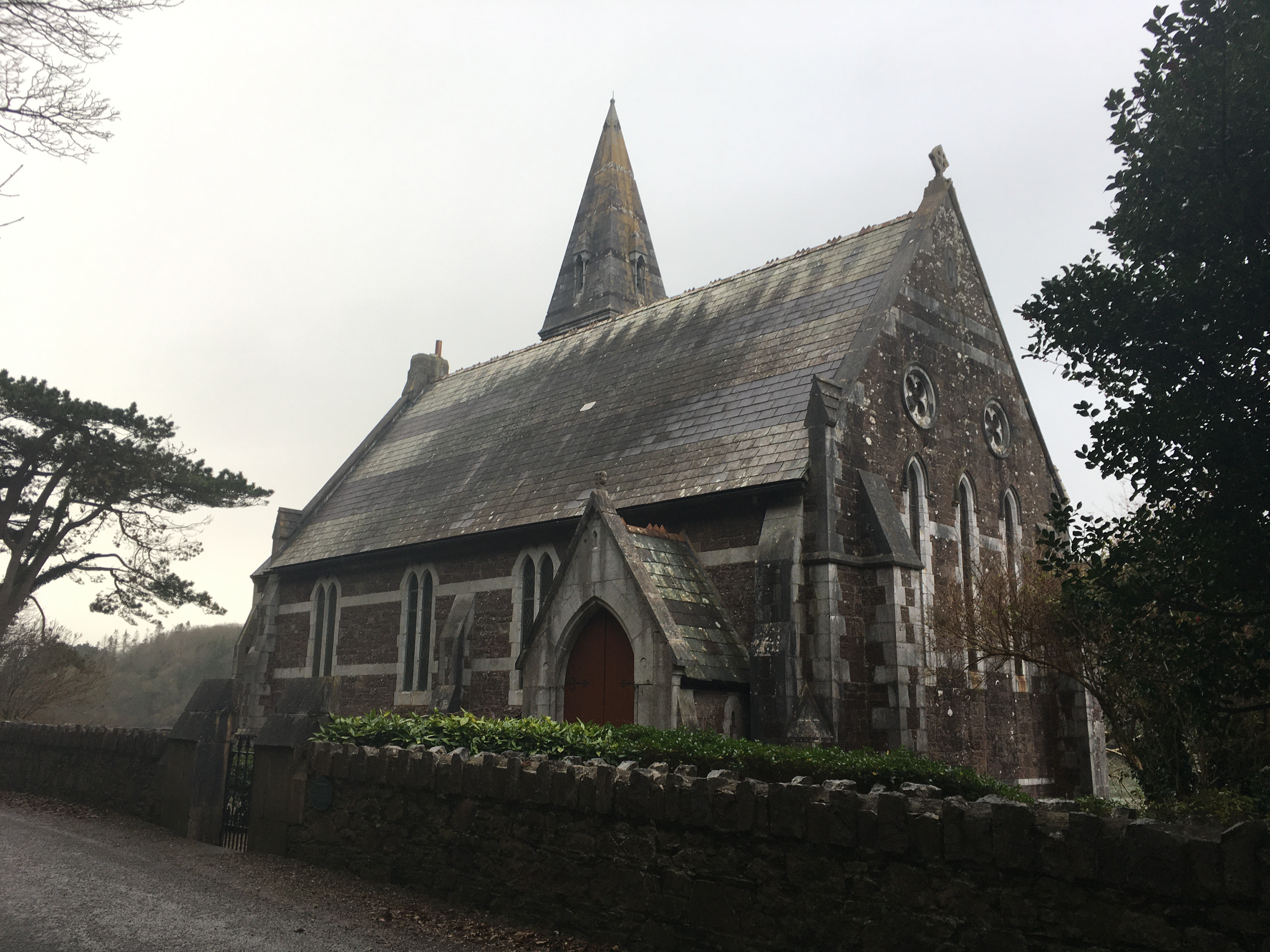
Holy Trinity Church, East Ferry

East Ferry is an area of East Cork overlooking Cork Harbour in Ireland. The area takes its name from a ferry which historically crossed the channel separating Garranekinnefeake promontory (close to Midleton) from Great Island (close to Cobh).

East Ferry, a residential area on the Eastern side of this channel, is in the civil parish of Garranekinnefeake. Notable buildings in the area include Holy Trinity church, a 19th-century church in the Church of Ireland Diocese of Cork, Cloyne and Ross, which was designed by architect William Atkins. A coastguard station was also previously located in the area.

East Ferry Marina, a commercial marina on the Western side of the channel, is in the Marlogue area of Great Island. A sailing school, 'SailCork', operates from the marina.
