= St. Kevin's Hospital =

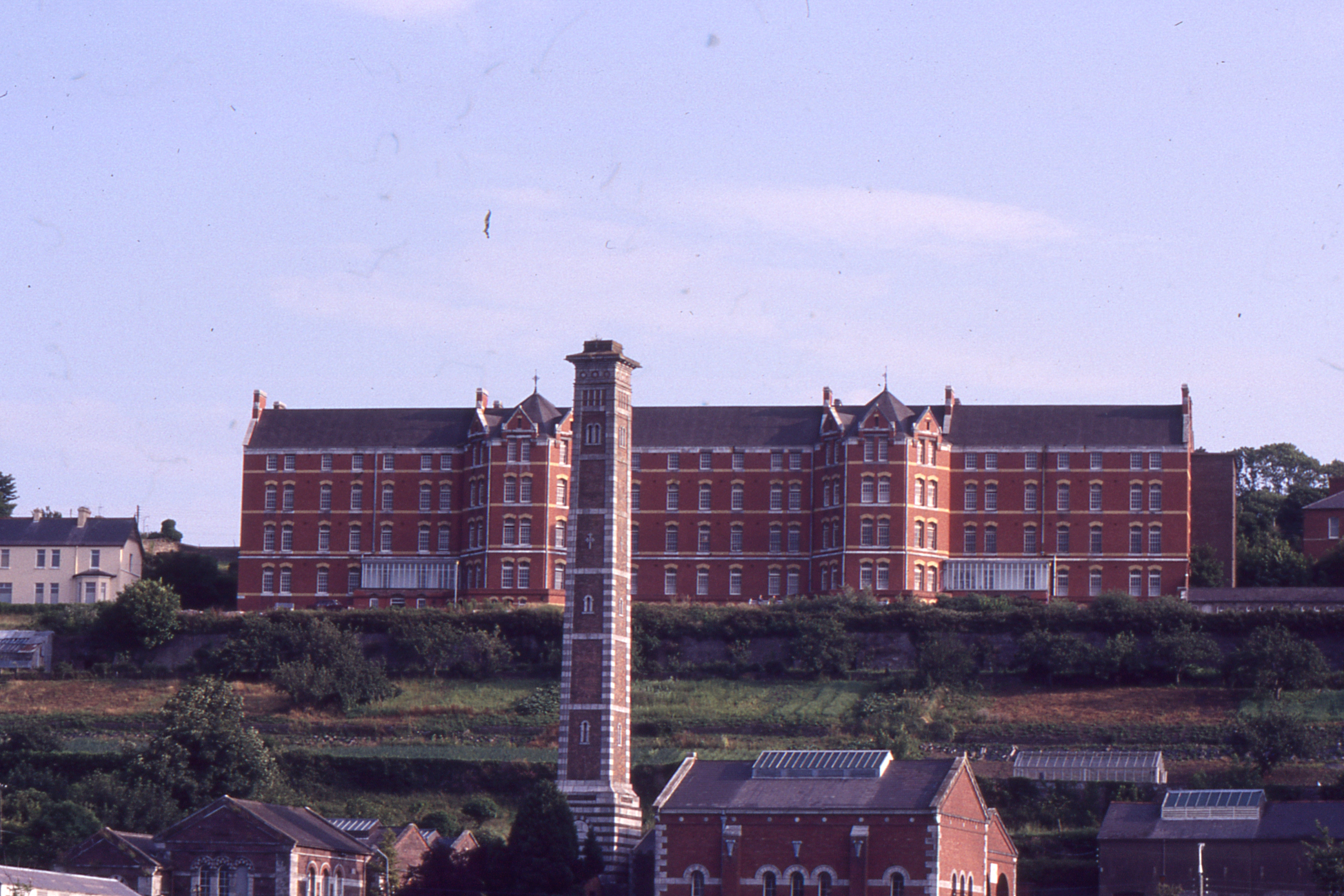
- St. Kevin's Hospital

- Shown in Ireland

Geography
- Location: Cork, County Cork, Ireland
- Coordinates: 51.89640°N 8.50875°W

Organisation
- Care system: HSE
- Type: Specialist

Services
- Speciality: Psychiatric hospital

History
- Founded: 1899
- Closed: 2002

St. Kevin's Hospital (Irish: Ospidéal Naomh Caoimhín) was a psychiatric hospital in Cork, County Cork, Ireland.

== History ==
The hospital, which was originally commissioned as an annex to Our Lady's Hospital, was designed by William Henry Hill and opened in 1899. The new annex was a substantial facility in its own right and it initially accommodated 490 patients. It was renamed St. Kevin's Hospital in the mid-20th century.

After the introduction of deinstitutionalisation in the late 1980s the hospital went into a period of decline. However electroconvulsive therapy was still used on patients in the late 1990s and in 1999 the Inspector of Mental Hospitals reported that conditions in the hospital were "most unsatisfactory". After services transferred to Mercy University Hospital, St. Kevin's hospital closed in 2002. It subsequently became derelict and was badly damaged in a fire in 2017. In 2021 clearance from An Bord Pleanála allowed the Land Development Agency to move ahead with plans for residential development at the site.
