= Le Lignon =

Urban development in Vernier, Geneva, Switzerland

Coordinates: 46.2031°N 6.0978°E

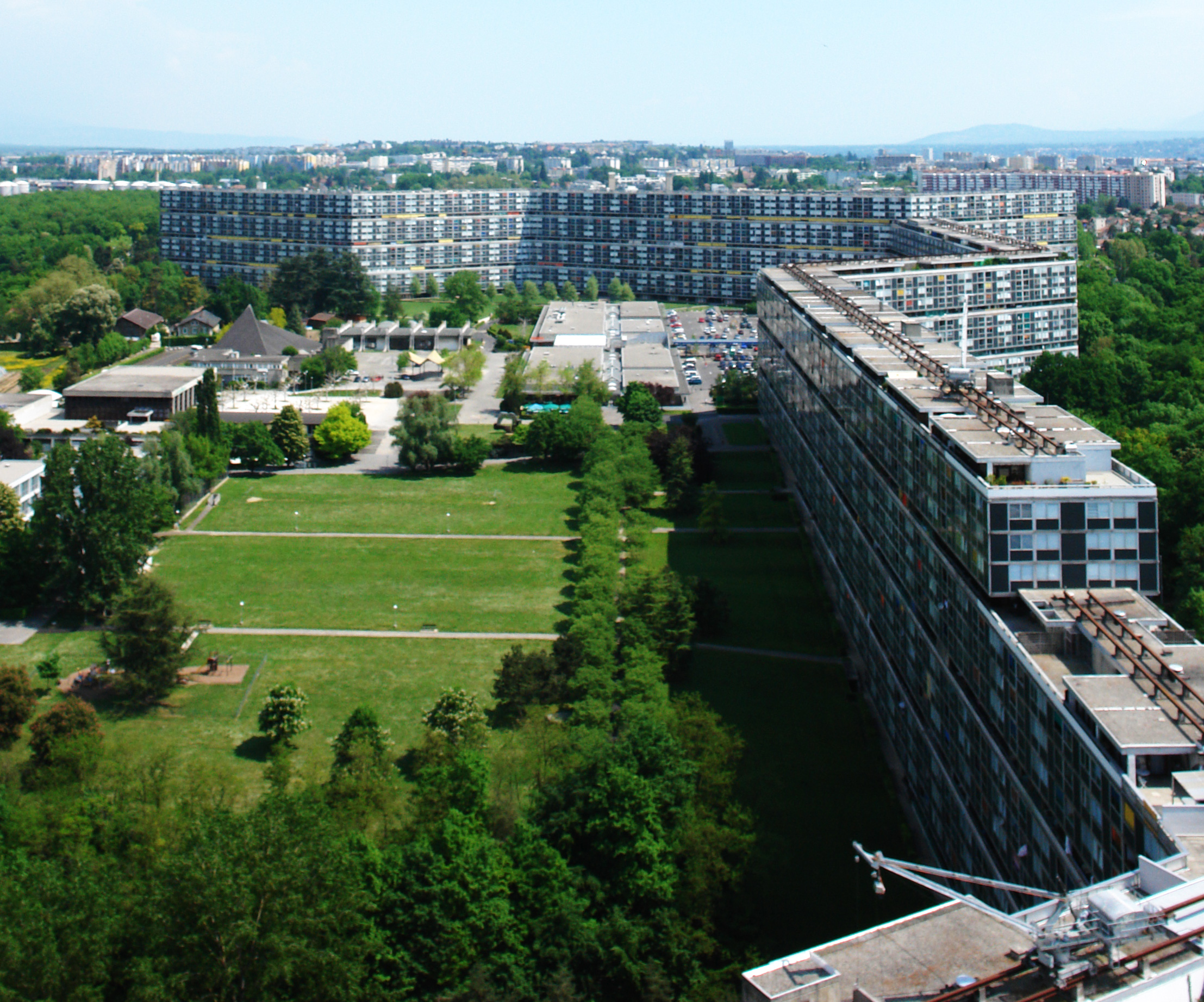
The main building extends nearly 1.1 km (0.7 mi)

Le Lignon is an urban development in the town of Vernier, canton of Geneva, Switzerland. It was designed by architect Georges Addor between 1964 and 1966 and consists of three large buildings and is one of the largest apartment complexes in the world, containing 2,780 units. It is located on former farmland and was built to address a housing shortage in the 1960s and early 1970s. It houses over 6,000 residents and 930,000 m^{2} (10,000,000 sq ft) of floor space, including a school and a medical center.

It makes up a significant portion of the population of Vernier, a town of only some 34,000 residents. With an area of 28 hectares (70 acres), the population density rivals that of the island of Manhattan. In the 2010s, the building went through a thermal insulation retrofit to improve performance. It is also one of the tallest buildings in Geneva at 90.8 metres (298 ft), surpassed by the Pictet Tower opening in 2026.

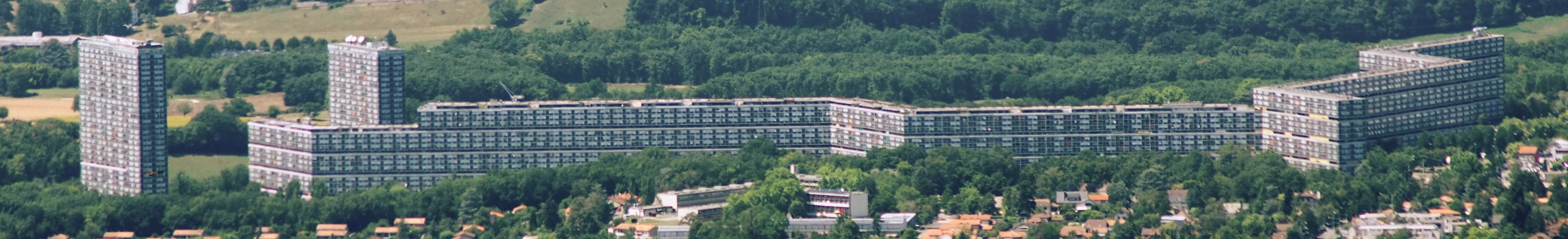

== See also ==
- Bijlmermeer
