= Vernier, Switzerland =

Vernier Vernier (Arpitan) Vernier (French)
- Municipality
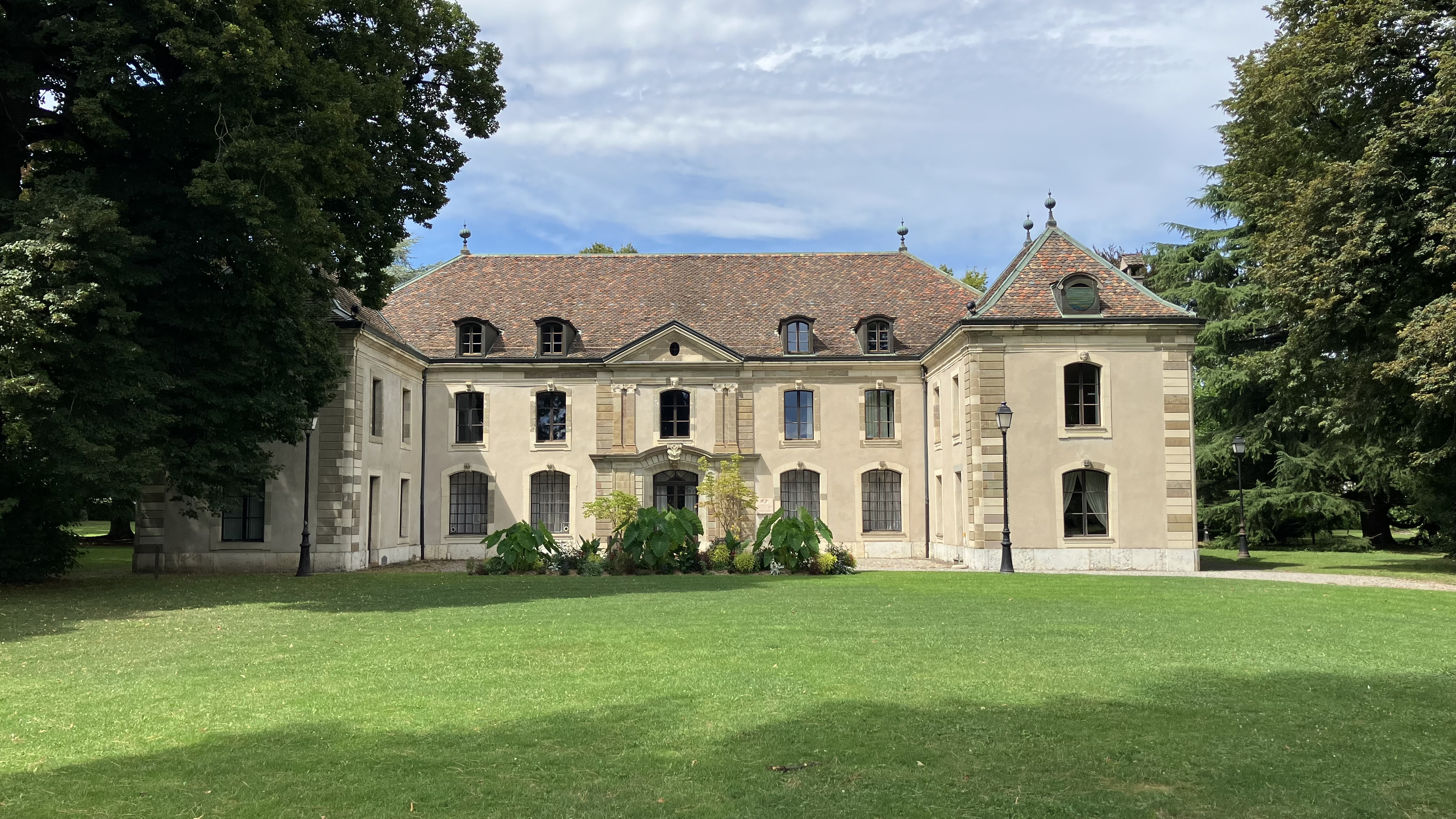
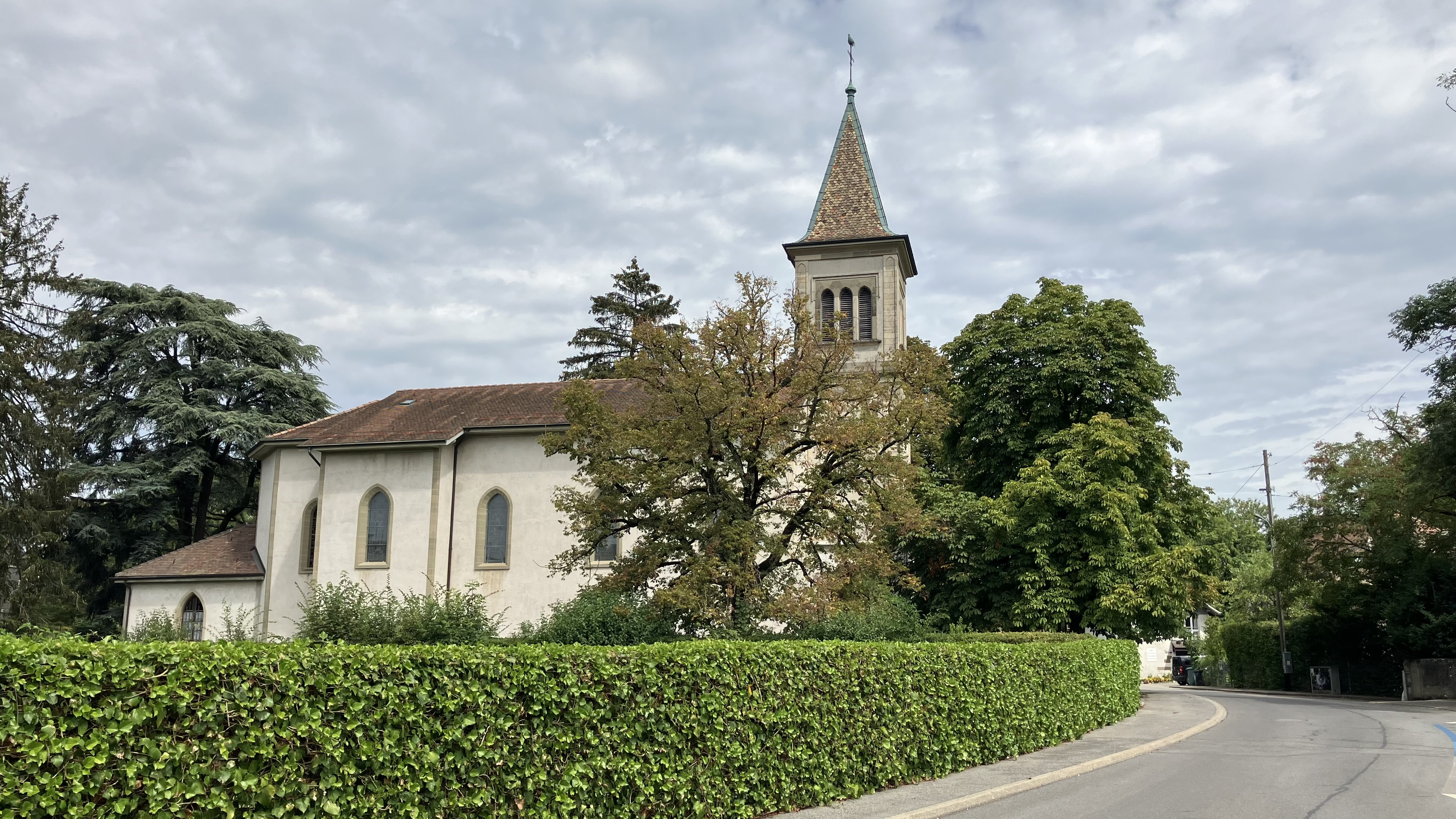
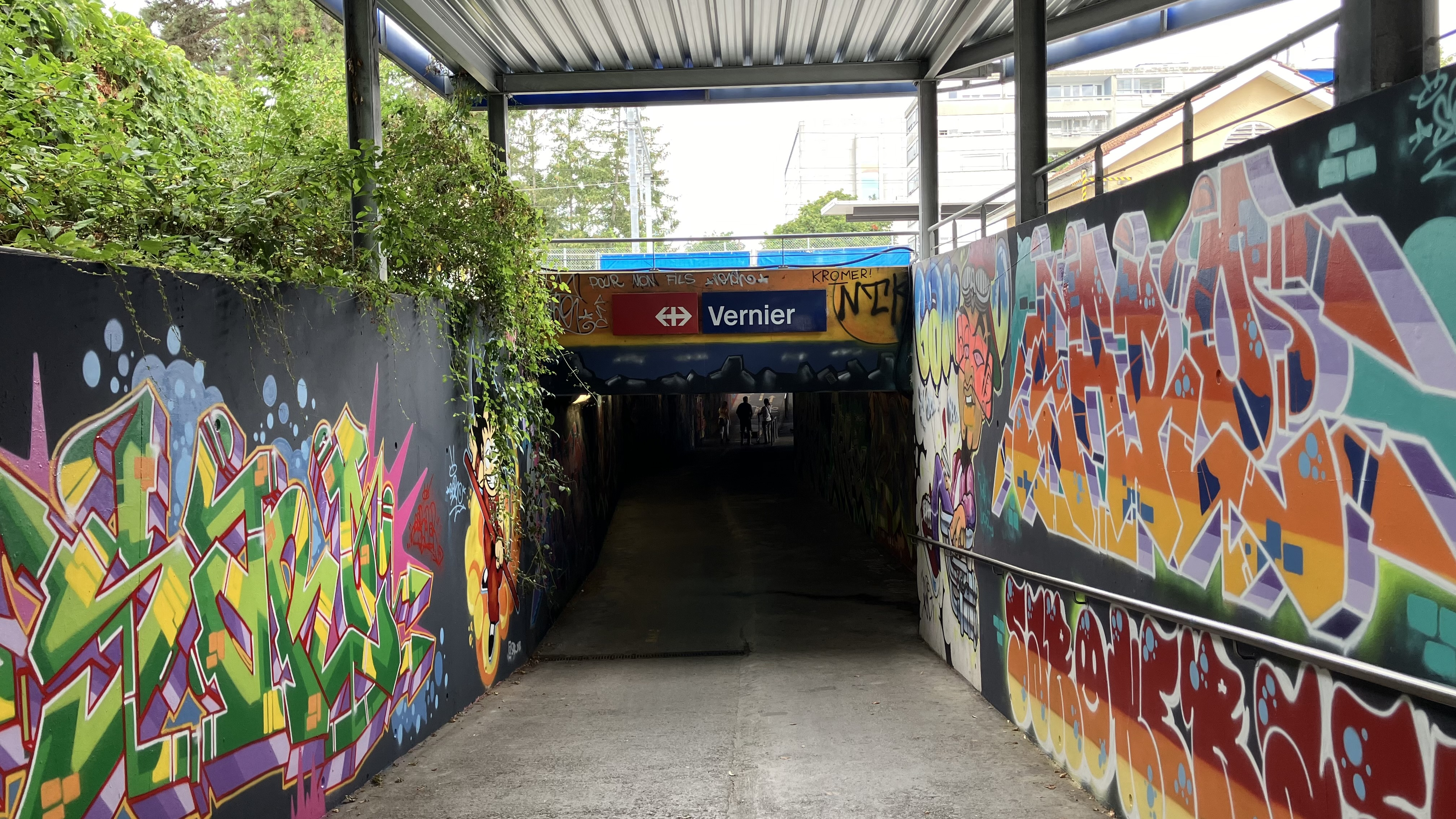
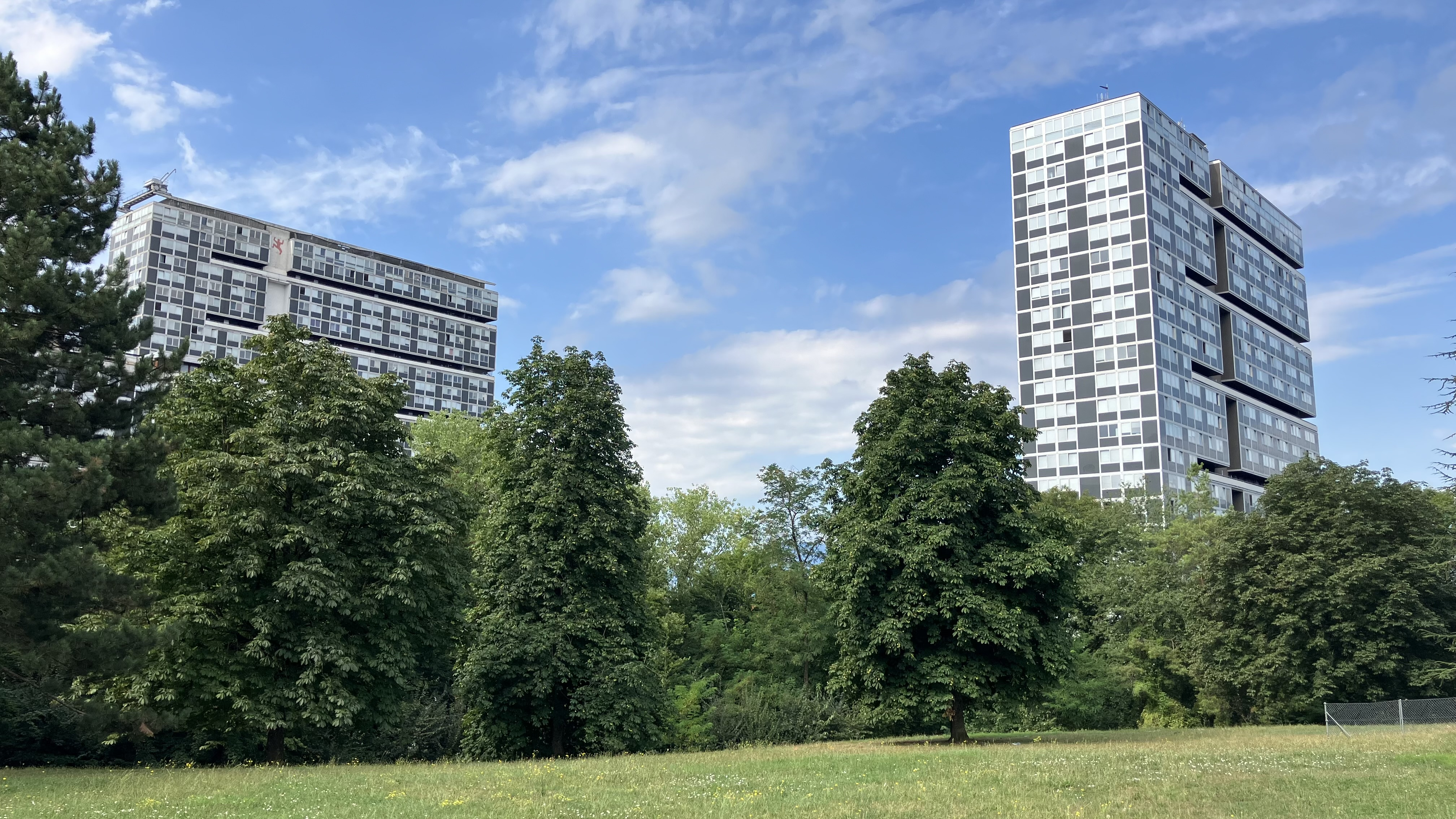
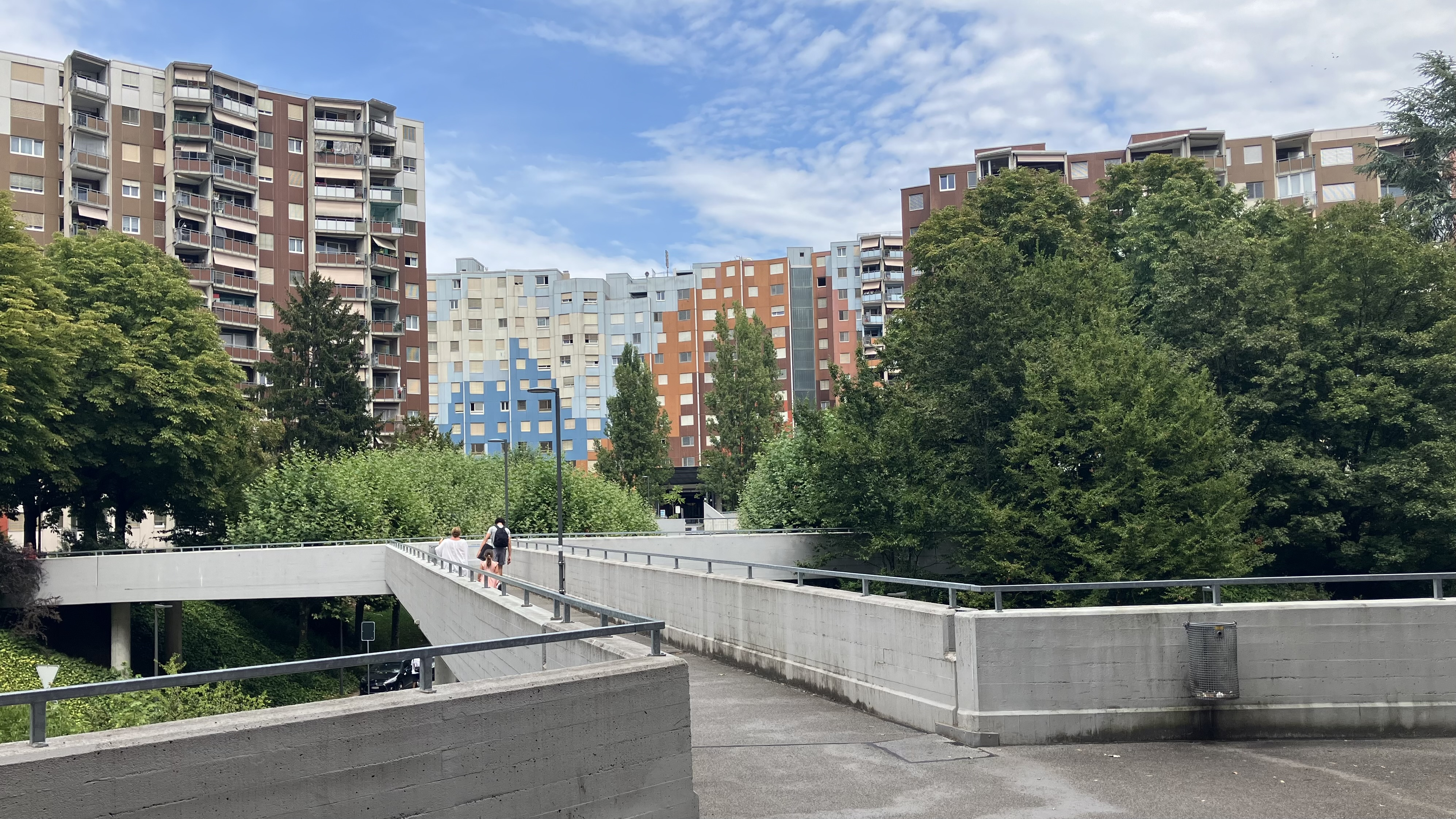
- Clockwise from top : Town Hall, Train Station, Les Avanchets, Le Lignon, Catholic Church

- Flag Coat of arms
- Location of Vernier
- Location within Switzerland Location within Canton of Geneva
- Coordinates: 46°12′N 6°6′E
- Country: Switzerland
- Canton: Geneva
- District: n.a.

Government
  - Mayor: Maire; Martin Staub SPS/PSS

Area
  - Total: 7.68 km^{2} (2.97 sq mi)
- Elevation: 440 m (1,440 ft)

Population (December 2020)
  - Total: 34,898
  - Density: 4,540/km^{2} (11,800/sq mi)
- Time zone: UTC+01:00 (CET)
  - Summer (DST): UTC+02:00 (CEST)
- Postal codes: 1214 Vernier; 1216 Cointrin; 1219 Aïre; 1219 Châtelaine; 1219 Le Lignon; 1220 Les Avanchets
- SFOS number: 6643
- ISO 3166 code: CH-GE
- Surrounded by: Geneva, Le Grand-Saconnex, Meyrin, Satigny, Lancy, Onex, Bernex
- Website: vernier.ch

Vernier (French pronunciation: [vɛʁnje]) is a municipality in the Canton of Geneva, in Switzerland. It is located in the western suburbs of Geneva.

== Toponymy ==
The name "Vernier" comes from the Celtic word "verne," which means alder.

== History ==
Le Lignon on July 28th, 1969

In 1915, excavations uncovered mule and horse shoes from the time of the Roman Empire. After the fall of Rome, Vernier was inhabited by Germanic peoples, such as the Burgundians and Franks. It later became part of the Holy Roman Empire, within the County of Savoy and the Duchy of Savoy. In 1601, it joined the Kingdom of France. The French Revolution established Vernier as a municipality. It included three settlements : the village itself, along with the hamlets of Châtelaine and Aïre. After Napoleon's fall, Vernier joined Switzerland in 1815.

At that time, Vernier, with 566 inhabitants, was rural. In 1858, the construction of the Lyon-Geneva railway spurred the first major economic boom, leading to the establishment of industries. In 1896, the Chèvres factory, Europe's first run-of-river hydroelectric complex, began operations, providing electricity. This contributed to Vernier's industrialization and attracted several companies. From 1955 onwards, Vernier experienced significant population growth, with new housing estates like Le Lignon and Les Avanchets, alongside a large influx of immigrants.

== Geography ==
In 2020, Vernier's 768 hectares comprised 77.2% for habitats and infrastructure, 8.5% for agriculture, 9.5% for wooded areas, and 4.8% for unproductive land.

Vernier is divided into 6 neighborhoods :

- Vernier-Village
- Châtelaine
- Aïre
- Le Lignon
- Les Avanchets
- Cointrin

It borders Geneva, Le Grand-Saconnex, Meyrin, Satigny, Lancy, Onex, and Bernex.

== Demographics ==
As of 2023, Vernier has a population of 37,536, with a density of 4,883 inhabitants per km². The age distribution is as follows : 22.7% are under 20 years old, 61.9% are aged 20 to 64, and 15.4% are 65 or older.

In 2018, 32.5% of taxpayers had low income. By 2024, 3.7% of the population aged 15-64 were unemployed, with 0.6% being long-term unemployed. In 2022, the social assistance rate was 25.0%, and in 2023, 54.1% of the population received health insurance subsidies.

In terms of residency, 54.6% of Vernier's population are Swiss people, while 45.4% are foreign residents. Among the foreign population, 12.9% hold B permits, 27.0% hold C permits, and 2.9% are international civil servants.

In 2000, 3.1% of the population spoke German as their main language, 73.6% spoke French, 4.9% spoke Italian, and 0.1% spoke Romansh. Additionally, 18.3% spoke a non-national language as their main language, including 1.3% speaking English, 5.4% speaking Portuguese, 4.2% speaking Spanish, and 1.5-2.4% speaking Albanian.

Regarding religion, 42.8% identified as Catholic, 20.3% as irreligious, 15.0% as Protestant, 8.0% as Muslim, and 0.2% as Jewish.

== Politics ==
=== Administration ===
The Administrative Council is composed of three administrative councilors, one of whom is appointed mayor for one year. The three councilors divide the departments among themselves for the five-year term. The executive of the municipality, which took office on June 1, 2020, is composed as follows :

Administrative Council Members (2020-2025 Legislature)
Identity	Political party	Function (2024-2025 Legislature)
Martin Staub	Social Democratic Party	Mayor
Gian-Reto Agramunt	The Liberals	Vice Mayor
Mathias Buschbeck	Green Party	Administrative Councilor

The Municipal Council consists of 37 members, led by a president, vice-president, and secretary. Committees, with 1 or 2 commissioners from each party based on seat proportion. Following the precedent elections, the council was represented as follows :

Municipal Council Members (2020-2025 Legislature)
Political party	Votes	Votes in %	Seats
Social Democratic Party	1,755	28,23 %	11/37
Green Party	1,090	17,34 %	7/37
Geneva Citizens' Movement	881	14,07 %	6/37
The Liberals	779	12,55 %	4/37
The Centre - Green Liberal Party	552	8,96 %	3/37
Swiss People's Party	562	8,94 %	3/37
Alternative Vernier	467	7,78 %	3/37
Swiss Party of Labour	128	2,12 %	0/37

== Economy ==
As of 2010, Vernier had an unemployment rate of 8.7%. As of 2008, there were 41 people employed in the primary economic sector and about 7 businesses involved in this sector. 5,192 people were employed in the secondary sector and there were 316 businesses in this sector. 8,295 people were employed in the tertiary sector, with 809 businesses in this sector. There were 13,822 residents of the municipality who were employed in some capacity, of which females made up 44.6% of the workforce.

In 2008 the total number of full-time equivalent jobs was 12,129. The number of jobs in the primary sector was 35, all of which were in agriculture. The number of jobs in the secondary sector was 5,011 of which 2,133 or (42.6%) were in manufacturing, 3 or (0.1%) were in mining and 1,310 (26.1%) were in construction. The number of jobs in the tertiary sector was 7,083. In the tertiary sector; 2,767 or 39.1% were in wholesale or retail sales or the repair of motor vehicles, 361 or 5.1% were in the movement and storage of goods, 405 or 5.7% were in a hotel or restaurant, 397 or 5.6% were in the information industry, 142 or 2.0% were the insurance or financial industry, 345 or 4.9% were technical professionals or scientists, 375 or 5.3% were in education and 556 or 7.8% were in health care.

In 2000, there were 10,414 workers who commuted into the municipality and 10,942 workers who commuted away. The municipality is a net exporter of workers, with about 1.1 workers leaving the municipality for every one entering. About 12.7% of the workforce coming into Vernier are coming from outside Switzerland, while 0.0% of the locals commute out of Switzerland for work. Of the working population, 34.5% used public transportation to get to work, and 48.5% used a private car.

== Transport ==
There is a train station.

== Education ==
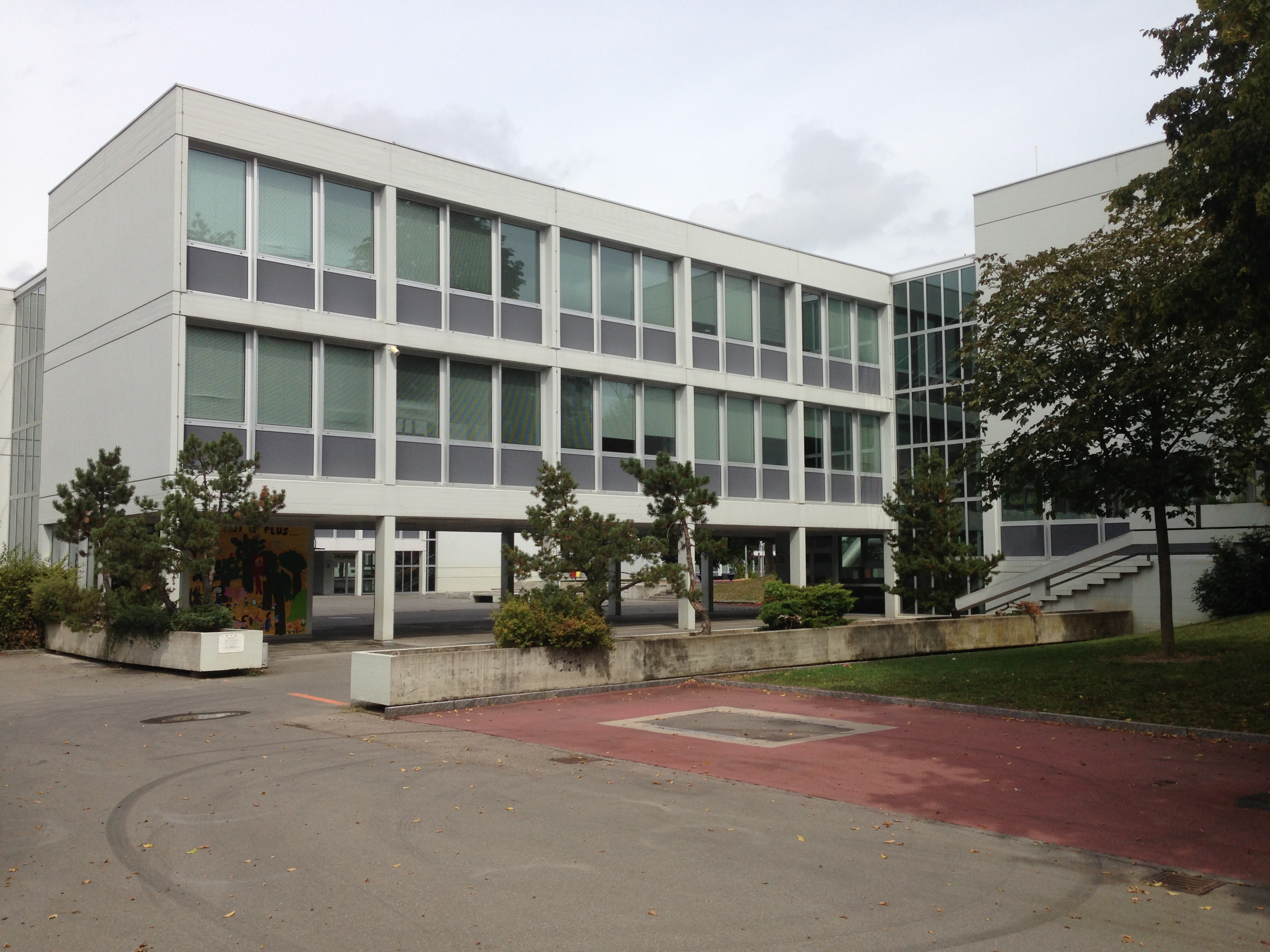
École du Lignon

In Vernier about 8,149 or (27.6%) of the population have completed non-mandatory upper secondary education, and 3,058 or (10.3%) have completed additional higher education (either university or a Fachhochschule). Of the 3,058 who completed tertiary schooling, 38.3% were Swiss men, 28.2% were Swiss women, 20.4% were non-Swiss men and 13.2% were non-Swiss women.

During the 2009–2010 school year there were a total of 6,827 students in the Vernier school system. The education system in the Canton of Geneva allows young children to attend two years of non-obligatory Kindergarten. During that school year, there were 413 children who were in a pre-kindergarten class. The canton's school system provides two years of non-mandatory kindergarten and requires students to attend six years of primary school, with some of the children attending smaller, specialized classes. In Vernier there were 1,181 students in kindergarten or primary school and 197 students were in the special, smaller classes. The secondary school program consists of three lower, obligatory years of schooling, followed by three to five years of optional, advanced schools. There were 1,181 lower secondary students who attended school in Vernier. There were 1,724 upper secondary students from the municipality along with 277 students who were in a professional, non-university track program. An additional 194 students attended a private school.

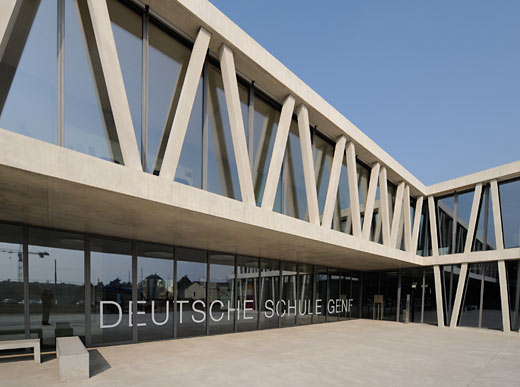
Deutsche Schule Genf, a German international school

As of 2000, there were 449 students in Vernier who came from another municipality, while 2,114 residents attended schools outside the municipality.

=== Primary and secondary schools ===
Public schools in Vernier include the following:

- Moyenne:
  - École des Ranches II
- Elémentaire:
  - École Bourquin (Châtelaine)
  - École de Poussy
  - École des Ranches I
  - École des Ranches I Village
- Moyenne and Elémentaire:
  - École d'Aïre (Aïre)
  - École d'Avanchet-Jura (Les Avanchets)
  - École d'Avanchet-Salève (Les Avanchets)
  - École de Balexert (Châtelaine)
  - École de Châtelaine (Châtelaine)
  - École des Libellules (Aïre)
  - École du Lignon (Le Lignon)
  - École de Vernier-Place

The Deutsche Schule Genf (DSG), the Geneva area's German international school, is located in the municipality.

=== Public libraries ===
Vernier is home to the Bibliothèque Municipale de Vernier library.

== Sport ==
FC Vernier plays for Vernier.

== Non-profit organisations ==
The YMCA has its head office in Vernier. The head office moved to Vernier in 2020.

The International Standards Organization (ISO) is also in Vernier.
